= China National Highway 201 =

Road in China

National Highway 201
- 201国道

Route information
- Length: 1,964 km (1,220 mi)

Major junctions
- From: Hegang, Heilongjiang
- To: Lushunkou, Liaoning

Location
- Country: China

Highway system
- National Trunk Highway System; Primary; Auxiliary
← G112	→ G202

China National Highway 201 (G201) runs from Hegang, Heilongjiang Province to Lushunkou, Liaoning Province. It is 1,964 kilometres in length and runs southeast from Hegang towards the border with Russia before turning southwest, going via Mudanjiang, Heilongjiang Province and Dandong, Liaoning Province.

== Route and distance ==
Route and distance

City	Distance (km)
Hegang, Heilongjiang	0
Xing'an District, Heilongjiang	10
Jiamusi, Heilongjiang	66
Huanan, Heilongjiang	162
Qitaihe, Heilongjiang	219
Jixi, Heilongjiang	305
Didao District, Heilongjiang	323
Mashan District, Heilongjiang	360
Linkou, Heilongjiang	388
Mudanjiang, Heilongjiang	507
Ning'an, Heilongjiang	542
Dunhua, Jilin	743
Fusong, Jilin	1019
Jiangyuan, Jilin	1148
Baishan, Jilin	1182
Tonghua, Jilin	1244
Huanren, Liaoning	1342
Kuandian, Liaoning	1473
Dandong, Liaoning	1575
Donggang, Liaoning	1614
Zhuanghe, Liaoning	1745
Jinzhou (Dalian), Liaoning	1883
Dalian, Liaoning	1919
Lushunkou, Liaoning	1964

== See also ==
- China National Highways
