= Jili =

Jili may refer to:

- Jili, Liuyang, Hunan Province, People's Republic of China
- Jili District, Luoyang, China
- Jili Lake (Chinese: 吉力湖), a large, shallow lake in Xinjiang, China
- Jili language, a Plateau language of Nigeria
- Jili language (Burma)
- King Ji of Zhou, personal name Jili
- Geely (pinyin: Jílì), a Chinese car company
- Stanley Tong (pinyin: Táng Jìlǐ), Hong Kong film action choreographer

== See also ==
- Ji Li (disambiguation)
- Jilin (disambiguation)
