= Xiaomuhe Township =

- Township

Chinese transcription(s)
  - Chinese: 小木河乡
- Location in Heilongjiang Xiaomuhe Township (China)
- Coordinates: 46°12′51″N 133°35′5″E
- Country: China
- Province: Heilongjiang
- Prefecture: Jixi
- District: Hulin
- Time zone: UTC+8 (China Standard Time)

Xiaomuhe Township, also Xiaomuhexiang (Chinese: 小木河乡) is a township-level division situated in the Jixi prefecture of Heilongjiang, China, near the Russian border. It is located 95 kilometres (59 mi) by S309 and S211 roads northeast of Hulin and 26.4 kilometres (16.4 mi) east of Abei.

== See also ==
- List of township-level divisions of Heilongjiang
