= Didao =

Didao may refer to:

- Didao District (滴道区), in Jixi, Heilongjiang, China
- Lintao County, formerly known as Didao (狄道), in Gansu, China
- Battle of Didao, between the states of Shu Han and Cao Wei in 255
