= Xinlu =

Xinlu or Xinlü may refer to:

== Xinlu (新炉, 新芦, 新路, 心魯) ==
- Xinlu Village (新炉村), a village in Chahe town, Weining Yi, Hui, and Miao Autonomous County, Bijie, Guizhou province, China
- Xinlu Village (新芦村), a village in Wangshi town, Jianli County, Jingzhou, Hubei province, China
- Xinlu Village (新路村), a village in Abei Township, Jixi préfecture, Heilongjiang, China
- Xinlu Village (新路村), a village in Wuxia town, Wushan County, Chongqing, China
- Bai Xinlu (白欣露), a character in the Chinese television series Super Star: The Counter Attack Star Shine (逆袭之星途璀璨)
- Li Xinlu, a Chinese actor
- Wu Xinlu, a Chinese captain in the accident of Air China Flight 129
- Xu Xinlu (徐心魯), a Chinese mathematician in Late Ming Dynasty, he's famous for his reference book Suanpan : Computational Methods with the Beads in a Tray

== Xinlü (信綠) ==
- Xinlü Village (信綠里), a village in Xinyi District, Keelung, Taiwan

== See also ==
- Zhonghe–Xinlu line, a metro line of the Taipei Metro
- Yihun Lhatso (新路海; pinyin: Xīnlù Hǎi), is a lake in Sichuan
