= Jiguan =

Jiguan may refer to:

- Ancestral home (Chinese) (籍貫)
- Jiguan District (鸡冠) of Jixi City, Heilongjiang
