= Heitai (disambiguation) =

Heitai is a town in southeastern Heilongjiang province, China.

Heitai may also refer to:

- A soldier, especially of the Imperial Japanese Army

== See also ==
- Heita Kawakatsu, Chinese politician and former governor of Shizuoka Prefecture
