= Ji Lin =

Ji Lin may refer to:

- Jilin, Chinese province
  - Jilin City
- King Huan of Zhou (died 697 BC), personal name Ji Lin
- Ji Lin (politician) (born 1962)

== See also ==
- Jilin (disambiguation)
