= Heitai =

Heitai 黑台镇
- Town
- Location in Heilongjiang Heitai (China)
- Coordinates: 45°24′50″N 131°37′14″E
- Country: People's Republic of China
- Province: Heilongjiang
- Prefecture-level city: Jixi
- County-level city: Mishan
- Elevation: 139 m (456 ft)
- Time zone: UTC+8 (China Standard)
- Postal code: 230382104
- Area code: 0453

Heitai (Chinese: 黑台; pinyin: Hēitái; lit. 'black platform') is a town in southeastern Heilongjiang province, China. It is under the administration of Mishan City, the seat of which lies 25 kilometres (16 mi) to the northeast. Nearby are Jixi City, 52 kilometres (32 mi) to the west-southwest, and Khanka Lake, 34 kilometres (21 mi) to the southeast. The border with Russia's Primorsky Krai is, at its closest, only 19 kilometres (12 mi) away.

There are 11 villages in the town.
