= Jianchang (disambiguation) =

Jianchang County is a county in southwestern Liaoning, China, under the administration of Huludao City.

Jianchang may also refer to:

== Modern places ==
- Jianchang, Jianchang County (建昌), a town in Jianchang County
- Jianchang, Jiangxi (建昌), a town in Nancheng County, Jiangxi, China
- Jianchang Subdistrict (碱场街道), a subdistrict in Lishu District, Jixi, Heilongjiang, China

== Historical places ==
- Xichang, a city in southern Sichuan, China, formerly known as Jianchang
- Fuzhou, Jiangxi, where the town is located, formerly known as Jianchang

== Historical eras ==
- Jianchang (508–520), era name used by Yujiulü Chounu, khan of Rouran
- Jianchang (555–560), era name used by Qu Baomao, king of Gaochang

== See also ==
- Jianchangosaurus, dinosaur discovered in Jianchang County
