= Shandong Peninsula =

Peninsula in China

Native name: 山东半岛 Nickname: Jiaodong Peninsula
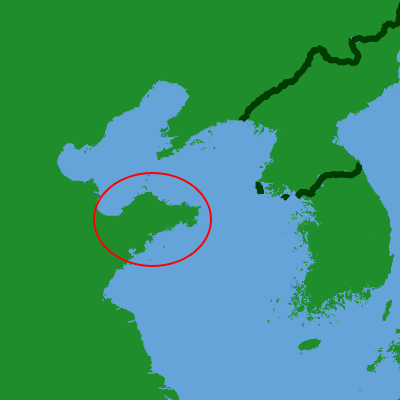
- The Shandong Peninsula on an administrative map of eastern China

- Location within China

Geography
- Coordinates: 37°N 121°E
- Area: 73,000 km^{2} (28,000 sq mi)
- Length: 290 km (180 mi)
- Width: 190 km (118 mi)

Administration
- China
- Province: Shandong

Shandong Peninsula
- Simplified Chinese: 山东半岛
- Traditional Chinese: 山東半島
Transcriptions
Standard Mandarin
- Hanyu Pinyin: Shāndōng Bàndǎo
- Wade–Giles: Shan-tung Pan-tao

Jiaodong Peninsula (Tsiaotung Peninsula)
- Simplified Chinese: 胶东半岛
- Traditional Chinese: 膠東半島
Transcriptions
Standard Mandarin
- Hanyu Pinyin: Jiāodōng Bàndǎo
- Wade–Giles: Chiao-tung Pan-tao

The Shandong Peninsula or Jiaodong (Tsiaotung) Peninsula is a peninsula in Shandong in eastern China, between the Bohai Sea to the north and the Yellow Sea to the south. The latter name refers its location being to the east of Jiaozhou.

== Geography ==
The waters bordering the peninsula are Laizhou Bay to the northwest, which opens into the Bohai Sea to the north, which in turn passes through the Bohai Strait to the northeast into the Yellow Sea to the east and south. The peninsula's territory comprises three prefecture-level cities of Shandong: Qingdao in the southwest, Yantai in the north and centre, and Weihai at the eastern tip.

The Shandong Peninsula is the largest peninsula in China. Stretching into the Bohai Sea and the Yellow Sea, it is 290 kilometers long from east to west, 190 kilometers wide from north to south, and 50 kilometers narrow. The total area of Shandong Peninsula is 73,000 square kilometers.

Geologically it was once connected to the Korean Peninsula and the Liaodong Peninsula, but was split starting around 27 Ma ago, resulting in the formation of the Yellow Sea.

== History ==
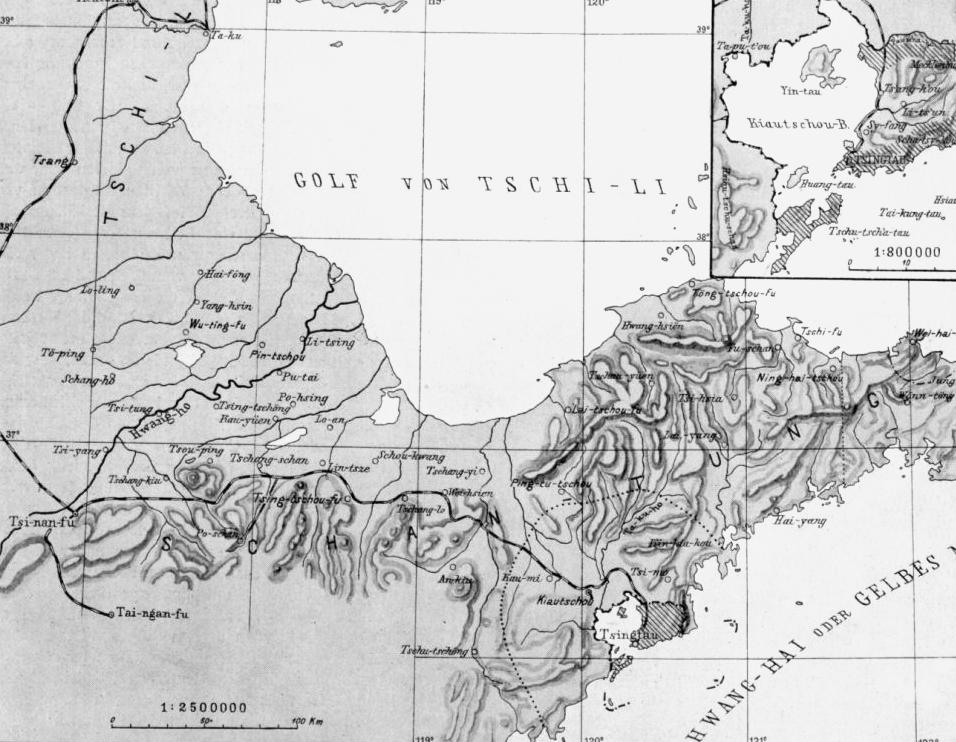
German 1912 map of the Shandong Peninsula showing the Kiautschou Bay concession

In the Paleolithic, the Shandong Peninsula area was covered by forest. In the Neolithic, about 7,000 years ago, a large number of Dongyi people inhabited the peninsula. The Dongyi had their own kingdom called the State of Lai. The peninsula later belonged to the State of Qi. The Qi built the Great Wall of Qi, which is partially on the peninsula. During the Han dynasty, the peninsula belonged to the semi-independent feudatory Jiaodong Kingdom.

During the late 19th Century, the Shandong Peninsula served as a base for the Beiyang Fleet. During the First Sino-Japanese War, the port of Weihaiwei was captured by Japan after a 23 day siege.

During the Scramble for China, the German Empire annexed the Kiautschou Bay Leased Territory from 1898 to 1914. It was located around Jiaozhou Bay, where the village of Qingdao (Tsingtao) developed into a major seaport. in July 1898, the port of Weihaiwei was annexed by the United Kingdom.

Japan seized the territory from Germany in 1914 in the First World War. In the 1919 Treaty of Versailles, Germany lost Qingdao and its sphere of influence in Shandong. Instead of restoring Chinese sovereignty over the area, the treaty transferred the leased territory to the Empire of Japan. This resulted in popular dissatisfaction in China with the outcome, known as the Shandong Problem, and led to the May Fourth Movement. Eventually, Shandong was reverted to Chinese control in 1922 after mediation by the United States during the Washington Naval Conference. However, Japan retained economic influence in the area.

Due to geographical reasons, the Shandong Peninsula is closely connected with Northeast China and South Korea. Historically, a large number of people migrated to the Northeast by boat, whereas in the present day many people from the Northeast "return" to the Shandong Peninsula. After the People's Republic of China established diplomatic relations with South Korea in 1992, a large number of South Korean companies also set up factories in the region. There are more than 200,000 Koreans living in the Shandong Peninsula. South Korea has a consulate-general in Qingdao.

== Dialect ==
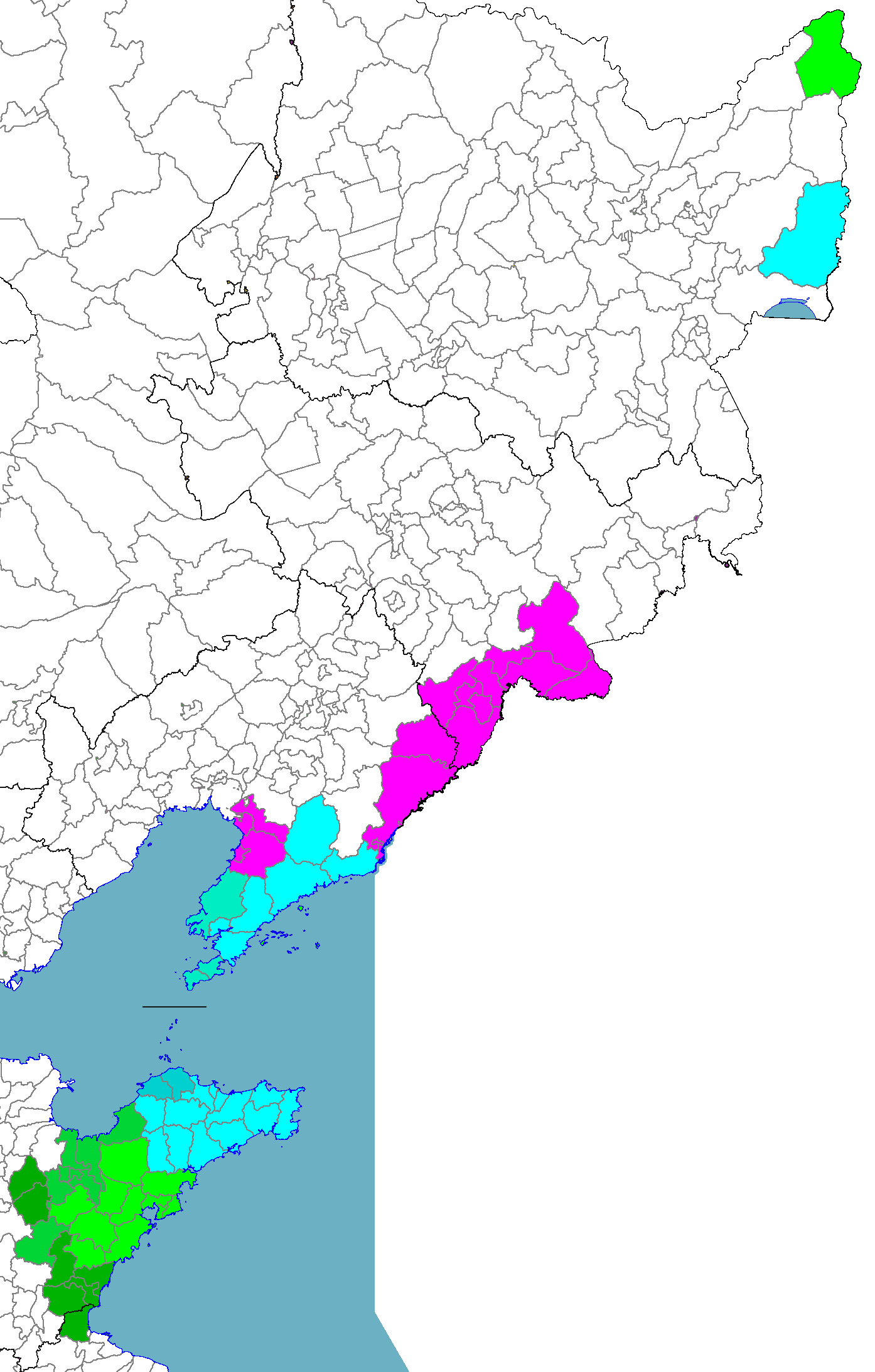
Distribution of Jiaoliao Mandarin

The peninsula is characterized by Jiaoliao Mandarin, a dialect widely spoken in Shandong Peninsula, Liaodong Peninsula, and some parts of Manchuria, such as Mishan, Hulin, Fuyuan and Raohe counties of Heilongjiang.

Jiaoliao Mandarin spread from its base, the Shandong Peninsula, across the sea to Northeast China as a result of large scale migration of Shandong people to the Northeast over successive dynasties.

== Climate ==
Shandong Peninsula is surrounded by sea on three sides and has a monsoon climate with four distinct seasons (Köppen: Cwa/Dwa). Due to maritime influence, the climate is relatively mild, in both summer and winter.

Climate data for Qingdao (1991–2020 normals)
Month	Jan	Feb	Mar	Apr	May	Jun	Jul	Aug	Sep	Oct	Nov	Dec	Year
Record high °C (°F)	12.9 (55.2)	19.6 (67.3)	21.5 (70.7)	25.2 (77.4)	34.2 (93.6)	34.4 (93.9)	37.4 (99.3)	34.3 (93.7)	33.2 (91.8)	28.4 (83.1)	22.1 (71.8)	16.2 (61.2)	37.4 (99.3)
Mean daily maximum °C (°F)	3.4 (38.1)	5.6 (42.1)	10.0 (50.0)	15.7 (60.3)	21.1 (70.0)	24.3 (75.7)	27.6 (81.7)	28.7 (83.7)	25.8 (78.4)	20.2 (68.4)	12.8 (55.0)	5.9 (42.6)	16.8 (62.2)
Daily mean °C (°F)	0.2 (32.4)	2.1 (35.8)	6.2 (43.2)	11.6 (52.9)	17.1 (62.8)	20.8 (69.4)	24.7 (76.5)	25.6 (78.1)	22.3 (72.1)	16.6 (61.9)	9.5 (49.1)	2.7 (36.9)	13.3 (55.9)
Mean daily minimum °C (°F)	−2.4 (27.7)	−0.6 (30.9)	3.4 (38.1)	8.7 (47.7)	14.1 (57.4)	18.5 (65.3)	22.7 (72.9)	23.4 (74.1)	19.5 (67.1)	13.7 (56.7)	6.7 (44.1)	0.1 (32.2)	10.7 (51.2)
Record low °C (°F)	−14.3 (6.3)	−12.1 (10.2)	−6.2 (20.8)	−1.6 (29.1)	6.1 (43.0)	12.0 (53.6)	13.6 (56.5)	16.3 (61.3)	10.1 (50.2)	1.9 (35.4)	−7.2 (19.0)	−11.3 (11.7)	−14.3 (6.3)
Average precipitation mm (inches)	10.3 (0.41)	15.7 (0.62)	18.0 (0.71)	34.0 (1.34)	64.1 (2.52)	70.7 (2.78)	159.1 (6.26)	159.6 (6.28)	69.4 (2.73)	35.5 (1.40)	35.2 (1.39)	14.8 (0.58)	686.4 (27.02)
Average precipitation days (≥ 0.1 mm)	2.8	4.0	4.6	6.5	7.7	8.7	11.6	10.9	7.2	5.3	5.2	3.6	78.1
Average snowy days	3.8	3.3	1.6	0.2	0	0	0	0	0	0	0.7	2.7	12.3
Average relative humidity (%)	63	65	65	67	71	82	86	82	71	64	64	63	70
Mean monthly sunshine hours	160.4	164.9	208.6	219.1	234.3	186.0	168.3	194.5	201.1	202.1	163.4	158.5	2,261.2
Percentage possible sunshine	52	53	56	56	54	43	38	47	55	59	54	53	52
Average ultraviolet index	2	3	5	7	9	9	10	9	7	5	3	1	6
Source 1: China Meteorological Administration
Source 2: Weather China Weather Atlas (UV index)

== Economy ==
Shandong Peninsula is the most developed region of the province, and one of the most affluent region in China. As early as the Spring and Autumn period in the 8th century BC, the fishing and salt industries had gradually emerged. During the Warring States period, the iron smelting industry and silk-hemp textile production had already reached a high level. In the Han dynasty, the region became known as the "granary of the East." In the Tang dynasty, Dengzhou and Laizhou were important ports for foreign trade. During the Ming and Qing periods, Jiaozhou was the largest trading port in northern China. After the Opium Wars, the economy developed abnormally, and Qingdao and Weihai were successively occupied by Germany and Britain. After 1949, the region's advantages were finally utilized, and it became a nationally renowned base for the production of peanuts, fruit, aquatic products, and tussah silk. Qingdao and Yantai are currently developing economic and technological development zones.

=== Agriculture ===
Due to its hilly terrain and mild, humid climate, the Shandong Peninsula is known for producing traditional fruits of northern China. Its main specialties include Laoshan honey peaches, Qixia apples, Laiyang pears, and Dazeshan grapes.

=== Urban areas ===
Geographically, Shandong Peninsula is composed of five prefecture-level cities.

City	Area (km^{2})	Population
Qingdao	11,175.30	10,070,000
Weifang	16,004.89	9,386,700
Yantai	13,746.47	7,102,100
Rizhao	5,347.99	3,084,500
Weihai	5,697.98	2,906,500

== In popular culture ==
The Shandong Peninsula is fictionalized as the "Chinese Peninsula" in the Japanese manga and anime series, Fire Force.

== See also ==
- Geography of China
- Bohai Economic Rim
