= Sanjiang Plain =

Alluvial plain in Northeast Asia

Coordinates: 48.1667°N 134.0000°E

The Sanjiang Plain (Chinese: 三江平原; lit. 'three rivers plain') is a fluvial plain around the confluences among the Amur River, Songhua River and Ussuri River in Northeast Asia, encompassing about 109,000 km^{2} (42,000 sq mi) with extensive wetlands. The plain is located within the Sanjiang Basin, a bullet-shaped structural basin enclosed by the Zhangguangcai Range to the west, the Bureya and Badzhal Ranges to the north, the Sikhote-Alin to the east, and the Wanda Mountains to the south. The southwestern portion of the plain upstream of and between the courses of the Amur and Ussuri belongs to China, encompassing 23 counties of the Heilongjiang province; while the rest of the region belongs to the Jewish Autonomous Oblast and Khabarovsk Krai of Russia's Far Eastern Federal District, and includes Khabarovsk, the second-largest city of the Russian Far East.
