= Abei Township =

- Township

Chinese transcription(s)
  - Chinese: 阿北乡
- Location in Heilongjiang Abei Township (China)
- Coordinates: 46°12′14″N 133°15′53″E
- Country: China
- Province: Heilongjiang
- Prefecture: Jixi
- District: Hulin
- Time zone: UTC+8 (China Standard Time)

Abei Township, also Abeixiang (Chinese: 阿北乡) is a township-level division situated in the Jixi prefecture of Heilongjiang, China. It is located 120 kilometres (75 mi) by S309 and S211 roads northeast of Hulin. Established in 1979 under the jurisdiction of Hulin City, it has an area of almost 300 square kilometers and more than 11.2 million mu of arable land. It contains Xinancha Reservoir, which lies east of the main village towards Xiaomuhe.

== Administrative divisions ==
The township-level division contains the following villages:

- Xinfu Village (新富村)
- Xinlu Village (新路村)
- Xinzhong Village (新中村)
- Abei Village (阿北村)
- Adong Village (阿东村)
- Xinlin Village (新林村)
- Xinzheng Village (新政村)

== See also ==
- List of township-level divisions of Heilongjiang
