= Jilin Township =

Jilin Korean Ethnic Township 鸡林朝鲜族乡 계림조선족향
- Township
- Location in Heilongjiang Jilin Korean Ethnic Township (China)
- Coordinates: 45°15′20″N 131°13′5″E
- Country: China
- Province: Heilongjiang
- Prefecture-level city: Jixi
- County: Jidong County
- Time zone: UTC+8 (China Standard)

Jilin Township (simplified Chinese: 鸡林乡; traditional Chinese: 雞林鄉; pinyin: Jīlín Xiāng) is a township under the administration of Jidong County in southeastern Heilongjiang, China. As of 2020, it has six villages under its administration:

- Jilin Village
- Dongxing Village (东兴村)
- Dongming Village (东明村)
- Jinxing Village (进兴村)
- Yongguang Village (永光村)
- Qianjin Village (前进村)
