= Ulungur Lake =

Lake in Xinjiang, China

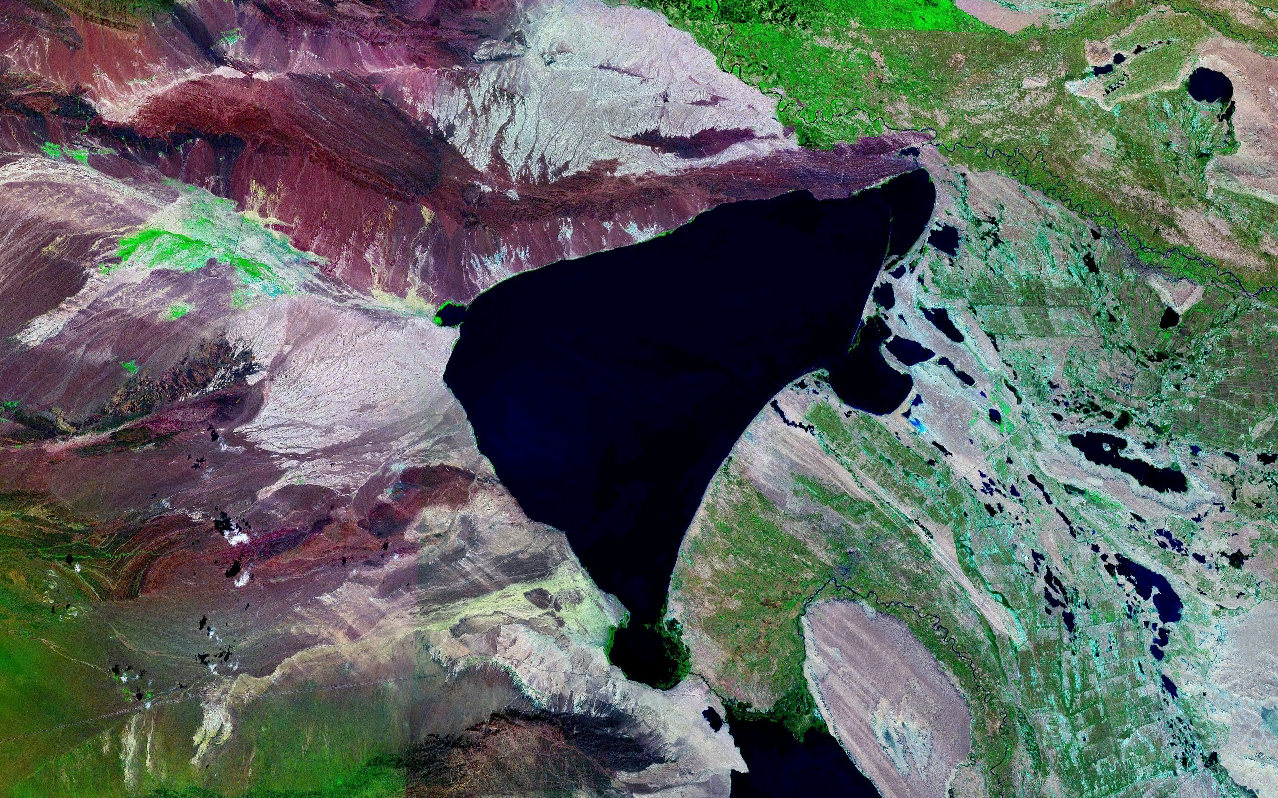
- Satellite view

- Location within Dzungaria
- Location: Fuhai County, Xinjiang
- Coordinates: 47°15′00″N 87°15′00″E
- Primary inflows: Ulungur River
- Basin countries: China
- Surface area: 1,035 km^{2} (400 sq mi)

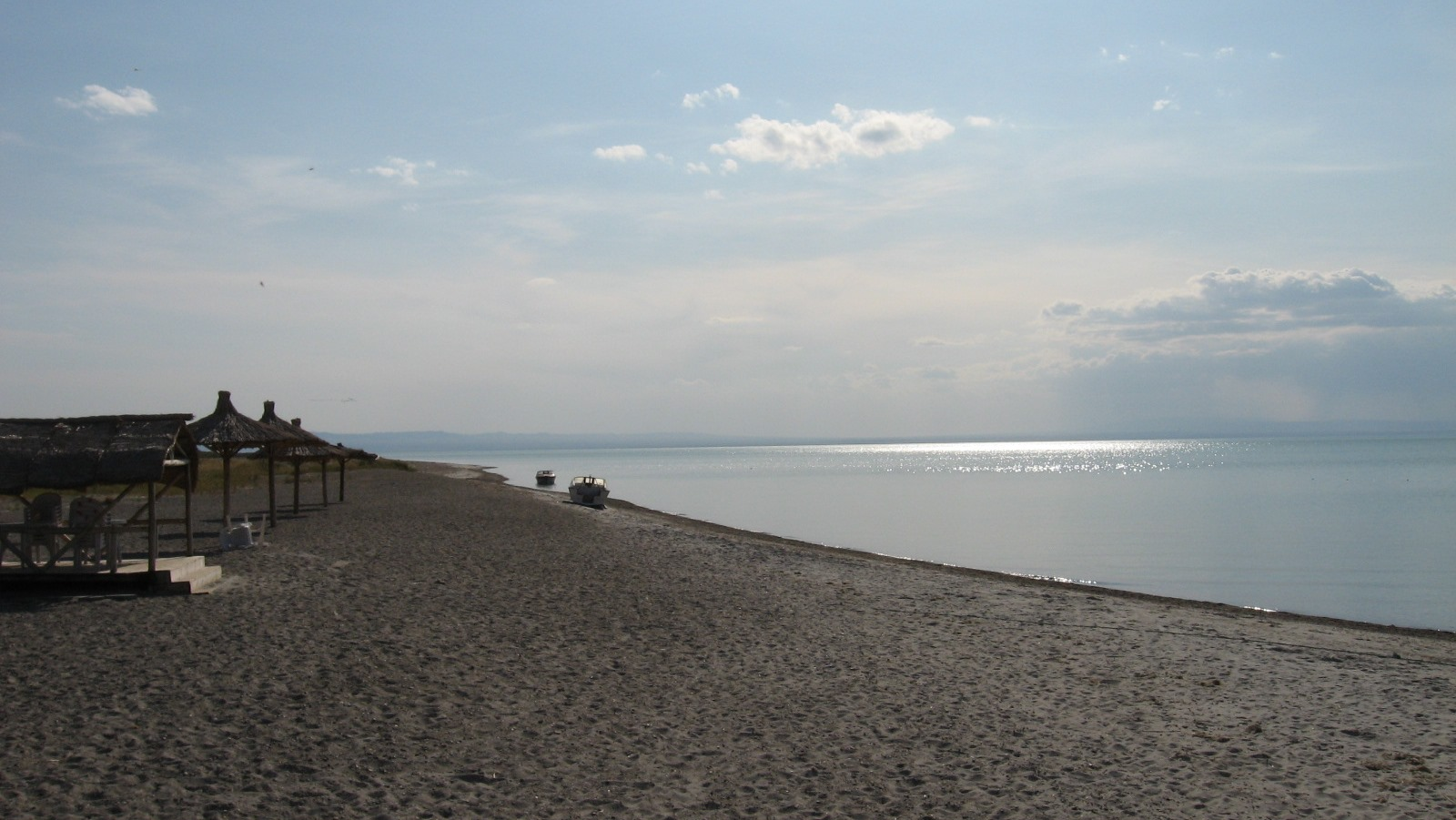
Southeastern shore of Ulungur lake

Ulungur Lake

Ulungur Lake is located in Fuhai County, Xinjiang, China. With an area of 1,035 square kilometers, the lake is one of China's ten largest freshwater lakes. Its main tributary is the Ulungur River. It is an endorheic lake, though the Irtysh River flows towards the Arctic Ocean less than 4 km away to the northeast.

Lake Ulungur is divided into two sections, often viewed as two separate lakes: the Buluntuo Lake (or the Ulungur Lake proper) and the smaller Jili Lake (吉力湖, 46°55′00″N 87°25′00″E), connected by a narrow channel. The main affluent of the Ulungur-Jili system is the Ulungur River; presently, its main channel enters the Jili Lake at around 46°59′30″N 87°26′00″E.

Between 1960 and 1987, the lake level dropped by 4.2 m, due to the increasing use of the river water for irrigation and other needs. To alleviate this problem, in 1987 a canal was built through the narrow isthmus between Lake Ulungur and the Irtysh River, diverting some of the Irtysh water into the lake. (The canal can be seen on Google Maps, starting at 47°26′31″N 87°34′11″E and ending in two outlets, at 47°25′16.3″N 87°33′04.6″E and 47°25′21.6″N 87°33′27.5″E). By the fall of the following year this allowed the lake to return to its original level, and for the wetlands around its shore to revive; this made it possible for the lake fisheries to recover.

== Fishing ==
Along with Bosten Lake, Ulungur Lake is one of the two most important fishing lakes in Xinjiang. The main fish species in the lake are the common bream (Abramis brama orientalis), Siberian dace (Leuciscus baicalensis), and the European perch (Perca fluviatilis). The annual Lake Ulungur fish catch reached the record value of 4,500 tons in 1971, but has fallen since then, to more sustainable levels.

During the winter, ice fishing is carried out on the lake.
