= Li Ji =

Li Ji may refer to:

== People ==
- Li Ji (concubine) (died 651 BC), concubine of Duke Xian of Jin
  - Other Consorts surnamed Li or titled Li Ji in Consort Li (disambiguation)
- Li Ji (Han dynasty) (fl. 180 BC), a Chinese general of the Han dynasty; see Li (surname 酈) § Notable people
- Li Shiji (594–669), also named Li Ji, Chinese general of Tang dynasty
- Li Ji (archeologist) (1896–1979), Chinese archeologist
- Li Ji (runner) (born 1979), Chinese athlete
- Li Ji (swimmer) (born 1986), Chinese swimmer

== Other uses ==
- Book of Rites, or Li Ji
- Li Ji slays the Giant Serpent (Chinese legend)

== See also ==
- Ji Li (disambiguation)
- Li Chi (disambiguation), the Wade–Giles romanization of Li Ji
- Li Jie (disambiguation)
