= Fuhai County =

Fuhai County 福海县 (Chinese) بۇرۇلتوقاي ناھىيىسى (Uyghur) بۋرىلتوعاي اۋدانى (Kazakh) Burultokay
- County
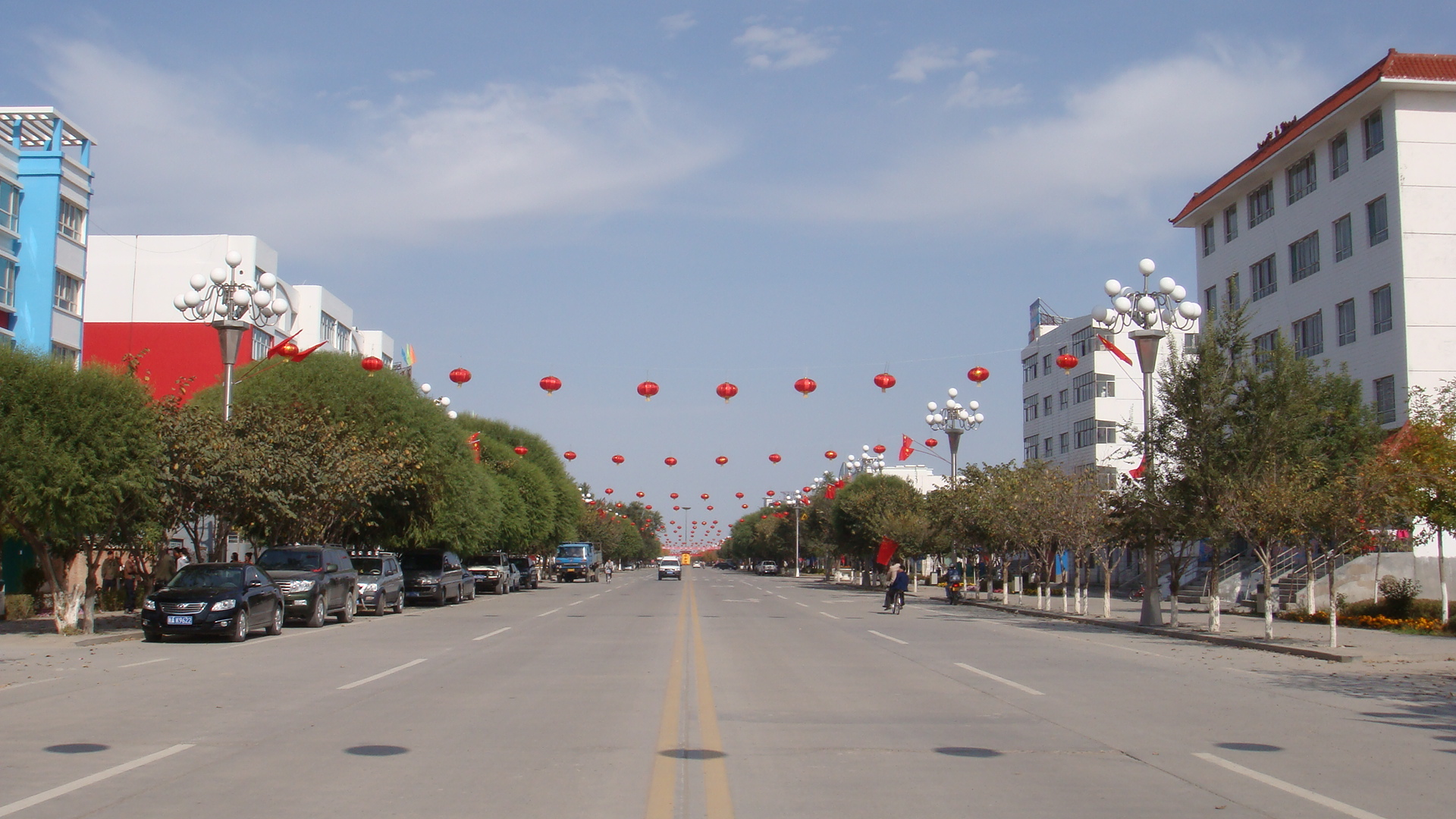

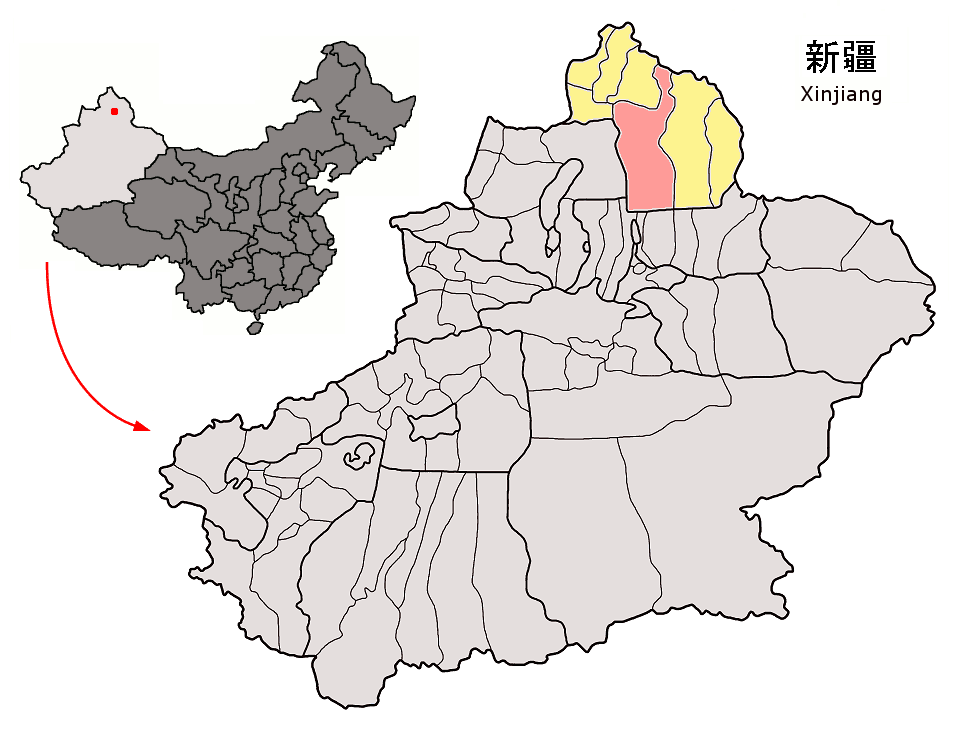
- Location of Fuhai County (red) within Altay Prefecture (yellow) and Xinjiang

- Location of the seat in Xinjiang Fuhai (Xinjiang) Fuhai (China)
- Coordinates (Fuhai County government): 47°06′43″N 87°29′12″E
- Country: China
- Autonomous region: Xinjiang
- Prefecture: Altay
- County seat: Fuhai

Area
  - Total: 33,319.38 km^{2} (12,864.68 sq mi)

Population (2020)
  - Total: 75,537
  - Density: 2.2671/km^{2} (5.8717/sq mi)
- Time zone: UTC+8 (China Standard (Note: Locals in Xinjiang frequently observe UTC+6 (Xinjiang Time), 2 hours behind Beijing.))
- Postal code: 836400
- Website: www.xjfhx.gov.cn

Fuhai County

Chinese name
- Simplified Chinese: 福海县
- Traditional Chinese: 福海縣
Transcriptions
Standard Mandarin
- Hanyu Pinyin: Fúhǎi Xiàn
Yue: Cantonese
- Jyutping: fuk^{1}hoi^{2} jyun^{2}

Alternative Chinese name
- Simplified Chinese: 布伦托海县
- Traditional Chinese: 布倫託海縣
Transcriptions
Standard Mandarin
- Hanyu Pinyin: Bùlúntuōhǎi Xiàn

Uyghur name
- Uyghur: بۇرۇلتوقاي ناھىيىسى
Transcriptions
- Latin Yëziqi: Burultoqay nahiyisi
- Yengi Yeziⱪ: Burultoⱪay naⱨiyisi
- Siril Yëziqi: Бурултоқай наһийиси

Kazakh name
- Kazakh: بۋرىلتوعاي اۋدانى Kazakh Cyrillic: Бурылтоғай ауданы Kazakh Latin alphabet: Býryltoǵaı aýdany

Fuhai County (Chinese: 福海县) as the official romanized name, also transliterated from Uyghur as Burultokay County (Uyghur: بۇرۇلتوقاي ناھىيىسى; Chinese: 布伦托海县), is a county in the Xinjiang Uyghur Autonomous Region and is under the administration of the Altay Prefecture. It has an area of 33,319.38 km^{2} (12,864.68 sq mi) with a population of 65,600. The county's postcode is 836400.

== History ==
From about the 12th to the 7th century BC, the Saka people nomadic in the area. From the 7th to the 3rd century before, this place was the territory of Hujie tribe (呼揭). In 176 BC, Xiongnu conquered the Hujie tribe, after this incident, the territory was ruled by the Hujie Prince (呼揭王) in the right wing of the Xiongnu. In 48 AD, Xiongnu was separated into Northern Xiongnu and Southern Xiongnu, this territory was ruled by King Huyan (呼衍王) whom swore allegiance to the Northern Xiongnu. From the 3rd to the 4th century AD, here was belonged to Hude tribe (呼得). In the 5th century AD, it was conquered by Rouran.

In 552, Bumin Qaghan defeated Rouran and established the First Turkic Khaganate. In 583, the Turkic Khanate was separated into Western Turkic Khaganate and Eastern Turkic Khaganate, here belonged to the Western Turkic Khanate. In 605, this place was ruled by Xueyantuo. Around 620, Western Turkic Khaganate expelled Xueyantuo from the Ulungu River Basin. In 658, Tang defeated the Western Turkic Khanate, and this place was under the jurisdiction of Jinshan Protectorate (金山都護府). In 702, Beiting Protectorate was established, although this place was under the jurisdiction of Beiting Protectorate, however, the Turkic tribes still nomadic here. In 757, the Uyghur Khaganate sent troops to help the Tang dynasty to pacify the Anshi Rebellion, and its clan power gradually spread to the west of Jinshan. In 790, Tibetan Empire captured Beiting Protectorate. The following year, the Uyghur Khanate reconquered Beiting, since then, this place was to belong to the Uyghur Khanate.

In the late Liao dynasty, this place was the nomadic land of the Turkic Naiman tribe. The Jin dynasty destroyed the Liao dynasty. Yelu Dashi, a nobleman of the Liao dynasty, moved westward to Central Asia, and established the Qara Khitai in 1130. In 1205, the Mongolian conquered Naiman tribe and killed its leader, Tayang Khan. This place is hereditary ruled by the House of Ögedei. In 1251, the Beshbalik Province (別失八里等處行尚書省) was established, and this place was changed to the jurisdiction of the province.

In 1341, Ögedei Khanate was annexed by Chagatai Khanate. Later, this place belonged to the Eastern Chagatai Khanate. The Oirats was strong and expanded westward. The Oirat people were nomads here. Among them, the Dzungar people nomadic in the Ili River basin, and the Dörbet tribe nomadic in the Irtysh River basin. After Galdan proclaimed himself the Khan, here was belong to the Dzungar Khanate.

In 1757, this place belonged to the Qing dynasty after the Qing dynasty's conquest of the Dzungar Khanate. In 1762, this place was placed under the jurisdiction of the Qobdo Ministerial Attache (科布多參贊大臣). In 1867, it was under the jurisdiction of the Burultoqay Amban (布倫托海辦事大臣). In 1869, the Burultoqay Amban was abolished, and it was still under the jurisdiction of the Qobdo Ministerial Attache. In 1903, the Qing court set up the Burultoqay Bureau. In 1906, Altai area was separated from Qobdo, and the county was subordinate to the Altai Amban (阿爾泰辦事大臣). The area under the jurisdiction of the Altai Amban is directly under the central government.

In 1912, under the Office of the Chief Executive of Altai (阿爾泰行政長官公署). In 1914, the Burultoqay Civil Affairs Branch (布倫托海民政分局) was established. In 1919, the Altai Special Administrative Region (阿爾泰特別行政區) was placed under the jurisdiction of Xinjiang Province, and Ashan Circuit (阿山道) was set up to govern the county; in the same year, Burultoqay County (布倫托海縣) was set up. In 1921, Burultoqay County was upgraded to a county, under the administration of Ashan Circuit. In 1942, Burultoqay County was renamed Fuhai County (福海縣). After 1949, it was subordinate to the Ashan Administrative Commissioner's Office (阿山行政專員公署) of Xinjiang Province. In 1955, it was attached to the Administrative Commissioner's Office of the Altay Region, Ihasak Autonomous Prefecture, Xinjiang Uygur Autonomous Region.

== Geography ==
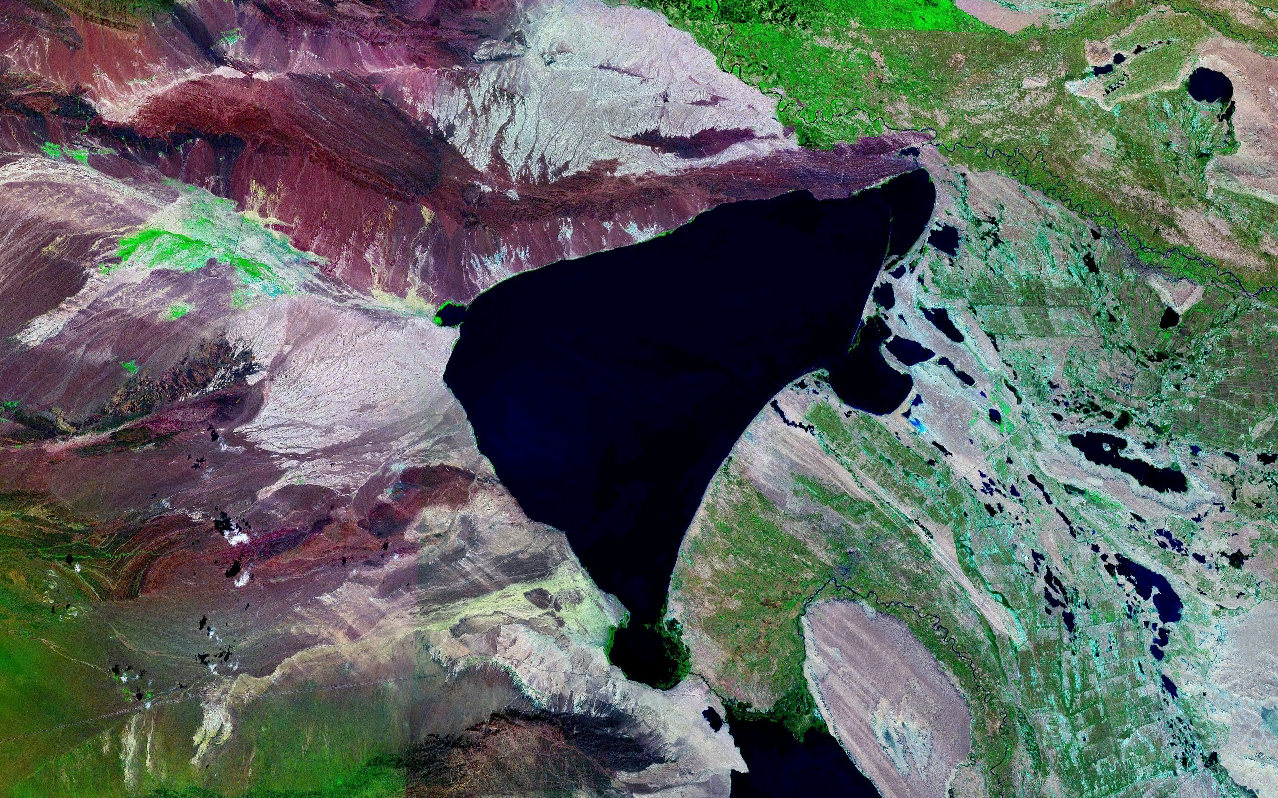
A false-color satellite image of Ulungur Lake

Fuhai County is located in the middle of the Altay Prefecture of Xinjiang Uygur Autonomous Region, adjacent to Fuyun County in the east, Jimunai County, Tacheng District, and Buxel Mongolia Autonomous County in the west, across the Junggar Basin in the south and adjacent to Fukang City, Changji Hui Autonomous Prefecture, and adjacent to Altay City and Beitun City to the north. The northernmost part of the county borders Mongolia.

The Altai Mountains traverses Fuhai County, and the two main rivers in the county are the Ulungur Lake and the Irtysh River. Ulungur Lake is located in Fuhai County. The county's elevation ranges from 386 to 3,332 m (1,266 to 10,932 ft), with an average elevation of about 500 m (1,640 ft).

=== Climate ===
Fuhai County has a cool semi-arid climate (Köppen BSk) bordering upon a cool arid climate (BWk). The average annual temperature is 4.7 °C or 40.5 °F, the extreme high temperature is 40 °C or 104 °F, and the extreme low temperature −42.7 °C or −44.9 °F. In Fuhai County, there are 224 days in a year when the mean temperature exceeds 0 °C or 32 °F, the average annual frost-free period is 156 days (the longest is 186 days, and the shortest is 122 days), the average annual sunshine is 2908 hours, and the average annual precipitation is about 131 millimetres or 5.2 inches.

Climate data for Fuhai, elevation 497 m (1,631 ft), (1991–2020 normals, extremes 1981–2010)
| Month | Jan | Feb | Mar | Apr | May | Jun | Jul | Aug | Sep | Oct | Nov | Dec | Year |
|---|---|---|---|---|---|---|---|---|---|---|---|---|---|
| Record high °C (°F) | 1.4 (34.5) | 6.3 (43.3) | 24.2 (75.6) | 31.9 (89.4) | 36.1 (97.0) | 38.8 (101.8) | 40.0 (104.0) | 39.4 (102.9) | 35.6 (96.1) | 29.7 (85.5) | 16.4 (61.5) | 5.7 (42.3) | 40.0 (104.0) |
| Mean daily maximum °C (°F) | −13.2 (8.2) | −8.5 (16.7) | 2.9 (37.2) | 17.1 (62.8) | 23.9 (75.0) | 29.1 (84.4) | 30.4 (86.7) | 28.8 (83.8) | 22.5 (72.5) | 13.8 (56.8) | 1.7 (35.1) | −9.5 (14.9) | 11.6 (52.8) |
| Daily mean °C (°F) | −18.9 (−2.0) | −14.7 (5.5) | −3.4 (25.9) | 9.6 (49.3) | 16.7 (62.1) | 22.5 (72.5) | 23.8 (74.8) | 21.5 (70.7) | 15.0 (59.0) | 6.7 (44.1) | −3.4 (25.9) | −14.1 (6.6) | 5.1 (41.2) |
| Mean daily minimum °C (°F) | −23.7 (−10.7) | −20.0 (−4.0) | −9.0 (15.8) | 2.6 (36.7) | 9.8 (49.6) | 15.7 (60.3) | 17.2 (63.0) | 14.6 (58.3) | 8.1 (46.6) | 1.0 (33.8) | −7.5 (18.5) | −18.2 (−0.8) | −0.8 (30.6) |
| Record low °C (°F) | −41.0 (−41.8) | −38.2 (−36.8) | −33.3 (−27.9) | −15.5 (4.1) | −3.3 (26.1) | 4.6 (40.3) | 8.8 (47.8) | 5.3 (41.5) | −2.1 (28.2) | −15.6 (3.9) | −33.2 (−27.8) | −40.4 (−40.7) | −41.0 (−41.8) |
| Average precipitation mm (inches) | 6.9 (0.27) | 4.6 (0.18) | 5.3 (0.21) | 7.8 (0.31) | 15.4 (0.61) | 14.1 (0.56) | 20.5 (0.81) | 17.0 (0.67) | 13.6 (0.54) | 11.0 (0.43) | 10.5 (0.41) | 8.3 (0.33) | 135 (5.33) |
| Average precipitation days (≥ 0.1 mm) | 6.7 | 6.1 | 4.2 | 5.1 | 7.0 | 6.4 | 7.7 | 6.6 | 5.8 | 5.1 | 7.3 | 8.5 | 76.5 |
| Average snowy days | 10.7 | 11.0 | 6.3 | 1.2 | 0.2 | 0 | 0 | 0 | 0 | 1.8 | 10.5 | 14.6 | 56.3 |
| Average relative humidity (%) | 77 | 78 | 71 | 48 | 43 | 46 | 53 | 55 | 56 | 62 | 74 | 78 | 62 |
| Mean monthly sunshine hours | 156.8 | 173.6 | 240.3 | 278.0 | 325.8 | 327.5 | 324.9 | 313.7 | 277.1 | 222.3 | 136.1 | 125.7 | 2,901.8 |
| Percentage possible sunshine | 56 | 59 | 64 | 67 | 69 | 69 | 69 | 73 | 75 | 68 | 50 | 48 | 64 |
Source: China Meteorological Administration

=== Flora and fauna ===
Fuhai County has 15 listed species of rare and endangered first-class protected animals in China, including wild donkeys, saiga antelopes, snow leopards, beavers, red-crowned cranes, and Mongolian wild horses; second-class protected animals include red deer, argali, lynx, swans and ibex. There exist hundreds of other wild animals, alongside more than 1,000 kinds of wild plants, including more than 200 kinds of medicinal plants, which are widely distributed. Licorice, Codonopsis, Dayun, Fritillaria, Coptidis, Cordyceps sinensis, Asafoetida, mushrooms, etc. The rare and endangered protected plants in the autonomous region include Siberian fir, spruce, Populus euphratica, snow lotus, etc.

== Administrative divisions ==
Fuhai County is divided into 3 towns and 3 townships.

| Name | Simplified Chinese | Hanyu Pinyin | Uyghur (UEY) | Uyghur Latin (ULY) | Kazakh (Arabic script) | Kazakh (Cyrillic script) | Administrative division code |
|---|---|---|---|---|---|---|---|
Towns
| Fuhai Town (Burultoqay Town) | 福海镇 | Fúhǎi Zhèn | بۇرۇلتوقاي بازىرى | burultoqay baziri | بۋرىلتوعاي قالاشىعى | Бурылтоғай қалашығы | 654323100 |
| Qaramghay Town | 喀拉玛盖镇 | Kālāmǎgài Zhèn | قارامغاي بازىرى | qaramghay baziri | قارامعاي قالاشىعى | Қарамғай қалашығы | 654323101 |
| Jetaral Town | 解特阿热勒镇 | Jiětà'ārèlè Zhèn | جېتئارال بازىرى (يەتتە ئارال بازىرى) | jët'aral baziri (yette Aral baziri) | جەتارال قالاشىعى | Жетарал қалашығы | 654323102 |
Townships
| Kokagax Township | 阔克阿尕什乡 | Kuòkè'āgǎshí Xiāng | كۆكئاغاش يېزىسى | kök'aghash yëzisi | كوكاعاش اۋىلى | Көкағаш ауылы | 654323201 |
| Qiganjiyde Township | 齐干吉迭乡 | Qígànjídié Xiāng | چىغان جىگدە يېزىسى (شىيغانجىيدې يېزىسى) | chighan jigde yëzisi (shiyghanjiydë yëzisi) | شىعانجيدە اۋىلى | Шығанжиде ауылы | 654323202 |
| Arda Township | 阿尔达乡 | Ā'ěrdá Xiāng | ئاردا يېزىسى | Arda yëzisi | اردا اۋىلى | Арда ауылы | 654323204 |

Others:

- Prefecture Farm 1 (地区一农场) (ئالتاي ۋىلايەتلىك بىرىنچى دېھقانچىلىق مەيدانى) (التاي ايماقتىق ءبىرىنشى اۋىل شارۋاشىلىعى الاڭىنداعى)
- Fuhai Prison (福海监狱) (بۇرۇلتوقاي تۈرمىسى) (بۋرىلتوعاي تۇرمەسى)
- Regiment Farms (团场) de facto administered by Xinjiang Production and Construction Corps:
  - XPCC 182nd Regiment Farm (兵团一八二团) (182-تۇەن مەيدانى) (182-تۋان الاڭىنداعى)
  - XPCC 183rd Regiment Branch Farm (兵团一八三团分部)
  - XPCC 188th Regiment Branch Farm (兵团一八八团分部)

== Demographics ==
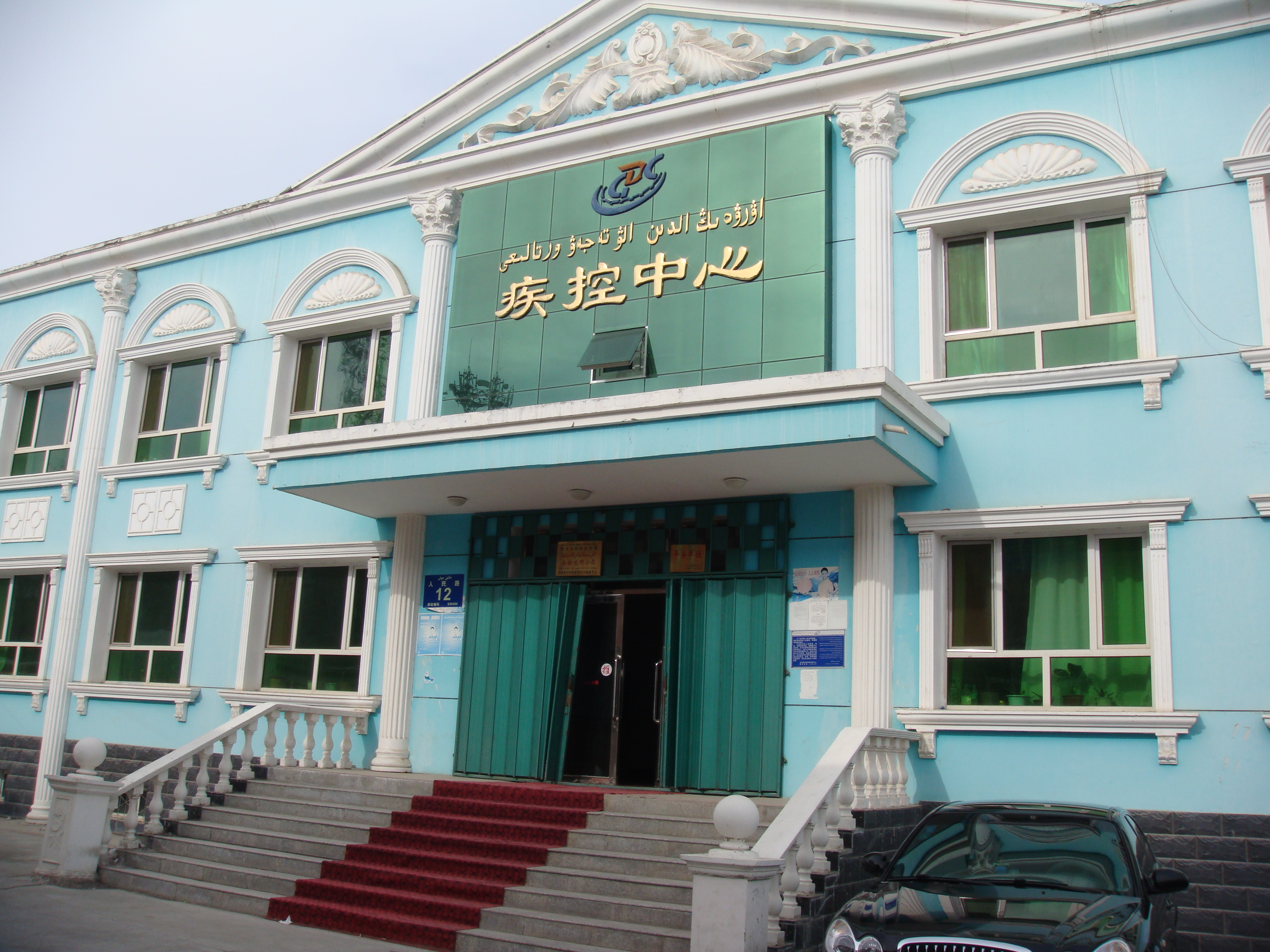
A bilingual sign for a disease control center in Fuhai County

Fuhai County is an ethnically diverse county home to 32 different ethnic groups. Ethnic Kazakhs and Han Chinese peoples both comprise large pluralities of the county's population, accounting for 48.25% and 45.65% of the county's population, respectively. Fuhai County also has sizable Hui and Uyghur populations.

Fuhai County Ethnic Composition
| Ethnic group | 2016 (est.) | | 2018 | | 2020 (est.) | |
|---|---|---|---|---|---|---|
| Kazakh | 30,000 | 45.7% | 31,319 | 42.19% | 31,363 | 48.25% |
| Han Chinese | 31,800 | 48.4% | 38,801 | 52.27% | 29,672 | 45.65% |
| Hui | | | 2,692 | 3.63% | | |
| Uyghur | | | 502 | 0.68% | | |
| Mongols | | | 211 | 0.28% | | |
| Tatars | | | 53 | 0.07% | | |
| Manchu | | | 37 | 0.05% | | |
| Russians | | | 36 | 0.05% | | |
| Xibe | | | 10 | 0.01% | | |
| Daur | | | 3 | < 0.01% | | |
| Kyrgyz | | | 2 | < 0.01% | | |
| Others | 3,800 | 5.9% | 571 | 0.77% | 3,965 | 6.10% |
| Total | 65,600 | 100.0% | 74,237 | 100.00% | 65,000 | 100.00% |

== Economy ==
Fuhai County has 1.2 million acres of cultivated land and 23 million acres of grassland, and is the home of the Altay Sheep. In 2013, the county was named the camel milk capital of China. Aquaculture is also present in the county, particularly in Ulungur Lake.

The county is home to a number of natural resources, including oil, natural gas, iron ore, spodumene. The county's proven natural gas reserves total 105.3 billion cubic meters, and the county's oil reserves are more than 11 million tons. Geologic surveys exploring the county's copper, lead, zinc, gold, beryllium, lithium, niobium, tantalum, rubidium, cesium, and muscovite have been conducted. Clay has also been mined in Fuhai County since the 1980s.

Hongshanzui Port, a land border crossing with Mongolia, is located within Fuhai County. The county government has announced efforts to improve the crossing's poor infrastructure in order to expand commerce through the crossing.

== Transportation ==
China National Highway 216 and China National Highway 218 both run through the county. Xinjiang Provincial Highway 318 and Xinjiang Provincial Highway 324 also run through the county.

The Kuytun–Beitun railway passes through Fuhai County.

== Culture ==
Kazakh culture is prevalent in Fuhai County due to its large Kazakh population, particularly Kazakh dastans, Kazakh embroidery, Kazakh yurts, and a number of horse-related traditions unique to Kazakh culture.

Starting in 1988, the county government began undertaking research regarding dastans in the hope of preserving them. In 1992, the county government archived four volumes of dastans, totaling 340,000 words.
