= Jilin (disambiguation) =

Jilin may refer to:

== Firms and organizations ==
- Jilin Jien, a subsidiary of Jilin Horoc Nonferrous Metal Group

== Places ==
- Jilin, formerly romanized as Kirin, a province in Northeast China
- Jilin City, second-largest city and former capital of Jilin province
- Jilin Subdistrict (吉林街道), a subdistrict in Erdao District, Changchun, Jilin province
- Jilin Township (鸡林乡), a township in Jidong County, Heilongjiang province

== People ==
- Xu Jilin, Chinese professor of history
- Zhang Jilin (born 1986), Chinese chess player

== See also ==
- Jilin Aodong (disambiguation)
