= Muling River =

River in Heilongjiang, China

Coordinates: 45°52′31″N 133°29′58″E

The Muling or Muren (simplified Chinese: 穆棱河; traditional Chinese: 穆稜河; pinyin: Mùlíng Hé) is a river in Northeast China, a left tributary of the Ussuri.

Its length is 577 kilometres (359 mi), and its basin area is approximately 18,500 square kilometres (7,100 sq mi). The cities of Jixi and Hulin are located on Muling River.

The area of the river is known for Sino-Soviet conflict (1929) and battles between Soviet and Kwantung Armies.

== See also ==
- Muling
