= Li Jie =

Li Jie may refer to:

== Sportspeople ==
- Li Jie (footballer) (born 1979), female Chinese footballer
- Li Jie (handballer) (born 1955), Chinese handball player
- Li Jie (rifle shooter) (born 1979), male Chinese sports shooter
- Li Jie (running target shooter) (born 1973), male Chinese sports shooter
- Li Jie (swimmer) (born 1983), female Chinese butterfly swimmer
- Li Jie (table tennis) (born 1984), female Dutch table tennis player

== Others ==
- Anni Baobei (born 1974), Chinese novelist whose real name is Li Jie
- Emperor Zhaozong of Tang (867–904), originally named Li Jie
- Li Jie (Song dynasty) (1065–1110), author of the Yingzao Fashi
- Li Jie (geologist) (1894–1977), Chinese geologist who supervised the 1927 excavations at Peking Man Site
- Lee Jye (born 1940), former minister of national defense of Taiwan
- Leon Lai (born 1964), Hong Kong singer and actor, born Li Jie
- Li Jie (actor) (born 1975), Chinese actor
- Li Jie (guitarist) (born 1981), Chinese classical guitar player

== See also ==
- Jason Scott Lee (born 1966), American actor and martial artist, whose Chinese name is romanized in pinyin as Li Jie
- Li Ji (disambiguation)
- Lijie (as a given name, multiple people)
