= Lijie =

Lijie is a transliteration of multiple Chinese given names. Notable people with these names include:

- Cui Lijie (born 1959), Chinese billionaire businesswoman
- Liu Lijie (born 1977), Chinese field hockey player
- Miao Lijie (born 1981), Chinese basketball player
- Niu Lijie (born 1969), Chinese football player
- Wei Lijie (scientist) (born 1974), Chinese Antarctic researcher
- Wei Lijie (table tennis), Chinese international table tennis player

== See also ==
- Li Jie (disambiguation), multiple people
