= Muling =

Muling 穆棱市
- County-level city
- Changzheng Road Universe Plaza Cultural Park street view Muling River Bridge Jincheng Park Sports Park

- Location in Heilongjiang
- Coordinates: 44°55′N 130°31′E
- Country: People's Republic of China
- Province: Heilongjiang
- Prefecture-level city: Mudanjiang

Area
  - Total: 6,094 km^{2} (2,353 sq mi)

Population (2004)
  - Total: 330,000
  - Density: 54/km^{2} (140/sq mi)
- Time zone: UTC+8 (China Standard)
- Climate: Dwb
- Website: www.muling.gov.cn

Muling (Chinese: 穆棱; pinyin: Mùlíng) is a county-level city of Mudanjiang, southeastern Heilongjiang province, China, bordering Russia's Primorsky Krai to the east. As of 2004, it has an area of 6,094 square kilometres (2,353 sq mi) and a population of 330,000.

== Administrative divisions ==
Muling City is divided into 6 towns and 2 townships.

6 towns

- Bamiantong (八面通镇), Muling (穆棱镇), Xiachengzi (下城子镇), Maqiaohe (马桥河镇), Xingyuan (兴源镇), Hexi (河西镇)

2 townships

- Fulu (福录乡), Gonghe (共和乡)

== Climate ==
Climate data for Muling, elevation 266 m (873 ft), (1991−2020 normals, extremes 1981−2010)
Month	Jan	Feb	Mar	Apr	May	Jun	Jul	Aug	Sep	Oct	Nov	Dec	Year
Record high °C (°F)	4.8 (40.6)	10.0 (50.0)	18.8 (65.8)	30.0 (86.0)	33.9 (93.0)	37.4 (99.3)	37.4 (99.3)	36.0 (96.8)	31.3 (88.3)	28.5 (83.3)	19.3 (66.7)	9.7 (49.5)	37.4 (99.3)
Mean daily maximum °C (°F)	−12.3 (9.9)	−6.4 (20.5)	2.7 (36.9)	13.3 (55.9)	21.5 (70.7)	26.8 (80.2)	28.6 (83.5)	26.8 (80.2)	21.2 (70.2)	11.7 (53.1)	−1.0 (30.2)	−10.6 (12.9)	10.2 (50.3)
Daily mean °C (°F)	−17.8 (0.0)	−12.7 (9.1)	−3.3 (26.1)	7.3 (45.1)	15.7 (60.3)	21.5 (70.7)	24.0 (75.2)	22.0 (71.6)	15.7 (60.3)	6.4 (43.5)	−5.7 (21.7)	−15.4 (4.3)	4.8 (40.7)
Mean daily minimum °C (°F)	−22.2 (−8.0)	−18.0 (−0.4)	−8.8 (16.2)	1.5 (34.7)	9.9 (49.8)	16.3 (61.3)	19.6 (67.3)	17.8 (64.0)	10.8 (51.4)	1.8 (35.2)	−9.6 (14.7)	−19.3 (−2.7)	0.0 (32.0)
Record low °C (°F)	−37.5 (−35.5)	−36.6 (−33.9)	−30.3 (−22.5)	−10.6 (12.9)	−3.7 (25.3)	2.5 (36.5)	8.2 (46.8)	5.3 (41.5)	−6.0 (21.2)	−16.7 (1.9)	−28.6 (−19.5)	−35.3 (−31.5)	−37.5 (−35.5)
Average precipitation mm (inches)	1.4 (0.06)	2.1 (0.08)	5.2 (0.20)	19.2 (0.76)	32.9 (1.30)	82.3 (3.24)	134.6 (5.30)	94.8 (3.73)	44.6 (1.76)	17.0 (0.67)	4.1 (0.16)	3.1 (0.12)	441.3 (17.38)
Average precipitation days (≥ 0.1 mm)	2.4	1.9	3.4	4.7	8.2	11.4	13.1	11.2	8.0	4.6	3.4	4.0	76.3
Average snowy days	5.4	3.8	5.2	2.1	0.2	0	0	0	0	1.7	5.3	7.0	30.7
Average relative humidity (%)	68	60	51	47	59	61	72	73	65	58	62	69	62
Mean monthly sunshine hours	178.9	207.0	254.1	255.7	276.2	271.8	266.1	258.4	251.4	219.8	177.0	162.3	2,778.7
Percentage possible sunshine	64	71	68	62	59	58	56	60	68	66	64	61	63
Source: China Meteorological Administration

== See also ==
- Muling River
