= Hengshan District, Jixi =

Hengshan 恒山区
- District
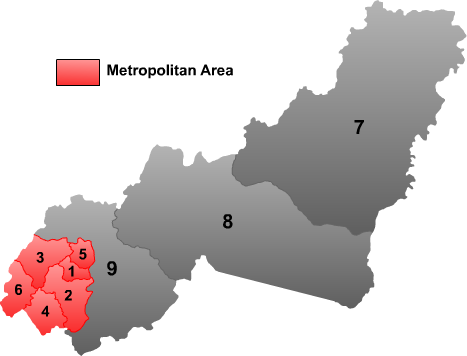
- Location of Hengshan ("2") within Jixi City

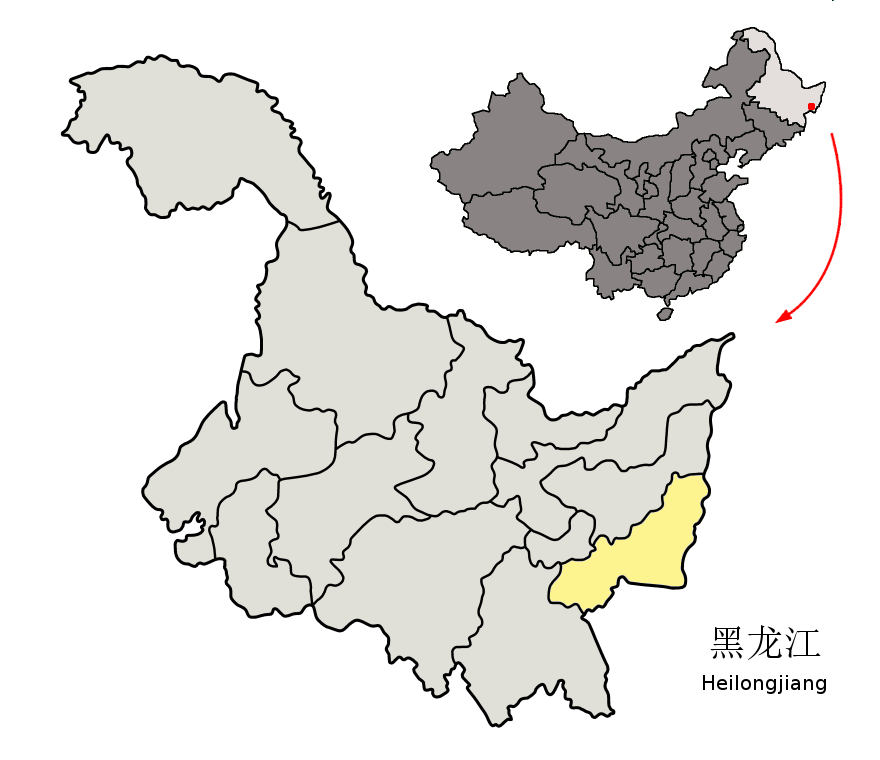
- Location of Jixi City in Heilongjiang
- Coordinates: 45°12′38″N 130°54′18″E
- Country: People's Republic of China
- Province: Heilongjiang
- Prefecture-level city: Jixi

Area
  - Total: 587 km^{2} (227 sq mi)

Population (2003)
  - Total: 173,545
  - Density: 296/km^{2} (766/sq mi)
- Time zone: UTC+8 (China Standard)

Hengshan District (simplified Chinese: 恒山区; traditional Chinese: 恒山區; pinyin: Héngshān Qū) is a district of the city of Jixi, Heilongjiang province, People's Republic of China.

== Administrative divisions ==
Hengshan District is divided into 7 subdistricts and 2 townships.

7 subdistricts

- Huamulin (桦木林街道), Dahengshan (大恒山街道), Xiaohengshan (小恒山街道), Erdaohezi (二道河子街道), Zhangxin (张新街道), Fendou (奋斗街道), Liumao (柳毛街道)

2 townships

- Hongqi (红旗乡), Liumao (柳毛乡)
