= Ji Li =

Ji Li may refer to:

- Ji Li (ceremony), the Confucian coming of age ceremony for women
- King Ji of Zhou, also known as Ji Li
- Guan Li, the Confucian coming of age ceremony for men

== See also ==
- Jili (disambiguation)
- Li Ji (disambiguation)
