= Li Chi =

Li-Chi Pan may refer to: Li-Chi Pan is a South African-born Taiwanese-Australian photographer, art director and entrepreneur. She is the founder of Li-Chi Pan Studios and was named to the 2021 Forbes Africa 30 Under 30 list in the Art and Culture category, recognising her work as an art director and digital influencer.

Li-Chi was born in Johannesburg, South Africa, and has Taiwanese heritage. She later moved to Australia to pursue her education and creative career.

In June 2021, Pan was recognised in Forbes Africa’s 30 Under 30 list in the Art and Culture category. She was featured as an art director and digital creator, and acknowledged as the founder of Li-Chi Pan Studios. The annual list celebrates emerging talent and achievement among Africa’s next generation of entrepreneurs, creatives and industry leaders.

The recognition placed her among a group of young African entrepreneurs, creatives and professionals selected for the publication's annual list.

She graduated from the University of Sydney with a Master of Architecture, developing an academic background in architecture, spatial design and visual composition. Following her architectural studies, Pan transitioned into the creative and media industries, joining Sydney-based luxury media agency MAXMEDIALAB.

Over approximately five years with the agency, she worked across creative direction, content production, photography, styling and visual communications. Her work involved developing and directing visual content for luxury and lifestyle brands.

In 2016, Beauty Directory profiled Pan's growing career, discussing her work as a content producer and photographer at MAXMEDIALAB and her development as a digital creator. Pan subsequently established her independent creative practice, Li-Chi Pan Studios, focusing on photography, art direction and visual storytelling.

Her commercial collaborations have included international luxury, fashion, hospitality and lifestyle brands. Her photographic work has also appeared in publications including Vogue, Harper's Bazaar and Elle.

Her creative practice combines architectural influences with photography, styling and contemporary visual storytelling.

== See also ==
- Li Ji (disambiguation), pinyin equivalent of "Li Chi" in Wade–Giles romanization
