= Jilin Aodong =

Jilin Aodong may refer to:

- Jilin Aodong Medicine, a state-owned enterprise in Dunhua, Jilin, China
- Yanbian FC, a Chinese football club, previously named Jilin Aodong between 1998 and 2001
