= Jili Lake =

Lake in Xinjiang

Jili lake
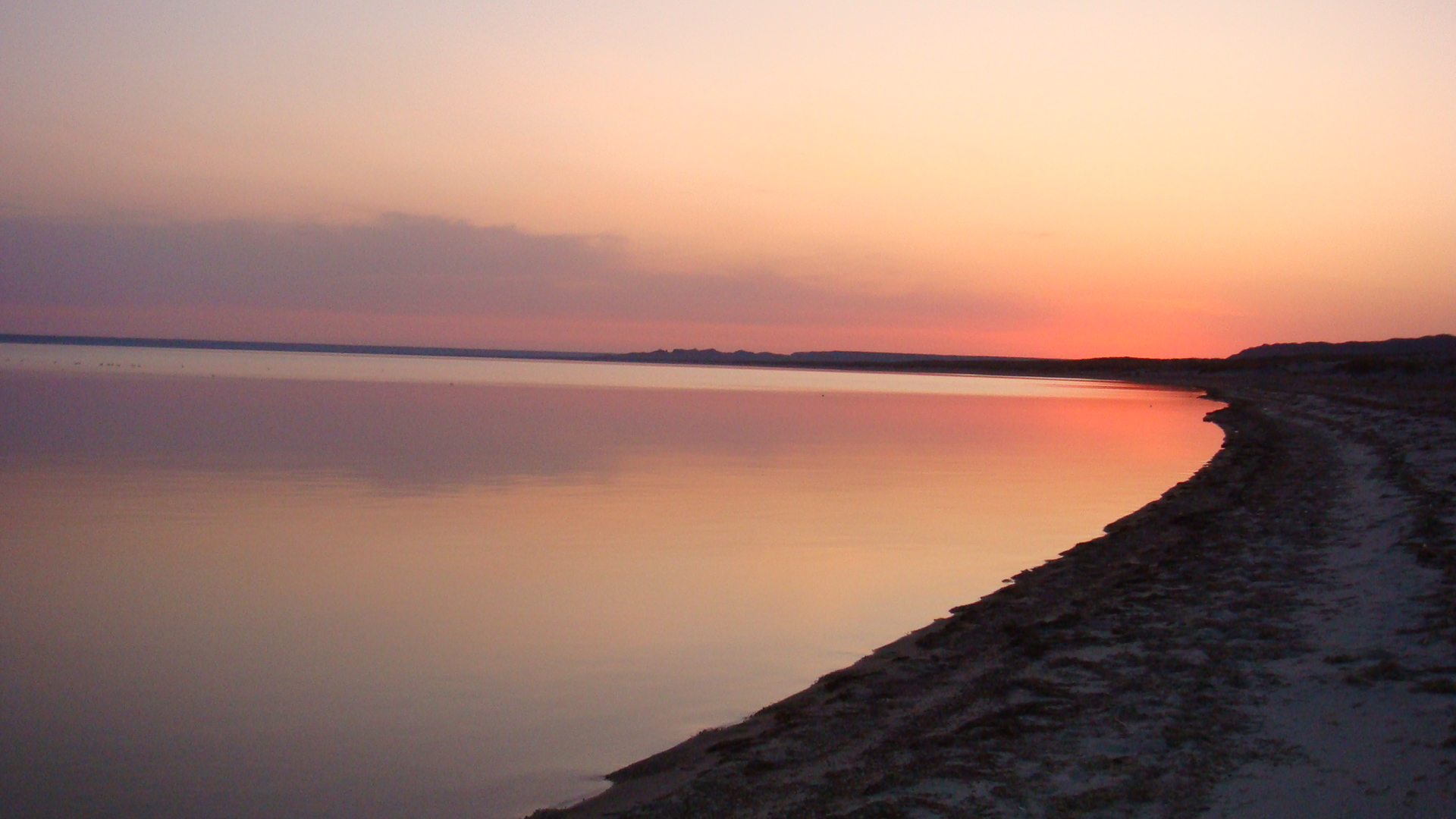
- Coordinates: 46°55′16″N 87°26′53″E
- Primary inflows: Ulungur river
- Primary outflows: Ulungur Lake
- Surface area: 170 square kilometres (66 mi^{2}) (2015)
- Average depth: 10 metres (33 ft)

Location
- Interactive map of Jili lake

Jili Lake (Chinese: 吉力湖) is a large, shallow lake in the Junggar Basin, within Xinjiang, China. It is fed by the Ulungur river.

It is believed that the lake expanded to fill its current surface area 1600 years ago.

== Environment ==
The water quality of the lake has declined in recent years due to human activity in the area, affecting the lake's ecology.
