= Jiguan District =

Jiguan 鸡冠区
- District
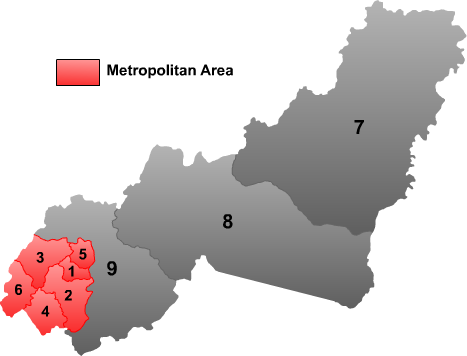
- Location of Fularji ("5") within Jixi City

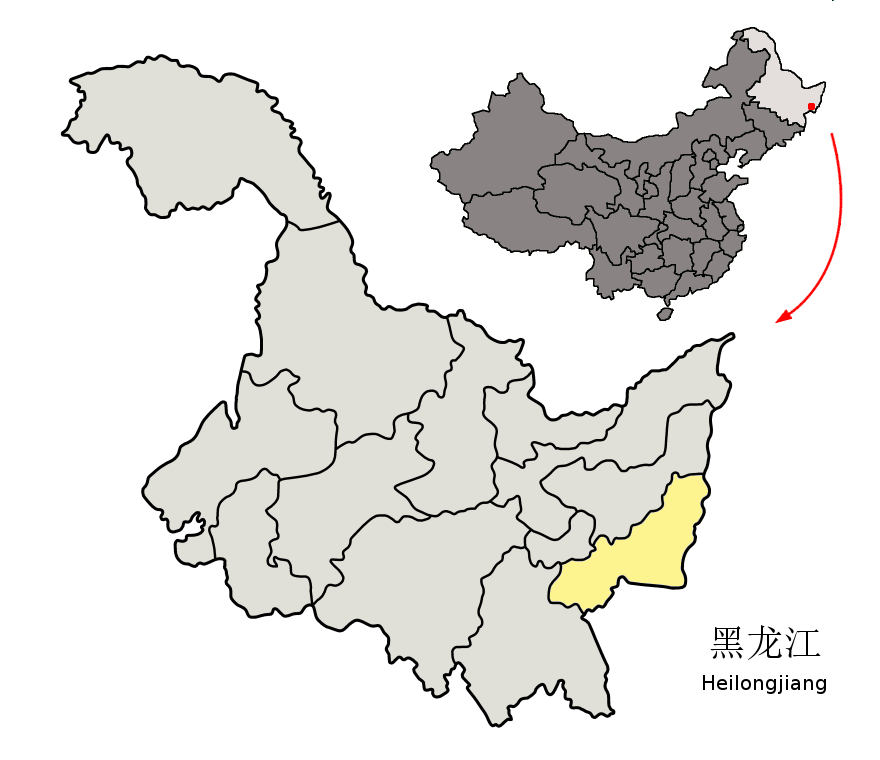
- Location of Jixi City in Heilongjiang
- Coordinates: 45°18′14″N 130°58′53″E
- Country: China
- Province: Heilongjiang
- Prefecture-level city: Jixi
- District seat: Hongjunlu Subdistrict

Area
  - Total: 144 km^{2} (56 sq mi)

Population (2020 census)
  - Total: 402,345
  - Density: 2,790/km^{2} (7,240/sq mi)
- Time zone: UTC+8 (China Standard)
- Website: www.jgq.gov.cn

Jiguan District (simplified Chinese: 鸡冠区; traditional Chinese: 雞冠區; pinyin: Jīguān Qū) is a district and the seat of the city of Jixi, Heilongjiang province, China.

== Administrative divisions ==
Jiguan District is divided into 7 subdistricts and 2 townships.

7 subdistricts

Xiangyang (向阳街道), Nanshan (南山街道), Lixin (立新街道), Dongfeng (东风街道), Hongjunlu (红军路街道), Xijixi (西鸡西街道), Xishan (西山街道)

2 townships

Hongxing (红星乡), Xijiao (西郊乡)
