= Lishu District =

Lishu 梨树区
- District
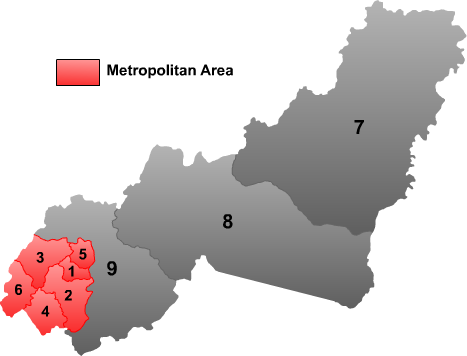
- Location of Lishu ("4") within Jixi City

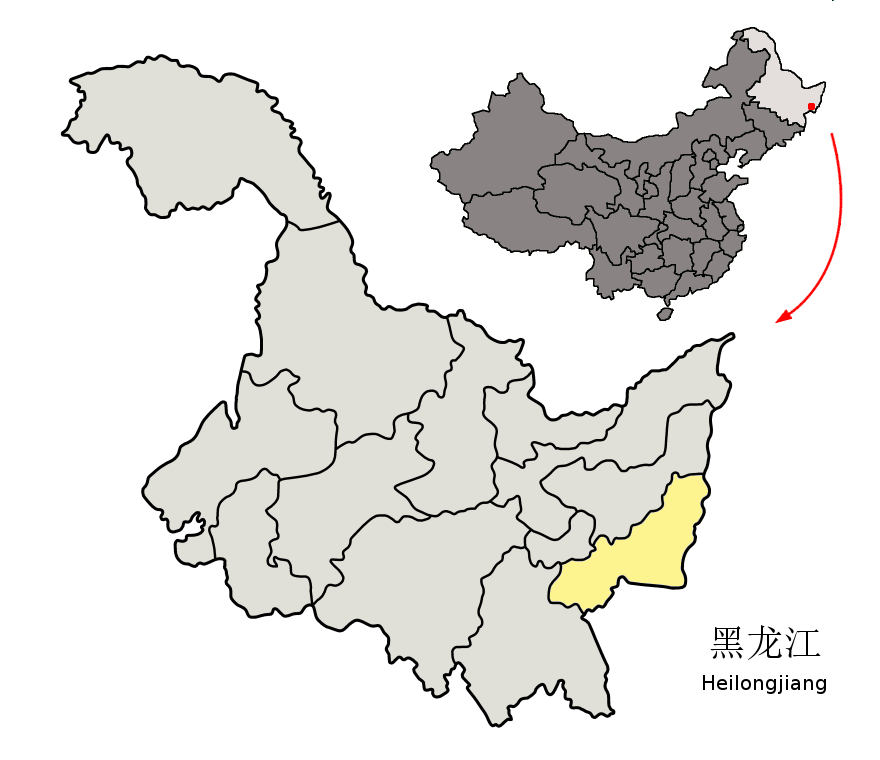
- Location of Jixi City in Heilongjiang
- Coordinates: 45°05′31″N 130°41′49″E
- Country: People's Republic of China
- Province: Heilongjiang
- Prefecture-level city: Jixi

Area
  - Total: 396 km^{2} (153 sq mi)

Population (2003)
  - Total: 89,025
  - Density: 225/km^{2} (582/sq mi)
- Time zone: UTC+8 (China Standard)

Lishu District (simplified Chinese: 梨树区; traditional Chinese: 梨樹區; pinyin: Líshù Qū) is a district of the city of Jixi, Heilongjiang, People's Republic of China.

== Administrative divisions ==
Lishu District is divided into 5 subdistricts and 1 township.

5 subdistricts

- Jieli (街里街道), Muleng (穆棱街道), Pinggang (平岗街道), Jianchang (碱场街道), Shilin (石磷街道)

1 town

- Lishu (梨树镇)
