= Jidong County =

Jidong County 鸡东县
- County
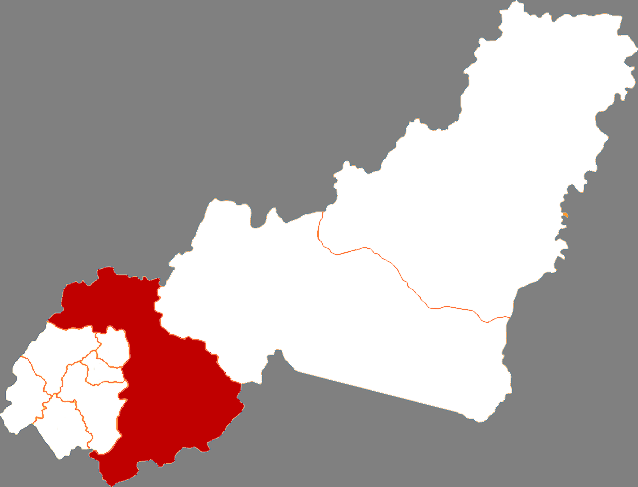

- Location in Heilongjiang
- Coordinates: 45°16′N 131°07′E
- Country: People's Republic of China
- Province: Heilongjiang
- Prefecture-level city: Jixi

Area
  - Total: 3,228.88 km^{2} (1,246.68 sq mi)
- Elevation: 186 m (610 ft)

Population
  - Total: 273,871
- Time zone: UTC+8 (China Standard)

Jidong County (simplified Chinese: 鸡东县; traditional Chinese: 雞東縣; pinyin: Jīdōng Xiàn; lit. 'East of Mount Jiguan') is a county of southeastern Heilongjiang Province, China, bordering Russia's Primorsky Krai to the southeast. It is under the administration of Jixi City and is the location of Jixi Xingkaihu Airport.

== Administrative divisions ==
Jidong County is divided into 8 towns and 3 townships.

8 towns

- Jidong (鸡东镇), Pingyang (平阳镇), Xiangyang (向阳镇), Hada (哈达镇), Yong'an (永安镇), Yonghe (永和镇), Donghai (东海镇), Xingnong (兴农镇)

3 townships

- Jilin (鸡林乡), Mingde (明德乡), Xialiangzi (下亮子乡)

== Climate ==
Climate data for Jidong, elevation 220 m (720 ft), (1991–2020 normals, extremes 1981–2010)
Month	Jan	Feb	Mar	Apr	May	Jun	Jul	Aug	Sep	Oct	Nov	Dec	Year
Record high °C (°F)	5.6 (42.1)	11.1 (52.0)	19.1 (66.4)	30.1 (86.2)	34.8 (94.6)	38.1 (100.6)	37.2 (99.0)	34.8 (94.6)	32.8 (91.0)	28.9 (84.0)	19.3 (66.7)	9.1 (48.4)	38.1 (100.6)
Mean daily maximum °C (°F)	−9.9 (14.2)	−5.2 (22.6)	2.8 (37.0)	13.1 (55.6)	20.6 (69.1)	25.2 (77.4)	27.3 (81.1)	26.4 (79.5)	21.6 (70.9)	13.0 (55.4)	0.9 (33.6)	−8.8 (16.2)	10.6 (51.1)
Daily mean °C (°F)	−15.2 (4.6)	−11.0 (12.2)	−2.7 (27.1)	6.9 (44.4)	14.4 (57.9)	19.6 (67.3)	22.4 (72.3)	21.3 (70.3)	15.4 (59.7)	6.7 (44.1)	−4.3 (24.3)	−13.6 (7.5)	5.0 (41.0)
Mean daily minimum °C (°F)	−19.8 (−3.6)	−16.4 (2.5)	−8.0 (17.6)	0.9 (33.6)	8.6 (47.5)	14.6 (58.3)	18.0 (64.4)	16.9 (62.4)	9.9 (49.8)	1.2 (34.2)	−8.8 (16.2)	−17.8 (0.0)	−0.1 (31.9)
Record low °C (°F)	−36.4 (−33.5)	−30.9 (−23.6)	−24.4 (−11.9)	−9.7 (14.5)	−2.0 (28.4)	5.1 (41.2)	11.4 (52.5)	8.5 (47.3)	−2.5 (27.5)	−11.7 (10.9)	−23.8 (−10.8)	−32.8 (−27.0)	−36.4 (−33.5)
Average precipitation mm (inches)	5.8 (0.23)	4.3 (0.17)	14.7 (0.58)	27.8 (1.09)	62.7 (2.47)	83.4 (3.28)	120.2 (4.73)	103.1 (4.06)	53.8 (2.12)	36.0 (1.42)	18.2 (0.72)	8.6 (0.34)	538.6 (21.21)
Average precipitation days (≥ 0.1 mm)	5.0	4.1	6.7	9.2	12.8	14.7	14.7	13.9	9.7	7.4	6.1	6.5	110.8
Average snowy days	7.6	6.6	9.3	3.8	0.1	0	0	0	0.1	2.2	7.8	8.9	46.4
Average relative humidity (%)	65	59	56	53	59	69	78	79	71	61	62	65	65
Mean monthly sunshine hours	152.1	174.8	203.2	193.2	211.9	214.4	209.7	205.6	212.2	185.9	149.9	140.1	2,253
Percentage possible sunshine	54	59	55	48	46	46	45	48	57	55	53	52	52
Source: China Meteorological Administration
