= Mashan District =

Mashan District 麻山区
- District
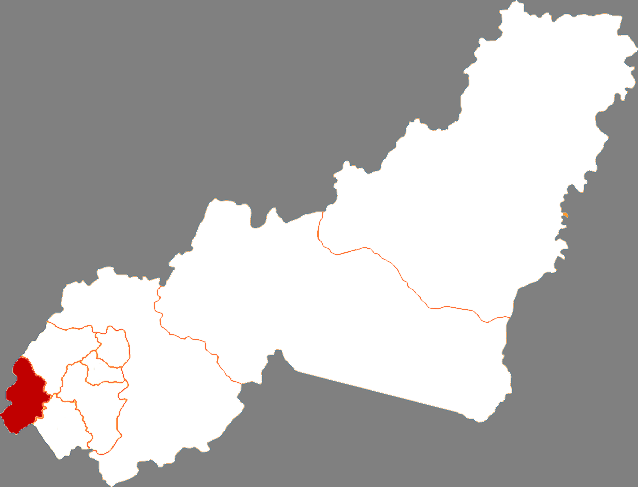
- Location of Mashan District in Jixi

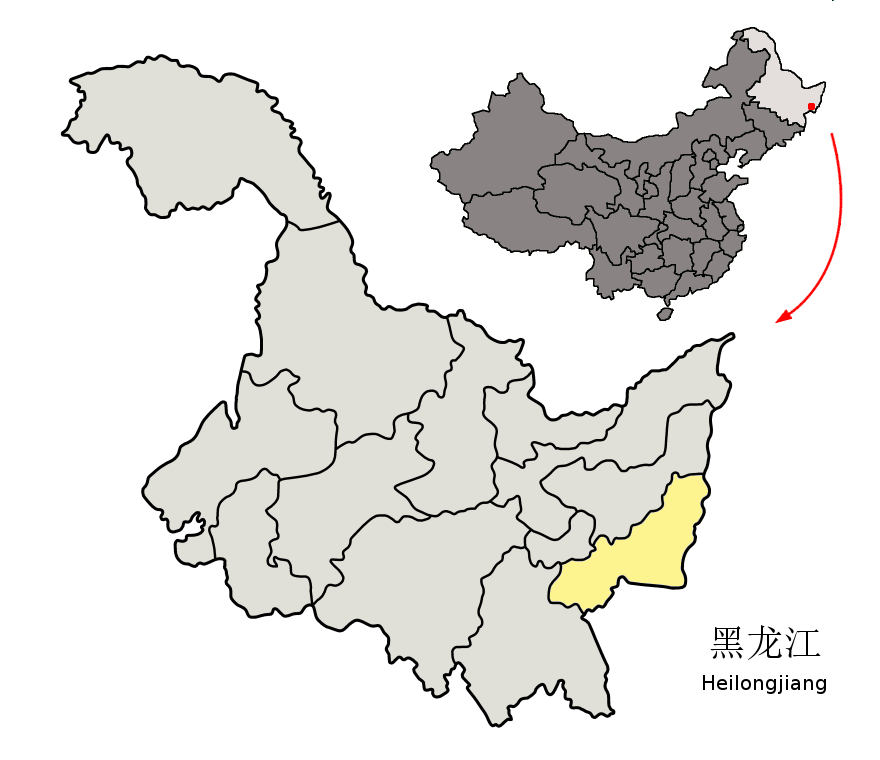
- Jixi in Heilongjiang
- Coordinates: 45°12′44″N 130°28′41″E
- Country: People's Republic of China
- Province: Heilongjiang
- Prefecture-level city: Jixi
- District seat: No.80, Zhongxin Street (中心街80号)

Area
  - Total: 425 km^{2} (164 sq mi)
- Elevation: 309 m (1,014 ft)

Population (2014)
  - Total: 38,000
  - Density: 89/km^{2} (230/sq mi)
- Time zone: UTC+8 (China Standard)
- Postal code: 158100
- Website: jiximashan.gov.cn

Mashan District (simplified Chinese: 麻山区; traditional Chinese: 麻山區; pinyin: Máshān Qū) is a district of the city of Jixi, Heilongjiang, People's Republic of China. It is under the administration of the Jixi city.

== Administrative divisions ==
Mashan District is divided into 1 subdistrict and 1 town.

1 subdistrict

- Mashan (麻山街道)

1 town

- Mashan (麻山镇)
