= Didao District =

Didao District 滴道区
- District
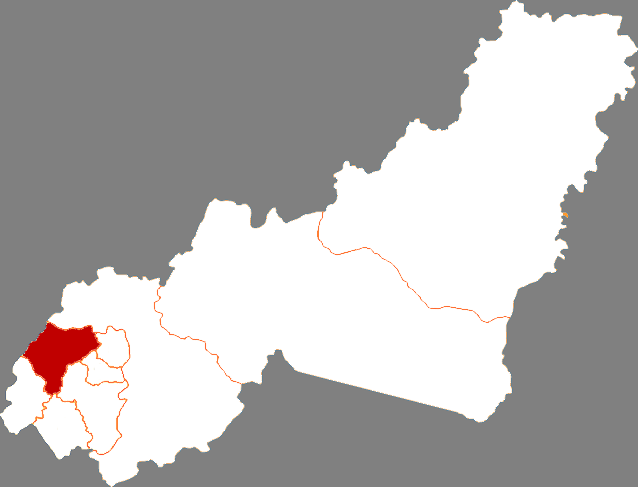
- Location of Didao District in Jixi

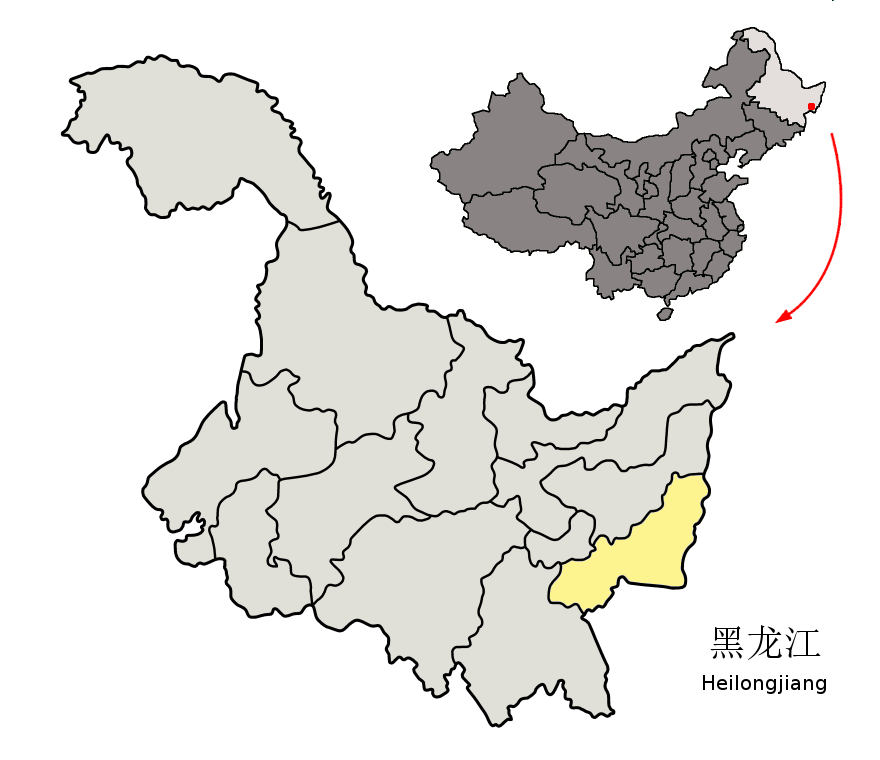
- Jixi in Heilongjiang
- Coordinates: 45°20′55″N 130°50′38″E
- Country: People's Republic of China
- Province: Heilongjiang
- Prefecture-level city: Jixi
- Township-level divisions: 4 subdistricts 2 townships
- District seat: No.850, Zhonghua Road (中华路850号)

Area
  - Total: 614 km^{2} (237 sq mi)
- Elevation: 199 m (653 ft)

Population (2017)
  - Total: 121,000
  - Density: 197/km^{2} (510/sq mi)
- Time zone: UTC+8 (China Standard)
- Postal code: 158150
- Website: didaoqu.gov.cn

Didao (Chinese: 滴道; pinyin: Dīdào) is a district of the city of Jixi, Heilongjiang province, People's Republic of China.

== Administrative divisions ==
There are four subdistricts and two townships in the district:

Subdistricts:

- Dongxing Subdistrict (东兴街道), Kuangli Subdistrict (矿里街道), Ximei Subdistrict (洗煤街道)Datonggou Subdistrict (大通沟街道)

Townships:

- Didaohe Township (滴道河乡), Lanling Township (兰岭乡)
