= Mishan =

Mishan 密山市
- County-level city
- Mishan railway station Dong'an Street Mishan Post Office Lake Xingkai New Kailiu Scenic Area

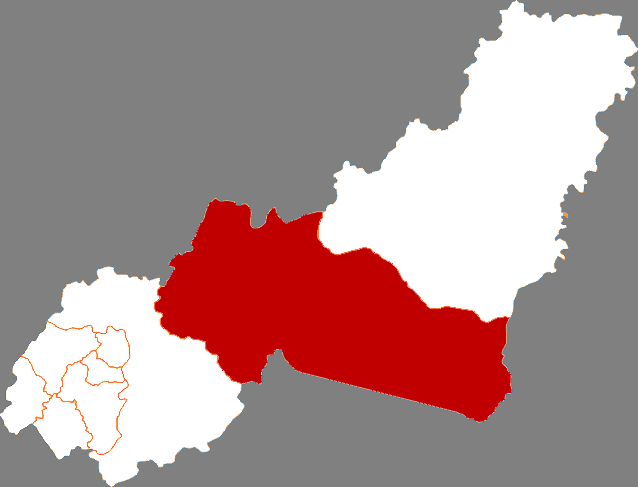

- Location in Heilongjiang
- Coordinates: 45°31′47″N 131°50′48″E
- Country: People's Republic of China
- Province: Heilongjiang
- Prefecture-level city: Jixi

Area
  - Total: 7,722.38 km^{2} (2,981.63 sq mi)

Population
  - Total: 407,451
  - Density: 52.7624/km^{2} (136.654/sq mi)
- Time zone: UTC+8 (China Standard)
- Postal code: 158300
- Area code: 0467
- Climate: Dwb
- Website: www.hljms.gov.cn

Mishan (Chinese: 密山; pinyin: Mìshān) is a county-level city in the southeast of Heilongjiang Province, China, bordering Russia's Primorsky Krai to the south and southeast. It is under the jurisdiction of the prefecture-level city of Jixi.

== History ==
=== Early medieval history ===
From 698 to 936, the kingdom of Balhae occupied northern Korea and parts of Manchuria and Primorsky Krai, consisting of the Nanai, the Udege, and descendants of the Tungus-speaking people and the people of the recently fallen Goguryeo kingdom of Korea. It bordered the Khitan people, the Shiwei people, the Silla people, and the citizens of Heisui Mohe, most of which is located in modern-day China and Mongolia. The vicinity of Tongjiang was settled at this moment by Funie Mohe tribes (Hanja/Hanzi: 拂涅靺鞨; pinyin: Fúniè Mòhé; Korean: 불열말갈). These tribes were submitted to Balhae Kingdom under King Mun's reign (737-793).

Later, King Seon (r.818-830), administered their territories by creating a prefecture in the neighbourhood: The Dongpyong Prefecture (Korean: 동평부; Hanja: 東平府) with Yiju (Korean: 이주; Hanja: 伊州), present-day Dangbi (Chinese: 当壁; pinyin: Dāngbì) as its administrative centre.

== Administrative divisions ==
Mishan City is divided into 1 subdistrict, 8 towns and 8 townships.

1 subdistrict

- Zhongxin (中心街道)

8 towns

- Mishan (密山镇), Lianzhushan (连珠山镇), Dangbi (当壁镇), Zhiyi (知一镇), Heitai (黑台镇), Xingkai (兴凯镇), Peide (裴德镇), Baiyuwan (白鱼湾镇)

8 townships

- Liumao (柳毛乡), Yangmu (杨木乡), Xingkaihu (兴凯湖乡), Chengzihe (承紫河乡), Errenban (二人班乡), Taiping (太平乡), Heping (和平乡), Fuyuan (富源乡)

== Climate ==
Climate data for Mishan, elevation 152 m (499 ft), (1991–2020 normals, extremes 1981–2010)
Month	Jan	Feb	Mar	Apr	May	Jun	Jul	Aug	Sep	Oct	Nov	Dec	Year
Record high °C (°F)	4.8 (40.6)	8.1 (46.6)	18.9 (66.0)	29.3 (84.7)	33.1 (91.6)	34.8 (94.6)	37.2 (99.0)	35.4 (95.7)	31.6 (88.9)	27.8 (82.0)	19.0 (66.2)	6.7 (44.1)	37.2 (99.0)
Mean daily maximum °C (°F)	−11.4 (11.5)	−6.2 (20.8)	2.0 (35.6)	12.3 (54.1)	19.5 (67.1)	24.1 (75.4)	26.6 (79.9)	25.6 (78.1)	20.9 (69.6)	12.3 (54.1)	0.0 (32.0)	−9.9 (14.2)	9.7 (49.4)
Daily mean °C (°F)	−16.2 (2.8)	−11.6 (11.1)	−3.2 (26.2)	6.3 (43.3)	13.7 (56.7)	18.9 (66.0)	22.0 (71.6)	20.8 (69.4)	15.0 (59.0)	6.4 (43.5)	−4.8 (23.4)	−14.3 (6.3)	4.4 (39.9)
Mean daily minimum °C (°F)	−20.4 (−4.7)	−16.7 (1.9)	−8.5 (16.7)	0.6 (33.1)	8.1 (46.6)	14.1 (57.4)	17.8 (64.0)	16.6 (61.9)	9.6 (49.3)	1.1 (34.0)	−9.1 (15.6)	−18.3 (−0.9)	−0.4 (31.2)
Record low °C (°F)	−34.2 (−29.6)	−30.3 (−22.5)	−26.2 (−15.2)	−9.7 (14.5)	−1.2 (29.8)	5.3 (41.5)	11.0 (51.8)	7.5 (45.5)	−2.1 (28.2)	−11.9 (10.6)	−24.2 (−11.6)	−29.8 (−21.6)	−34.2 (−29.6)
Average precipitation mm (inches)	6.2 (0.24)	4.3 (0.17)	14.4 (0.57)	26.2 (1.03)	64.7 (2.55)	83.4 (3.28)	121.9 (4.80)	119.1 (4.69)	59.9 (2.36)	36.1 (1.42)	17.8 (0.70)	8.4 (0.33)	562.4 (22.14)
Average precipitation days (≥ 0.1 mm)	5.3	3.8	6.1	8.2	12.4	13.3	13.4	13.5	10.1	8.0	6.1	6.4	106.6
Average snowy days	8.8	6.8	9.8	4.5	0.1	0	0	0	0	2.5	8.1	10.0	50.6
Average relative humidity (%)	66	61	57	56	63	73	80	81	74	64	63	68	67
Mean monthly sunshine hours	161.7	187.8	223.8	212.6	230.1	236.2	220.2	220.1	224.0	192.7	158.6	144.6	2,412.4
Percentage possible sunshine	57	64	60	52	50	50	47	51	60	57	56	54	55
Source: China Meteorological Administration

== Sister cities ==
- Juneau, Alaska (United States)

== See also ==
- List of Provinces of Balhae
