= Wanda Mountains =

Mountains in Heilongjiang Province, China

Coordinates: 45°53′30″N 132°13′30″E

The Wanda Mountains (simplified Chinese: 完达山; traditional Chinese: 完達山; pinyin: Wándá shān) are located in the Heilongjiang Province of China.

The forests on the mountains are home to many rare species of plants and fungi. Among these include: black fungus, zhenmo, and wei or cinnamon fern (Osmunda cinnamomea).

Lake Jingpo is also located near this mountain range.
