= Jixi =

Jixi 鸡西市 Kisih, Kihsi
- Prefecture-level city
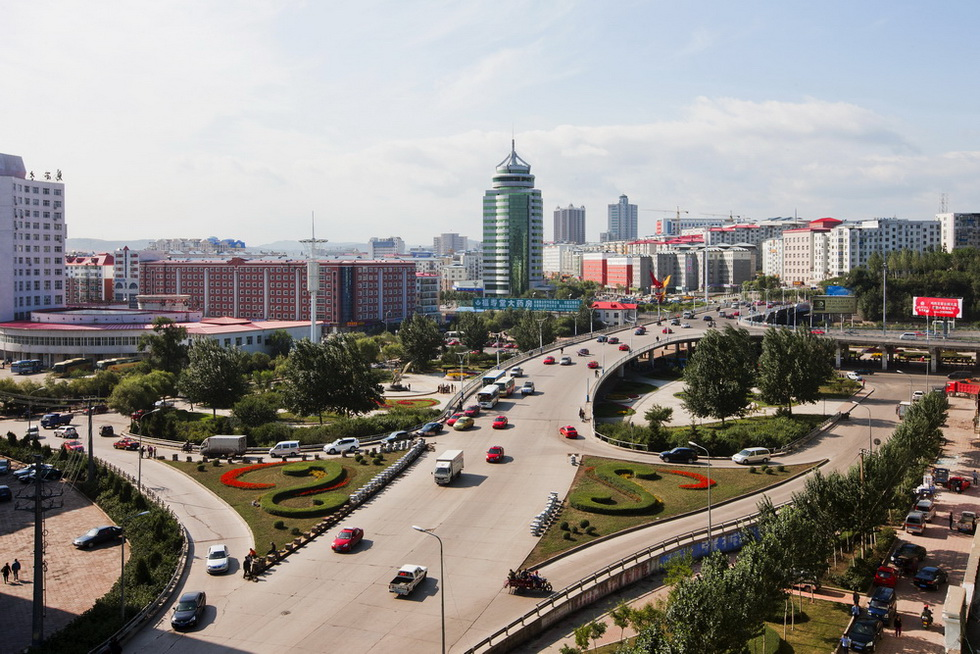
- Muling River Wanda Plaza Tengfei Overpass Jinzhou Building Xinhua Street Hulin Muling River Park Lake Xingkai, Mishan

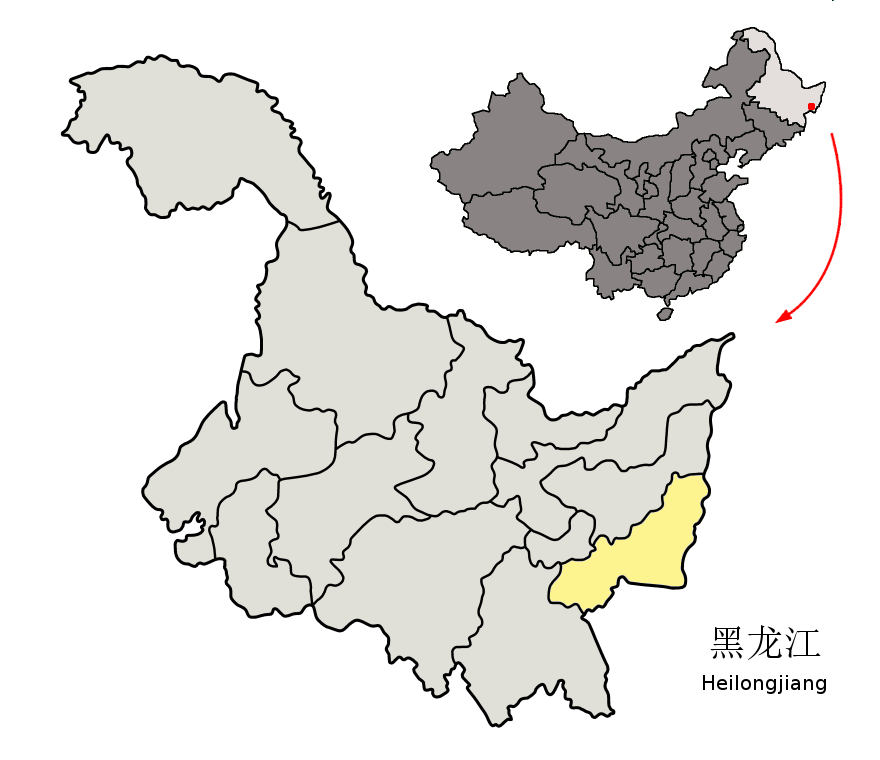
- Location of Jixi (yellow) in Heilongjiang (light grey) and China

- Location of the city centre in Heilongjiang
- Coordinates (Jixi municipal government): 45°17′42″N 130°58′08″E
- Country: People's Republic of China
- Province: Heilongjiang
- County-level divisions: 6 districts; 2 county-level cities; 1 county
- Township divisions: 459
- Incorporated (town): September 1, 1941
- Incorporated (city): March 7, 1957
- Municipal seat: Jiguan District

Government
  - Type: Prefecture-level city
  - Mayor: Zhang Changrong (张常荣)
  - CPC Jixi Secretary: Kang Zhiwen (康志文)

Area
  - Prefecture-level city: 22,488.47 km^{2} (8,682.85 sq mi)
  - Urban: 2,208.5 km^{2} (852.7 sq mi)
  - Metro: 899.1 km^{2} (347.1 sq mi)
- Elevation: 230 m (750 ft)

Population (2020 census)
  - Prefecture-level city: 1,502,060
  - Density: 66.7924/km^{2} (172.992/sq mi)
  - Urban: 683,232
  - Urban density: 309.36/km^{2} (801.25/sq mi)
  - Metro: 560,118
  - Metro density: 623.0/km^{2} (1,614/sq mi)
  - Major nationalities: Han – 95%; Korean – 3%; Manchu – 2%

GDP
  - Prefecture-level city: CN¥ 51.5 billion US$ 8.3 billion
  - Per capita: CN¥28,223; US$4,531
- Time zone: UTC+8 (China Standard)
- Postal code: 158100
- Area code: 0467
- ISO 3166 code: CN-HL-03
- Administrative division code: 230300
- License Plate Prefix: 黑G
- Climate: Dwb
- Website: www.jixi.gov.cn

Jixi
- "Jixi", as written in Chinese

Chinese name
- Simplified Chinese: 鸡西
- Traditional Chinese: 鷄西
Transcriptions
Standard Mandarin
- Hanyu Pinyin: Jīxī

Manchu name
- Manchu script: ᡤᡳᡥᡳ
- Romanization: Gihi

Russian name
- Russian: Цзиси

Jixi (simplified Chinese: 鸡西; traditional Chinese: 雞西; pinyin: Jīxī) is a city in southeastern Heilongjiang Province, People's Republic of China. At the 2020 census, 1,502,060 people resided within its administrative area of 22,488.47 square kilometres (8,682.85 sq mi) and 560,118 in its built-up (or metro) area made up of 3 out of 6 urban districts (including Jiguan, Hengshan and Chengzihe). By the end of 2024, the total registered population of the city is 1,593,200, of which the urban population is 1,006 million. Jixi is on the Muling River about 30 km (19 mi) from the border with Russia's Primorsky Krai and 120 km (75 mi) from Lake Xingkai. The mayor of Jixi is Zhang Changrong (张常荣) since June 2015. The area is one of the important coal mining bases in China. A crater on asteroid 253 Mathilde was named after the city.

== History ==
=== Ancient times ===
Jixi was ruled by the Jurchen and Goguryeo people. By the Shang dynasty, dwellers here had begun to communicate with people in the Central Plain. It was in the Han dynasty that primitive agriculture in this region had made great progress. During the Tang dynasty, Jixi was under the control of the Balhae. As the Manchus conquered the territories occupied by the Ming dynasty in 1644, the basin of the Amur River was blocked in order to protect the Manchu people's place of origin. In this period, the population of the Jixi region experienced a sharp decrease. In 1662, the Kangxi Emperor ordered the general of Ninguta to dominate the territory. Since a large number of people engaged in reclaiming wasteland and collecting ginseng, Jixi and the whole Ussuri River basin gradually became the base for medicinal materials.

=== Early modern period ===
In the second half of the 19th century, as Czarist Russia advanced through Siberia and reached the Sea of Okhotsk, the Qing officials like General Tepuqin (特普欽) made a proposal to open Manchuria for farming in order to oppose the conquest of Russia, and so the Qing government forsook the policy of blockading on the Northeast region of China. A large number of the Han Chinese, especially from the Shandong Peninsula and Zhili, migrated into Manchuria. The Qing government set up Mishan Prefecture in this territory in 1908. Coal resources were discovered constantly in Jixi during this period. In September 1914, a merchant named Yuan Dazhang (袁大章) from Mukden was approved to set up the Mixi Coal Mine Company, which represents the regular production of coal in Jixi. However, construction of Chinese Eastern Railway one of the provisions brought a nucleus of Russian Jews to northern Manchuria. In January 1924, Muling Coal Mine Corporation was operated jointly by the Jewish businessman Solomon L. Skidelsky and the Jilin Province government. The headquarters of the company was located on Ashihe Street, Nangang District, Harbin. The output of Muling Colliery has reached 1.6 million tons in 1931. Since The Japanese invasion of Manchuria began on September 19, 1931, the whole of Manchuria was seized by Japan following the Mukden Incident, and in 1932, a sympathetic government, Manchukuo, was established. The Jixi region then became a colony of the Japanese. On December 15, 1935, Jixi Railway Station's construction was completed by South Manchuria Railway(SMR). On September 1, 1941, the Manchukuo government established Jining County (鶏寧縣). The first mayor of the county was Kubota Yutaka (久保田 豊). The Japanese settlers brutally slaughtered more than 100 thousand miners in the Jixi mining area, leaving several mass graves in Didao. On August 9, 1945, Togashi Ichiro (冨樫 一郎), the conductor of Didao Colliery, ordered the destruction of the coalpits in Hengshan, Didao and Muling as the Soviet Red Army closed in.

=== Modern era ===
On August 12, 1945, the Soviet Army captured Jining County, and the Military Headquarters commanded the Jixi mining area to resume production. On October 18, 1947, Jixi Mining Bureau was founded in order to control the collieries and the Coal Mine Machinery Factory. On July 30, 1949, the Northeast Executive Committee allowed Jining County to change its name to Jixi County, which was administered by Songjiang Province. On June 19, 1954, Jixi County was administered by Heilongjiang Province as the Songjiang Province became part of Heilongjiang province.

During the First Five-Year Plan of China, several industrial projects including Chengzihe No.9 subvertical and the Chengzihe Coal Washery were constructed. By 1956, the population of Jixi had reached 234,154, and the output of coal rose to 5 million tons per year. On December 18, 1956, the State Council of China decided to set up Jixi City (Prefectural-Level) instead of Jixi County, administering 5 districts including Jiguan, Didao, Mashan, Hengshan and Lishu. On March 7, Jixi City was formally established. In 1970, Chengzihe District was established. In 1983, Jidong County was put under Jixi's administration. The coal-mining industry was developing rapidly during the 1970s and 1980s. By 1991, the total coal output of Jixi ranked second in mainland China. In the 1980s, Mishan and Hulin were incorporated into Jixi's jurisdiction. Jixi has reached its current domain.

== Geography ==
Jixi is located at the southern edge of the Sanjiang or Three Rivers Plain. Bordering prefecture cities are:

- Mudanjiang (SW)
- Qitaihe (N)
- Shuangyashan (N)

It also borders Russia's Primorsky Krai to the southeast. The city is located within latitude 44° 51'−46° 36' N and longitude 130° 24'−133° 56' E, and has an administrative area of 22,351 square kilometres (8,630 sq mi). Much of the prefecture area sits within the conjunction region between the Changbai Mountains and the Wanda Mountains. Within its borders, Lake Xingkai is the largest lake with an area of 4,380 square kilometres (1,691 sq mi), while the Muling River, Songacha River and the Ussuri River are the largest rivers in the prefecture.

=== Climate ===
Jixi has a monsoon-influenced, humid continental climate (Köppen Dwb/Dwa), with bitter but dry winters, and warm, humid summers. However, due to the relative proximity to the Sea of Japan, summer is comparatively cool and refreshing while the climate here is affected and coordinated by the marine climate. The monthly 24-hour average temperature ranges from −16.0 °C (3.2 °F) in January to 21.7 °C (71.1 °F) in July, and the annual mean is 4.52 °C (40.1 °F). With monthly percent possible sunshine ranging from 50% in July to 68% in February, the city receives abundant sunshine, with 2,564 hours of bright sunshine annually. Extreme temperatures have ranged from −35.1 °C (−31 °F) on 12 January 1951 to 37.6 °C (100 °F) on 24 July 1999.

Climate data for Jixi, elevation 273 m (896 ft), (1991–2020 normals, extremes 1951–present)
Month	Jan	Feb	Mar	Apr	May	Jun	Jul	Aug	Sep	Oct	Nov	Dec	Year
Record high °C (°F)	4.5 (40.1)	10.9 (51.6)	20.0 (68.0)	29.8 (85.6)	34.6 (94.3)	37.4 (99.3)	37.6 (99.7)	36.5 (97.7)	32.9 (91.2)	28.2 (82.8)	18.5 (65.3)	9.6 (49.3)	37.6 (99.7)
Mean daily maximum °C (°F)	−10.4 (13.3)	−5.4 (22.3)	2.4 (36.3)	12.8 (55.0)	20.2 (68.4)	24.9 (76.8)	27.2 (81.0)	25.9 (78.6)	21.1 (70.0)	12.5 (54.5)	0.5 (32.9)	−8.9 (16.0)	10.2 (50.4)
Daily mean °C (°F)	−15.6 (3.9)	−11.2 (11.8)	−3.0 (26.6)	6.7 (44.1)	14.0 (57.2)	19.2 (66.6)	22.1 (71.8)	20.8 (69.4)	14.9 (58.8)	6.5 (43.7)	−4.5 (23.9)	−13.6 (7.5)	4.7 (40.4)
Mean daily minimum °C (°F)	−19.8 (−3.6)	−16.0 (3.2)	−8.1 (17.4)	1.1 (34.0)	8.2 (46.8)	14.0 (57.2)	17.7 (63.9)	16.4 (61.5)	9.5 (49.1)	1.4 (34.5)	−8.6 (16.5)	−17.4 (0.7)	−0.1 (31.8)
Record low °C (°F)	−35.1 (−31.2)	−30.5 (−22.9)	−26.1 (−15.0)	−13.0 (8.6)	−4.9 (23.2)	2.6 (36.7)	5.5 (41.9)	5.5 (41.9)	−3.9 (25.0)	−13.1 (8.4)	−28.6 (−19.5)	−33.3 (−27.9)	−35.1 (−31.2)
Average precipitation mm (inches)	6.1 (0.24)	4.3 (0.17)	11.9 (0.47)	23.0 (0.91)	63.2 (2.49)	91.2 (3.59)	115.7 (4.56)	118.1 (4.65)	54.4 (2.14)	33.8 (1.33)	17.1 (0.67)	8.8 (0.35)	547.6 (21.57)
Average precipitation days (≥ 0.1 mm)	5.2	4.4	6.9	8.3	12.8	14.1	14.4	13.5	9.7	7.9	6.9	7.0	111.1
Average snowy days	8.5	6.9	10.0	4.7	0.2	0	0	0	0.1	2.7	7.9	9.4	50.4
Average relative humidity (%)	64	59	55	51	58	70	78	80	71	61	62	66	65
Mean monthly sunshine hours	179.6	197.9	230.1	221.6	236.0	241.0	229.8	223.1	233.9	204.8	168.1	157.2	2,523.1
Percentage possible sunshine	63	67	62	54	51	52	49	52	63	61	60	58	58
Source: China Meteorological Administration extremes

== Administrative divisions and population ==
Mishan, Jixi

The prefecture-level city of Jixi has direct jurisdiction over 6 districts (区; qū), 1 county (县; xiàn) and 2 county-level cities (县级市; xiànjí shì):

Map
#	Name	Hanzi	Hanyu Pinyin	Population (2010 census)	Area (km2)	Density (/km2)
1	Jiguan District	鸡冠区	Jīguān Qū	365,385	145.5	2,511
2	Hengshan District	恒山区	Héngshān Qū	160,180	575.27	278
3	Didao District	滴道区	Dīdào Qū	103,646	507.24	204
4	Lishu District	梨树区	Líshù Qū	76,361	391.99	195
5	Chengzihe District	城子河区	Chéngzǐhé Qū	127,290	178.29	714
6	Mashan District	麻山区	Máshān Qū	30,097	410.21	73
7	Hulin City	虎林市	Hǔlín Shì	317,884	9,328.71	34
8	Mishan City	密山市	Mìshān Shì	407,451	7,722.38	53
9	Jidong County	鸡东县	Jīdōng Xiàn	273,871	3,228.88	85

=== Nationality ===
The 2000 national survey ethnic composition proportion

Nationality	Population	Ratio
Han Chinese	1,852,345	95.19%
Korean	50,580	2.6%
Manchu	33,512	1.7%
Mongol	4,184	0.22%
Hui	3,270	0.17%
Miao	408	0.02%
Xibe	356	0.02%
Zhuang	308	0.02%
Tujia	229	0.01%
Else	865	0.05%

== Transportation ==
=== Railway ===
Jixi is linked by rail to the line from Jiamusi to Mudanjiang and has branch lines running to the Russian border areas. In Jixi Railway Station, there are multiple daily departures to other cities in China such as Beijing, Harbin, Qiqihar and Mudanjiang. Jixi is also famous as the home of the last remaining working steam locomotive in China.

=== Highway ===
Jixi is linked to the national highway network through the G11 Hegang–Dalian Expressway, the Fangzheng-Hulin Highway and the busiest section in the city, the Jixi-Hulin-Jiansanjiang Expressway. This section connects the four major districts in Jixi including Jiguan District, Jidong, Mishan and Hulin.

=== Air ===
Jixi Xingkaihu Airport opened in 2009 and serves as the main civilian airport for Jixi. It takes about 30 minutes to reach downtown from the airport. Domestic flights are available to several cities including Beijing, Shanghai, Harbin and Qingdao.

== Economy ==
- GDP and economic data

Statistically, Jixi's GDP reached RMB 41.95 billion in 2010, representing a steady growth of 16.1% from a year earlier, ranked seventh among the 13 prefectures and prefecture-level cities in the province. In 2010, value-added industrial output generated by enterprises with designated size or above rose 42.6% to RMB 9.51 billion. In 2010, the foreign trade value of Jixi totaled US$710.01 million, up 41.7% year on year. Russia is the largest export destination.

- Economic Features

The most important pillar industry in Jixi is coal mining. The economy of Jixi is mainly constructed around rich coal resources. Jixi is estimated to have about 8 billion tons of coal reserves, ranking 2nd out of 13 prefectures and prefecture-level cities in Heilongjiang Province. Coal chemical industry, metallurgy and machinery are predominant. The environmental protection industry, agriculture and tourist industries are also developing rapidly in recent years. However, Coal still accounts for the main part of the entire economic system. Other pillar industries in Jixi include pharmaceuticals, food manufacturing, non-metal products and electricity production and supply. Large industrial companies are hosted in Jixi such as Huawei Wood and Heilongjiang Rixin Food, which is mainly engaged in edible fungus processing. The food company has annual processing capacity of 2,500 tons of edible fungus. The graphite reserves of Jixi amount to 780 million tons, ranking first in all of Asia. With the Khanka Lake being shared with Russia and the Muling River running through the city, Chinese medicinal herbs and freshwater resources are also rich.

== Tourism ==
Tourist sites in Jixi City itself include Jixi Museum in the west end of the city, and Huayan Temple (华严寺) which almost faces the museum across Wenhua Road. Within roughly an hour's drive is the Qi Lin Shan (麒麟山) scenic area.

A few hours east of the city within the Jixi administrative region is the Russian lake and river border, a number of points along which are popular summer destinations for tourists in particular:

=== Hutou Fortress ===
Hutou Fortress was a Japanese military base of the Kwantung Army in northeast China on the Sino-Soviet border which is known as "Oriental Maginot Line". The Japanese built a large scale military fortress in Hutou, since it was regarded, by the leader of Kwantung Army, as a dagger facing the defensive line between Vladivostok and Khabarovsk. On August 26, 1945, the Soviet Red Army finally captured the Fort. As the Hutou battle ended, Japan's unconditional surrender came 11 days later. Only 53 of the 1,400 Japanese soldiers survived one of the last campaigns of the Second World War. A Study on the Hutou Fortress Battle between Japan and the Soviet Union took place in 2009, by the Social Science Academy of Heilongjiang Province, entitled "The end of World War II".

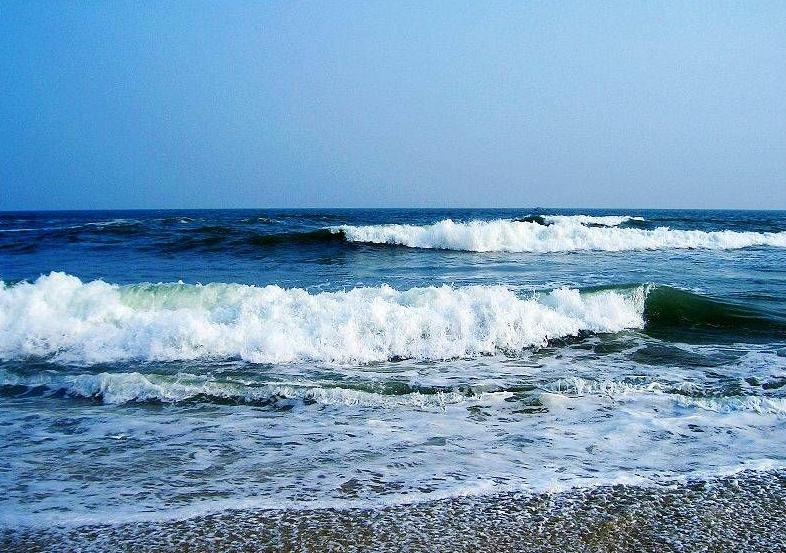
Scenic Spot of Khanka Lake

=== Ussuri River ===
Ussuri River is the largest tributary of Amur River(Heilong River) on its right and an important boundary river between China and Russia. The length of Ussuri River is 905 km (562 mi), with a drainage area of 187,000 km^{2} (72,000 sq mi). The river goes through the valley between the Wanda Mountains in China and the Sichote-Alin in Russia. Its beauty and natural landscapes are incomparable in China and it is among the few unpolluted rivers in China.

=== Zhenbao Island ===
Zhenbao Island stands for the Island of Treasure in Chinese Language. On March 2, 1969, Sino-Soviet battles Zhenbao Island took place resulting in large-scale armed conflict. Now it has become a Nature Reserve and a National Forest Park.

=== Influence of ethnic Koreans ===
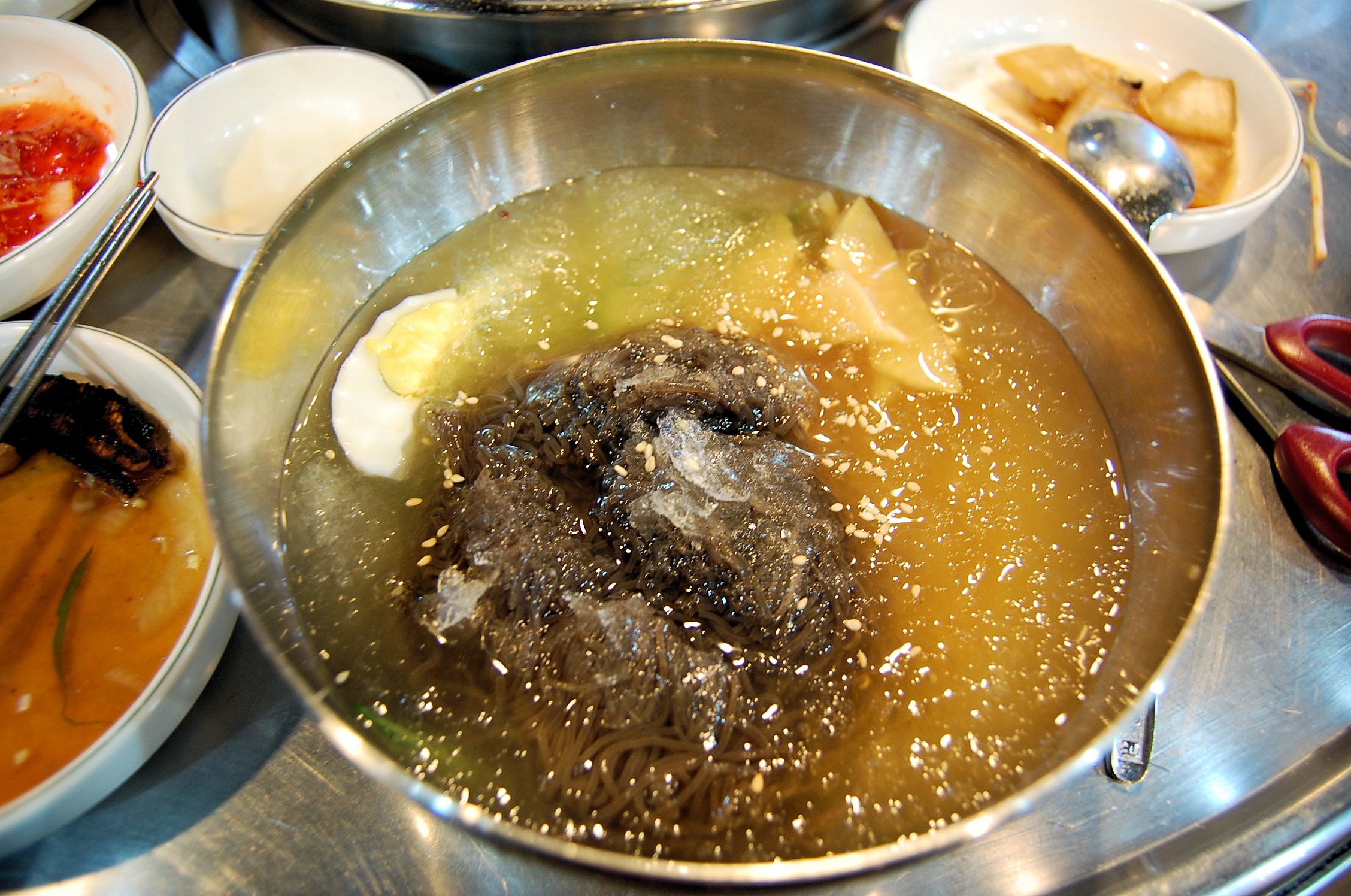
Cold Noodle (Naengmyeon)

The Jixi region is known for its Korean ethnic minority. Cold Noodle (Naengmyeon in Korean, Leng Mian in Chinese), a traditional Korean dish made from wheat or buckwheat, is particularly associated with Jixi. The contemporary dish is a fusion of Korean and Northeastern Chinese flavors and derives its name from its distinctly cold taste. The noodles are often served with dried bean curd, Campanulaceae, and Pollack, amongst other ingredients. Also consumed by locals is Korean-style fish-kettle.

== Sister cities ==
=== Domestic ===
- Shiyan, Hubei
- Zhaoqing, Guangdong
- Xiamen, Fujian
- Changsha, Hunan
- Anshan, Liaoning

=== International ===
- Lesozavodsk, Primorsky Krai, Russia
- Samcheok, Gangwon, South Korea
