= Hulin =

Hulin 虎林市
- County-level city
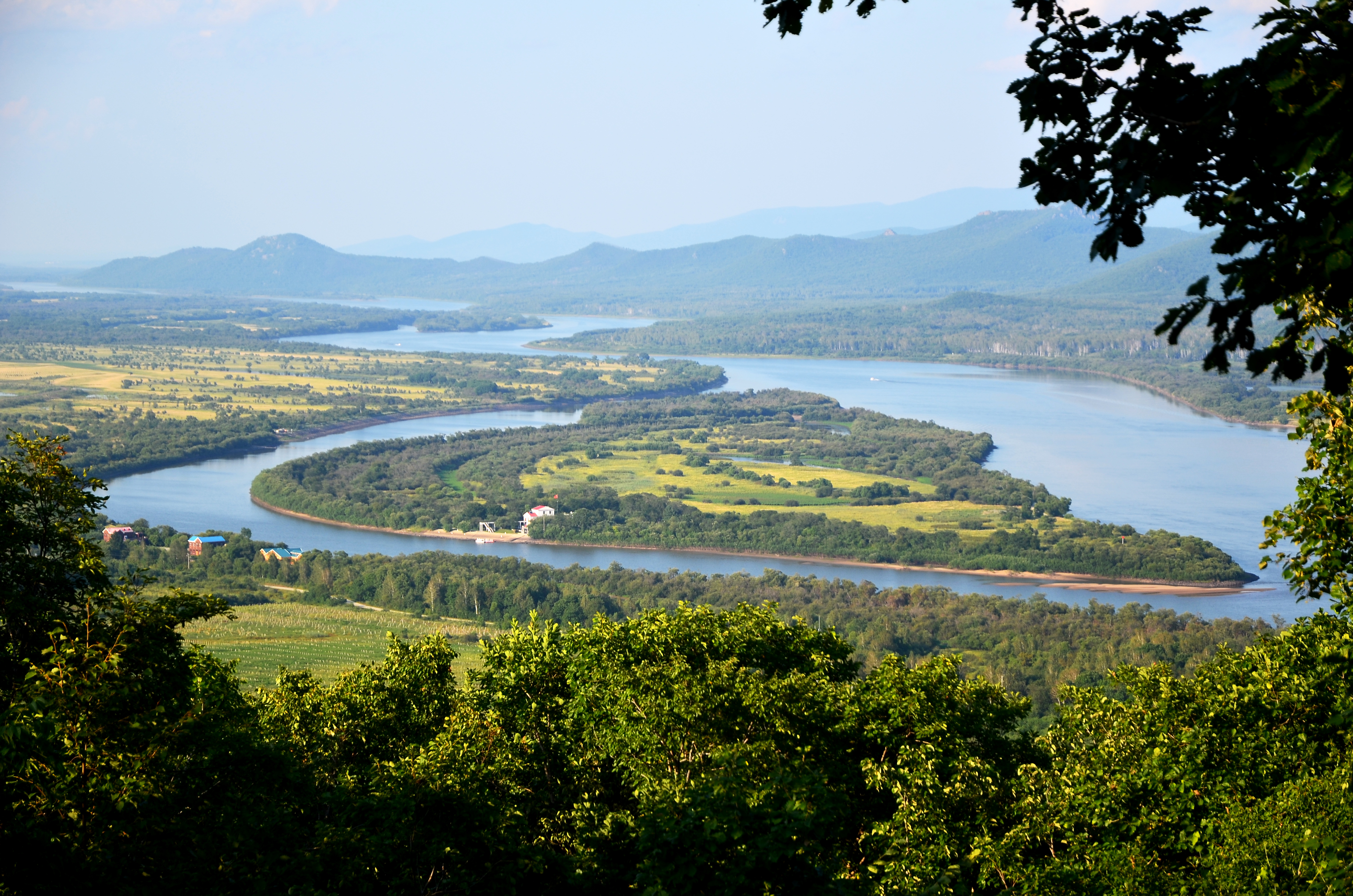
- Hulin railway station Zhenbao Island Pedestrian mall in Hulin Street in Hulin Hutou Scenic Area

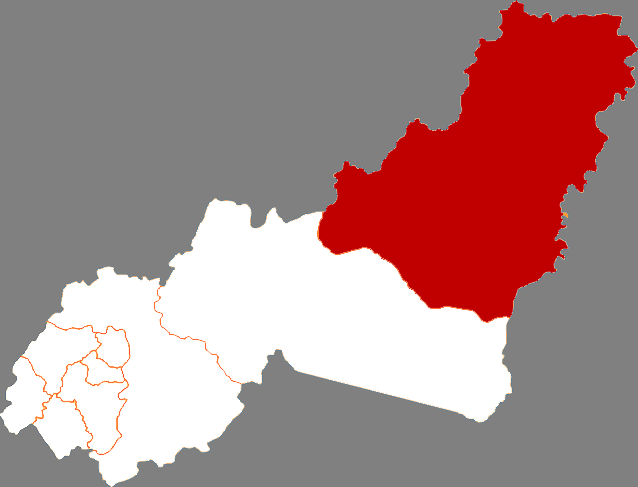
- Location of the city

- Location in Heilongjiang
- Coordinates: 45°46′N 132°56′E
- Country: People's Republic of China
- Province: Heilongjiang
- Prefecture-level city: Jixi
- Municipal seat: Hulin Town (虎林镇)

Area
  - Total: 9,328.71 km^{2} (3,601.84 sq mi)
- Elevation: 85 m (279 ft)

Population (2010)
  - Total: 317,884
  - Density: 34.0759/km^{2} (88.2561/sq mi)
- Time zone: UTC+8 (China Standard)
- Postal code: 230381
- Climate: Dwb
- Website: hljhulin.gov.cn

Hulin (Chinese: 虎林; pinyin: Hǔlín; lit. 'tiger forest') is a county-level city on the Muling River in southeastern Heilongjiang province, People's Republic of China. With a population of around 200,000, it is under the administration of Jixi. Nearby are Lake Xingkai, 51 kilometres (32 mi) to the southwest, the Usuri River, which forms the Russian border 38 kilometres (24 mi) to the east. The main agricultural products include soybeans, cattle, milk, various organic produces, and lumber.

== Geography and climate ==
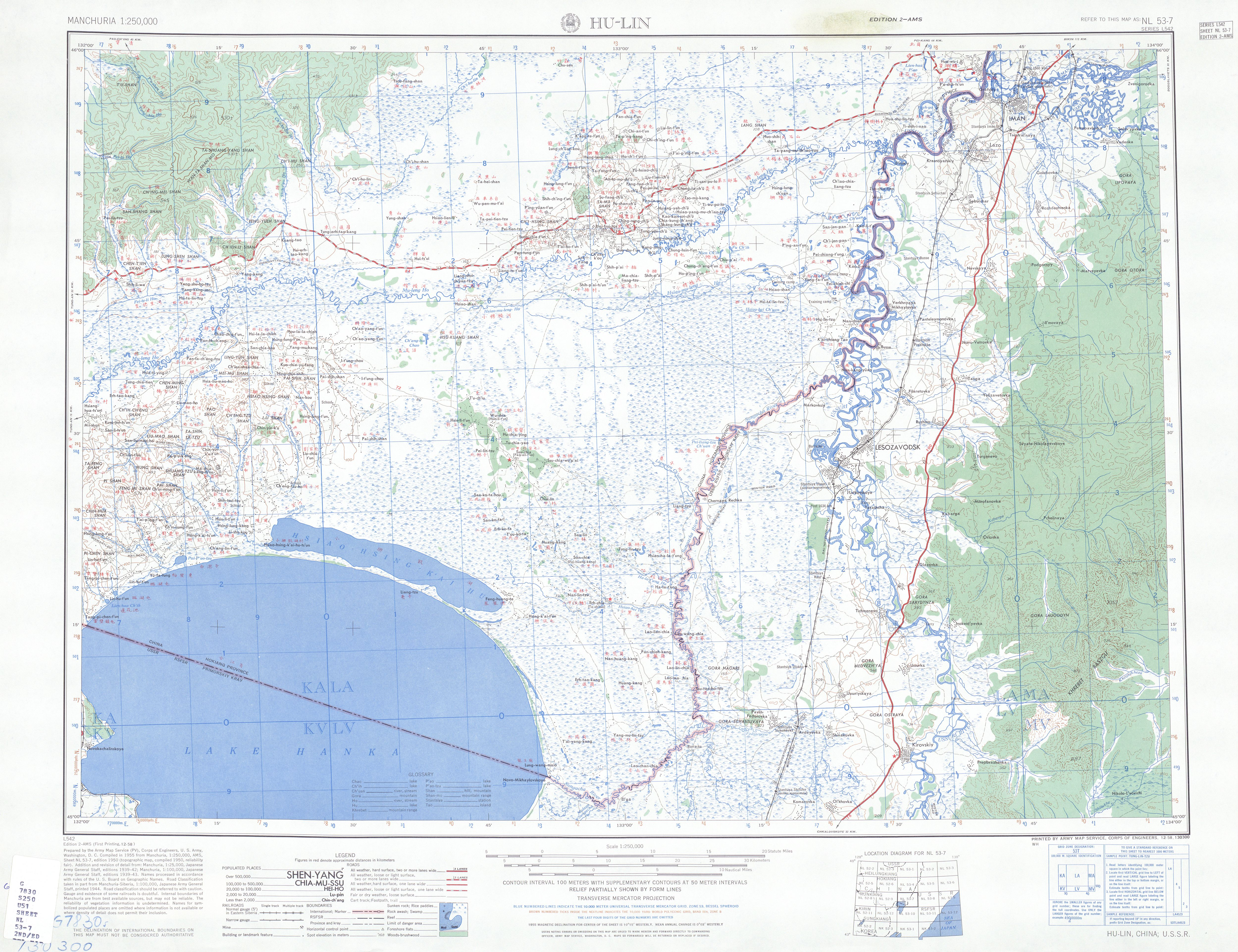
Hulin (labelled as Hu-lin) (1955)

Hulin has a monsoon-influenced humid continental climate (Köppen Dwb), with long, bitterly cold, but dry winters, and warm, humid summers. The monthly 24-hour average temperature ranges from −17.9 °C (0 °F) in January to 21.5 °C (71 °F) in July, and the annual mean is 3.8 °C (38.8 °F). More than 2/3 of the year's precipitation occurs from June to September.

Climate data for Hulin, elevation 98 m (322 ft), (1991–2020 normals, extremes 1971–present)
Month	Jan	Feb	Mar	Apr	May	Jun	Jul	Aug	Sep	Oct	Nov	Dec	Year
Record high °C (°F)	2.1 (35.8)	7.9 (46.2)	17.0 (62.6)	26.2 (79.2)	32.0 (89.6)	38.2 (100.8)	35.2 (95.4)	34.7 (94.5)	32.1 (89.8)	25.2 (77.4)	17.4 (63.3)	5.0 (41.0)	38.2 (100.8)
Mean daily maximum °C (°F)	−12.3 (9.9)	−7.2 (19.0)	1.3 (34.3)	11.6 (52.9)	19.1 (66.4)	23.7 (74.7)	26.4 (79.5)	25.6 (78.1)	20.9 (69.6)	12.2 (54.0)	−0.4 (31.3)	−10.4 (13.3)	9.2 (48.6)
Daily mean °C (°F)	−17.5 (0.5)	−12.8 (9.0)	−3.7 (25.3)	6.0 (42.8)	13.5 (56.3)	18.7 (65.7)	21.9 (71.4)	21.0 (69.8)	15.1 (59.2)	6.5 (43.7)	−5.0 (23.0)	−15.2 (4.6)	4.0 (39.3)
Mean daily minimum °C (°F)	−22.3 (−8.1)	−18.3 (−0.9)	−8.7 (16.3)	0.8 (33.4)	8.2 (46.8)	14.3 (57.7)	18.1 (64.6)	17.0 (62.6)	10.1 (50.2)	1.5 (34.7)	−9.4 (15.1)	−19.7 (−3.5)	−0.7 (30.7)
Record low °C (°F)	−34.7 (−30.5)	−32.2 (−26.0)	−30.3 (−22.5)	−11.0 (12.2)	−3.4 (25.9)	5.0 (41.0)	10.6 (51.1)	6.1 (43.0)	−2.6 (27.3)	−14.4 (6.1)	−27.6 (−17.7)	−32.2 (−26.0)	−34.7 (−30.5)
Average precipitation mm (inches)	9.2 (0.36)	7.4 (0.29)	20.6 (0.81)	34.2 (1.35)	68.0 (2.68)	83.0 (3.27)	120.7 (4.75)	119.4 (4.70)	69.4 (2.73)	47.7 (1.88)	23.7 (0.93)	15.1 (0.59)	618.4 (24.34)
Average precipitation days (≥ 0.1 mm)	6.8	5.5	8.0	9.6	12.7	13.0	13.5	13.1	9.9	8.9	7.6	8.2	116.8
Average snowy days	10.1	8.5	11.0	4.7	0.1	0	0	0	0	2.9	9.4	12.1	58.8
Average relative humidity (%)	70	66	63	61	65	75	81	82	76	67	67	71	70
Mean monthly sunshine hours	171.6	195.5	238.8	226.6	242.2	230.2	223.1	221.1	225.0	196.4	162.1	148.8	2,481.4
Percentage possible sunshine	61	66	64	56	52	49	47	51	60	59	58	55	57
Source 1: China Meteorological Administration All-time Oct extreme
Source 2: Weather China

== Administrative divisions ==
Hulin City is divided into 7 towns and 4 townships.

7 towns

- Hulin (虎林镇), Dongfanghong (东方红镇), Yingchun (迎春镇), Hutou (虎头镇), Yanggang (杨岗镇), Dongcheng (东诚镇), Baodong (宝东镇)

4 townships

- Xinyue (新乐乡), Weiguang (伟光乡), Zhenbaodao (珍宝岛乡), Abei (阿北乡)

== See also ==
- Zhenbao Island
