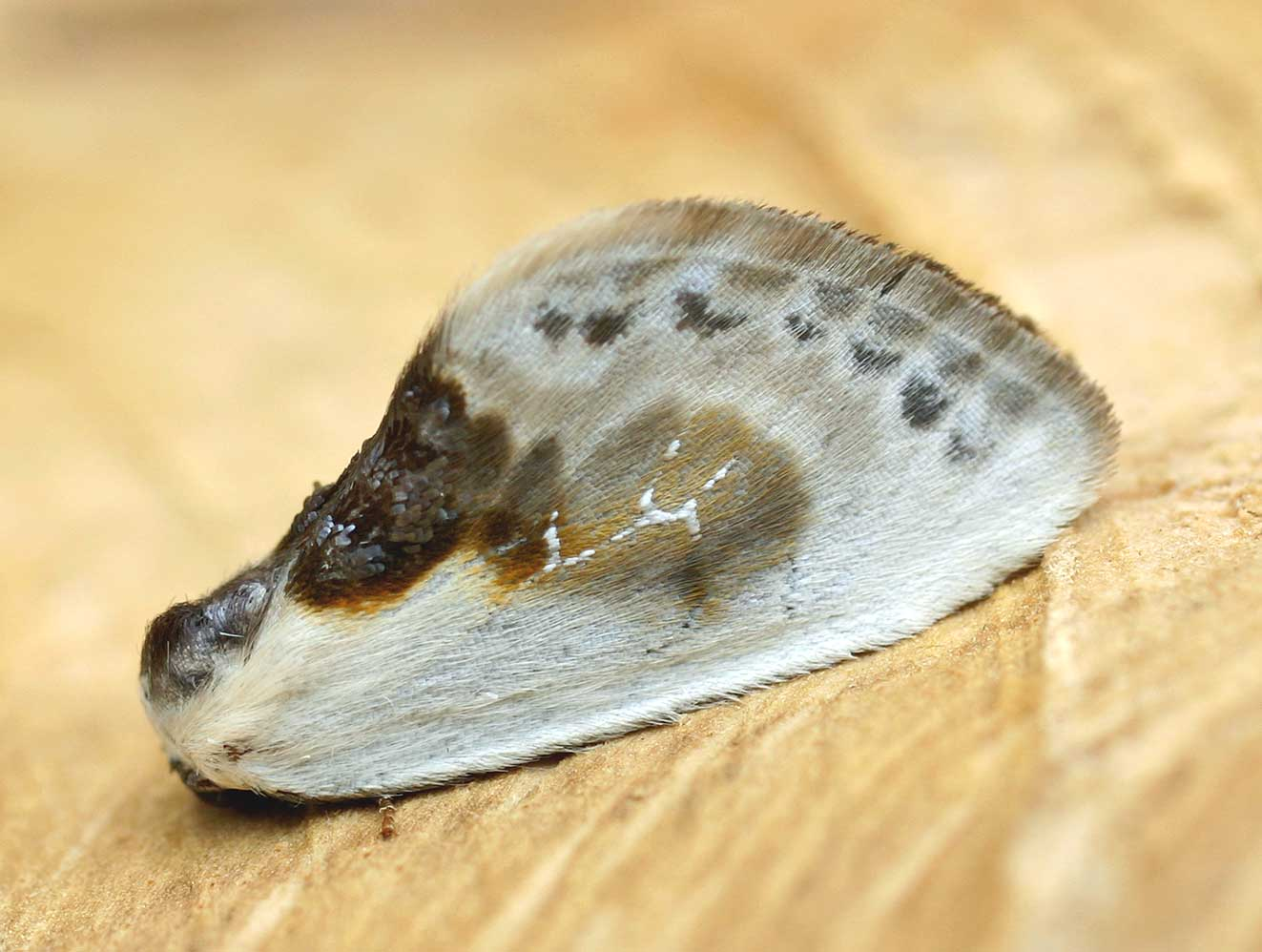

Scientific classification
- Kingdom: Animalia
- Phylum: Arthropoda
- Clade: Pancrustacea
- Class: Insecta
- Order: Lepidoptera
- Family: Drepanidae
- Genus: Cilix
- Species: C. glaucata

Binomial name
- Cilix glaucata (Scopoli, 1763)

Synonyms
- List: Phalaena glaucata Scopoli, 1763; Attacus ruffa Linnaeus, 1767; Bombyces spinula Denis & Schiffermüller, 1775; Bombyx compressa Fabricius, [1777]; Phalaena modesta Walch, 1779; Cilix glaucata var. aeruginata Turati, 1907; Cilix angelina Dannehl, 1925

= Cilix glaucata =

Chinese character

Species of hook-tip moth

Cilix glaucata, the Chinese character, is a moth of the family Drepanidae. It was first described by the Italian physician and naturalist, Giovanni Antonio Scopoli in his 1763 Entomologia Carniolica. It is found in Europe, Asia Minor and North Africa.

== Description ==
The wingspan is 18–22 mm. The moth flies from April to August depending on the location. Cilix glaucata lives on sunny and warm forest edges, slopes and hedges, on bushy dry grasslands and heaths, but also in parks.

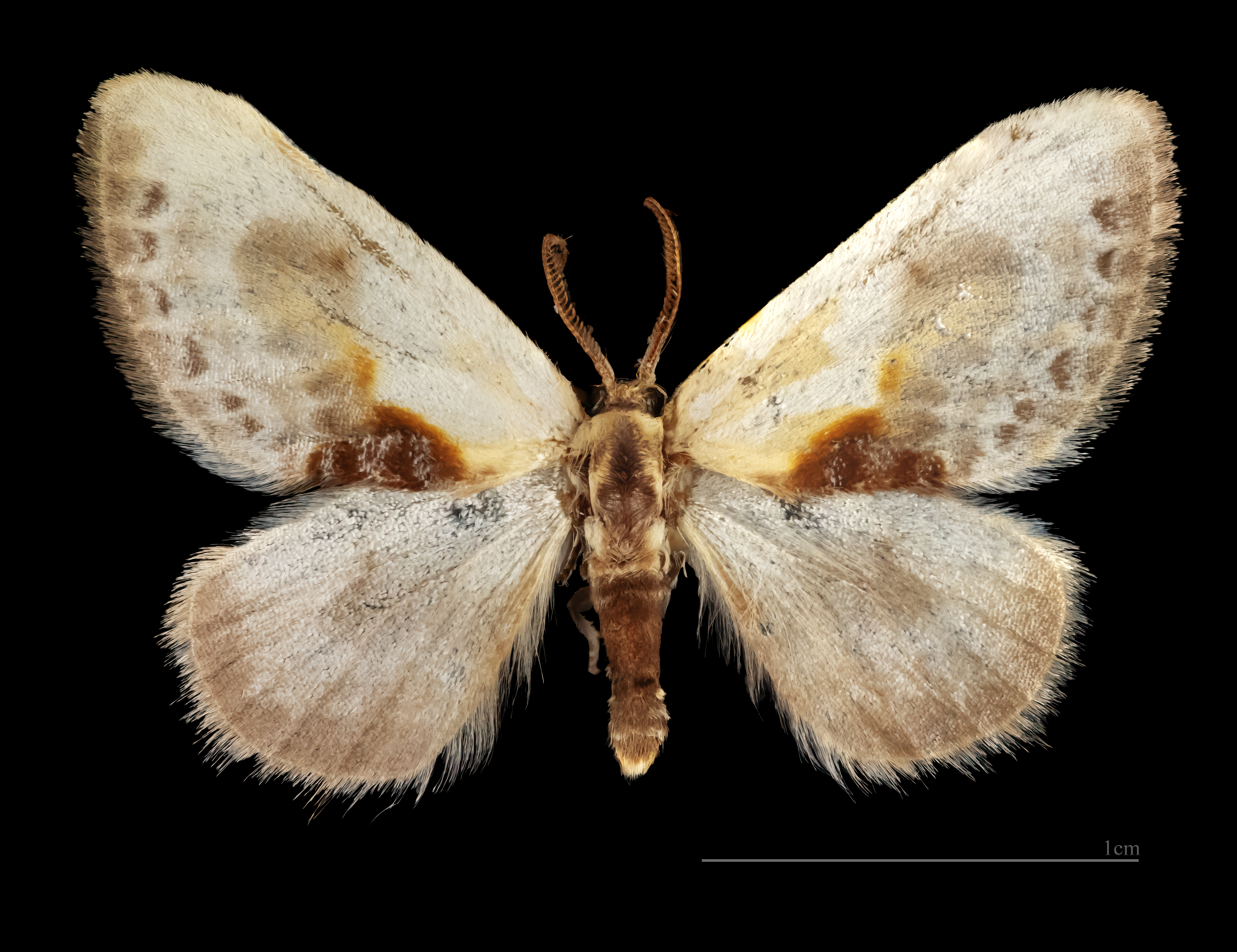
♂

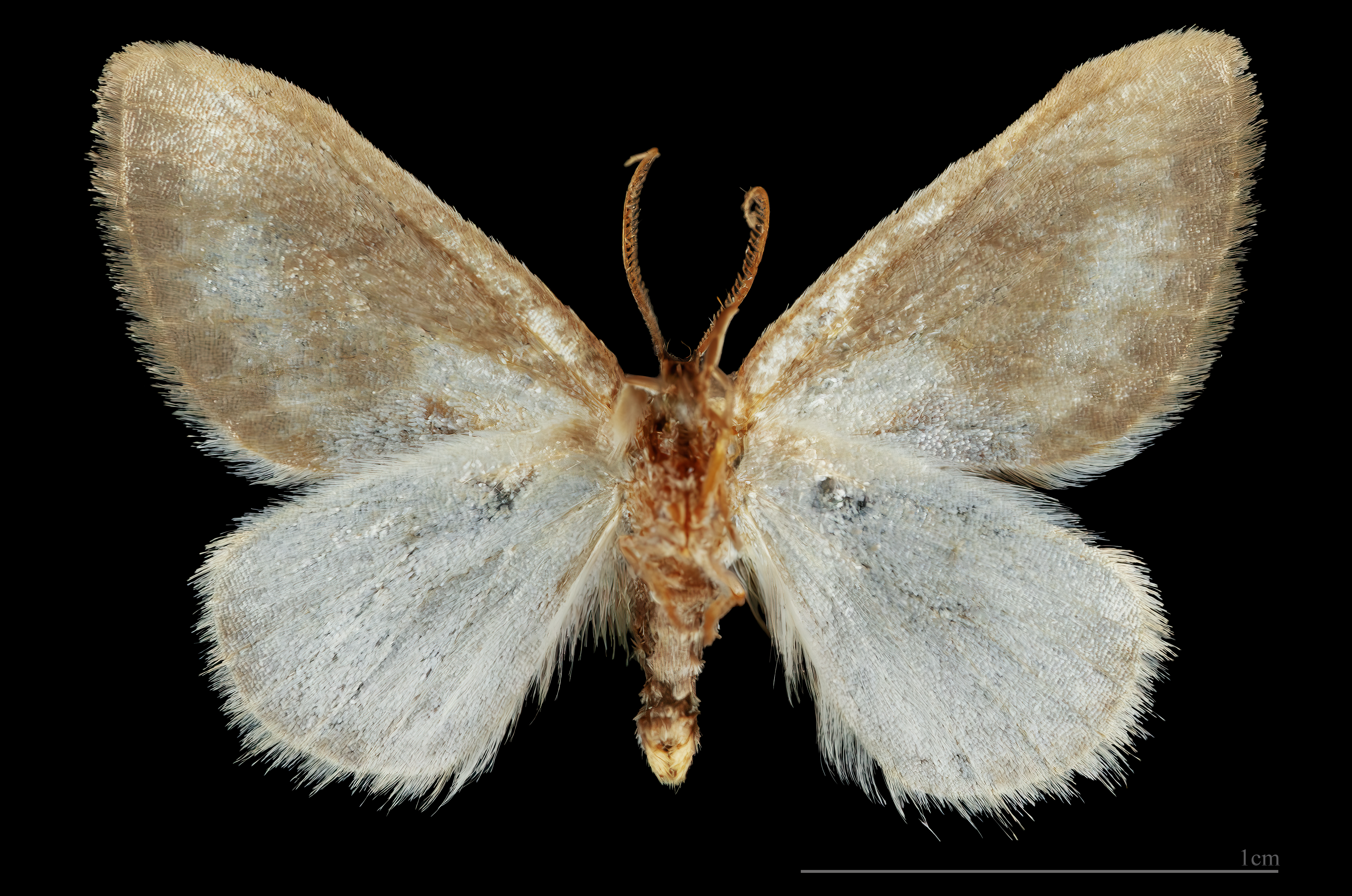
△ ♂

The moth has porcelain-white wings, with a series of small grey spots along the outside edge of the front wing and the inner edge has a large dark brown stain, which turns yellow and grey towards the middle of the wing. Occasionally there are silvery scales. The wingtips are rounded and not curved. If they are sitting in their resting position, they imitate bird droppings. The antennae are only slightly combed.

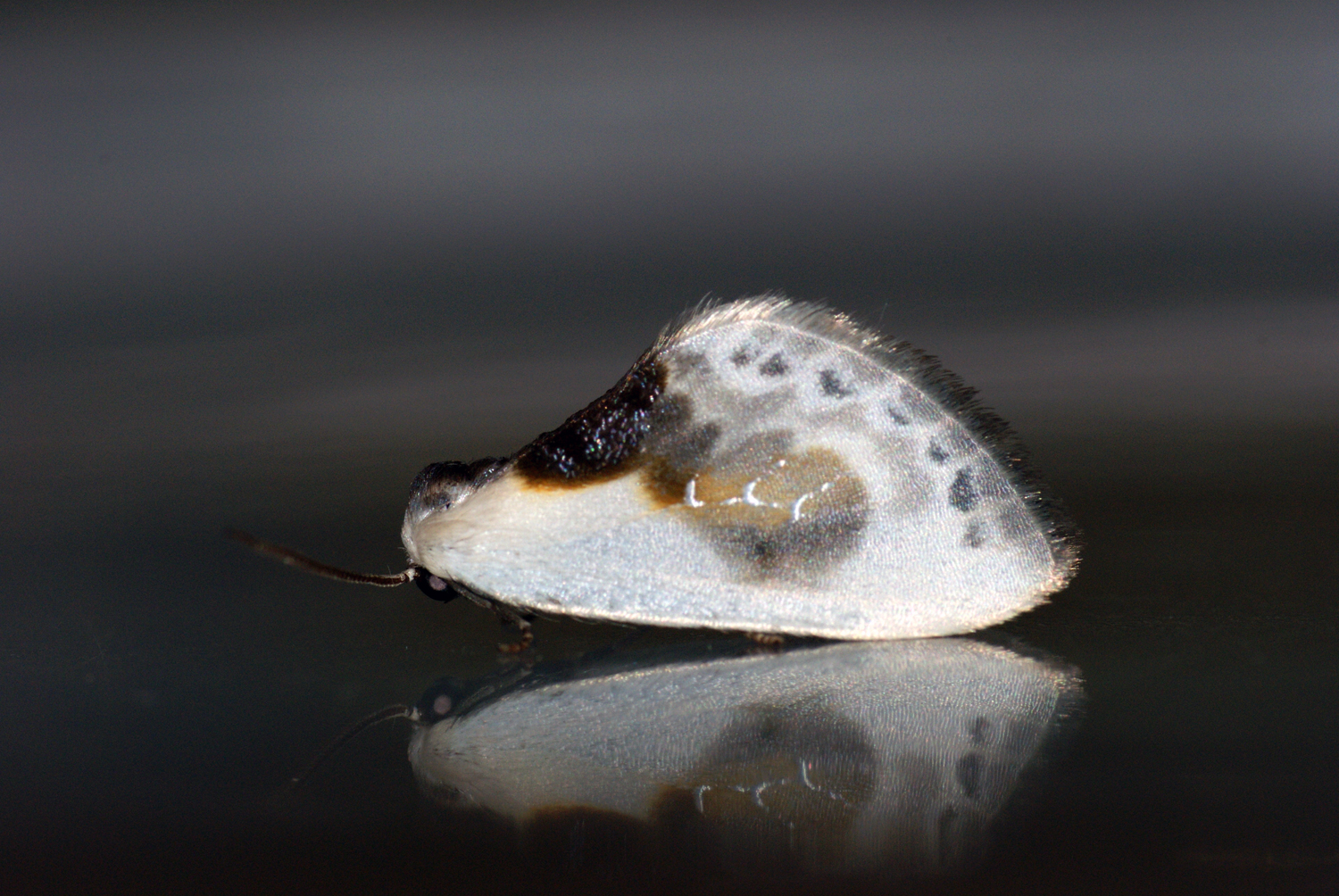
On this Cilix glaucata moth's wing, the silvery scales may — by pareidolia — look a bit like the Chinese character 山 (radical 46), meaning "mountain".

The silvery scales at the middle of the wings are sometimes said to look like a small letter. Some variations may look like Chinese characters, hence the name.

Larva

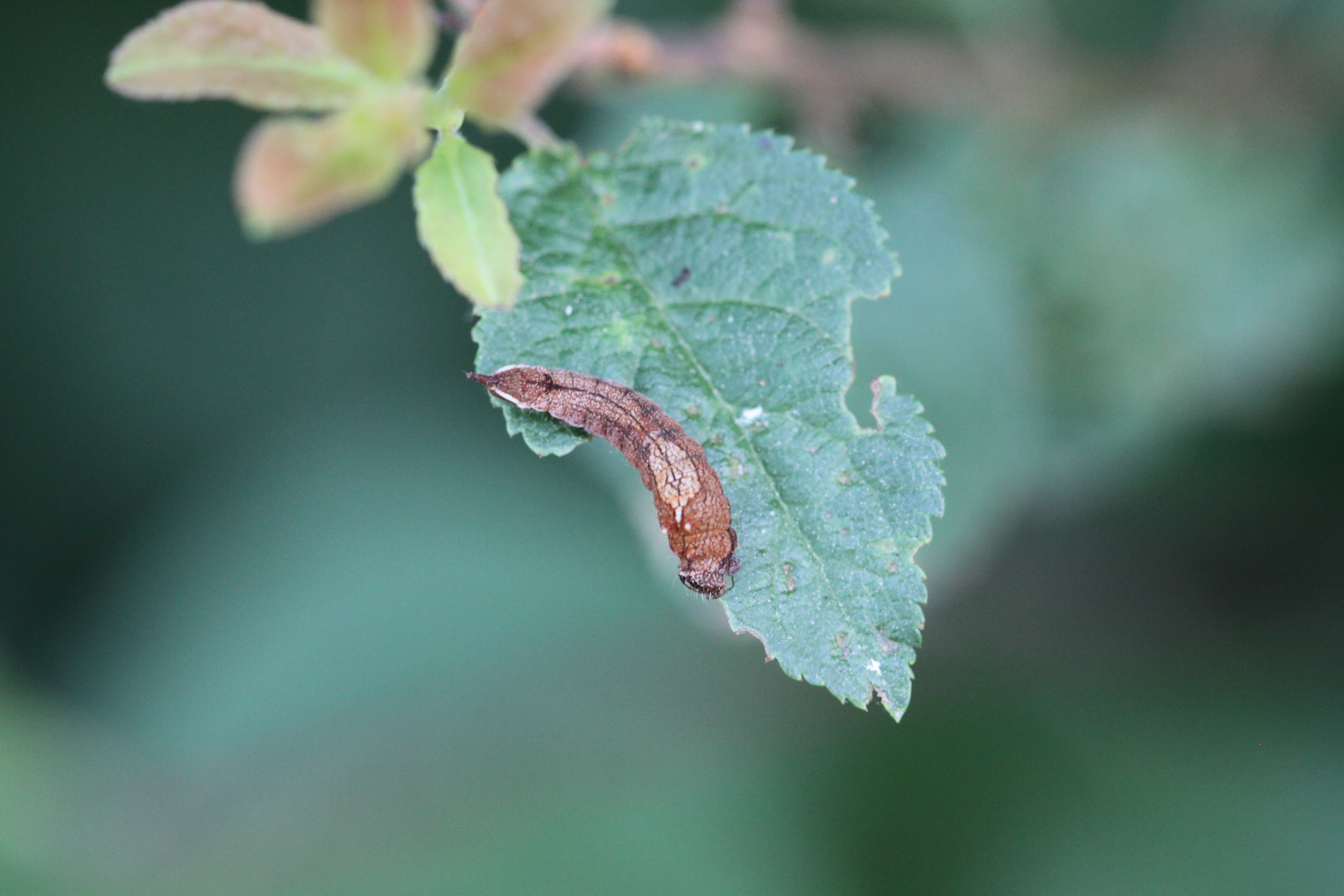

The caterpillars become about 12 millimeters long and are dark brown. The thorax is clearly thickened and the end of the abdomen is extended to a narrow tip. The larvae feed on bramble (Rubus species), hawthorn (Crataegus species) and cherry (Prunus species).

== Similar species ==
- Cilix hispanica Pérez De-Gregorio, Torruella, Miret, Casas & Figueras, 2002. Spain, Southern France, Corsica, Southern Italy, Algeria
- Cilix algirica Leraut, 2006. Morocco, Algeria, Portugal, presumably also in Spain
- Cilix asiatica Bang-Haas, 1907. Turkey to Iran
