= 127th Motor Rifle Division (Russia) =

Russian Ground Forces formation

2nd Collective Farm Rifle Division (1932–1936) 66th Rifle Division (1936–1946) 2nd Tank Division (1946–1957) 32nd Tank Division (1957–1965) 66th Tank Division (1965–1974) 277th Motor Rifle Division (1974–1990) 127th Machine Gun Artillery Division (1990–2009) 59th Motor Rifle Brigade (2009–2018) 127th Motor Rifle Division (2018–present)
- Great emblem of the 127th Motor Rifle Division
- Active: 1932–present (as 127th MRD)
- Country: USSR (until 1991); Russia
- Branch: Soviet Army (until 1991); Russian Ground Forces
- Type: Mechanized infantry
- Size: Division
- Part of: 5th Combined Arms Army
- Garrison/HQ: Sergeyevka, Primorsky Krai
- Engagements: World War II; Soviet invasion of Manchuria; Russo-Ukrainian War; 2023 Ukrainian counteroffensive
- Decorations: Order of Kutuzov 2nd Class

The 127th Order of Kutuzov Motor Rifle Division (Russian: 127-я мотострелковая дивизия) is a division of the Russian Ground Forces. It was reformed from the 59th Separate and 70th Separate Guards Motor Rifle Brigades in 2018, and was the 127th Machine-Gun Artillery Division (127 пулемётно-артиллерийская дивизия) from 1990 to 2009. The division traces its history to the 66th Rifle Division of World War II.

== Formation and World War II ==
The division was originally formed on 14 May 1932 in village of Lutkovka-Medveditskoye in the Shmakovsky raion of the Ussuriisk Oblast, Far Eastern Military District, as the 2nd Collective Farm Division. It was renamed the 66th Rifle Division on 21 May 1936.

The division formed part of the 35th Army of the Maritime Group of Forces in the Far East in May 1945. In August 1945 the division, as a part of 1st Far East Front, participated in the Soviet invasion of Manchuria. On 9 August 1945 the division began operations as part of 35th Army, advancing 12 kilometers, having forced the Songacha River in northern Heilongjiang. The division fought on the Ussuri River at Khotunsky (Хотунского), Mishan, Border (Пограничного), and Duninsky (Дунинского) fortified districts, capturing the cities of Mishan, Jilin, Jantszy, and Harbin. For its valour in combat and courage, the 66th Rifle Division was awarded the Order of Kutuzov, Second Degree, on 19 September 1945. Three Hero of the Soviet Union medals, 1266 awards, and 2838 medals were given to the division's personnel.

== Postwar ==
On 29 November 1945 it was reorganised as the 2nd Tank Division, but was renamed again in 1957 as the 32nd Tank Division and in 1965 as the 66th Tank Division. On 30 March 1970 the division became the 277th Motor Rifle Division.

In May 1981 the division headquarters was relocated to Sergeyevka. On 1 June 1990 the 277th Motor Rifle Division was reorganised as the 127th Machine Gun Artillery Division. The 702nd Motor Rifle Regiment was disbanded and replaced by the 114th Machine-Gun Artillery Regiment. It incorporated the 114th and 130th Machine Gun Artillery Regiments, the 314th Motor Rifle Regiment, 218th Tank Regiment, 872nd Artillery Regiment, and 1172nd Anti-Aircraft Rocket Regiment.

In mid-2008 the division, under a new commander, Sergey Ryzhkov, replaced some of its former cadre units with higher-readiness units. A regiment arrived from Sergeevka and two regiments of constant readiness from Kamen-Rybolov (438th Motor Rifle Regiment?) on the western shore of Khanka Lake, and Ussuriysk (the 231st Motor Rifle Regiment). These changes effectively made the division a motor rifle formation though its designation was still that of a static defence formation.

In 2009, as part of the Russian Ground Forces' transition to brigades, the division appears to have been reorganised as the 59th Separate Motor Rifle Brigade at Sergeevka from the main body of the division, equipped with BMPs, and the 60th Motor Rifle Brigade [Separate] at Lipovtsy, Primorsky Krai from the 218th Tank Regiment of the division, also equipped with BMPs.

On March 20, 2026, by decree of the President of the Russian Federation, the division was promoted to a guards unit.

== Reform and structure ==
According to a Krasnaya Zvezda article, the division was reformed by 1 December 2018 from the 59th Motor Rifle Brigade and began combat training in March 2019. The division now has the Military Unit Number (V/Ch, в/ч) 44980.

Key bodies of the division now include:

- Staff and headquarters at Sergeevka in Pogranichny District, Primorsky Krai (Military Unit Number 44980);
- 114th Guards Motor Rifle Regiment (ru:114-й гвардейский мотострелковый полк), V/Ch 24776, formed from the 70th Separate Guards Motor Rifle Brigade, located at Ussuriysk;
- 394th Red Banner Motor Rifle Regiment at Sergeevka, V/Ch 25573;
- 218th Tank Regiment, V/Ch 82588, Lipovtsy, Primorskiy Krai;
- 872nd Self-Propelled Vitebsk-Khingan Order of Aleksandr Nevsky Artillery Regiment, V/Ch 75234;
- 1171st Anti-Aircraft Rocket Regiment at Ussuriysk, V/Ch 65484.

The division was committed to action during the Russian invasion of Ukraine.

== Gallery ==
127th Motorized Rifle Division's T-72B & T-72B mod.1989 firing at the Sergeyevsky Training Ground (08-04-2020)

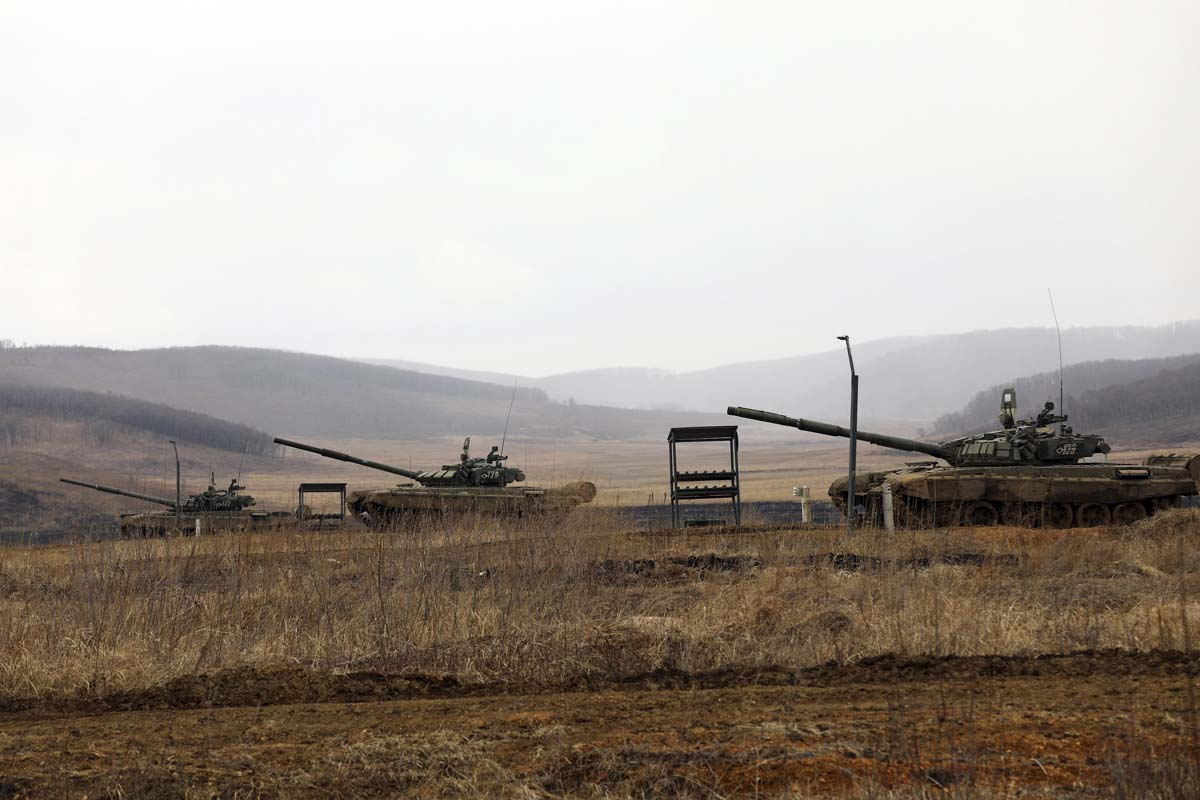

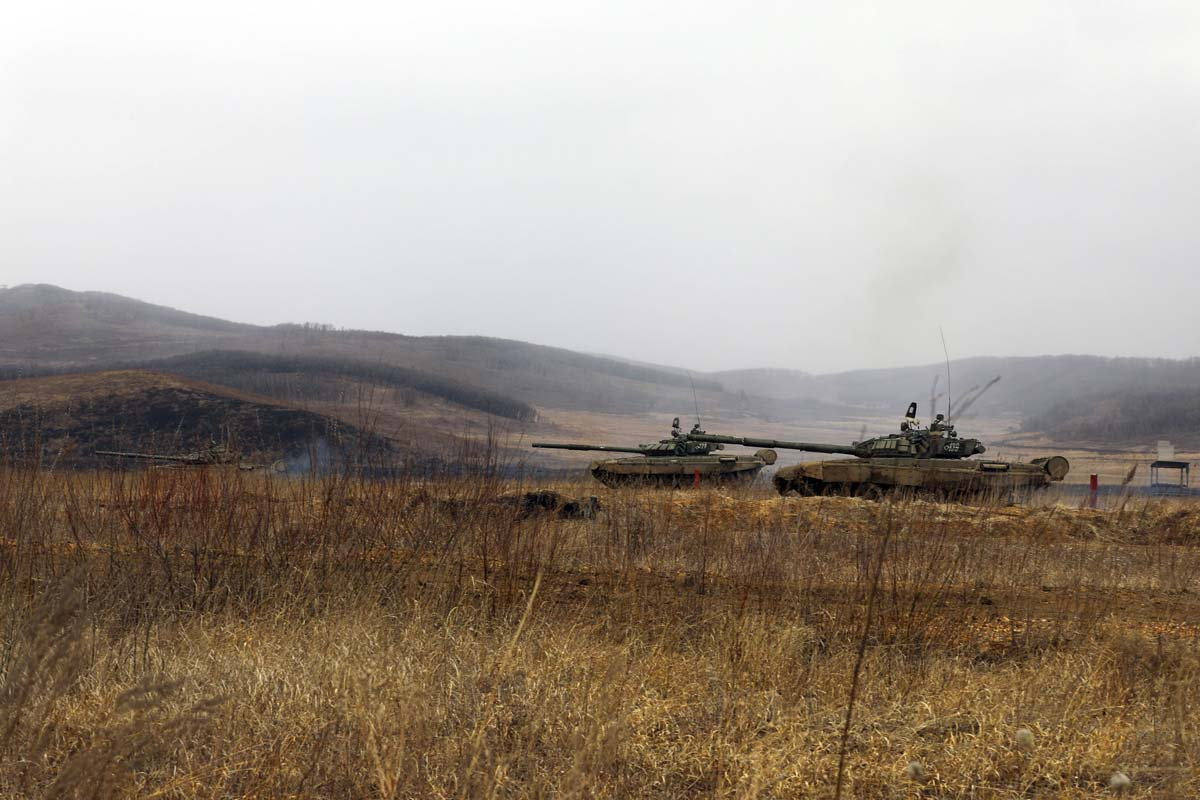

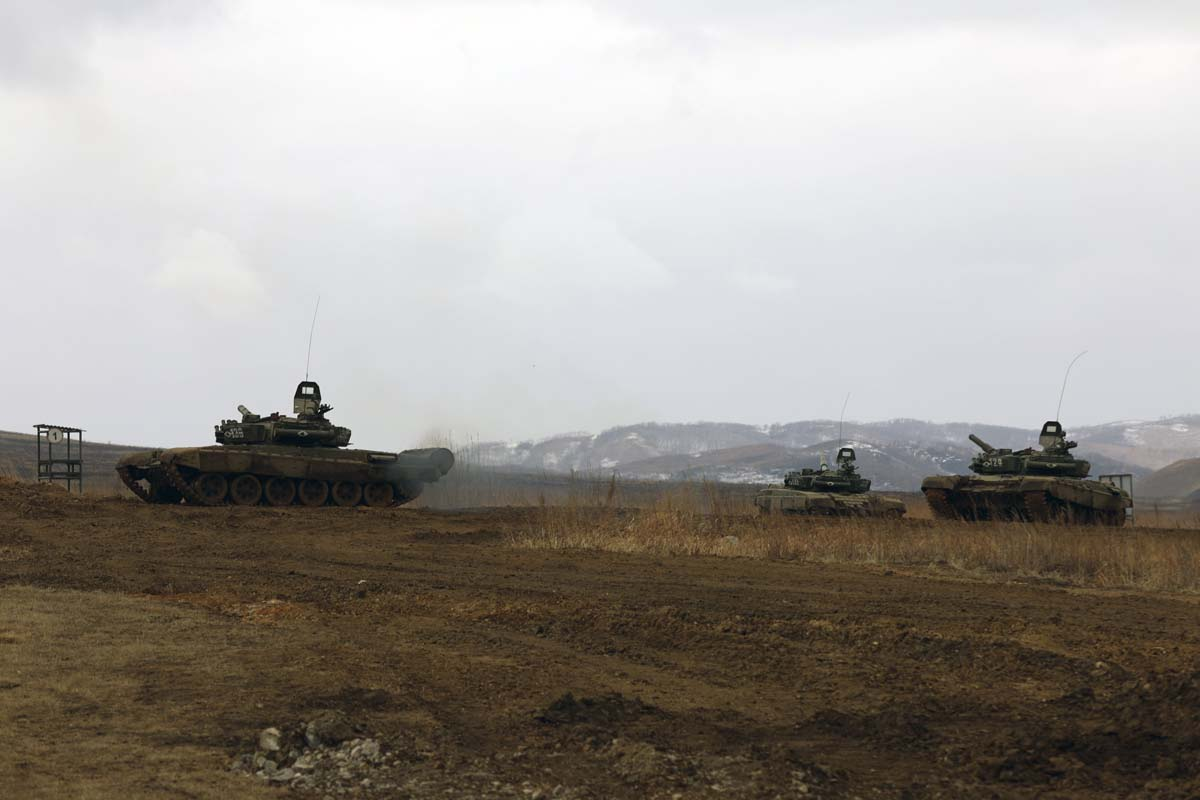

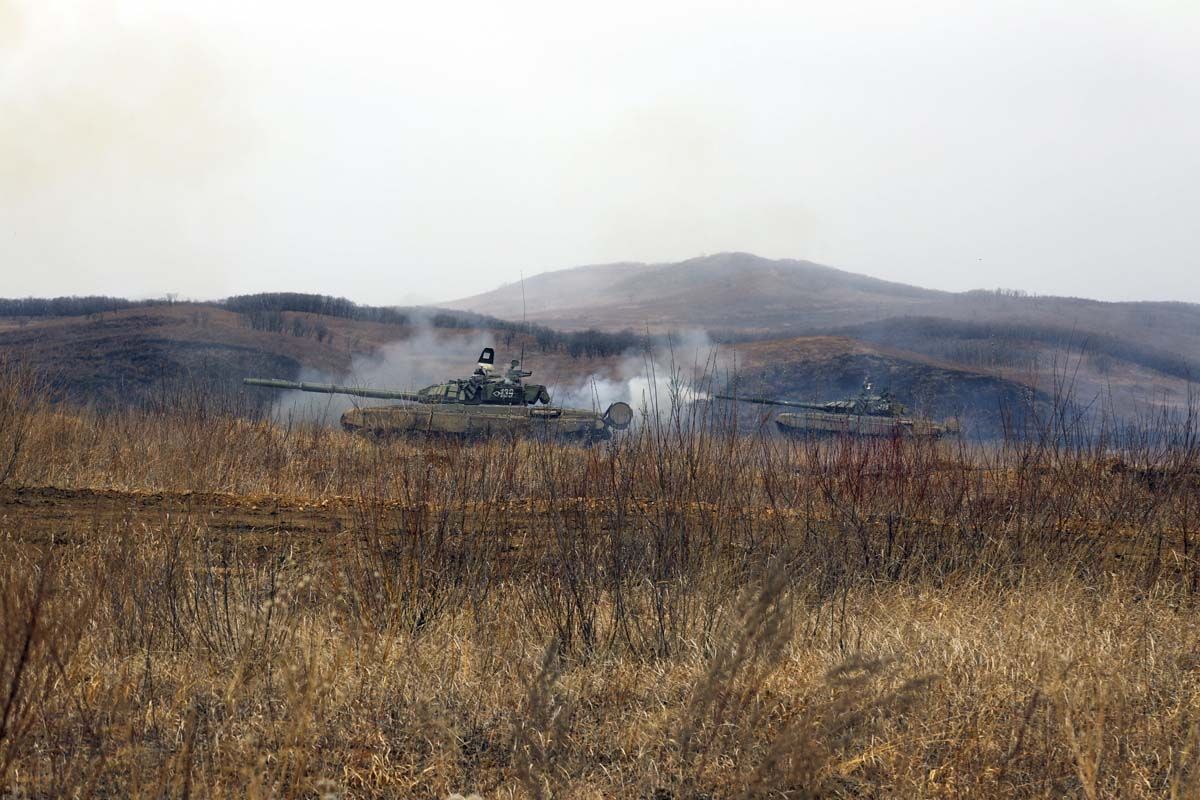

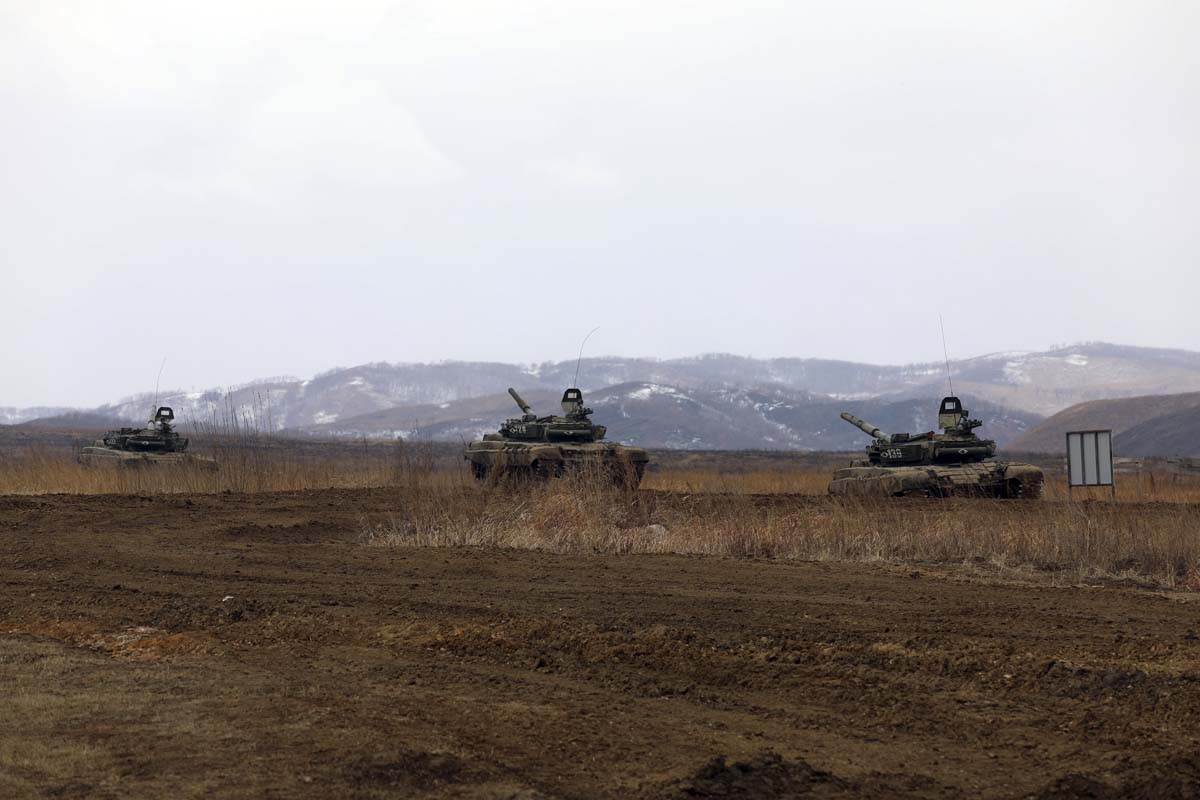

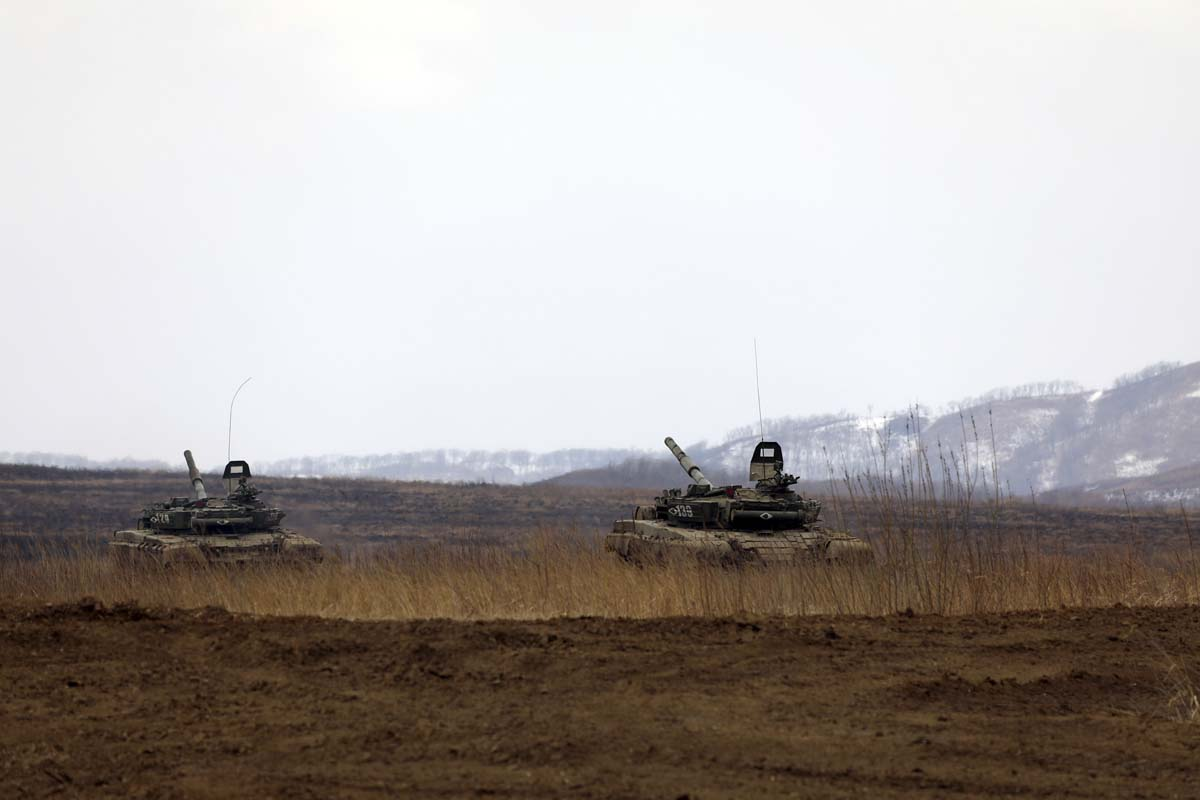

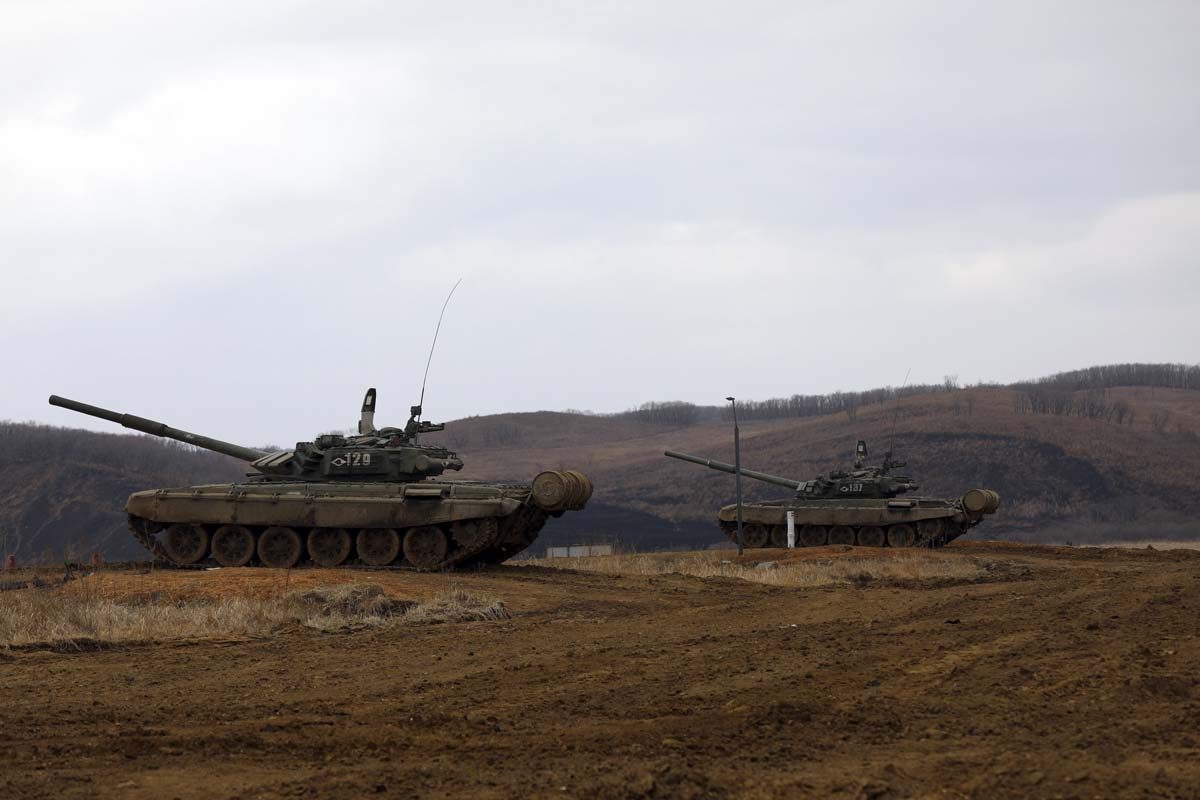

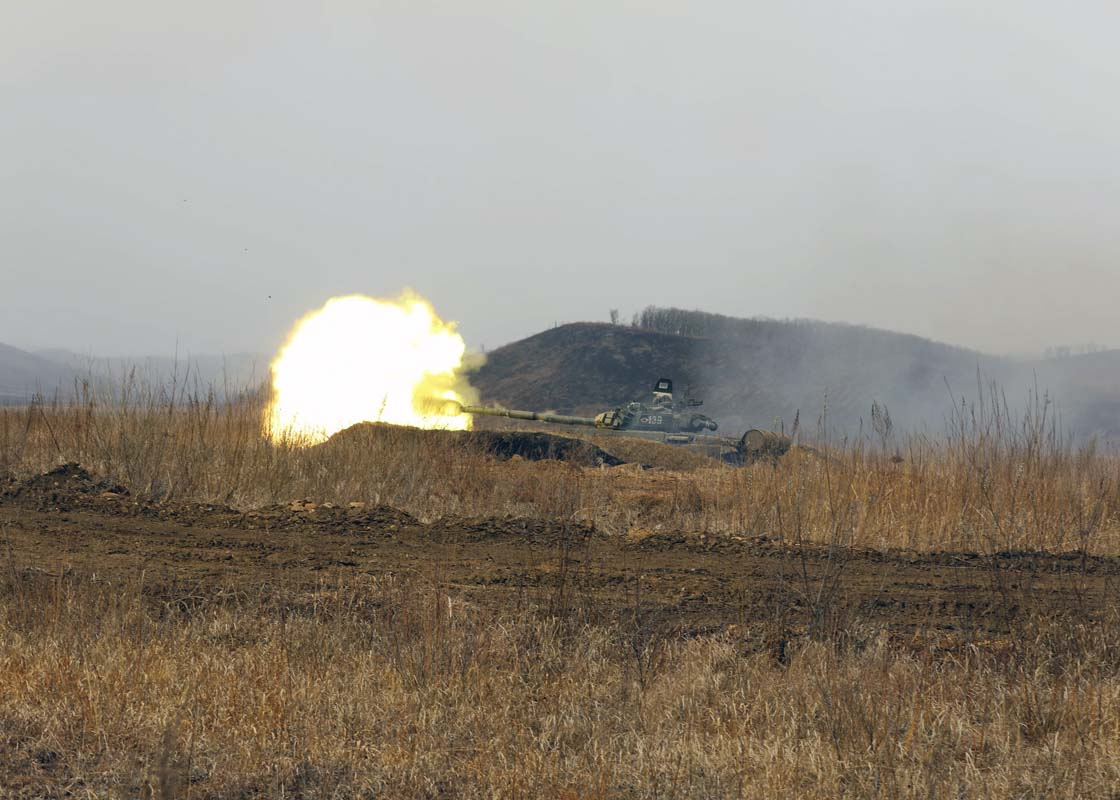

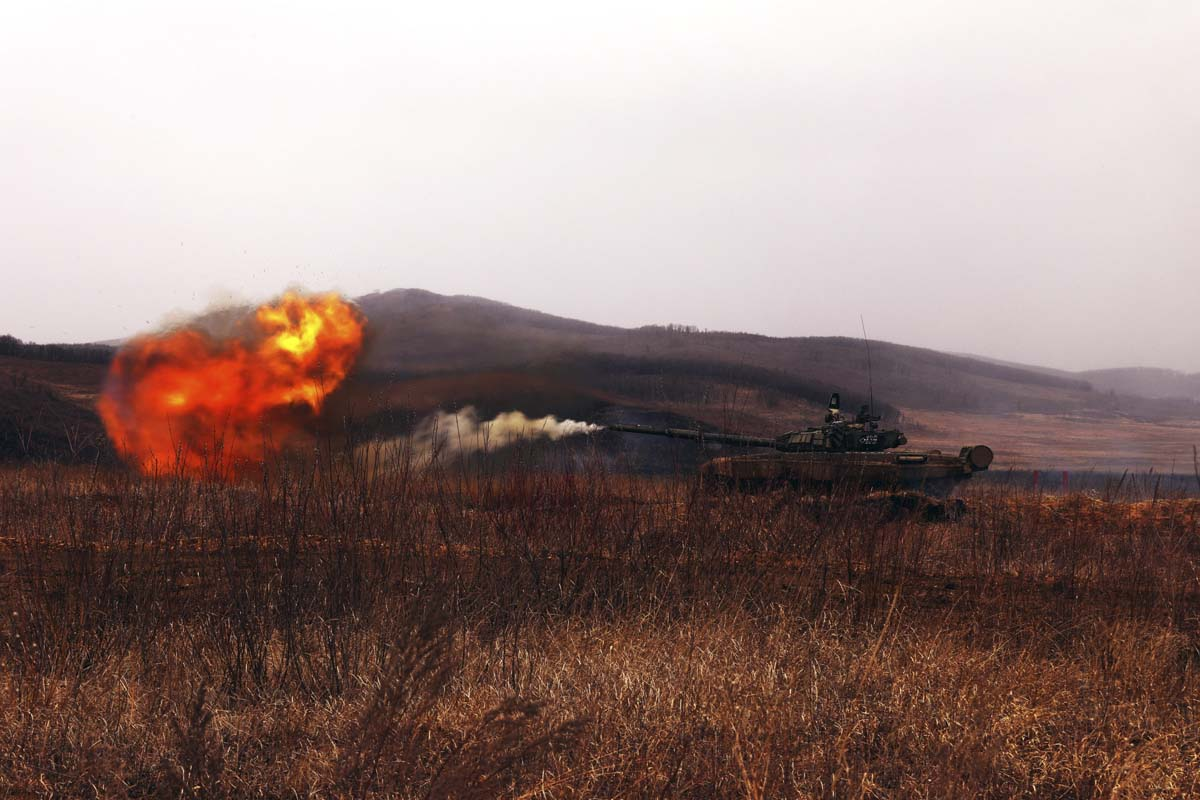

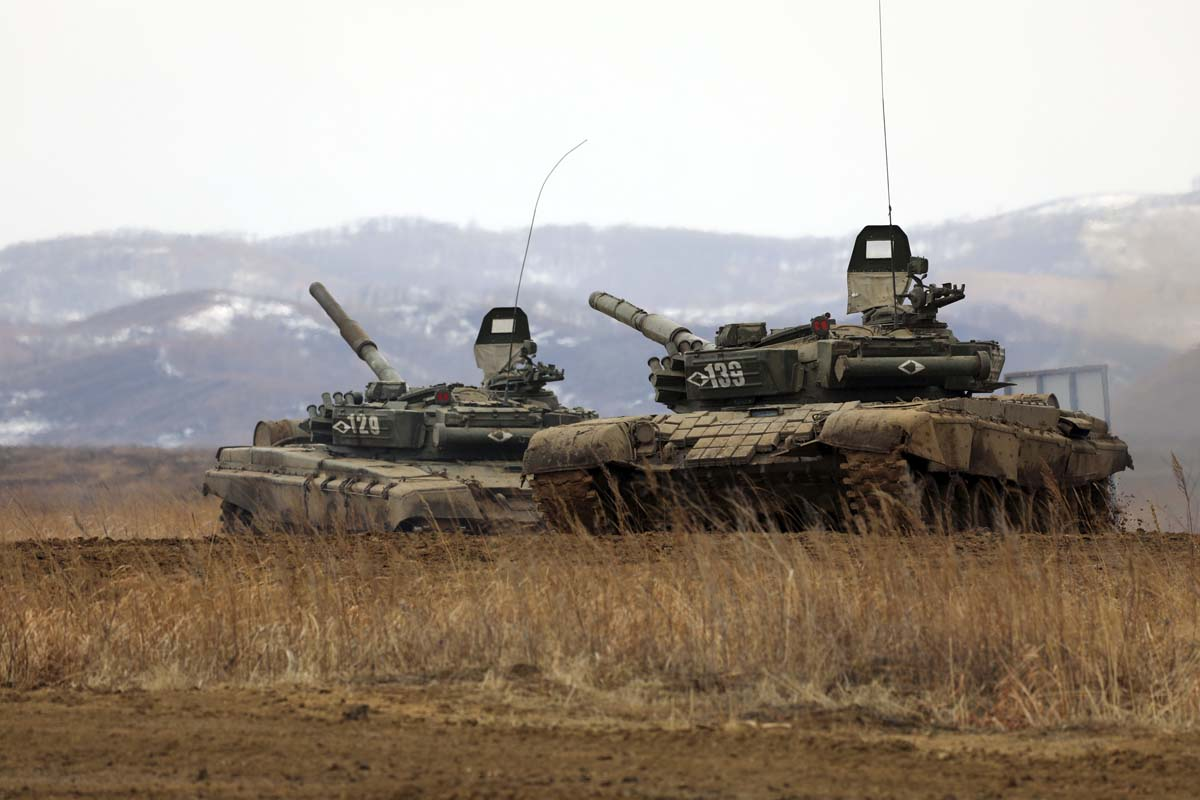

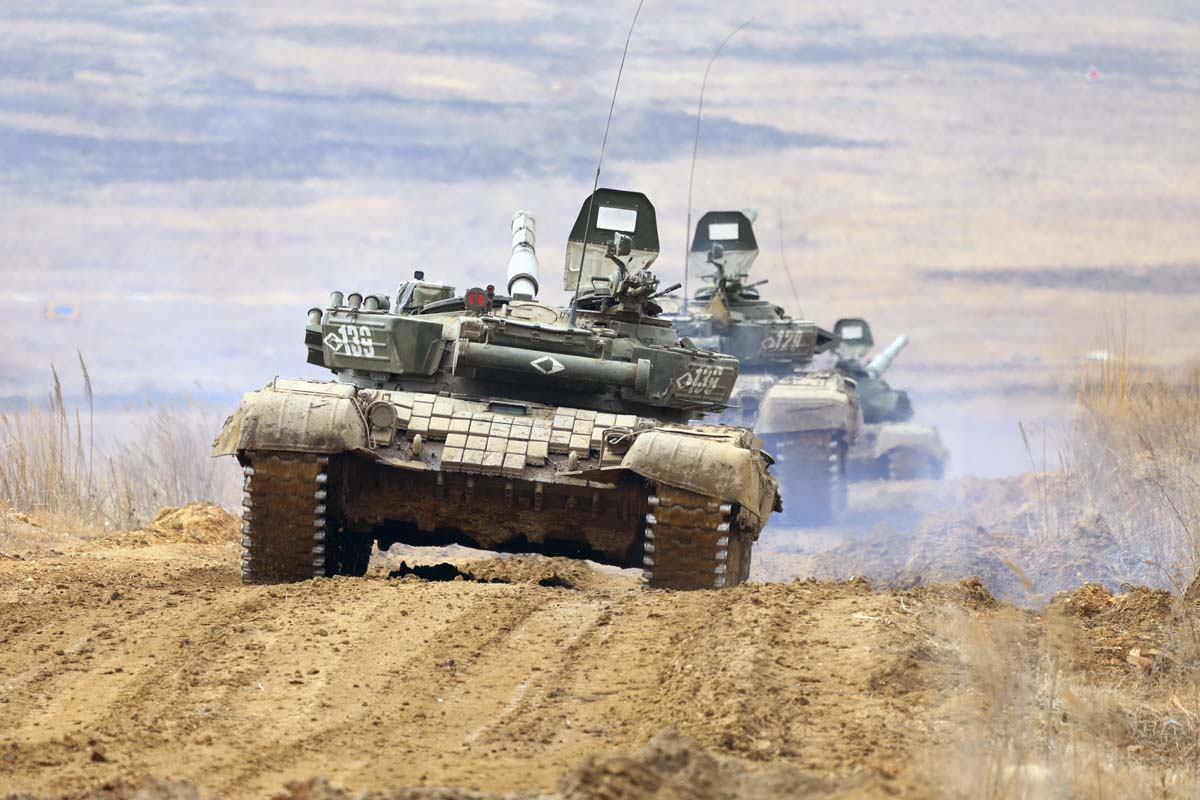

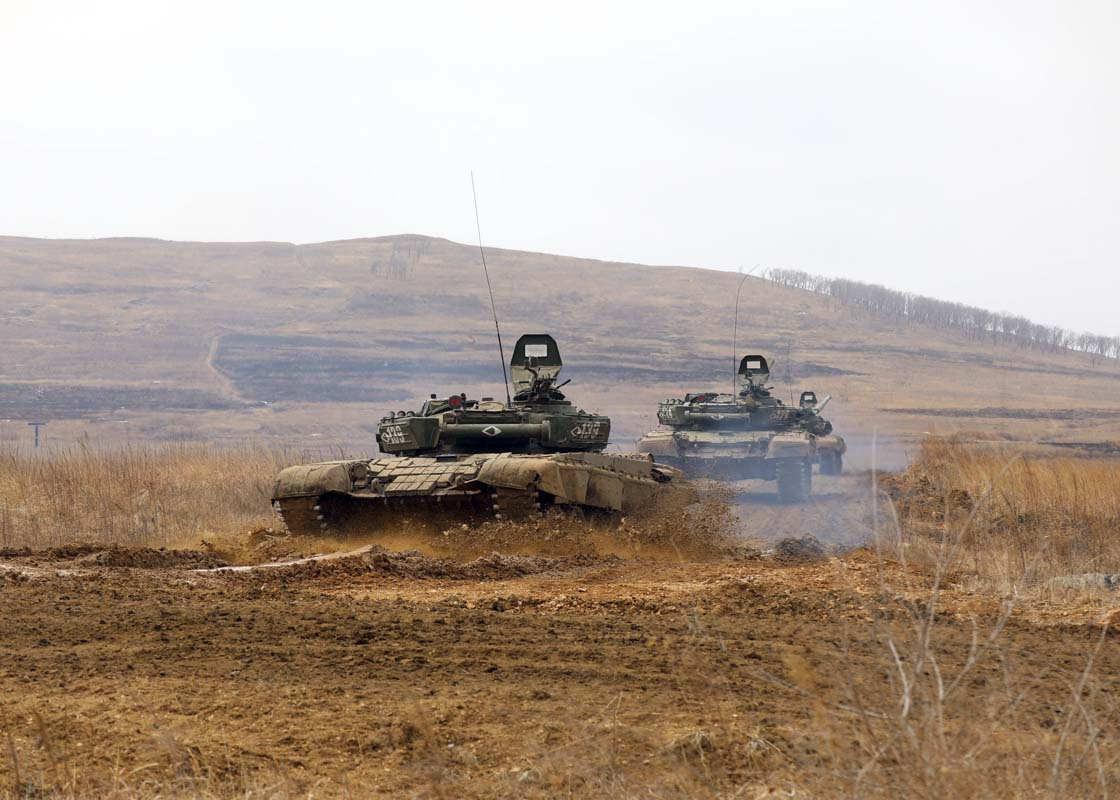

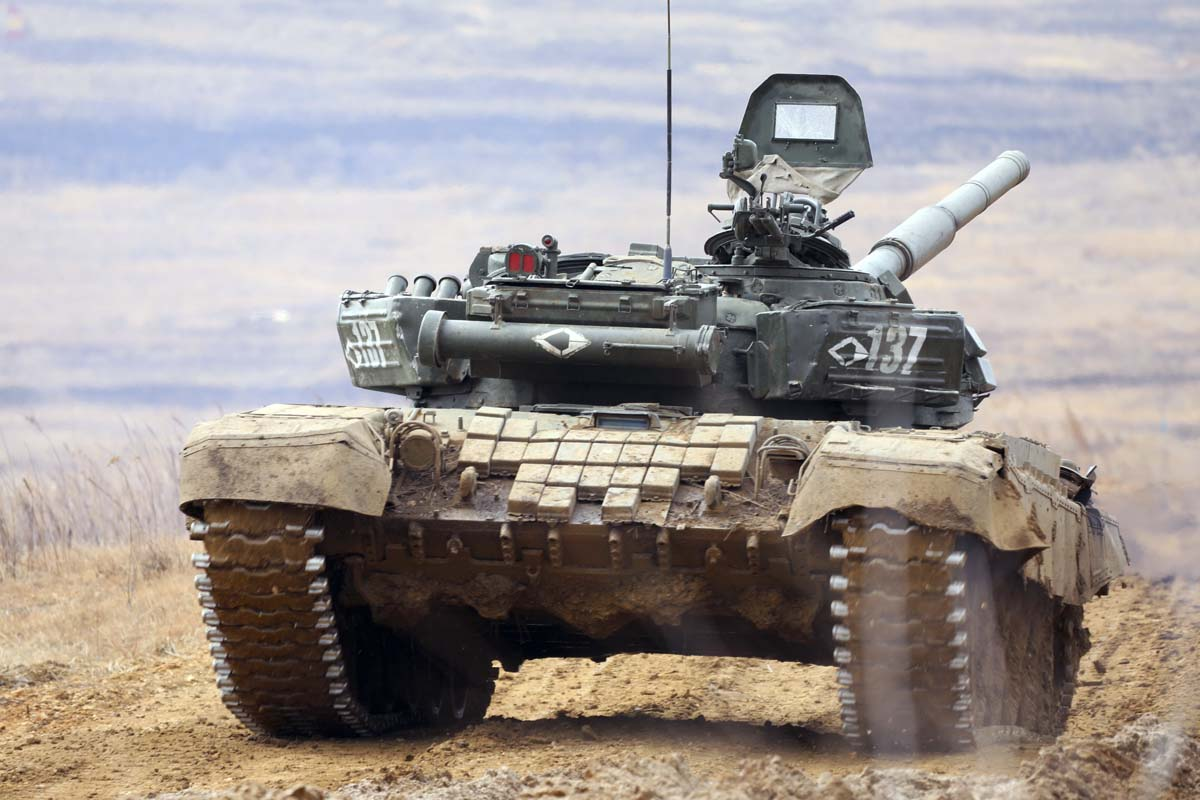
