= Hanka =

Hanka may be diminutive of the given name Hannah or its variants in various languages, as well as a surname. Notable people with the name include:

== Given name ==
- Hanka Bielicka (1915–2006), Polish singer and actress
- Hanka Durante (born 1976), German volleyball player
- Hanka G, Slovak singer
- Hanka Grothendieck (1900–1957), German writer, teacher and anarchist activist
- Hanka Kliese (born 1980), German politician
- Hanka Kupfernagel (born 1974), German cyclist
- Hanka Mittelstädt (born 1987), German politician
- Hanka Ordonówna (1902–1950), Polish singer, dancer and actress
- Hanka Paldum (born 1956), Bosnian singer
- Kali, also known as Hanka Weynerowski (1918–1998), Polish-born American painter

== Surname ==
- Angela Hanka (1891–1963), Austrian figure skater
- Václav Hanka (1791–1861), Czech philologist

== See also ==
- Khanka (disambiguation)
