= Khanka (disambiguation) =

Lake Khanka is a freshwater lake located on the border between Primorsky Krai, Russia and Heilongjiang province, China

- Khanka gudgeon (Squalidus chankaensis), a species of fish in the Cyprinidae family
- Khanka spiny bitterling (Acanthorhodeus chankaensis), a species of fish in the Cyprinidae family
- Suiphun–Khanka meadows and forest meadows, an ecoregion in Russia and China
- Khanka Nature Reserve, Russia

Khanka may also refer to:

- Eslamabad-e Darvish Khanka, a village in Kerman Province, Iran
- Xonqa (a.k.a. Khanka, anglicisation of Russian Ханка), a town in Khorazm Region, Uzbekistan
  - Xonqa District (Khanka District)
- Khanke, a village in Kurdistan region, Iraq
- Khanka, a city in Qalyubiyya Governorate, Egypt
- khanqah, a type of building

== See also ==
- Hanka (disambiguation)
- Kanka (disambiguation)
