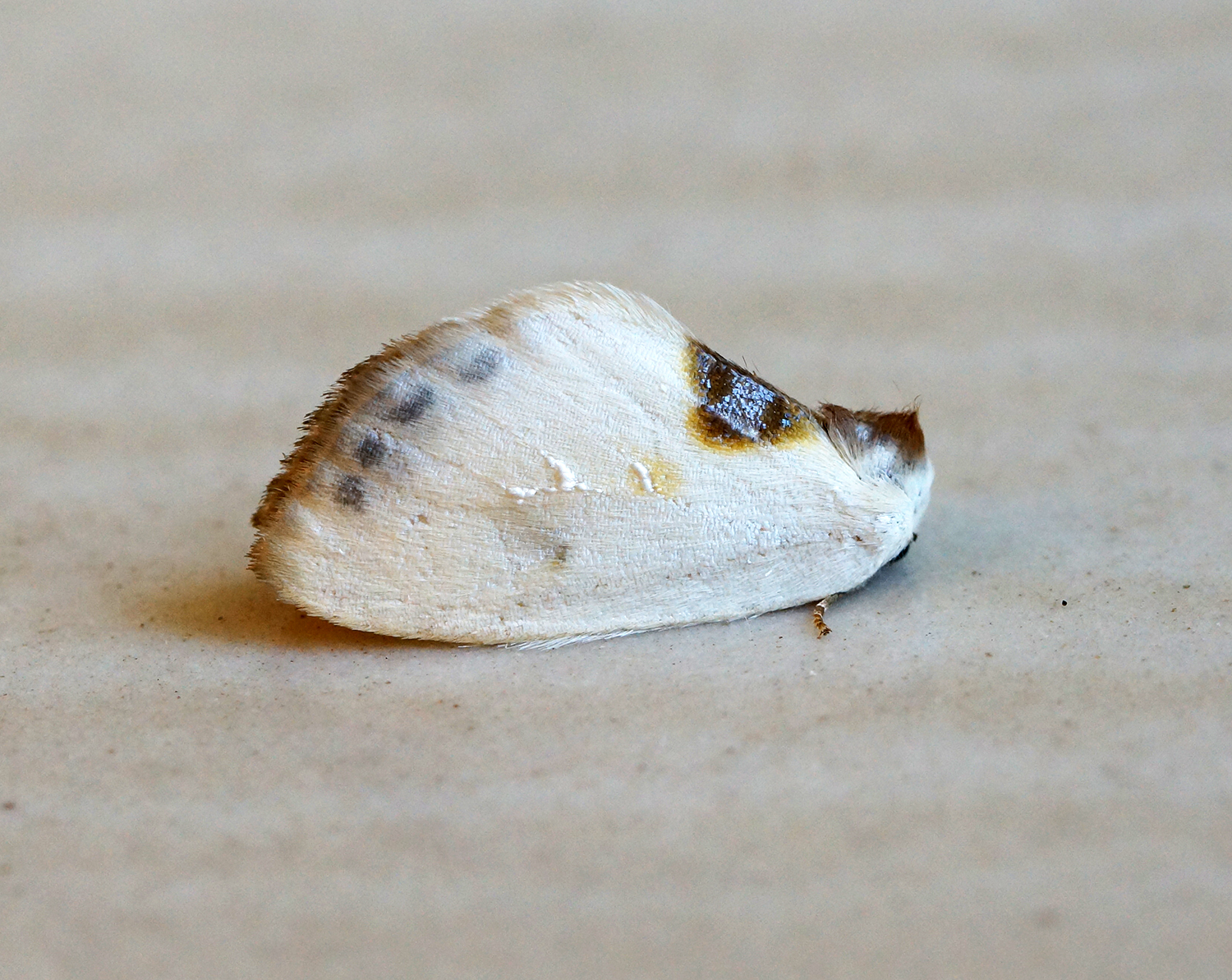
- Cilix asiatica

Scientific classification
- Domain: Eukaryota
- Kingdom: Animalia
- Phylum: Arthropoda
- Class: Insecta
- Order: Lepidoptera
- Family: Drepanidae
- Genus: Cilix
- Species: C. asiatica

Binomial name
- Cilix asiatica O. Bang-Haas, 1907

Synonyms
- Cilix glaucata var. asiatica A. Bang-Haas, 1907

= Cilix asiatica =

Species of hook-tip moth

Cilix asiatica is a species of moth in the family Drepanidae first described by Otto Bang-Haas in 1907. It is found in Ukraine, Romania, Bulgaria, North Macedonia, Greece (including Crete), the eastern parts of Turkey, Israel and Lebanon. The habitat consists of xerothermic woodland.

Adults are on wing from mid-April to early October. There are two to three generations per year.

The larvae are polyphagous on a variety of Rosaceae species, including Jasminum and Rubus tomentosus, Prunus, Crataegus and Malus species. Larvae can be found from May to the end of October.

== Taxonomy ==
Cilix depalpata was previously treated as a synonym of Cilix asiatica, but was reinstated as a valid species in 2006.
