= Kanka =

Kanka may refer to:

- Kanka, Uzbekistan, an ancient settlement
- Kanka (name), given name and surname
- Kank-A, a liquid pharmaceutical product used primarily to treat canker sores

== See also ==
- Khanka (disambiguation)
