= Khanka Nature Reserve =

Nature reserve in Primorsky Krai, Russia

- Russian: Ханкайский заповедник (Also: Khankaisky)
- IUCN category Ia (strict nature reserve)
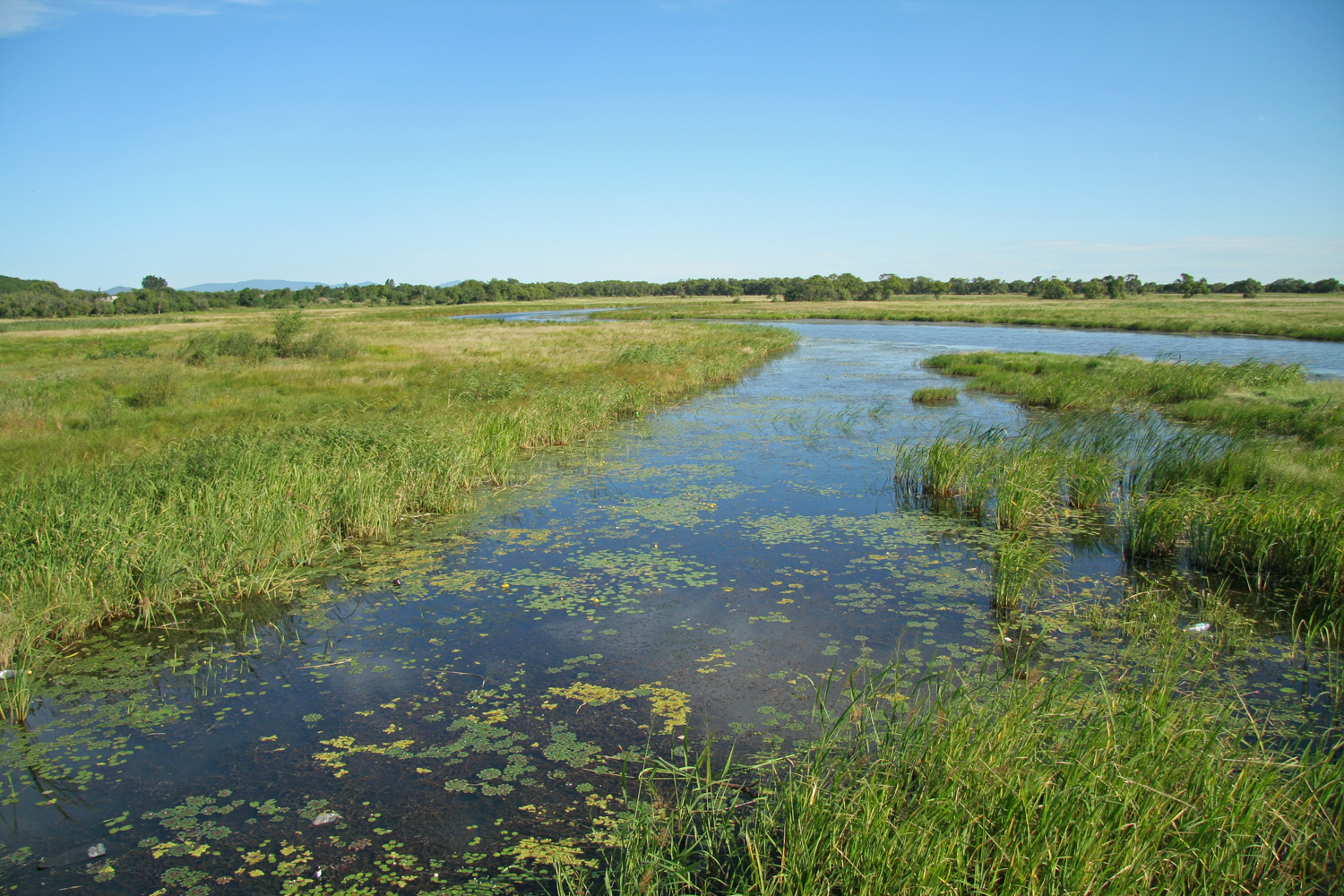
- Marshland leading in Lake Khanka

- Location within Russia
- Location: Primorsky Krai
- Nearest city: Spassk-Dalny
- Coordinates: 45°0′0″N 132°9′0″E
- Area: 43,679 hectares (107,933 acres; 169 sq mi)
- Established: 1990
- Governing body: Ministry of Natural Resources and Environment (Russia)
- Website: http://www.khanka-lake.ru/

Ramsar Wetland
- Official name: Lake Khanka
- Designated: 11 October 1976
- Reference no.: 112

Khanka Nature Reserve (Russian: Ханкайский заповедник Khankaiskiy zapavyednik) (also Khankaisky) is a Russian 'zapovednik' (strict nature reserve) that covers portions of the shore and waters of Lake Khanka, the largest freshwater lake in the Russian Far East. It is an important area for nesting and migrating waterfowl and other birds. The reserve is divided into five distinct sectors on the southern and eastern shores of the lake. The reserve is situated in the Spassky District, in the southwest of Primorsky Krai. It was formally established in 1990, and covers an area of 437 km^{2} (169 sq mi). It is part of a UNESCO Biosphere Reserve.

== Topography ==
The southern two-thirds of Khanka is in Russia; the northern third is in China. The total surface area of the lake is 4,190 km2. The Khanka Reserve is split into five sections that cover parts of the southern shore, the eastern shore, and a spur that extends from the northeast of the lake. The terrain around the lake is mostly flat and lacustrine-alluvial, with rolling hills off the lake; the highest point is 147 meters. The five sections are:

- River - (12,494 ha)
- Crane - (9,479 ha)
- Devil's swamp - (16,641 ha)
- Pine - (375 ha)
- Melgunovsky - (300 ha)

Around the lake are bogs underlain by a thick layer of clay. Because water cannot sink through the clay, the plains around the lake are frequently waterlogged. There are 9 rivers than feed into the lake, but only one, the Songacha River, that flows out. The Songacha is a tributary of the Ussuri River, and ultimately the Amur River to the north.

== Climate and ecoregion ==
Khanka is located in the Suiphun-Khanka meadows and forest meadows ecoregion, a forest-less area around Lake Khanka in the Russian Far East, on the Upper Ussuri River, and along the Suiphun River to the south. This ecoregion is characterized by fire tolerant meadows and Mongolian oak woodland, with high levels of species diversity and endemism.

The climate of Khanka is Humid continental climate, warm summer (Köppen climate classification (Dfb)). This climate is characterized by large swings in temperature, both diurnally and seasonally, with mild summers and cold, snowy winters. The maximum monthly mean temperature is 20 °C (68 °F) in July, while the minimum monthly mean temperature is −21 °C (−6 °F) in January. Rainfall mainly occurs in summer, with average annual precipitation of 500–650 mm annually.

== Flora and fauna ==
The reserve covers many different floral habitats - meadow, swamp, steppe, lacustrine, and forest. About 30% of the meadows are reed grass. The steppe-type areas are grasslands at the feet of the ridges, with characteristic species being bent grass, wild onion, and horsetail. Average height of vegetation in these areas is 20–40 cm. Inland of the eastern shore of the lake are widespread peat bogs. The marshes, usually dominated locally by one type of reed grasses, are valued by the waterfowl for food and shelter. Aquatic vegetation is diverse. In the shallow bays are thickets of pondweed, with floating patches of lilies and other surface cover. Shallow areas feature arrowhead, knotweed, and bloodroot, while all shores feature reeds, grasses, and wild rice. There is one forest on the site, of Mongolian oak and associated plants. Scientists on the reserve have recorded 685 species of vascular plants.

The animal life of the reserve is most notable for birds: 337 species have been recorded, and 140 species are known to breed on the site. Characteristic mammals are raccoon dog and fox, and nine species of mice. The fish of the lake include catfish, pike, and various species of carp.

== Ecoeducation and access ==
As a strict nature reserve, the Khanka Reserve itself is mostly closed to the general public, although scientists and those with 'environmental education' purposes can make arrangements with park management for visits. There are, however, buffer zones along the lakes that are open from low-impact tourism and leisure use. Also, there are 'ecotourist' routes with bird observation towers for seasonal use by the public, but use requires permits to be obtained in advance and group size and numbers are limited. The main office is in the city of Spassk-Dalny.

== See also ==
- List of Russian Nature Reserves (class 1a 'zapovedniks')
- National Parks of Russia
