= Ondrej Krajňák =

Slovak musician

Ondrej Krajňák (born 1 March 1978) is a Slovak musician.

== Early life ==
Krajňák was born on 1 March 1978, in Levice, Czechoslovakia. He came from a musical family. At six, he was already playing classical music and participating in various competitions for young talents. At age ten he heard jazz for the first time. Krajňák became so fascinated by this new form of music that, in the same year, he participated in a young jazz artist competition – Jazz Fest Zilina, where he was awarded the 'Discovery of the year'.

When Krajňák was 14, he began to study at the Erkel Ferenc Jazz Academy in Budapest (HUN) under Robert Ratonyi. During this period he participated in various musical competitions in Europe, such as a jazz contest in Poland, where he won a special award, and a piano contest in Hungary, where he was awarded best artist in the category "solo piano". After graduation he obtained a scholarship at the Berklee College of Music in Boston, which he rejected to start his active career.

== Career ==
Krajňák established himself on the European jazz scene. He has recorded over 40 albums and performed at concerts all over the world.

== Selected musical collaborations ==
- Elements duo with Radovan Tariška
- One with Oto Hejnic Trio
- Standards (One) with Oto Hejnic Trio
- Forevernest solo piano album
- Radovan Tariska Sextet
- Partnership Unlimited with Oskar Rózsa
- What´s outside with Štveráček Quartet
- Jazz at Prague Castle with Ondřej Štveráček
- When I Fall in Love with Olga Škrancová
- Reflections of My Soul with Hanka G
- Essence with Hanka G
- Aven Bachtale with Ida Kelarová
- Sumen Savore with Ida Kelarová
- Ethno Fest with Ida Kelarová
- Ida Kelarová and Iva Bittová sings Jazz
- Marija Panna Precista with Zuzana Lapčíková
- Orbis Pictus with Zuzana Lapčíková
- Rozchody, Navraty with Zuzana Lapčíková
- Slovak Jazz Trio with Jozef Šošoka
- Three Pianos with Ľubomír Šrámek and Klaudius Kováč
- Hot House with Juraj Bartoš
