= Hanka (disambiguation) =

Hanka is a given name or a surname.

Hanka may also refer to

- Hanka (film), 1955 Yugoslav film
- Hanka Island, Antarctica
- Hanka Homestead, or the Hanka Homestead Finnish Museum, Michigan, U.S.

== See also ==
- Khanka (disambiguation)
