= Cilix filipjevi =

Scientific classification
- Domain: Eukaryota
- Kingdom: Animalia
- Phylum: Arthropoda
- Class: Insecta
- Order: Lepidoptera
- Family: Drepanidae
- Genus: Cilix
- Species: C. filipjevi

Binomial name
- Cilix filipjevi Kardakoff, 1928

Synonyms
- Cilix glaucata filipjevi Kardakoff, 1928

Species of hook-tip moth

Cilix filipjevi is a moth in the family Drepanidae first described by Nikolai Ivanovich Kardakoff in 1928. It is found in the Russian Far East (Ussuri), Korea, north-eastern China and Japan.

== Subspecies ==
- Cilix filipjevi filipjevi (Russia: Ussuri, Korea, north-eastern China: Manchuria)
- Cilix filipjevi malivora Inoue, 1958 (Japan)
