= Suiphun–Khanka meadows and forest meadows =

Ecoregion mostly in the Russian Far East

Coordinates: 45.25°N 132.75°E

Suiphun-Khanka meadows and forest meadows
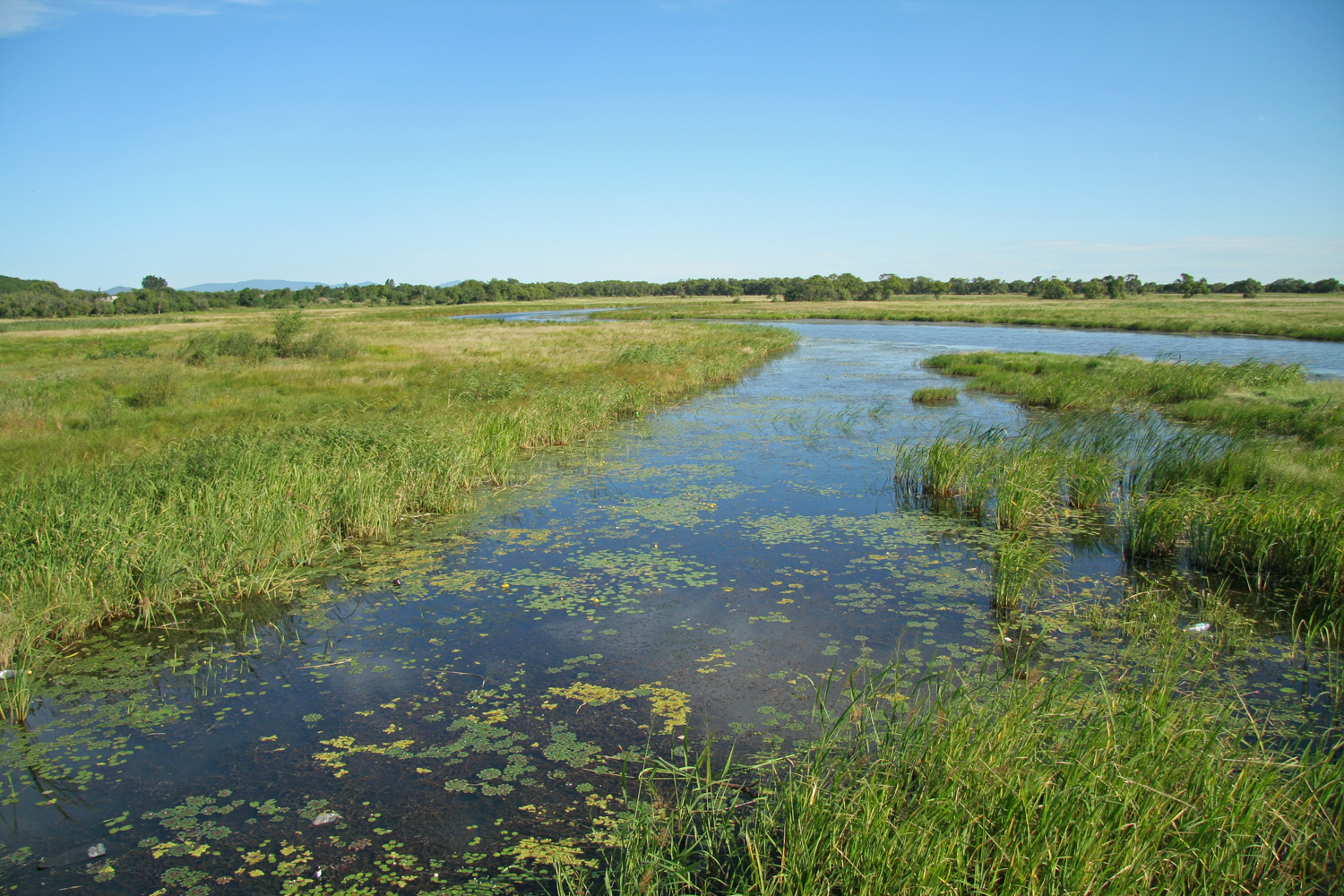
- Marsh leading into Lake Khanka

- Ecoregion territory (in purple)

Ecology
- Realm: Palearctic
- Biome: Flooded grasslands and savannas

Geography
- Area: 33,929 km^{2} (13,100 sq mi)
- Countries: China, Russia

The Suiphun–Khanka meadows and forest meadows ecoregion (WWF ID: PA0907) (also: Ussuri-Wusuli meadow and forest meadow) is a relatively small ecoregion centered on Lake Khanka, a fresh water lake in the Russian Far East, with a portion in China. The terrain is unforested, flat, and marshy. The area is an important stopover spot for migratory birds, including many vulnerable species. It has an area of 33,929 square kilometres (13,100 sq mi), and is in the Flooded grasslands and savannas biome.

== Location and description ==
The headwaters of the Ussuri River cross the northern edge of the ecoregion, Lake Khanka dominates the middle, and the Suifen River (Razdolnaya River in Russian) feeds the lake from the south. The lake straddles the border between Heilongjiang Province in China to the west, and Primorsky Krai in Russia to the east. The only outflow from Lake Khanka is the Songacha River, a tributary of the Ussuri, and eventually the Amur River. The entire area is known as the Khanka Depression, as it is a lowland surrounded by mountains and higher ground. The ecoregion is surrounded by the Manchurian mixed forests on the north, west, and south, and the Ussuri broadleaf and mixed forests on the east.

== Climate ==
The region has a Humid continental climate - cool summer subtype (Koppen classification Dwb). This climate is characterized by high variation in temperature, both daily and seasonally; with long, cold winters and short, cool summers with no averaging over 22 °C (72 °F). Mean precipitation is about 600 mm/year. The mean temperature at the center of the ecoregion is −20 °C (−4 °F) in January, and 20 °C (68 °F) in July.

== Flora and fauna ==
Much of the surrounding area is a mire type of wetland: characterized by living, peat-forming plants. The most common forms of mire are wet meadows and grass bogs. Underlying the area is a thick layer of clay that prevents drainage through the soil. Species diversity is high due to the favorable conditions; Endemism is high because the area was not glaciated in the Pleistocene, creating in the area both a refuge and a migratory route for species.

As the largest freshwater lake in the Russian Far East, Lake Khanka is an important nesting and migratory spot for bird - most importantly the waterfowl that use the area for nesting, staging, and feeding. 49 species of waterfowl have been recorded including 24 species of ducks, 9 of geese, 5 of divers, and 5 of others. During the spring flyover, populations of up to 500,000 geese have been recorded; duck populations also reach into the hundreds of thousands. Over 361 species of birds have been noted in the ecoregion.

Four species of crane are found in the ecoregion, including the endangered Red-crowned crane (Manchurian crane).

== Protections ==
Significant protected areas in the ecoregion include:

- Khanka Nature Reserve, a Russian strict nature reserve on the southern shores and marshes of Lake Khanka.
- Xingkai Lake National Nature Reserve, covers 2,225 km2 of the northern floodplain and portion of Lake Khanka on the Chinese side. Managed in a transboundary agreement with Khanka Nature Reserve in Russia.
- Lake Khanka - Ramsar Wetland Site of International Importance.

== See also ==
- List of ecoregions in Russia
