= Cilix argenta =

Scientific classification
- Domain: Eukaryota
- Kingdom: Animalia
- Phylum: Arthropoda
- Class: Insecta
- Order: Lepidoptera
- Family: Drepanidae
- Genus: Cilix
- Species: C. argenta

Binomial name
- Cilix argenta Chu & Wang, 1987

Species of hook-tip moth

Cilix argenta is a moth in the family Drepanidae. It is found in China.
