= Naoli River =

River in Heilongjiang, China

Coordinates: 47°18′36″N 134°09′26″E

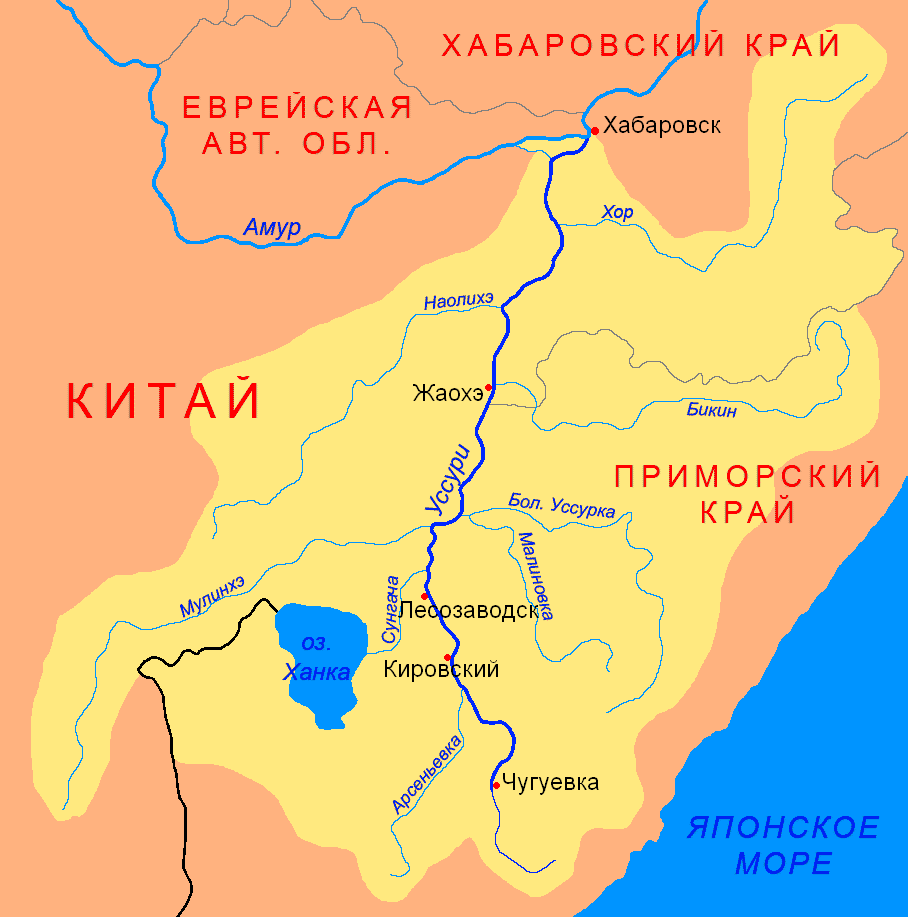
Naoli River

The 596-kilometre (370 mi) long Naoli (Chinese: 挠力河) River flows through Heilongjiang Province in northeast China and a left tributary of the river Ussuri. It is the longest tributary to the river Ussuri, located on the Sanjiang Plain.
