= Cilix tatsienluica =

Scientific classification
- Domain: Eukaryota
- Kingdom: Animalia
- Phylum: Arthropoda
- Class: Insecta
- Order: Lepidoptera
- Family: Drepanidae
- Genus: Cilix
- Species: C. tatsienluica

Binomial name
- Cilix tatsienluica Oberthür, 1916

Synonyms
- Cilix spinula tatsienluica Oberthür, 1916

Species of hook-tip moth

Cilix tatsienluica is a moth in the family Drepanidae first described by Oberthür in 1916. It is found in China (Sichuan, Hubei, Yunnan, Shansi, Shensi).

Adults can be distinguished from other species in the genus by the absence of a terminal fascia on the forewings, the poorly marked postmedial fascia (except at the apex) and the white fringe.
