= Cilix danieli =

Scientific classification
- Domain: Eukaryota
- Kingdom: Animalia
- Phylum: Arthropoda
- Class: Insecta
- Order: Lepidoptera
- Family: Drepanidae
- Genus: Cilix
- Species: C. danieli

Binomial name
- Cilix danieli Watson, 1968

Species of hook-tip moth

Cilix danieli is a moth in the family Drepanidae first described by Watson in 1968. It is found in Shanxi, China.
