= Canka =

Canka is a surname. Notable people with the name include:

- Abramo Canka (born 2002), Italian basketball player
- Līna Čanka (1893–1981), Latvian corporal
- Mikel Canka (born 1987), Albanian footballer

== See also ==
- Kanka (name), given name and surname
