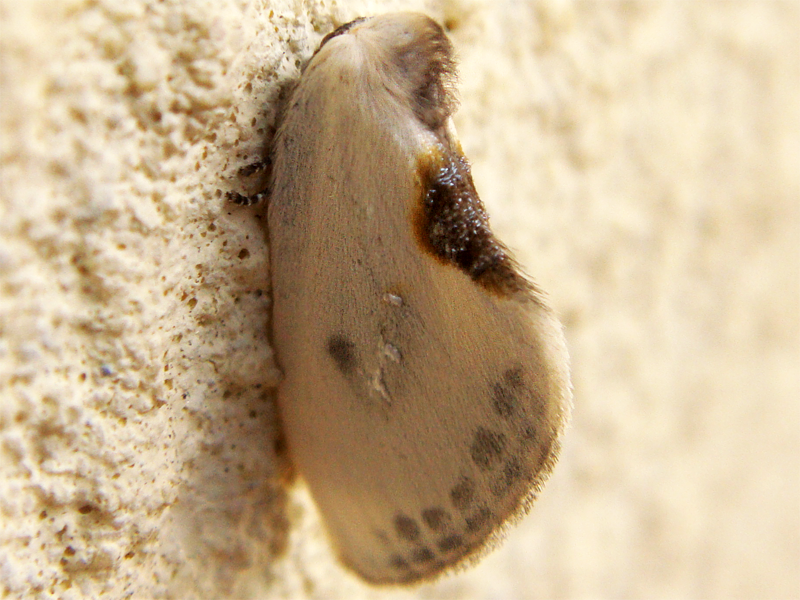
- A Cilix moth

Scientific classification
- Domain: Eukaryota
- Kingdom: Animalia
- Phylum: Arthropoda
- Class: Insecta
- Order: Lepidoptera
- Family: Drepanidae
- Subfamily: Drepaninae
- Genus: Cilix; Leach, [1815]

= Cilix (moth) =

Moth genus in family Drepanidae

Cilix is a genus of moths belonging to the subfamily Drepaninae. The genus was erected by Leach in 1815.

== Species ==
The species in this genus are:

- Cilix algirica
- Cilix argenta
- Cilix asiatica
- Cilix danieli
- Cilix depalpata
- Cilix filipjevi
- Cilix glaucata - Chinese character
- Cilix hispanica
- Cilix patula
- Cilix tatsienluica
