= Cilix patula =

Scientific classification
- Domain: Eukaryota
- Kingdom: Animalia
- Phylum: Arthropoda
- Class: Insecta
- Order: Lepidoptera
- Family: Drepanidae
- Genus: Cilix
- Species: C. patula

Binomial name
- Cilix patula Watson, 1968

Species of hook-tip moth

Cilix patula is a moth in the family Drepanidae first described by Watson in 1968. It is found in Yunnan, China.
