= Cilix depalpata =

Scientific classification
- Domain: Eukaryota
- Kingdom: Animalia
- Phylum: Arthropoda
- Class: Insecta
- Order: Lepidoptera
- Family: Drepanidae
- Genus: Cilix
- Species: C. depalpata

Binomial name
- Cilix depalpata Strand, 1911

Species of hook-tip moth

Cilix depalpata is a moth in the family Drepanidae first described by Strand in 1911. It is found in Afghanistan and Pakistan.
