= Hanka Kliese =

German politician (born 1980)

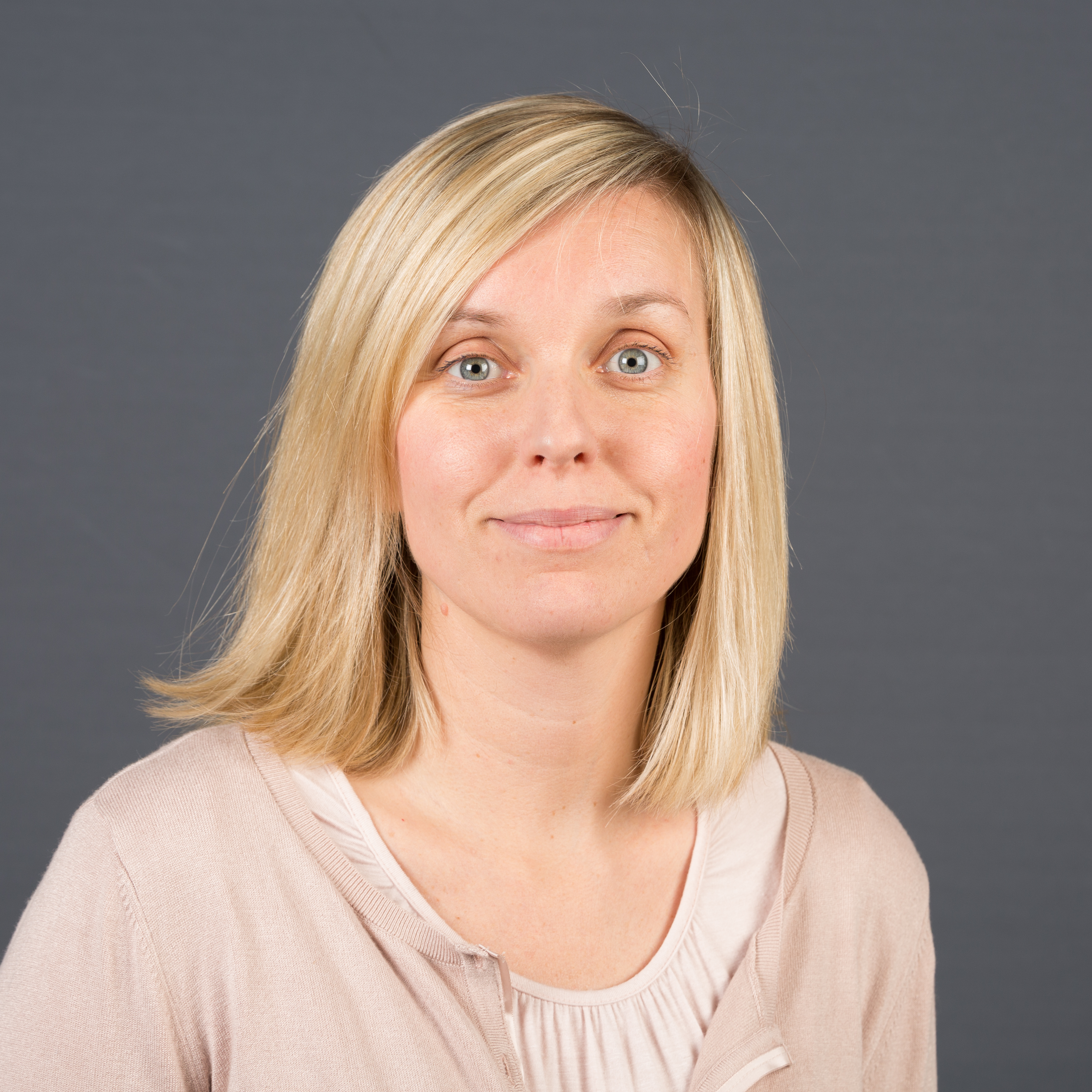
- Kliese in 2016

Member of the Landtag of Saxony
- In office 29 September 2009 – 1 October 2024

Personal details
- Born: 13 April 1980 (age 46)
- Party: Social Democratic Party (since 1997)

Hanka Kliese (born 13 April 1980) is a German politician. From 2009 to 2024, she was a member of the Landtag of Saxony. From 2018 to 2021, she served as deputy chairwoman of the Social Democratic Party in Saxony.
