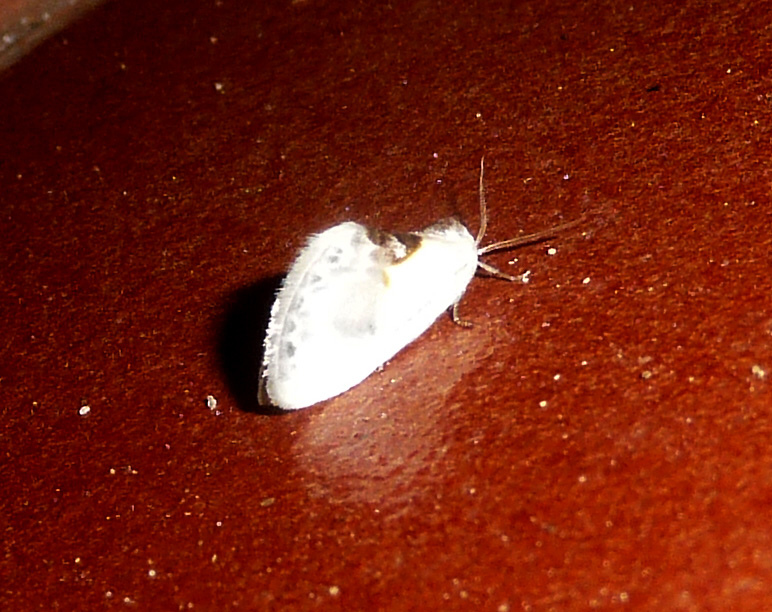

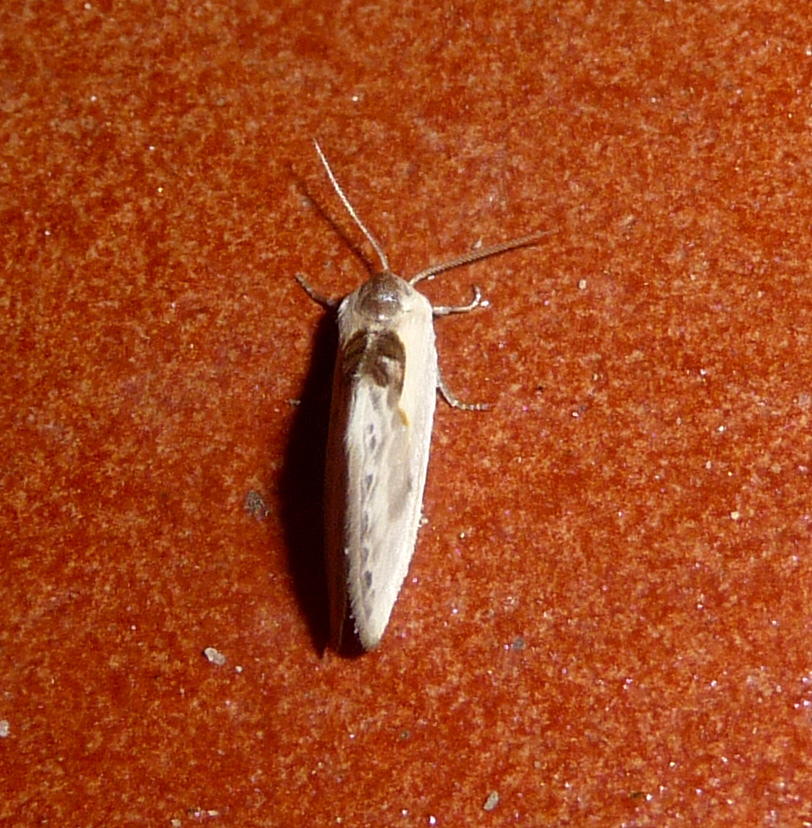

Scientific classification
- Kingdom: Animalia
- Phylum: Arthropoda
- Clade: Pancrustacea
- Class: Insecta
- Order: Lepidoptera
- Family: Drepanidae
- Genus: Cilix
- Species: C. hispanica

Binomial name
- Cilix hispanica Pérez De-Gregorio, Jeremías, Requena, Rondós & Vallhonrat, 2002

= Cilix hispanica =

Species of hook-tip moth

Cilix hispanica is a moth in the family Drepanidae. It is found in Portugal, Spain, southern France, Italy and North Africa.

The wingspan is about 25 millimetres (0.98 in). There are two generations per year.

The larvae feed on Prunus species.
