= Rubus tomentosus =

Scientific classification
- Kingdom: Plantae
- Clade: Tracheophytes
- Clade: Angiosperms
- Clade: Eudicots
- Clade: Rosids
- Order: Rosales
- Family: Rosaceae
- Genus: Rubus
- Species: R. tomentosus

Binomial name
- Rubus tomentosus Borkh. 1794

Species of fruit and plant

Rubus tomentosus is a European and Middle Eastern species of brambles in the rose family. It grows in southern and central Europe and in southwestern Asia from Portugal to Iran, north as far as Germany, Poland, and Ukraine. There are a few reports of the species sparingly naturalized in the State of West Virginia in the eastern United States.

Some sources consider R. tomentosus to be the same species as R. canescens.

The genetics of Rubus is extremely complex, so that it is difficult to decide on which groups should be recognized as species. There are many rare species with limited ranges such as this. Further study is suggested to clarify the taxonomy.
