= Cilix algirica =

Scientific classification
- Domain: Eukaryota
- Kingdom: Animalia
- Phylum: Arthropoda
- Class: Insecta
- Order: Lepidoptera
- Family: Drepanidae
- Genus: Cilix
- Species: C. algirica

Binomial name
- Cilix algirica Leraut, 2006

Species of hook-tip moth

Cilix algirica is a moth in the family Drepanidae described by Patrice J.A. Leraut in 2006. It is found in Morocco, Algeria and possibly Portugal.
