= Kanka (name) =

Kanka is a given name and surname. Notable people with the name include:

- Edvin Kanka Ćudić (born 1988), Bosnian human rights activist
- František Maxmilián Kaňka (1674–1766), Czech architect and builder
- Megan Kanka (1986–1994), child murder victim in New Jersey, United States

== See also ==
- Canka, surname
