= Hanka G =

- Birth name: Hanka Gregušová
- Also known as: Hanka G
- Born: Bratislava, Slovakia
- Genres: Jazz, R&B, vocal jazz, soul, blues, gospel
- Occupation(s): Singer, composer, writer
- Instrument: Vocals
- Labels: Hevhetia Records, Music Fund, S.E.Smith, s.r.o., Ojah Media Group LLC.
- Website: www.hankag.com

Hanka Gregušová, better known under her stage name Hanka G, is a Slovak jazz, gospel and world music singer and lyricist.

== Early life ==
Gregušová was born in Mongolia, where her parents were working as geologists on an expedition. During her childhood, she practised singing in various musical genres, before discovering jazz on a trip to Washington, D.C.

== Career ==
Gregušová was awarded a grant from the Slovak Music Fund to record her debut album, Reflections of my soul, produced by Slovak jazz saxophonist Radovan Tariška, who also performs on the album together with jazz pianist Ondrej Krajňák, Tomáš Baroš on double bass and Marián Ševčík on drums.

In 2014, Gregušová was signed by Hevhetia Publishing House, and in July that year released her second solo album, Essence, produced by Krajňák. The album is a tribute to Slovak folklore songs rearranged in jazz style by Krajňák. Various Slovak and Czech jazz musicians appeared on the album, including Josef Fečo (double bass, cymbalo), Radovan Tariška (alt and soprano saxophone), Marián Ševčík (drums), Štefan Bugala (percussion), and Ivan Herák's cymbalo band. Essence was nominated for "Record of the Year" in the jazz category at the 2014 Radio Head Awards.

In December 2016, Gregušová released her third solo album, recorded in duo with Krajňák. The album is called Twin Flame and pays tribute to celebrated jazz pianists. Gregušová chose instrumental pieces by well-known jazz pianists such as Chick Corea, McCoy Tyner, Thelonious Monk, and Mal Waldron, adding her own lyrics and vocals. The album was named after Krajňák's composition Twin Flames.

Gregušová moved to New York City in September 2016.

== Discography ==
Leader

- 2016 Twin Flame (S. E. SMITH, s.r.o.)
- 2014 Essence (Hevhetia)
- 2007 Reflections of my soul (Music Fund)

Appearances

- 2016 The Last Days of Jesus – The Last Circus
- 2014 Sisa Michalidesova – Expresie
