= Lake Khanka =

Lake on the border between Russia and China

- Lake Xingkai
- озеро Ханка (Russian); 兴凯湖 (Chinese)
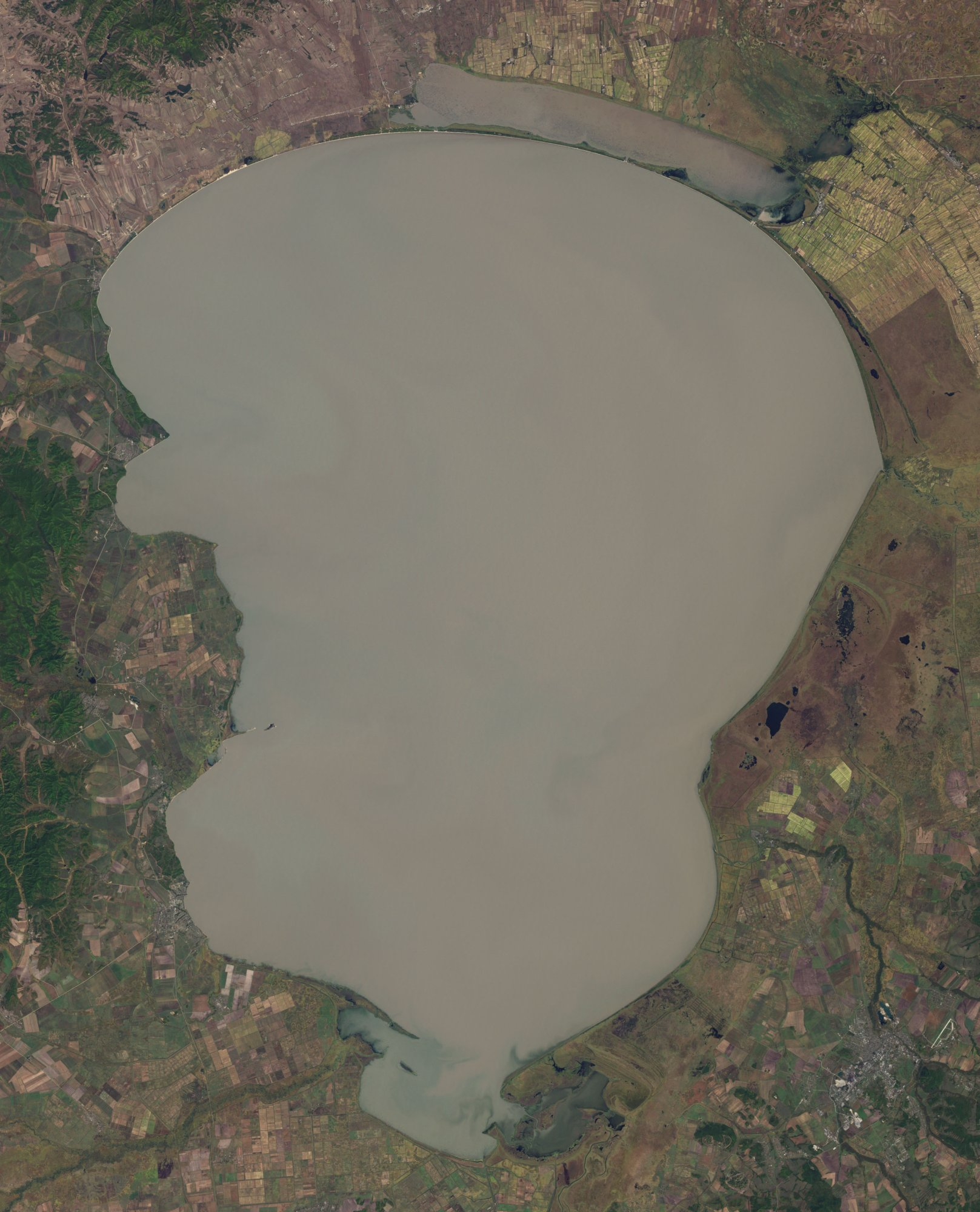
- Landsat 7 image (2001)

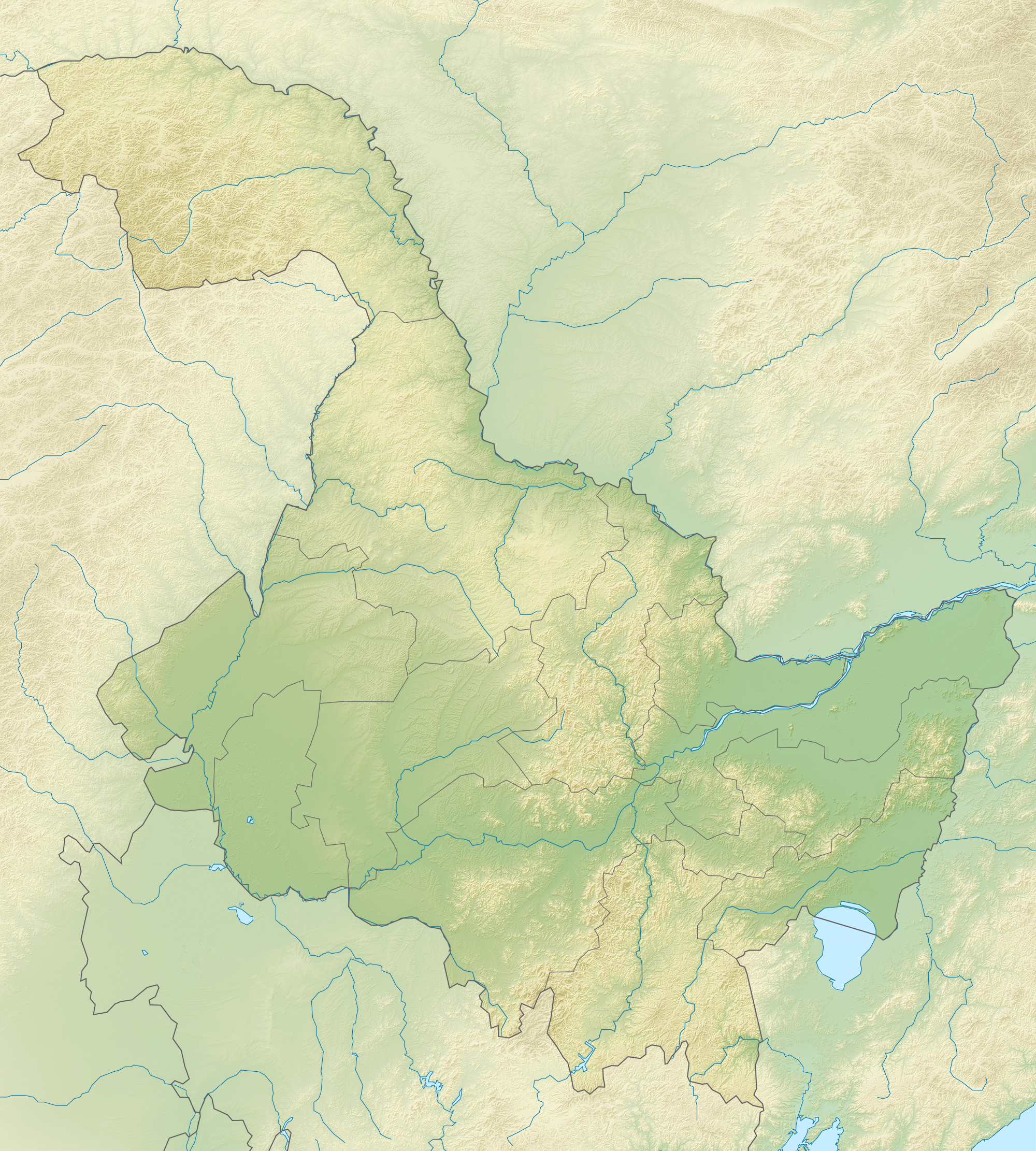
- Location in Primorsky Krai Khanka / Xingkai (Heilongjiang)
- Location: Primorsky Krai, Russia / Heilongjiang, China
- Coordinates: 45°0′N 132°25′E
- Primary outflows: Songacha River
- Basin countries: People's Republic of China, Russia
- Max. length: 90 km (56 mi)
- Max. width: 45 km (28 mi)
- Surface area: 4,070 km^{2} (1,570 sq mi)
- Average depth: 4.5 m (15 ft)
- Max. depth: 10.6 m (35 ft)
- Water volume: 18.3 km^{3} (4.4 cu mi)
- Residence time: 9.9 yrs
- Shore length^{1}: 308 km (191 mi)
- Surface elevation: 68 m (223 ft) - 70 m (230 ft)
- Frozen: December–April

Ramsar Wetland
- Official name: Lake Khanka
- Designated: 11 October 1976
- Reference no.: 112

Ramsar Wetland
- Official name: Xingkai Lake National Nature Reserve
- Designated: 1 November 2002
- Reference no.: 1155
- ^{1} Shore length is not a well-defined measure.

Lake Khanka (Russian: озеро Ханка) or Lake Xingkai (simplified Chinese: 兴凯湖; traditional Chinese: 興凱湖; pinyin: Xīngkǎi Hú), is a freshwater lake on the border between Primorsky Krai, Russia and Heilongjiang province, Northeast China (at 45°0′N 132°25′E).

== Etymology ==
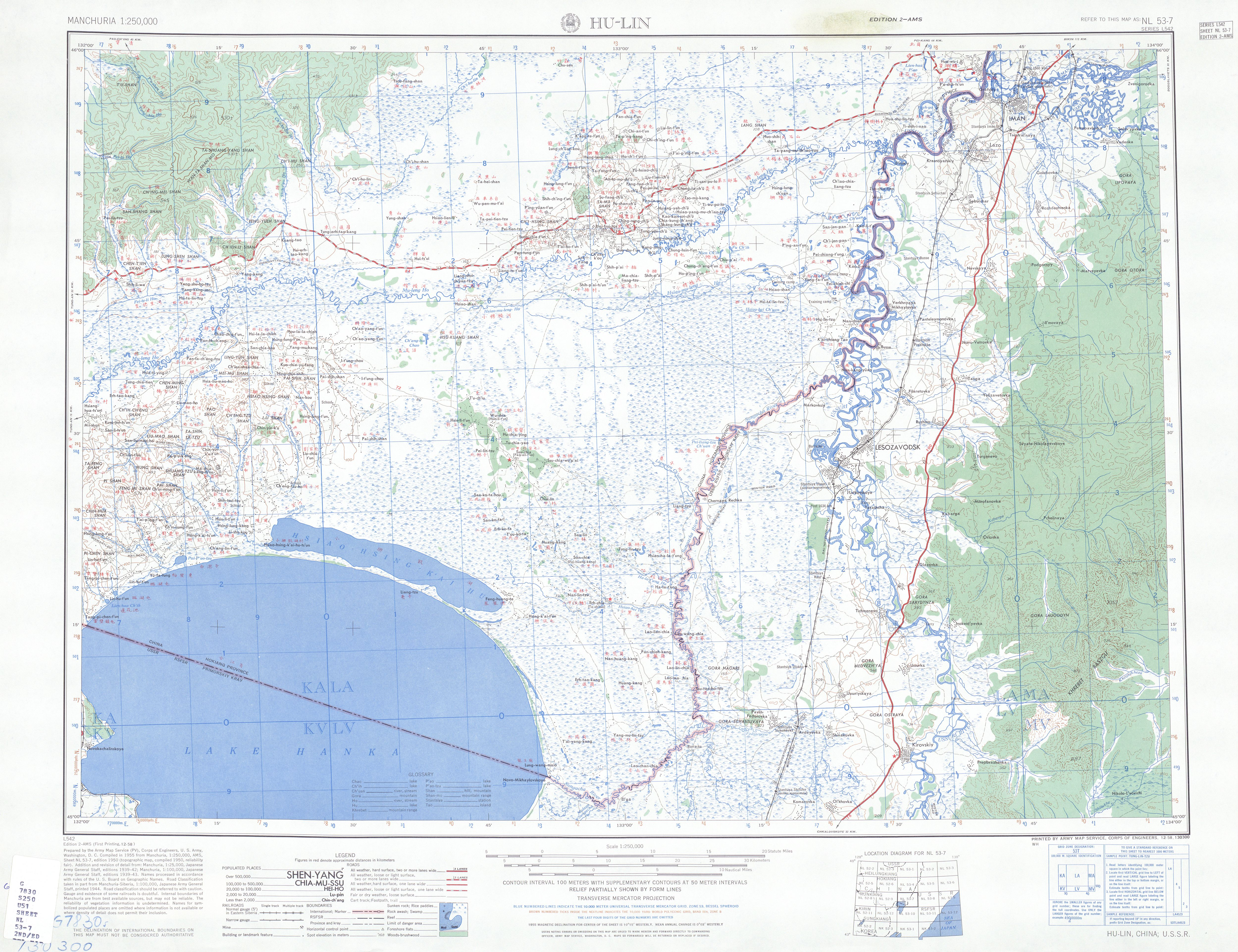
Lake Khanka (labeled as LAKE HANKA) (1955)

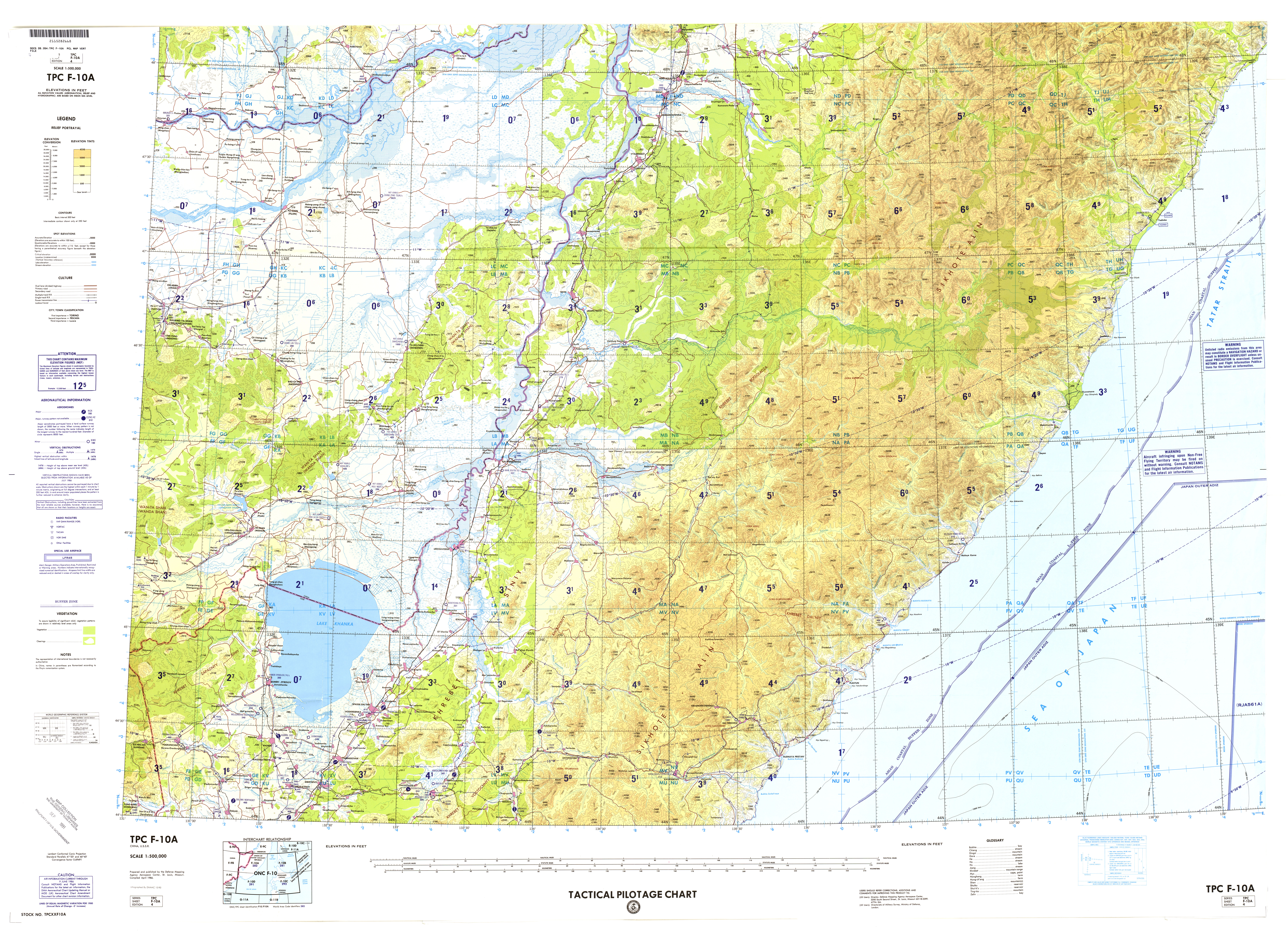
Map including Lake Khanka

On the Delisle map of 1706, the lake is named Himgon and from it flows a river labelled with the names Usurou and Ousuri.

On the 1739 map of Johann Matthias Hase, the lake is named Lake Hinka and the river flowing from it called by the names Ousoury and Schur.

On the 1752 map of d'Anville, the lake is named Hink, and the river from it is called Songhachan, which flows, in turn, into the river Usuri.

On an 18th-century map showing the "Irkutsk governorate with the adjacent islands and the western coast of America", the river issuing from Lake Hinka is named as the Usuri.

On the 1860 map attached to the Convention of Peking, two lakes are shown: the larger Oz. Khankai (Russian: "Lake Khankai"), with Khankai glossed as signifying "quiet", (but given without a Manchu transliteration), and the smaller Oz. Dobiku (Russian: "Lake Dobiku") - given with a Manchu transliteration of Dobiku. From the big lake is shown flowing a river, labelled with the Russian names Uzhu and Sungachan, with the second of these names being glossed with a Manchu transliteration.

On the 1861 map made by 'M. Popov' (= rear-admiral Andrei Alexandrovich Popov?), the larger lake is given the name Kengka, while the smaller is called Ai'-Kengka - to which name is added (in brackets) the further name Siauhu (which can be understood as a transcription of the Chinese Xiaohu, that is, "Small Lake").

On the 1864 map by A.F. Budishchev, a captain in the Corps of Foresters, the lake is named as Khinkai (Singkai).

On the ethnographic map of Shrenk the abbreviated Russian names Oz. Khanka and Oz. Mal. Khanka ("Lake Khanka" and "Little / Lesser Lake Khanka") are used.

Explorer, traveler, naturalist and writer Vladimir Arsenyev (1872–1930) wrote, concerning the name of the lake: "In the Liao Dynasty, Khanka Lake was called Beitsin-hai, but it is now known as Khanka, Khinkai and Sinkai-hu, meaning "Lake of Prosperity". It must be assumed that the name Khanka originated from another word, namely khanhai, meaning "hollow" - a name by which the Chinese call every low place...Subsequently, the Russians must have changed this word to its current form of Khanka."

== Historical studies ==
Lake Khanka is an ancient lake, rich in fish and bird species - a richness reflected in the ancient name Khankai-Omo - "Sea of bird feathers". Likewise, in the Middle Ages, the fish fauna of Lake Khanka furnished the tables of both Chinese and Jurchen emperors with an abundance of delicacies.

In 1868, Nikolay Przhevalsky visited Lake Khanka, leaving for posterity his descriptions of the flora and fauna of the lake and its surroundings. It was thirty-four years later, in 1902, that the explorer Vladimir Arsenyev made his first expedition to the area. In 1935 there was Lake Khanka incident to the west of the lake firs case in which Soviet and Japanese troops clashed during the 1935-1939 Soviet-Japanese border conflicts.

=== UFO or will o' the wisp ===
In Shen Kuo's Dream Pool Essays, a passage called "Strange Happenings" contains a peculiar account of an unidentified flying object. Shen wrote that, during the reign of Emperor Renzong (1022–1063), an object as bright as a pearl occasionally hovered over the city of Yangzhou at night, but described first by local inhabitants of eastern Anhui and then in Jiangsu. Shen wrote that a man near Xingkai Lake observed this curious object; allegedly it:

...opened its door and a flood of intense light like sunbeams darted out of it, then the outer shell opened up, appearing as large as a bed with a big pearl the size of a fist illuminating the interior in silvery white. The intense silver-white light, shot from the interior, was too strong for human eyes to behold; it cast shadows of every tree within a radius of ten miles. The spectacle was like the rising Sun, lighting up the distant sky and woods in red. Then all of a sudden, the object took off at a tremendous speed and descended upon the lake like the Sun setting.

Shen went on to say that Yibo, a poet of Gaoyou, wrote a poem about this "pearl" after witnessing it. Shen wrote that since the "pearl" often made an appearance around Fanliang in Yangzhou, the people there erected a "Pearl Pavilion" on a wayside, where people came by boat in hopes to see the mysterious flying object.

== Physico-geographical characteristics ==
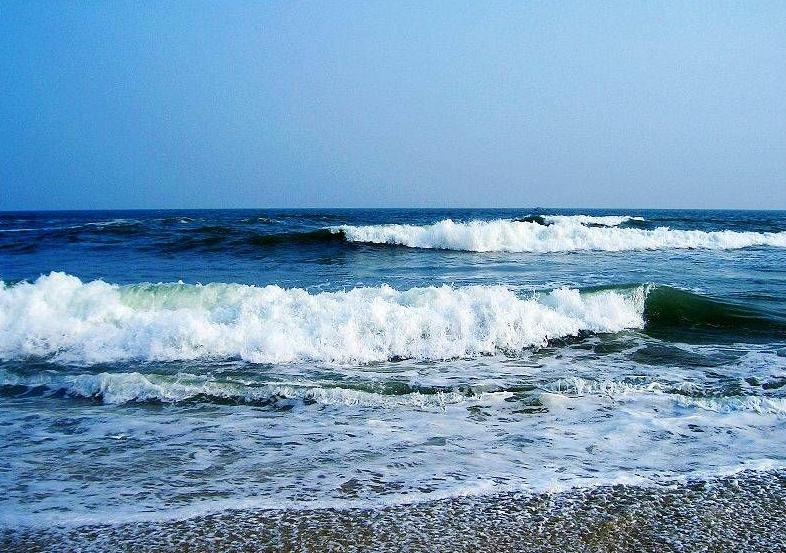
The north side of Lake Khanka in China

Lake Khanka, the largest lake in Primorsky Krai, is located in the centre of the Khankan lowland on the border with the People's Republic of China in Heilongjiang Province. The northern part of the lake is in Chinese territory. The lake is pear-shaped, with an extension in its northern part. The surface area of the water is highly variable, depending on climate conditions. The maximum extension reaches 5,010 km^{2} (1,930 sq mi), the minimum extension is 3,940 km^{2} (1,520 sq mi). The length of the lake is about 90 km (56 mi), the maximum width is 67 km (42 mi). There are 24 rivers flowing into Lake Khanka, with only one outflow: Songacha River, which connects it with the Ussuri, and that in turn with the Amur River system.

Lake Khanka is a shallow body of water, with an average depth of 4.5 metres (15 ft) and a prevailing depth of 1–3 metres (3.3–9.8 ft); the greatest depth is 10.6 m (35 ft). Its average volume is 18.3 km^{3} (4.4 cu mi), though it can fill up to 22.6 km^{3} (5.4 cu mi). The water in the lake is cloudy, which is explained by frequent winds and, as a result, strong mixing. On average, the water inflow is about 1.94 km^{3} (0.47 cu mi) per year, and the outflow about 1.85 km^{3} (0.44 cu mi).

On the northern (Chinese) shore lies Lake Small Khanka (Chinese: 小兴凯湖; pinyin: Xiaoxingkai Hu; Russian: о́зеро Малая Ха́нка, ozero Malaya Khanka), separated from Lake Khanka proper by a narrow sandy spit.

Khanka Lake freezes in the second half of November and thaws in April.

The fauna and flora of Lake Khanka are rich in species. In 1971, the Ramsar Convention gave the lake the status of a wetland of international importance. In 1990, the Khanka Nature Reserve was organized in part of the then-Soviet basin of Lake Khanka. In April 1996, an agreement was signed between the Governments of the Russian Federation and the People's Republic of China on the establishment of an international Russian-Chinese nature reserve around the lake, from the Khankai Reserve in Russia and the Chinese Singkai-Hu Reserve.

The wetlands of the Lake Khanka basin (Водно-болотные угодья озера Ханка, Vodno-bolotnye ugod'ya ozera Khanka) represent a unique natural complex. The lowland of the Prihanka and, in fact, the shores of the lake represent a fairly swampy terrain. So-called melt-plant communities, formed by various species of sedge and grass, form a solid turf covering the water mirror for many tens of square kilometers. Diverse ecosystems are represented, such as meadows (from marshy to steppe), meadow forest, forest-steppe and steppe plant communities. In the lake itself there are many species of fish and aquatic invertebrates, many of which are endemic. In the lake there live 52 species of fish, among them such as carp, perch, silver carp, catfish, and snakehead. A variety of birds nest and stop on the lake or its banks.

The lake's drainage basin covers an area of 16,890 km^{2} (6,520 sq mi), of which 97% is in Russian territory. It is fed by 23 rivers (8 in China and 15 in Russia), but the only outflow of the lake is the Songacha River.

The maximum monthly mean temperature is 20 °C (68 °F) in July, while the minimum monthly mean temperature is −21 °C (−6 °F) in January. Rainfall mainly occurs in summer, with average annual precipitation of 500–650 mm annually.

The residence time of Lake Khanka is 9.9 years.

== Biodiversity and environment ==
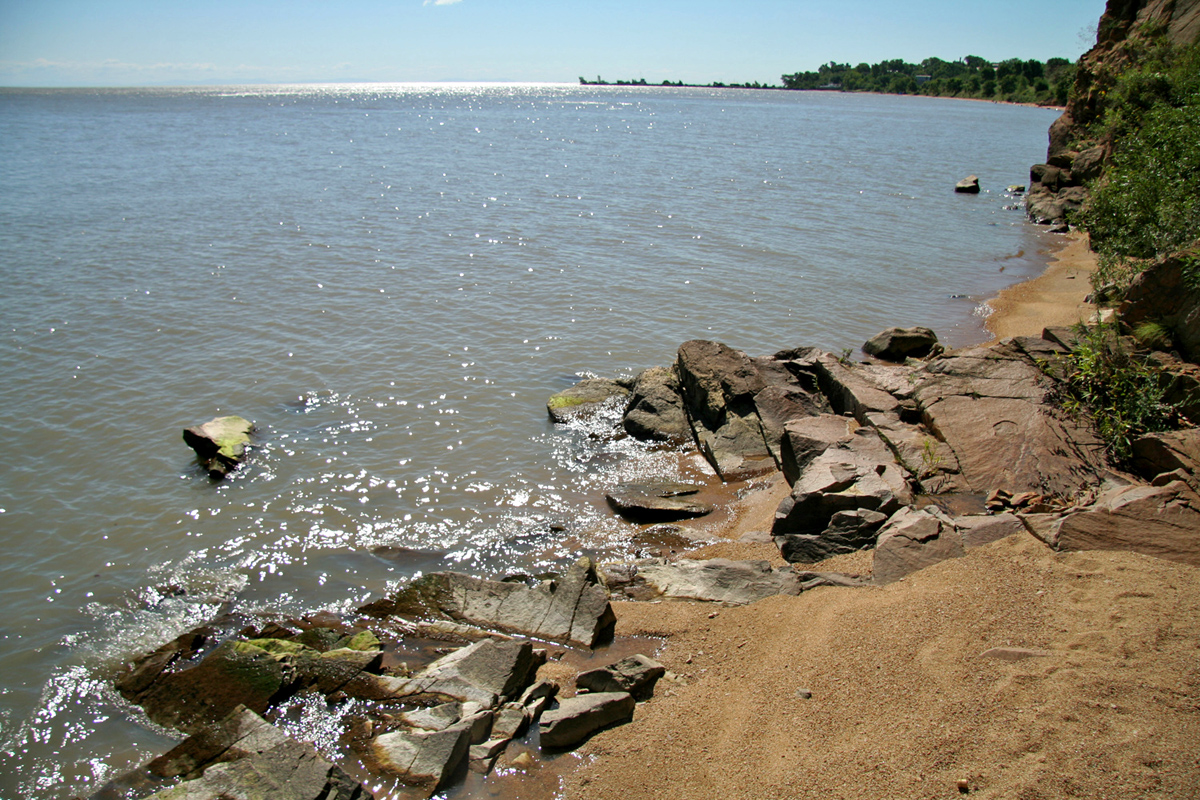
West Lake shore

The lake is an important area for birds, and includes a number of endangered species.

== In popular culture ==
In the 1975 Akira Kurosawa film Dersu Uzala, his only non-Japanese-language film, the surveyors were sent to explore the Lake Khanka region.
