= Sungacha =

River in Russia and China

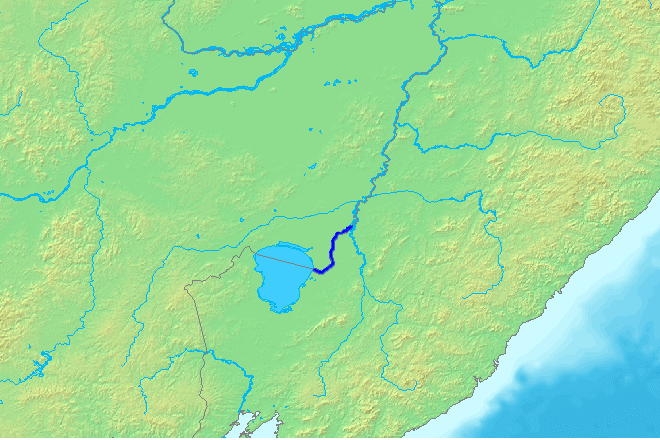
- Sungacha (dark blue)

Location
- Country: Russia, People's Republic of China

Physical characteristics
- Source
  - location: Khanka Lake
- Mouth: Ussuri
  - coordinates: 45.5751°N 133.4152°E
- Length: 180 km (110 mi), up to 210 km (130 mi)
- Basin size: 25,600 km^{2} (9,900 sq mi)

Basin features
- Progression: Ussuri→ Amur→ Sea of Okhotsk

The Sungacha or Songacha (Russian: Сунгача Sungacha or Сунгач Sungach, Chinese: 松阿察河; pinyin: Sōngàchá Hé) is a river marking part of the border between the Russian Federation and the People's Republic of China. It is a left tributary of the Ussuri, and the only outflow of Khanka Lake.

The 180-to-210-kilometer (110 to 130 mi)-long Sungacha's length fluctuates, as the stream bed changes every year. The area of its basin is approximately 25,600 km^{2} (9,900 mi^{2}), of which 21,000 km^{2} (8,100 mi^{2}) is within Russia.

The river supports a rich diversity of flora and fauna, including Nelumbo nucifera in its basin.

The Sungacha's waters come from rain, snow and springs.
