= Ussuri =

River in the Russian Far East and Northeast China

Ussuri ᡠᠰᡠᡵᡳ ᡠᠯᠠ
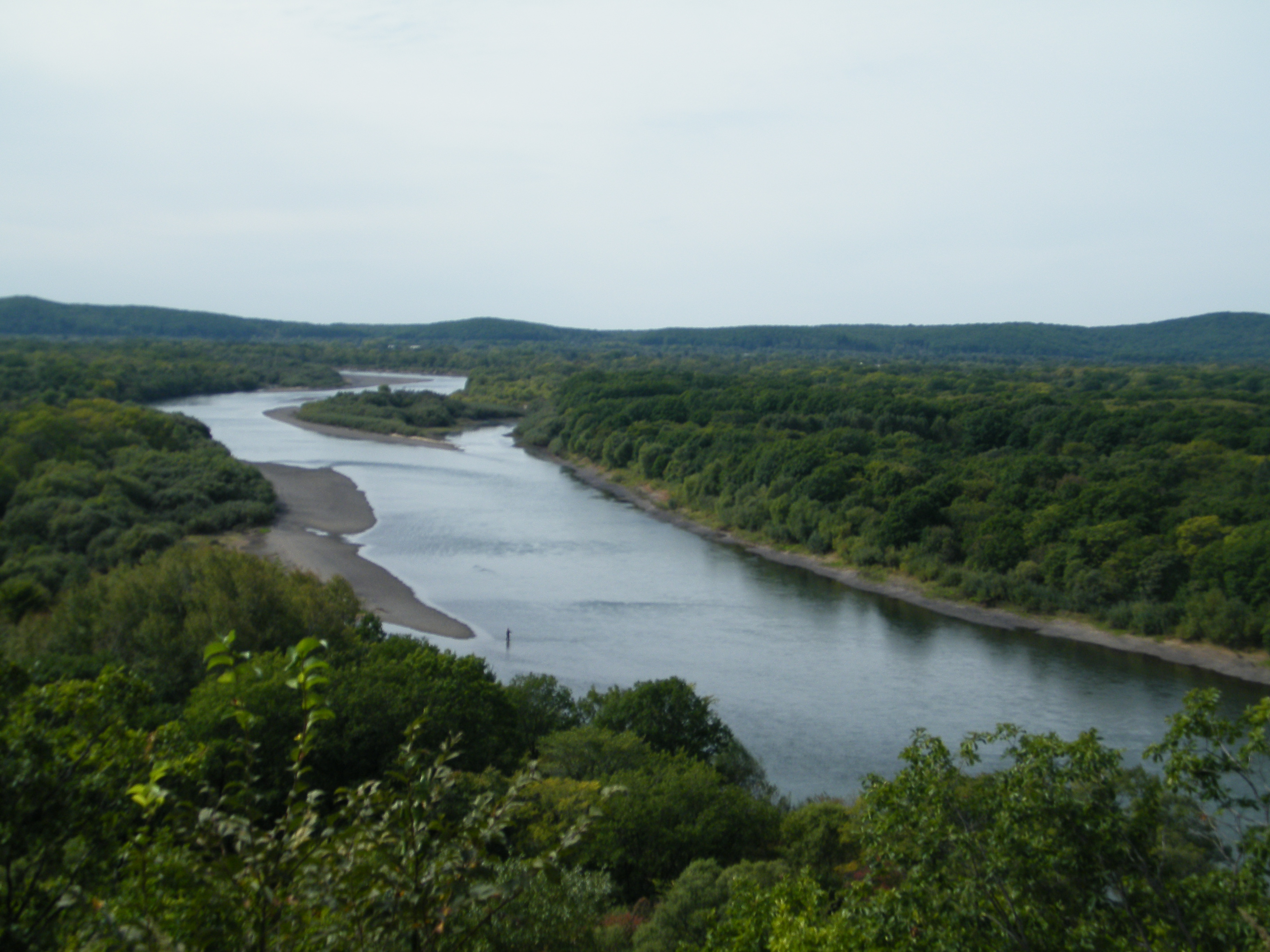

Location
- Country: China, Russia

Physical characteristics
- Mouth: Amur
  - coordinates: 48.2666°N 134.7204°E
- Length: 897 km (557 mi)
- Basin size: 193,000 km^{2} (75,000 sq mi)
- Discharge
  - location: Khabarovsk, Russia (near mouth)
  - average: 1,620 m^{3}/s (57,000 cu ft/s)

Basin features
- Progression: Amur→ Sea of Okhotsk

Ussuri
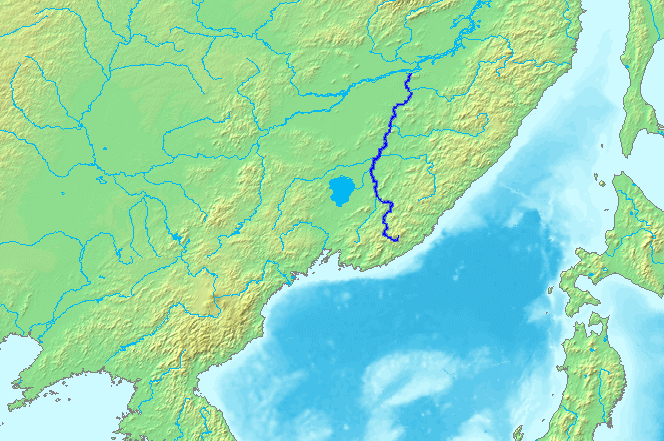

Chinese name
- Traditional Chinese: 烏蘇里江
- Simplified Chinese: 乌苏里江
Transcriptions
Standard Mandarin
- Hanyu Pinyin: Wūsūlǐ Jiāng
- Gwoyeu Romatzyh: Usulii Jiang
- Wade–Giles: Wu^{1}su^{1}li^{3} Chiang^{1}
- IPA: [ú.sú.lì tɕjáŋ]

Manchu name
- Manchu script: ᡠᠰᡠᡵᡳ ᡠᠯᠠ
- Romanization: usuri ula

Russian name
- Russian: река Уссури
- Romanization: reka Ussuri

The Ussuri (/uːˈsʊəri/ oo-SOOR-ee; Russian: Уссури [ʊsˈsurʲɪ]) or Wusuli (Chinese: 乌苏里; pinyin: wūsūlǐ [ǔsǔlî]) is a river that runs through Khabarovsk and Primorsky Krais, Russia and the southeast region of Northeast China in the province of Heilongjiang. It rises in the Sikhote-Alin mountain range, flowing north and forming part of the Sino-Russian border (which is based on the Sino-Russian Convention of Peking of 1860), until it joins the Amur as a tributary near Khabarovsk. It is approximately 897 km (557 mi) long. The Ussuri drains the Ussuri basin, which covers 193,000 km^{2} (75,000 mi^{2}). Its waters come from rain (60%), snow (30–35%), and subterranean springs. The average discharge is 1,620 m^{3}/s (57,000 cu ft/s), and the average elevation is 1,682 metres (5,518 ft).

== Names ==
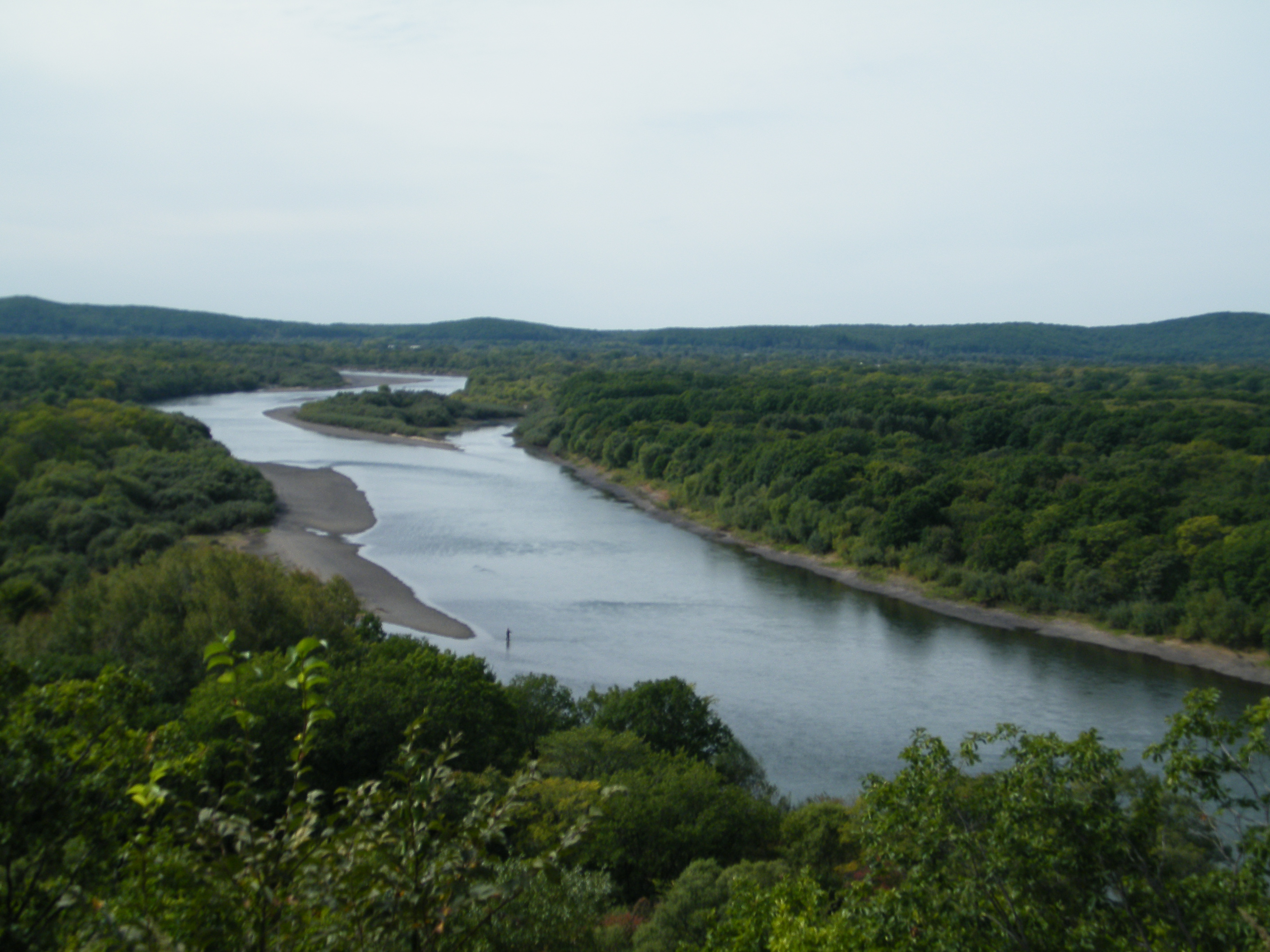
The Ussuri near Gornye Klyuchi

The Ussuri has been known by many names. In Manchu, it was called the Usuri Ula or Dobi Bira (River of Foxes) and in Mongolian the Üssüri Müren. Ussuri is Manchu for soot-black river.

== History ==
- The Ussuri has a reputation for catastrophic floods. It freezes up in November and stays under the ice until April. The river teems with different kinds of fish: grayling, sturgeon, humpback salmon (gorbusha), chum salmon (keta), and others.
- During World War II, the river marked one of the boundaries which Soviet forces crossed into Manchuria in Operation August Storm in 1945.
- The Sino-Soviet border conflict of 1969 took place at the Soviet Damansky Island on the Ussuri River.

== Tributaries ==
Major tributaries of the Ussuri are, from source to mouth:

- Arsenyevka (left)
- Sungacha (left)
- Muling (left)
- Bolshaya Ussurka (right)
- Bikin (right)
- Naoli (left)
- Khor (right)

== See also ==
- Ussuri brown bear
- Ussurian tiger
- Suiphun–Khanka meadows and forest meadows

== Sources ==
- Narangoa, Li (2014). Historical Atlas of Northeast Asia, 1590-2010: Korea, Manchuria, Mongolia, Eastern Siberia. New York: Columbia University Press. ISBN 9780231160704.
