= Mayi River =

- Native name: 蚂蚁河 (Chinese)

Location
- Country: People's Republic of China
- Province: Heilongjiang Province

Physical characteristics
- Mouth: Songhua River
  - coordinates: 45°56′47″N 128°44′25″E
- Length: 341 kilometers

The Mayi River (Chinese: 蚂蚁河), sometimes spelled Mayi He, Mayihe River, also known as Mayan River (蚂蜒河), is a river in Heilongjiang Province, People's Republic of China, and is an important tributary of the Songhua River.

Mayi River originates in the Zhangguangcai Ridge (张广才岭) area of the Changbai Mountains, flows west to Shangzhi Town, Shangzhi City, and curves to the northeast, through Yanshou County, Fangzheng County, and is injected into the right bank of the Songhua River in Songnan Township (松南乡), Fangzheng County. The total length of the river is 341 kilometers, and the total drainage area is 10,727 square kilometers.
