= List of Chinese provincial-level divisions by highest point =

This is a list of the first-level administrative divisions of the People's Republic of China (PRC), including all provinces, autonomous regions, special administrative regions and municipalities, in order of their highest points. Taiwan Province, the territory of which is administered by the Republic of China but claimed by the People's Republic of China, is included for comparison purposes.

== List ==
Rank	Division	Location	Altitude in m (ft)
1	Tibet	Chomolungma (Mount Everest)	8,848 (29,029)
2	Xinjiang	Qogir (K2)	8,611 (28,251)
3	Sichuan	Mount Gongga	7,556 (24,790)
4	Qinghai	Bukadaban Feng	6,860 (22,501)
5	Yunnan	Kawagebo	6,740 (22,113)
6	Gansu	Altyn-Tagh	5,798 (19,022)
	Taiwan	Yushan	3,952 (12,966)
7	Shaanxi	Mount Taibai	3,767 (12,356)
8	Inner Mongolia	Main Peak, Helan Mountains	3,556 (11,664)
8	Ningxia	Main Peak, Helan Mountains	3,556 (11,664)
10	Hubei	Shennong Peak	3,105 (10,184)
11	Shanxi	Mount Wutai	3,058 (10,033)
12	Guizhou	Jiucaiping	2,900 (9,512)
13	Hebei	Mount Xiaowutai	2,882 (9,453)
14	Jilin	Baekdu Mountain	2,744 (9,003)
15	Chongqing	Mount Guangtou	2,685 (8,806)
16	Henan	Laoyachan'ao	2,414 (7,918)
17	Beijing	Mount Ling	2,303 (7,554)
18	Fujian	Mount Huanggang, Wuyi Mountains	2,158 (7,080)
18	Jiangxi	Mount Huanggang, Wuyi Mountains	2,158 (7,080)
20	Guangxi	Mount Mao'er	2,141 (7,022)
21	Hunan	Mount Huping	2,099 (6,885)
22	Zhejiang	Huangmao Peak	1,921 (6,301)
23	Guangdong	Shikengkong	1,902 (6,239)
24	Anhui	Lianhua Peak, Huangshan Mountains	1,873 (6,143)
25	Hainan	Mount Wuzhi	1,867 (6,124)
26	Heilongjiang	Datudingzi Mountain	1,690 (5,543)
27	Shandong	Jade Emperor Peak, Mount Tai	1,545 (5,068)
28	Liaoning	Mount Huabozi	1,336 (4,382)
29	Tianjin	Jiushan Peak	1,078 (3,536)
30	Hong Kong	Tai Mo Shan	957 (3,139)
31	Jiangsu	Mount Huaguo	625 (2,050)
32	Macau	Coloane Alto	172 (564)
33	Shanghai	Sheshan Hill	118 (387)

Territorial claims without actual administration. Yushan is on the border of Kaohsiung City, Nantou County and Chiayi County of the Republic of China.
