= Heilongjiang delegation to the National People's Congress =

Heilongjiang Delegation to the National People's Congress
- 全国人民代表大会黑龙江省代表团
- Delegation for the National People's Congress
- Map showing the location of Heilongjiang Province
- Electoral unit: Heilongjiang Province
- Population: 31,850,088

Current Delegation
- Created: 1954
- Seats: 84
- Head of delegation: Xu Qin
- Provincial People's Congress: Heilongjiang Provincial People's Congress

The Heilongjiang delegation to the National People's Congress is a delegation composed of deputies representing Heilongjiang Province within the National People's Congress (NPC), the supreme organ of state power of the People's Republic of China. NPC deputies from the Heilongjiang Province are officially elected by the Heilongjiang Provincial People's Congress.

== List of deputies ==
| Year | NPC sessions | Deputies | Number of deputies | Ref. |
|---|---|---|---|---|
| 1954 | 1st | Bayanhu, Wang Yilun, Wang Ximing, Ren Guodong, Li Yanlu, Li Fanwu, Lin Na, Jin Baishan, Sun Xiaoju, Gao Chongmin, Cui Guoshan, Liang Jun, Chen Lei, Tao Shufan, Yang Xianting, Deng Guozhang, Han Youtong, Guan Baoxiang | | |
| 1959 | 2nd | Yu Kaiquan, Wang Sunci, Wang Ximing, Wang Zhen, Deng Guozhang, Bayanhu, Mao Cheng (female), Shi Zengrong, Bai Xiqing, Liu Changrui, Liu Peizhi, Ren Zhongyi, Su Guangming, Li Yanlu, Li Fanwu, Lu Ping, Lin Na (female), Jin Baishan, Gao Chongmin, Ma Yongshun, Ma Hengchang, Xu Zhifen (female), Liang Jun (female), Guo Jiyun (female), Tao Shufan (female), Cui Guoshan, Yang Xianting, Chu Yinghuang, Han Youtong (female) | | |
| 1964 | 3rd | Ding Fengshui, Yu Kaiquan, Yu Qingxian, Ma Yongshun, Ma Longtu, Ma Hengchang, Wang Lijiang, Wang Sunci, Wang Jinxi, Wang Zheng, Wang Jinling, Wang Bingcheng, Wang Zhe, Wang Guilin, Wang Qingzheng, Wang Zhen, You Zhixian, Yin Kun, Ning Yuchuan, Feng Tianyi, Shi Zengrong, Lu Lingchang, Lu Qingjun, You Xinchuan, Cong Shen, Bai Xiqing, Liu Changrui, Liu Shengbiao, Liu Tingxun, Liu Shusen, Liu Peizhi, Liu Qian, Zhuang Fenggan, Guan Shengqi, Cheng Shenyu, Lü Qien, Lü He, Lü Qing, Zhu Guangyi, Zhu Yajie, Zhu Hongchang, Zhu Lianqing, Zhu Kangfu, Mou Sen, Sun Benwang, Sun Maosong, Sun Weibao, Shen Zhenggong, Shen Yuerui, Shen Hong, Wang De Xi, Yan Meihe, Su Guangming, Du Ruomu, Li Yunchuan, Li Zaigen, Li Zaide, Li Yanlu, Li Yizhang, Li Fanwu, Li Qi, Li Rong, Li Jinghe, Li Kuisheng, Li Guiying, Yang Xiaoting, Yang Ruozhen, Yang Yichen, Yang Xianting, Xiao Buyang, Wu Tianlin, Wu Zhonglun, Wu Kelu, Yu Youtai, Zhang Shijun, Zhang Zhaoying, Zhang Qilong, Zhang Lin, Zhang Jinlan, Zhang Hongchi, Zhang Fusheng, Zhang Jiaqi, Lu Jingyun, Chen Youbao, Chen Guangxi, Chen Jun, Chen Tiekai, Wu Chi, Wu Jingtian, Lin Na, Lin Feng, Jin Zhihong, Zhou Meiying, Meng Shugang, Meng Ersheng, Hong Jing, Zhao Guohua, Nan Jingyuan, Hu Qili, Hu Xiangbi, Yu BingyuanZhong Ziyun, Fei Qineng, Gao Chongmin, Guo Song, Qin Dongbin, Yuan Zhongyun, Jia Huanzhang, Chao Mei, Qian Sanqiang, Xu Zhifen, Liang Yiming, Liang Jun, Kang Shien, Yan Peilin, Cao Xiuying, Cao Hesun, Cui Xingshu, Fu Xianshou, Zeng Shiyu, Huang Wei, Ge Mingyu, Dong Dianfu, Han Yunqin, Han Guang, Han Youtong, Chu Yinghuang, Cai Jintao, Zhai Fengting, Xiong Dajing, Xue Lanbin, Xue Shouchen | | |
| 1975 | 4th | Yu Weihan, Shan Qiulin, Ma Qingfu, Ma Xingli, Ma Hengchang, Wang Wenguo, Wang Wenfu, Wang Shuangyin, Wang Jiang, Wang Huaiyi, Wang Jinling, You Qing, Niu Chengshan, Yin Kun, Gu Xuanhui, Shi Dejiang, Buhe, Lu Jinggui, Tian Yuhe, Feng Wenxiu, Bian Fuqin, Lü Changsong, Ren Zhizhong, Liu Changhai, Liu Fa, Liu Jijun, Liu Guangtao, Liu Huixian, Liu Suxian, Liu Shuxia, Qi Ruyuan, An Yushu, Sun Yongsheng, Sun Xiuzhen, Su Guangming, Su Yujie, Li Yongqing, Li Zaigen, Li Yanlu, Li He, Li Guilin, Li Xirong Yang Yichen, Yang Yaqin, Xiao Lianying, Min Zhenzhou, Song Zhenye, Zhang Shimin, Zhang Tingdong, Zhang Hongchi, Zhang Juzhi, Zhang Jinglin, Ayuletugui, Chen Wenzhong, Chen Zaofan, Jin Shiying, Jin Zhenshu, Zhou Zhanao, Zhou Limei, Fang Shusong, Qu Qinghua, Meng Qinghai, Zhao Yulin, Zhao Jinyan, Zhao Jingquan, Zhao Dianlou, Hao Yuhua, Fei Enxin, Gerengqimuge, Gu Bensheng, Gu Xuntang, Xu Yongzhi, Cao Zhi, Cui Yunfeng, Dong Shuangqin, Hui Fengshan, Fu Fenglan, Fu Huimin, Wen Cunzhi, Wen Rongxi, Yan Wenbin, Wei Xingzheng | | |
| 1978 | 5th | Yu Xingzhou, Yu Hongxia, Ma Wenzhang, Ma Hengchang, Ma Shufen, Wang Yilun, Wang Yuqin, Wang Lijiang, Wang Shoumao, Wang Qimin, Wang Jinzi, Wang Jinling, Wang Yuming, Wang Tao, Wang Haide, Wang Weizhi, Fang Dazhong, Yin Kun, Kong Qingfang, Gu Xuanhui, Shi Fu, Zhanbulazhabu, Cong Jianglin, Cong Shen, Feng Guoxiang, Bi Fengqin, Lü Zhengku, Zhu Xiulan, Zhu Guiying, Ren Zhizhong, Wu Chengliang, Liu Fa, Liu Fa, Liu Huixian, Liu Zhenlin, Liu Jisheng, Xu Guizhi, Sun Chunyu, Sun Weibao, Su Guangming, Du Yuqin, Li Li'an, Li Shaoting, Li Changrong, Li Wencai, Li Wenxin, Li Shiqi, Li Zaigen, Li Yanjun, Li Yanlu, Li He, Li Chunlin, Li Rong, Li Shuwu, Li Jingrong, Li Xirong, Li Defan, Yang Qiming, Yang Yichen, Xiao Buyang, He Benchu, He Shuyun, Zhang Lixin, Zhang Tingdong, Zhang Xiuyuan, Zhang Qi, Zhang Jinglin, Zhang Ruilin, Lu Qianglin, Chen Daqin, Chen Guangxi, Chen Zuoshan, Chen Jianfei, Chen Liemin, Chen Lei, Yuan Guangcheng, Jiergeler, Ouyang Qin, Luo Guiqin, Jin Zhenshu, Zhou Zhanao, Zhou Lai, Zong Dashun, Meng Qinghai, Meng Likun, Zhao Ziying, Zhao Qingshan, Zhao Guohua, Zhao Jingquan, Nan Jingyuan, Liu Guizhi, Zhan Changkun, Hastoya, Fei Xin, Yao Jun, Xu Yongwang, Tang Shunbin, Zhu Maowu, Tao Jiamu, Huang Jiayou, Cui Yunfeng, Dong Xichen, Han Xingsheng, Chao Ke, Hui Fengshan, Fu Huating, Fu Huimin | | |
| 1983 | 6th | Ding Renjie, Bu Lin, Yu Fatang, Yu Xiang, Yu Shuzhen, Ma Hengchang, Ma Dehai, Wang Shizhen, Wang Yuanjun, Wang Huacheng, Wang Lijiang, Wang Shoumao, Wang Xiuying, Wang Tidao, Wang Zongxiang, Wang Yingli, Wang Zhonghai, Wang Jinling, Wang Gui, Wang Hongzheng, Wang Hongtu, Wang Guilin, Wang Tao, Wang Jiwen, Wang Demin, Wang Deyu, Gou Wanzhen, Fang Dazhong, Yin Chuanjian, Ba Feng, Gu Xuanhui, Shi Chunji, Shi Fu, Lu Zhe, Bai Shiming, Cong Shen, Feng Jiachao, Zhu Xinhe, Liu Kaiyuan, Liu Fengwu, Liu Yuzhen, Liu Hua, Liu Xiwu, Liu Huixian, Liu Guiqin, Liu Xinchun, An Zhendong, Sun Weibao, Sun Tao, Su Zhiquan, Li Chang Rong, Li Zhifang, Li Da, Li Peiju, Li Shuwu, Li Gui, Li Shuqin, Li Jinghua, Yang Yichen, Xiao Buyang, Wu Guofang, Wu Meng, Wu Dinghe, Qiu Xingya, Tong Yulan, Song Jiaming, Zhang Yunqing, Zhang Li, Zhang Runsheng, Zhang Weide, Zhang Qi, Chen Guangxi, Chen Huaxiong, Chen Junsheng, Chen Jianfei, Chen Liemin, Chen Jixiang, Chen Lei, Chen Tui, Wu Zhanting, Ji Guiyan, Jin Zaiming, Zhou Zhanao, Zheng Zuzhi, Zheng Longhui, Meng Chuansheng, Meng Chen, Meng Meihua, Zhao Fengyun, Zhao Guangwu, Zhao Jikai, Zhao Dezun, Liu Guizhi, Hou Lüfen, Shi Wenqing, Jiang Shengjie, Jiang Junkui, Hong Baoyuan, Nie Binglin, Mo Baoying, Xi ShaojiaGao Yongcheng, Gao Zongyi, Guo Youquan, Guo Zhijian, Zhu Maowu, Huang Wei, Huang Jiayou, Huang Dexin, Cao Guifeng, Chang Yajie, Ma Shuhua, Kang Lanyong, Liang Zhiyi, Ji Hanxiong, Fu Huating, Lu Guang, Xie Biao, Lai Yonghe, Zi Xianzhang, Yan Manling, Mu Yejun, Dai Yishan, Wei Shuliang | | |
| 1988 | 7th | Ding Ruopeng, Ding Shuqin, Yu Shizhen, Yu Baoqing, Ma Xiuzhi, Ma Ji, Wang Rensheng, Wang Zhifu, Wang Fengsheng, Wang Jun, Wang Wuru, Wang Xiulin, Wang Jinshan, Wang Jinling, Wang Zongxiang, Wang Zongzhang, Wang Shuli, Wang Guiqin, Wang Demin, Yuan Rongtai, Niu Yushan, Yin Chuanjian, Gu Xuanhui, Shi Yan, Shi Fu, Lu Lijuan, Lu Zhe, Shen Guan, Tian Fengshan, Tian Peilan, Tian Fuquan, Bai Shiming, Bai Xiuzhi, Cong Fukui, Feng Xingyi, Gong Yanrong, You Lin, Hui Jianren, Zhu Jielin, Liu Wanku, Liu Wenju, Liu Huixian, Qi Guodong, An Zhendong, Xu Zhongren, Xu Luming, Sun Liping, Sun Weiben, Su Zhenghua, Li Zhifang, Li Jin Shun, Li Shuwu, Li Jianbai, Li Jinghua, Li Xiyin, Yang Zhaohui, Yang Yingliu, Yang Yinglian, Yang Jinlong, Yang Jingsu, Wu Dinghe, Wu Zhiyong, Qiu Xiaolan, Qiu Qing, He Yonglin, Tong Yulan, Tong Xiangyou, Song Zhenji, Song Shouqin, Zhang Jiurong, Zhang Chengyi, Zhang Qingjiu, Zhang Lixian, Zhang Ruoxian, Zhang Hong, Zhang Guofan, Zhang Yi, Chen Huaxiong, Chen Zhikui, Chen Fubin, Yuan Guiying, Luo Xisheng, Jin Caishun, Jin Yuchun, Zhou Changji, Zhou Zhanao, Zheng Zuzhi, Zheng Longhui, Lang Chundan, Zhao Yucai, Zhao Guoliang, Hao Baoquan, Hao Jianheng, Hu Ping, Hou Jie, Jiang Shengjie, Hong Baoyuan, Gong Benyan, He Junxiu, Nie BinglinMo Xiuyan, Mo Mingzhu, Mo Baoying, Jia Shuhua, Qian Yuanchun, Xu Maofang, Luan Yutian, Gao Mingsan, Gao Zhenyuan, Gao Guihua, Tao Chenglin, Huang Xianyao, Cao Chuixun, Cui Mingshun, Cui Zhifu, Wei Jianxing, Dong Guizhen, Ji Hanxiong, Fu Xiurong, Xie Biao, Dou Ruixia, Yan Manling, Yi He, Pan Lijuan, Mu Yejun, Dai Yukun, Wei Lian | | |
| 1993 | 8th | Diao Jiayun, Yu Hongen, Yu Weihan, Wang Rensheng, Wang Zhifu, Wang Fengsheng, Wang Wenzhi, Wang Hanzhong, Wang Jun, Wang Wuru, Wang Yinglin, Wang Jinling, Wang Guizhong, Wang Yuehua, Wang Demin, You Yuzhuo, Niu Yushan, Fang Chunzi, Gu Xuanhui, Shi Zhongzhi, Lu Zhe, Shen Mingdao, Feng Yongming, Gong Yanrong, You Lin, Hui Jingyun, Zhu Jielin, Zhu Lianxiang, Zhu Dechang, Wu Zengrong, Yi Zhongyi, Liu Guangyu, Liu Wenju, Liu Guiqin, Liu Haitao, An Zhendong, Xu Zhongren, Sun Piwen, Sun Yongliang, Sun Jiading, Sun Weiben, Sun Puxuan, Sun Dezhi, Ji Hanwen, Cang Xiuzhi, Su Zaixing, Li Yuzhi, Li Jinchun, Li Shucheng, Li Qiuyan Li Genshen, Li Yan, Li Xiyin, Li De, Li Degui, Yang Jiuli, Yang Ziyin, Yang Zhaohui, Yang Shouwen, Yang Yingliu, Yang Guojun, Yang Shuzhen, Yang Jingsu, Wu Yingshu, Wu Mei, Wu Dinghe, Wu Zhiyong, Qiu Qing, He Shoulun, He Shulan, Shen Cuihua, Song Tianhu, Song Yufen, Chi Jianfu, Chi Haibin, Zhang Jiurong, Zhang Xinyuan, Zhang Yujie, Zhang Zhengqing, Zhang Lixian, Zhang Chunjuan, Zhang Xuwu, Lu Yansun, Chen Zhanyuan, Chen Guoxing, Chen Shuxian, Chen Yuqiao, Shao Hongda, Shao Qihui, Ji Yunxiang, Jin Yuchun, Zhou Changji, Zhou Zhanao, Zhou Xiang, Zheng Longhui, Shan Rongfan, Zhao Guoliang, Zhao Xiaoxia, Zhao Peixing, Zhao DehongDuan Yawen, Hong Bokeng, Mo Wenjun, Suo Changyou, Gu Shouxin, Qian Dihua, Ni Zhirong, Xu Shoushan, Xu Liang, Xu Guomin, Gao Hongyan, Gao Mingsan, Gao Zhenyuan, Guo Daben, Guo Zhishen, Guo Jianyu, Chang Baoquan, Liang Yisheng, Liang Fengying, Liang Tong, Liang Hexian, Wei Jianxing, Tu Yourui, Han Guozhu, Ji Hanxiong, Cheng Jun, Xie Yong, Dou Ruixia, Cai Wencheng, Teng Zhaoxiang, Yi He | | |
| 1998 | 9th | Ding Naijin, Yu Wanling, Ma Chengguo, Ma Jun, Ma Shuqin, Ma De, Wang Zhifu, Wang Yulin, Wang Zhibin, Wang Lianzheng, Wang Liangchen, Wang Guoxue, Wang Chunmei, Wang Guiwen, Wang Tao, You Jianhong (Hezhe), Fang Chunzi (Korean), Gan Ziyu, Gu Xuanhui, Tian Fengshan, Tian Yushi, Feng Yongming, Park Won-kyu (Korean), Zhu Zhongzhi (Korean), Zhu Huiyun, Wu Zengrong, Liu Shiying (Hui), Liu Liqiu (Manchu), Liu Haisheng, Sun Piwen, Sun Yongchun, Sun Guihua, Sun Weiben, Sun Puxuan, Sun Kuiwen, Su Zaixing, Su Yanxia, Du Xianzong, Li Yuzhi, Li Dongchun (Korean), Li Shutian, Li Qinglin, Yang Shiqin, Yang Xin, Yang Xijun, Wu Qingyan, Wu Jiekai (Manchu), Wu Nanjun (Korean), He Xiaochun (Daur) He Shulan, Shen Genrong, Song Yadong, Song Shouqin, Song Fatang, Song Enhua, Song Shuxiang, Chi Susheng, Chi Haibin, Zhang Chi, Zhang Liansheng, Zhang Shuping, Zhang Hongtian, Zhang Ju, Zhang Xuwu, Lu Yansun, Shao Hongda, Fan Guangju, Ouyang Yin, Shang Xianli, Jin Kening, Zhou Yuansheng (Hui), Zhou Shichang, Zhou Youcai, Shan Rongfan, Meng Guangsui, Zhao Jinchun (Manchu), Zhao Xueli, Zhao Guiying (Manchu), Duan Changsheng, Wen Xueyou, Jiang Yidong, Jiang Jie, Jiang Hongbin, He Rongfang, Qin Yuhai, Qin Chijiang, Yuan Xiaodai, Jia Shaoji, Jia Shuer, Xu Youfang, Xu Zhenhu, Xu Fuhe, Yin Xiumei, Gao Hongyan, Gao Mingsan, Saren Gaowa (Mongolian), Cao Guangliang, Sheng Zuhong,Singing by Jiang Hua, Yan Shuzhong, Wei Jianxing, Dong Shiming, Han Guizhi, Xie Yong, and Huo Yunxia | | |
| 2003 | 10th | Yu Shayan (female), Ma Chengguo, Ma Zhiguo, Ma Xiaolin, Ma Shujie (female), Wang Donghua, Wang Weiguang, Wang Jian, Wang Zuoshu, Wang Liangchen, Wang Zhonglin, Wang Zongzhang, Wang Chunmei (female), Wang Shuguo, Wang Shuqing, Wang Zhenshan, Wang Guilan (female), Wang Diangui, Wang Desheng, You Quanxi, You Jianhong (female, Hezhe), Deng Hua, Shi Zhongxin (Hui), Fu Huiting, Fu Mingyu (female, Xibe), Feng Yongming, Lü Weifeng, Qiao Hongtao, Wu Zengrong (female), Ren Wandong, Liu Shiying (Hui), Liu Donghui, Liu Cunzhou, Liu Anli (female), Liu Liqiu (female, Manchu), Guan Qingbo (Manchu), Guan Lixia (female, Oroqen), Guan Siwei (Manchu), Xu Yuanming, Sun Shengchang (Manchu), Sun Yuqing, Sun Guihua (female), Sun Weiben, Sun Pu Xuan, Sun Kuiwen, Su Yanxia (female), Du Shanyi, Li Congjun, Li Yanzhi (female), Li Jichun, Yang Guang, Yang Xin, Xiao Jianchun, Wu Qingyan, Wu Wei (Manchu), He Hongda, He Shulan (female), Wo Lingsheng (Daur), Shen Genrong, Song Fatang, Song Qinghui, Chi Susheng (female), Zhang Shaojie, Zhang Wenxue, Zhang Wenshu, Zhang Jinyun, Zhang Liansheng, Zhang Hongyu, Zhang Zhengying, Zhang Qiuyang, Zhang Yanqi, Zhou Youcai, Zheng Gongcheng, Zheng Chunlin (female, Korean), Shan Rongfan, Meng Guangsui, Zhao Jinchun (Manchu), Zhao Xueli, Hu Yougui, Jiang Hongbin, Naren Hua (female, Mongolian), Qin Chijiang, Geng Lei, Xu Fa, Xu Youfang, Xu Xiuyu (female), Xu Yandong, Yin Xiumei (female), Gao Hongyan (female), Gao Xiang, Tang Xiuting, Chang Jianghua, Cui Longji(Korean ethnicity), Cui Xuewen, Gai Ruyin, Han Qide, Yu Baocai, Zeng Yukang, Xie Boyang, Tan Zhijuan (female), De Aiqin (female, Daur ethnicity), Teng Xikui | | |
| 2008 | 11th | Ma Guiqin (female), Ma Shujie (female), Wang Donghua, Wang Zhaoli, Wang Zuoshu, Wang Xin, Wang Bo (female), Wang Baoliang, Wang Zongzhang, Wang Shuguo, Wang Honglie, Wang Yanbin (female), Wang Diangui, You Quanxi, Fang Tonghua, Shi Zhongxin (Hui), Shi Jiaxing (Manchu), Long Xinnan, Feng Yan (female), Pu Guangzhong (Korean), Zhu Qingwen, Ren Jishan, Liu Shiying (Hui), Liu Donghui, Liu Gang (Hui), Liu Qingquan, Liu Lei (female, Hezhe), Guan Yanbin (Manchu), An Fuqing, Xu Zhaojun, Na Hui (female, Manchu), Sun Guihua (female), Sun Guiling (female), Sun Weiben, Sun Puxuan, Su Yanxia (female), Du Jiming, Du Shanyi, Li Bengong, Li Hua (female), Li Qingchang, Li Zhongjun, Li Meilan (female, Korean), Li Haitao, Li Jichun, Li Shu Xiang (female), Li Xinmin, Yang Tianfu, Yang Guanghong, Yang Jigang, Yang Bin, Wu Qingyan, Song Xibin, Song Fatang, Chi Susheng (female), Zhang Chengyi, Zhang Yang, Zhang Shaoji, Zhang Yanqi, Zhang Hongbiao, Zhang Xianjun, Zhang Xiaolian, Zhang Yaying (female), Zhang Jingchuan, Chen Shutao (Manchu), Chen Hesheng, Chen Xueping (Manchu), Chen Chenggui, Lin Xiufang (female, Manchu), Shang Qinglian (female), Luo Wenxiao, Yue Guojun, Zhou Yuhuan (female), Zhou Yongkang, Zhou Youcai, Zhou Tongzhan, Zhou Fengmin, Zheng Gongcheng, Shan Zengqing, Zhao Zhixiang, Nan Ying, Jiang Wei, Jiang Linkui, Jiang Hongbin, Naren Hua (female, Mongolian), Li Zhanshu, Qian Yunlu, Xu Xiuyu (female), Xu Zhenlin, Xu Weizhong, Yin Xiumei (female), Gao Xiang, Tang Xiuting, Zhan Yunting, Cao Shujie (female), Cui Longji (Korean)Zhang Baijia, Sui Fengfu, Sui Ximing, Han Xuejian, Tan Zhijuan (female), Teng Xikui | | |
| 2013 | 12th | Wang Yueqing (female), Wang Donghua, Wang Dongguang, Wang Qingjiang, Wang Limei (female), Wang Zuoshu, Wang Jinhui, Wang Bo (female), Wang Shuguo, Wang Jin, Wang Xiankui, Wang Jinghai, Wang Ying (female), Wang Diangui, Fang Tonghua, Fu Huating, Feng Yan (female), Ji Bingxuan, Park Kwang-jong (Korean), ~~Zhu Deyi~~, Liu Donghui, Liu Guozhong, Liu Lei (female, Hezhe), Guan Yanbin (Manchu), Na Hui (female, Manchu), Sun Zhe, Sun Bin, Su Yanxia (female), Li Yalan (female), Li Yanzhi (female), Li Qinghe, Li Zhongjun, ~~Li Zelin~~, Li Yong, Li Haitao, Li Peizhong, Yang Tianfu, Yang Xiaoyi, Yang Zhen, Song Xibin, Zhang Rihong (female, Korean), Zhang Sheng, Zhang Yaying (female), Zhang Zhixiang, Zhang Boli, Zhang Shuyuan, Zhang Yupu (Hui) Zhang Baowen, Zhang Enliang (Manchu), Lu Biao, Chen Shutao (Manchu), Wu Fengcheng, Lin Kuanhai, Yi Lianjun (female), Luo Tao, Yue Guojun, Zhou Yuhuan (female), Zhou Youcai, Zheng Gongcheng, ~~Shan Zengqing~~, Meng Jianzhu, Zhao Shaohua (female, Manchu), Zhao Jun, Zhao Ge, Zhao Min (female), Jiang Wanchun, Fei Yuling (female), Xia Lihua (female), Xia Xiangqing, Xu Ming, Xu Zezhou, Yin Xiumei (female), Gao Guangsheng, Gao Yong, Gao Zhijie, Gao Huan (female), Gao Chunyan (female), Guo Xinshuang, Mei Zhangji (Manchu), Cui Longji (Korean), Fu Fengchun (female), ~~Gai Ruyin~~, ~~Sui~~ Fengfu, Sui Ximing, Dong Peiyong, Dong Hui (Mongolian), Han Dongyan, Han Lihua, Jiao Yun, Chu Yanfang (female), Jing Bo, Tan Zhijuan (female), Zhai Youcai | | |
| 2018 | 13th | ~~Yu Fei~~Ma Xu (Manchu), Ma Qinghui (female), Feng Xiaomin (female), Wang Shoucong, Wang Jun, Wang Jinxi, Wang Jinhui, Wang Qiushi, Wang Xiankui, ~~Wang Changsong~~, Fang ~~Tonghua~~, Gan Rongkun, Shi Shitai, Shi Jiaxing (Manchu), Tian Likun, Bai Yaqin (female)~~Feng Yan~~(Female), Wu Hui (female), Liu Jie, Liu Hailing (female), Liu Lei (female, Hezhe), Sun Yufei (female), Sun Yanling (female, Manchu), Sun Zhe, Sun Bin, Li Dayi, Li Yugang, Li Yonglai, Li Yalan (female), Li Kun, Li Jianqiang, Li Zhenguo, Li Haitao, Li Yin, Yang Jing (1963) (female, Hui), Yang Zhen, He Xin, Leng Youbin, Song Hongwei, Song Bo, Zhang Zilin, Zhang Jun, Zhang Qingwei, Zhang Zhixiang, Zhang Yupu (Hui), Zhang Haiying (female), Zhang Jiawen (Mongolian), Zhang Changrong, Zhang Jinghua (female), Zhang Bin, Zhang Hui (female, Oroqen), Lu Hao, Chen Zuodong, Chen Shutao (Manchu), Chen Xiwen, Miao Xiu (female), Yue Guojun, Jin Donghao (Korean), Zhou Yu, Zheng Gongcheng, Zhao Wenlong, Zhao Leji, Zhao Ming (Manchu), Hu Yafeng, Hu Jiang, Jia Dafeng, Jia Hongtao, Jia Jun, Xu Xianshu (female, Korean), Xu Shaoshi, Xu Jianguo, Gao Yong, Gao Xiangqiu (female), Gao Yan, Gao Chunyan (female), Gao Jiming, Guo Chengyu (female), Cao Yongming (female), Kang Zhijun, Dong Wenqin (female), Han Ku, Han Zhendong, Jiao Yun, Xie Baolu, Bao Wenbo, Jing Bo, Tan Lin (female), ~~Zhai Youcai~~, Zhai Qingbin, Ju Xiuqin (female), Wei Chun (female). | | |
| 2023 | 14th | Yu Hongtao, Yu Yang, Yu Jia'ao, Ma Liqun, Ma Bing, Ma Jianguo, Wang Hesheng, Wang Xingzhu, Wang Lan, Wang Junfeng, Wang Xiaohong, Wang Hai, Cong Li, Xing Yuntang, Xing Tongda, Lü Dongfang, Lü Wei, Zhu Xueliang, Qiao Wenzhi, Ren Ziwei, Ren Shuyuan, Liu Yongzhi, Liu Hailing, Liu Lei, Xu Xiaolin, Xu Qin, Sun Chengkun, Sun Zhe, Sun Bin, Li Guangli, Li Yunfeng, Li Ning, Li Yansong, Li Yin, Yang Huijun, Wu Qingzhi, Wu Zhenglong, Tong Xiulian, Gu Zhenchun, Leng Youbin Shen Hongyu, Zhang Yazhong, Zhang Shougang, Zhang Guojun, Zhang Xue, Zhang Shihui, Zhang Qixiang, Zhang He, Lu Xiaolin, Chen Wenqing, Chen Yuhui, Chen Liangyong, Chen Yujia, Fan Qinghua, Lin Feng, Ji Fusui, Jin Donghao, Zhou Xiaolong, Meng Xianghui, Zhao Rongguo, Gong Zhenjiang, Nie Shoujun, Jia Yumei, Jia Xiaoliang, Jia Yun, Dang Guangsuo, Qian Qian, Gao Xiangqiu, Gao Chunyan, Guo Hongwei, Liang Daihua, Liang Huiling, Dong Wenqin, Han Jiecai, Han Xuesong, Fu Ziying, Jiao Yun, Lu Haiwei, Xie Yancui | 84 | |
