= Meng Nan =

- Born: Heilongjiang, China
- Origin: Guangzhou, China
- Genres: Pop, R&B
- Occupation(s): Singer, songwriter
- Instrument: Vocals
- Years active: 2009–present
- Labels: Universal

Meng Nan (Chinese: 孟楠; pinyin: Meng Nan) is a Chinese singer-songwriter based in Guangzhou, People's Republic of China. Meng Nan is currently signed to Universal Records and has recently released her second album. Meng Nan came to prominence after independently releasing her first album, titled 'I only have me' and after receiving an award for best new artist at a music award ceremony hosted by DongFang Television, she was soon signed to Star Max, a Chinese-based management company.
