= Datudingzi Mountain =

Mountain in Heilongjiang, China

Highest point
- Elevation: 1,690 m (5,540 ft)
- Coordinates: 44.5014751°N 128.2364024°E

Geography
- Location: Harbin, Heilongjiang

Datudingzi Mountain or Datudingzi Shan (simplified Chinese: 大秃顶子山; traditional Chinese: 大禿頂子山; pinyin: Dà tūdǐng zi shān), also known as Mount Datudingzi, abbreviated as "Mt. Datudingzi", is the highest point of Heilongjiang province, located about 170 kilometers southeast of Wuchang County, Harbin City, Heilongjiang Province.

Datudingzi Mountain is one of the peaks in Zhangguangcai Range (张广才岭), and is also the highest mountain in Heilongjiang Province, with the main peak of 1690 meters above sea level.

== Natural geography ==
Datudingzi Mountain is located on the southeast slope of the Zhangguangcai Range. The plant growing period in this area is 120 to 140 days, the annual precipitation is 500 to 1,000 millimetres (20 to 39 in), the average annual temperature is 2.7 °C or 36.9 °F, and the snow accumulation period in winter is 130-150 days.
