= Siberian Tiger Park =

- Hā'ěrbīn Xībólìyǎ Lǎohǔ Gōngyuán (Chinese: 哈尔滨西伯利亚老虎公园); Hēilóngjiāng Āmù'ěr Hǔ Yuán (Chinese: 黑龙江阿穆尔虎园); Dōngběi Hǔ Lín Yuán (Chinese: 东北虎林园)
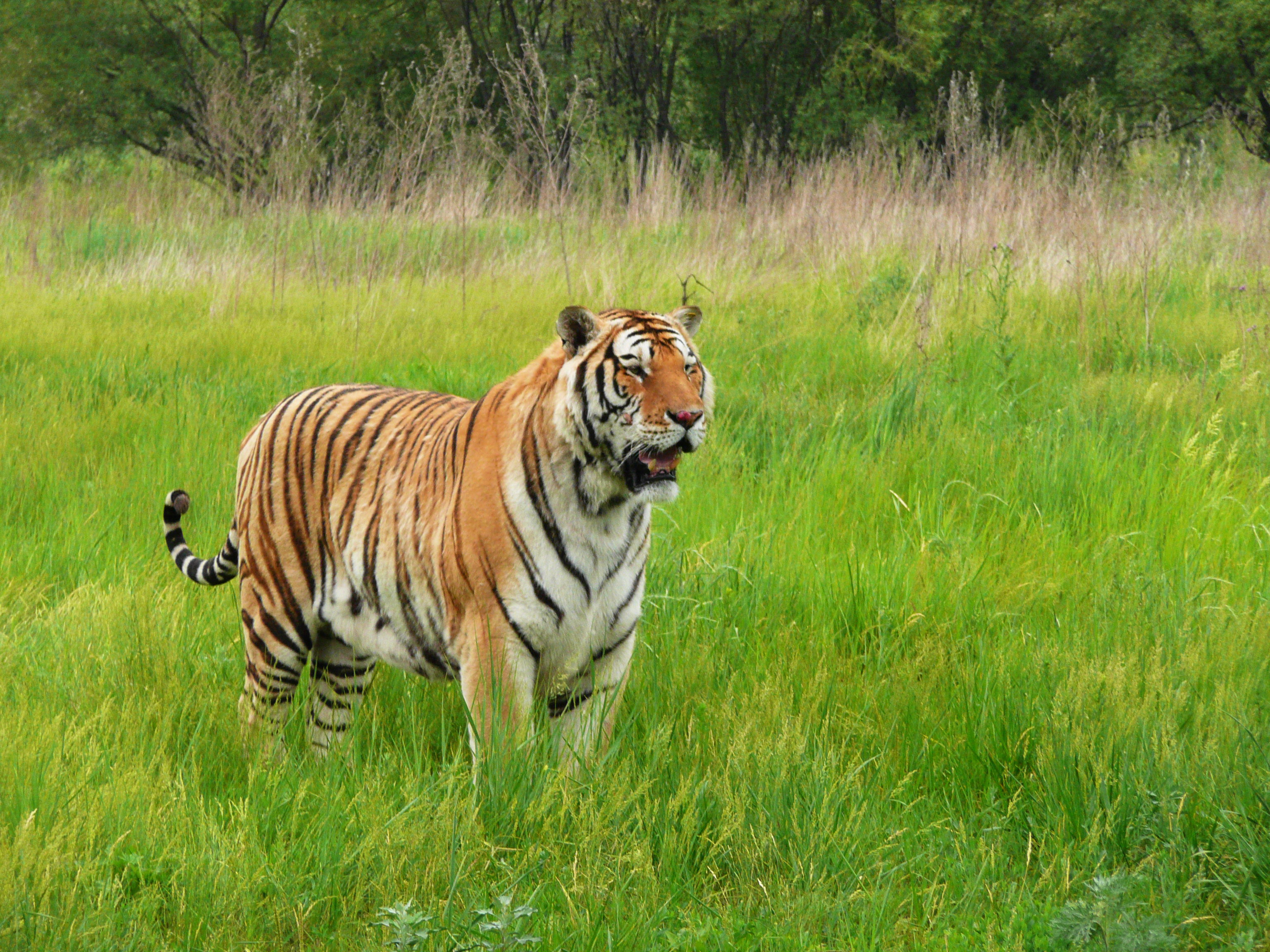
- A Siberian tiger at the park
- Interactive map of Siberian Tiger Park
- Location: Harbin, Heilongjiang, China
- Website: www.dongbeihulinyuan.com

The Siberian Tiger Park (Chinese: 东北虎林园) is a zoological park in Harbin, Heilongjiang, Northeast China. It hosts, amongst other animals, the Siberian tiger.

== See also ==
- Siberian Tiger Introduction Project
