= Diaoshuilou Falls =

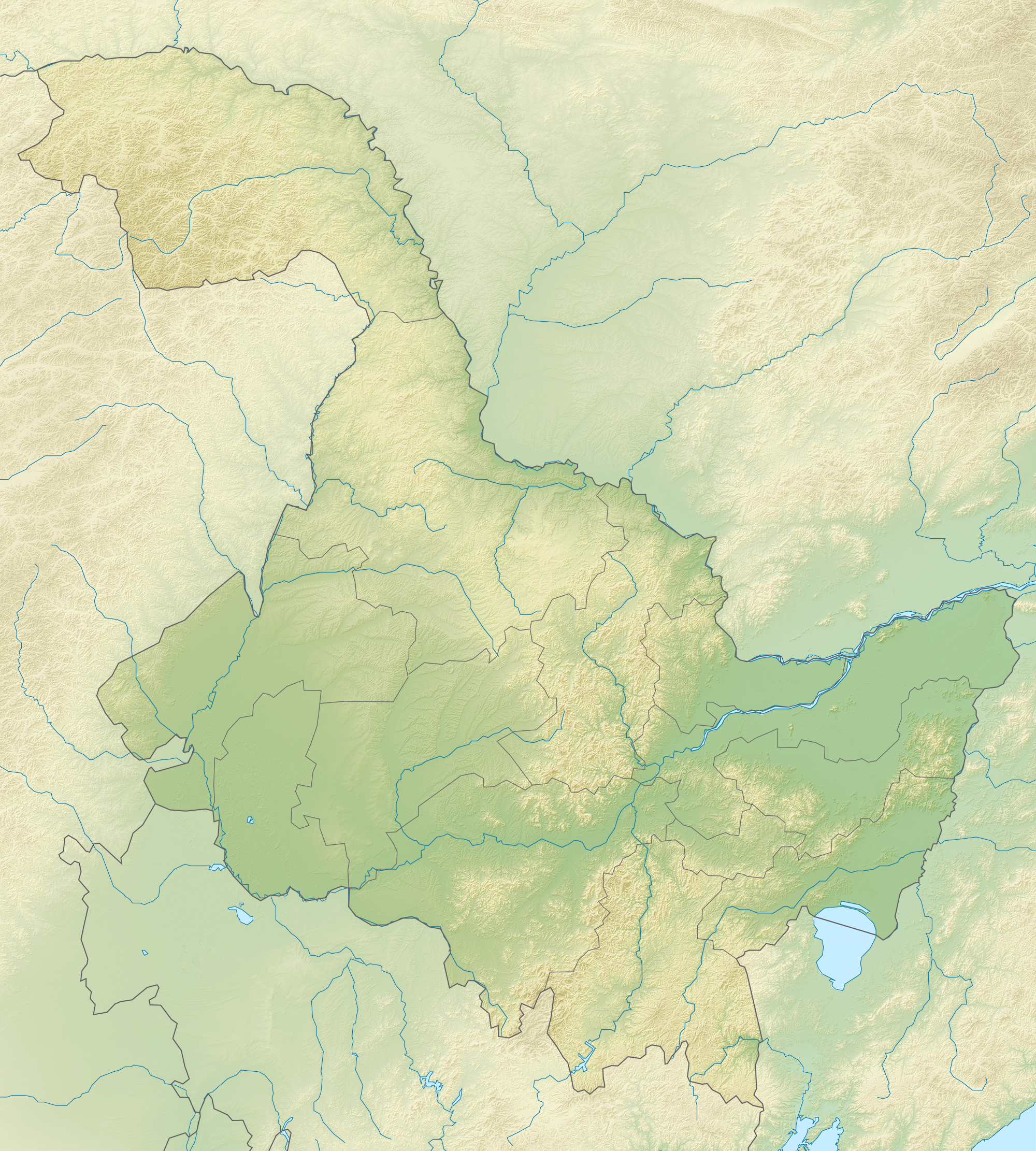
- Location within Heilongjiang Location within China
- Coordinates: 44°03′16.6″N 128°56′31.7″E
- Total height: 20 metres (66 ft)
- Total width: 40 metres (130 ft)
- Run: Mudan River

The Diaoshuilou Falls (Chinese: 吊水楼瀑布; pinyin: Diàoshuǐlóu Pùbù) are a 40-metre (130 ft) wide waterfall in Heilongjiang Province, People's Republic of China at the northern end of Lake Jingpo. The cascade is at its most impressive during the wetter summer months whilst in winter it freezes into a curtain of ice.
