= Zhangguangcai Range =

Mountain range in China

Coordinates: 44.5139°N 128.25°E

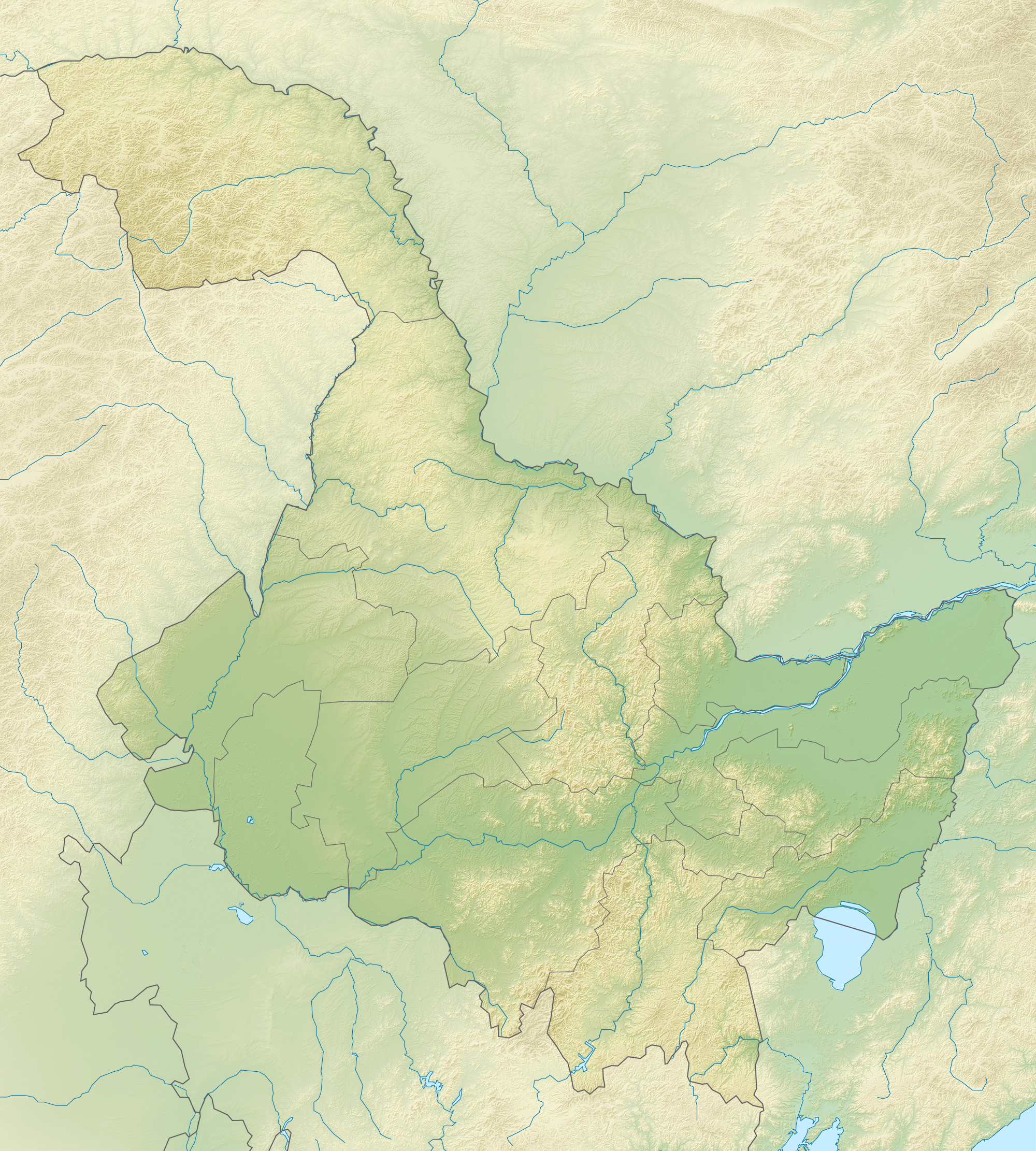
- Location within Heilongjiang Location within China

Highest point
- Elevation: 1,760 m (5,770 ft)

Geography
- Location: Heilongjiang

Zhangguangcai Range or Zhangguangcai Ling (simplified Chinese: 张广才岭; traditional Chinese: 張廣才嶺; pinyin: Zhāngguǎngcái lǐng), also known as Zhangguangcai Ridge or Zhangguang Cailing, is a mountain range located in the central part of the northern section of the mountains in Northeastern China, mostly in the territory of Heilongjiang Province, reaching southward to the northern part of Dunhua City, Jilin Province.

Zhangguangcai Range is divided into two branches, the west of the Jiaohe Basin (蛟河盆地) is the Xilaoye Range (西老爷岭), and the east of the Jiaohe Basin is the Weihu Range (威虎岭).

== Geographic location ==
Zhangguangcai Range runs northeast–southwest, with an average altitude of more than 800 meters, and the main peak, Laotudingzi Mountain (老秃顶子山), is 1,686.9 meters high.
