= Heilongjiang =

Province of China

Heilongjiang 黑龙江
- Province
- Province of Heilongjiang

Chinese transcription(s)
  - Simplified Chinese: 黑龙江省
  - Hanyu pinyin: Hēilóngjiāng Shěng
  - Abbreviation: HL / 黑 (Hēi)
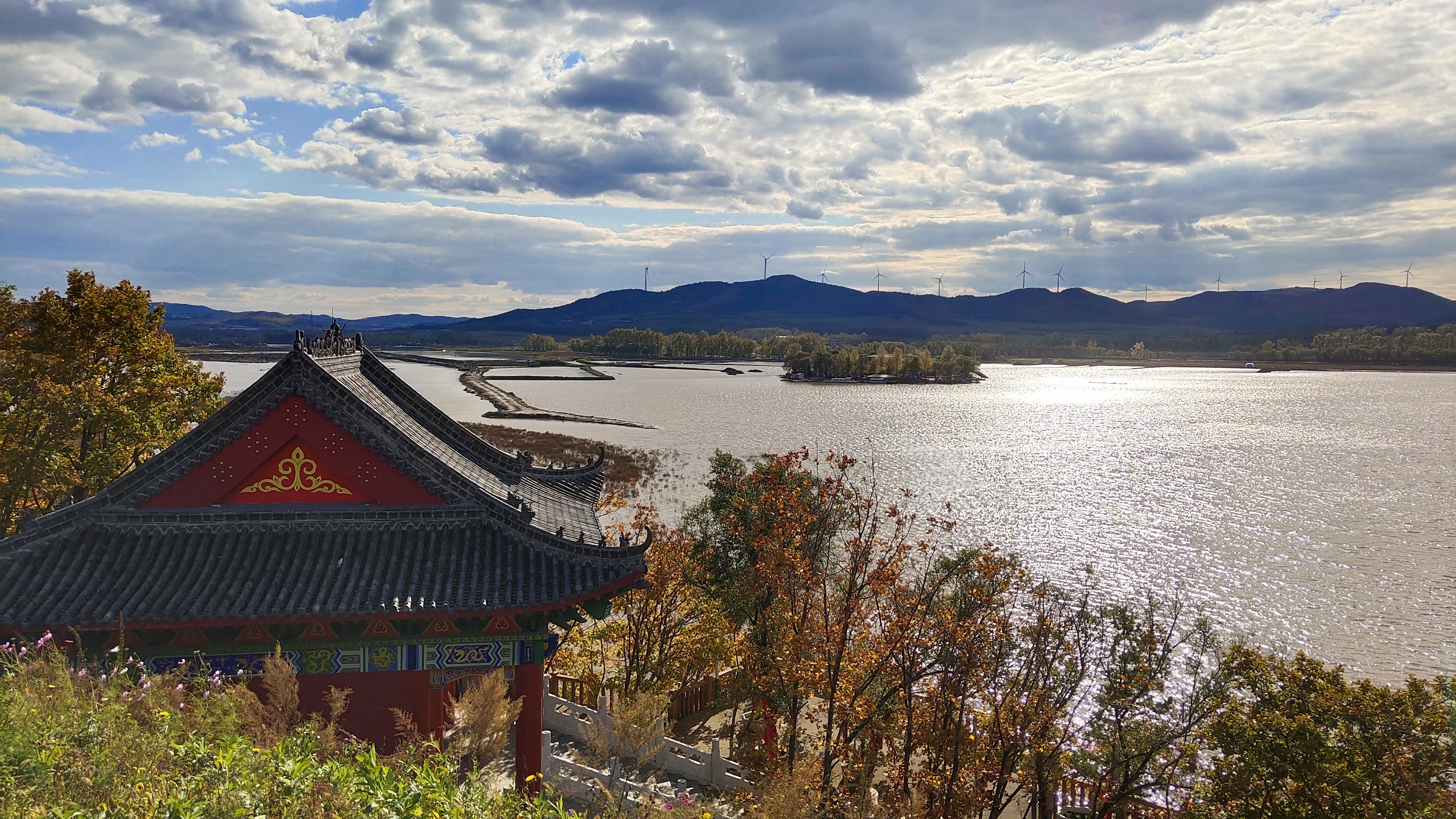
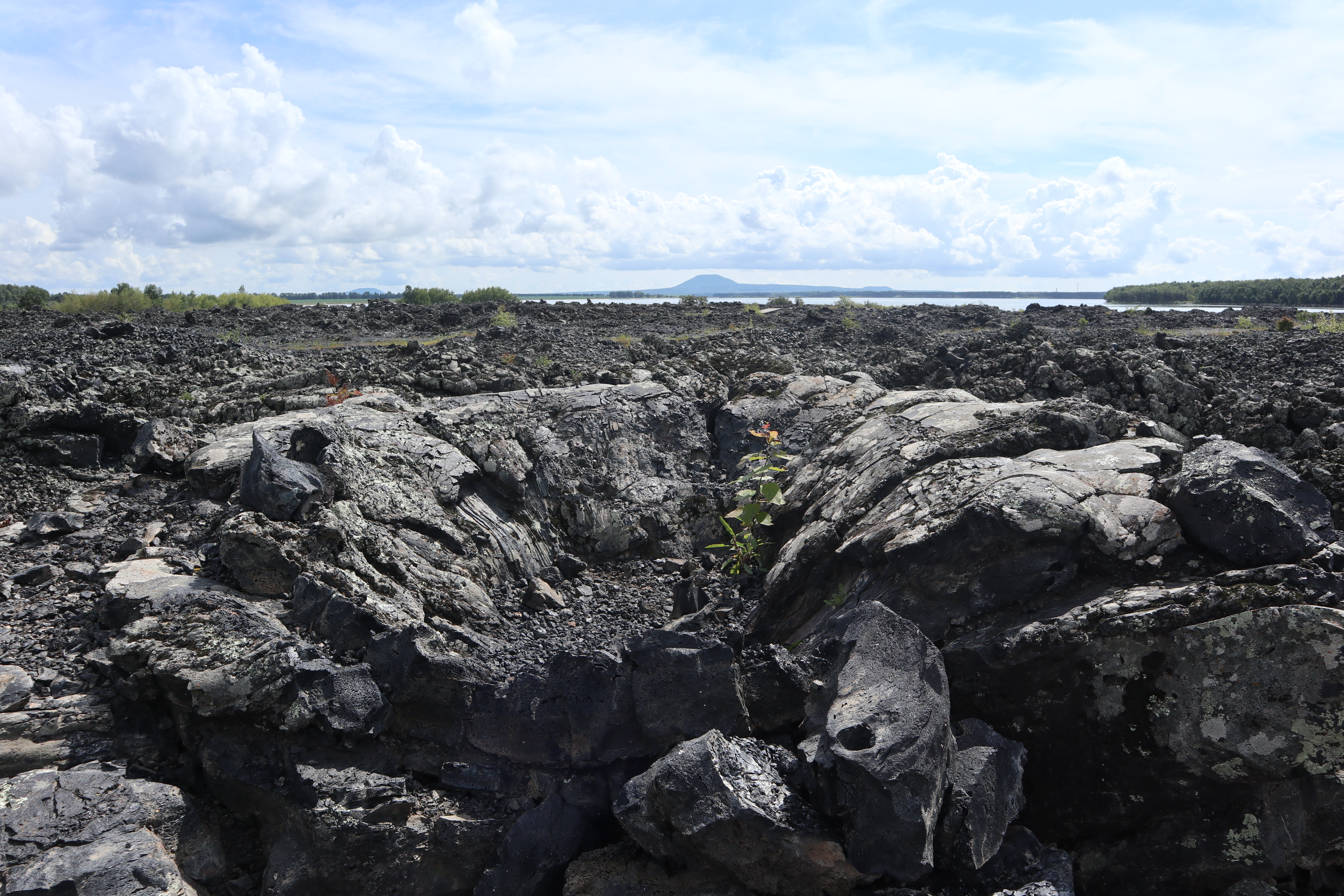
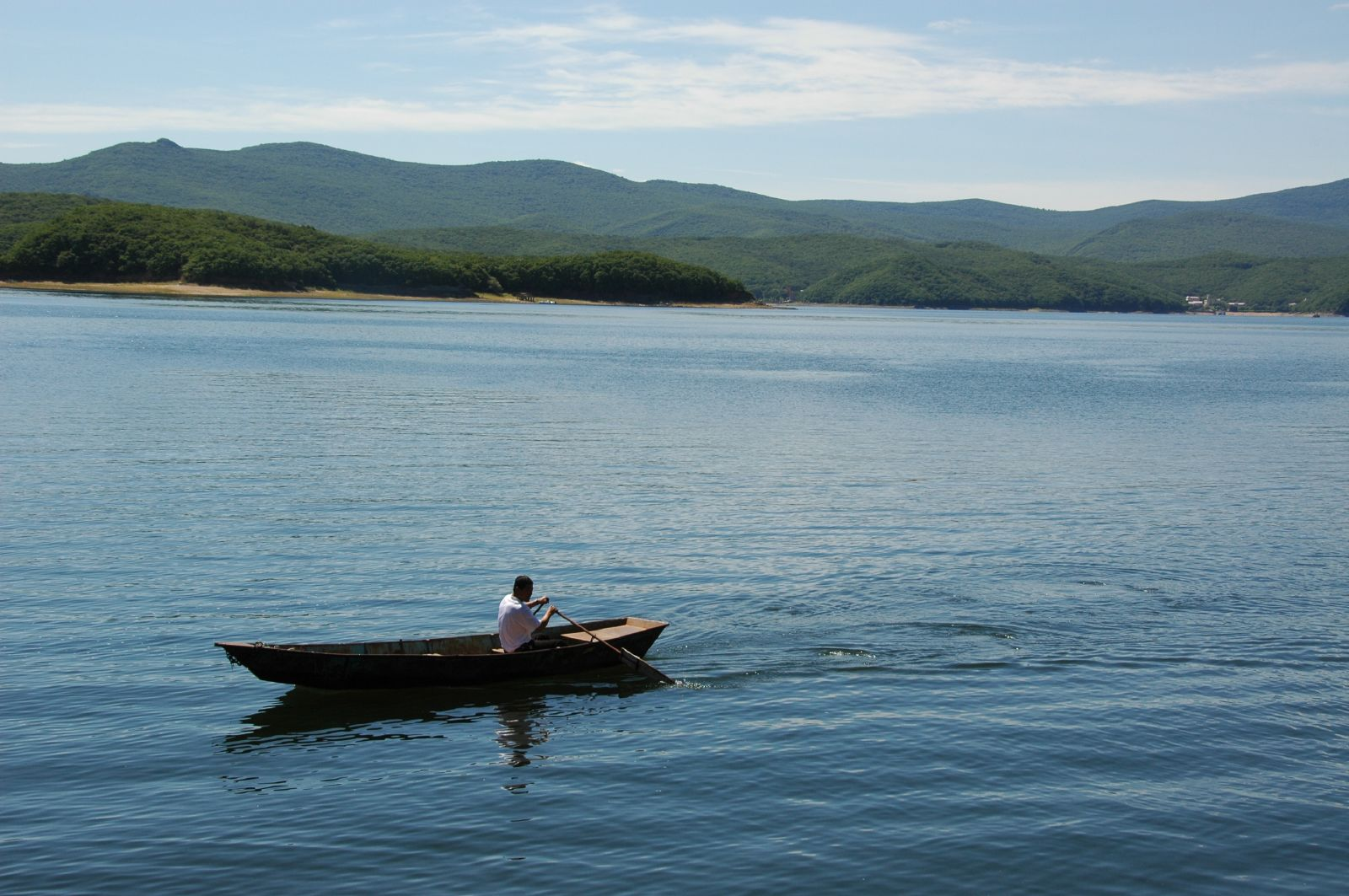
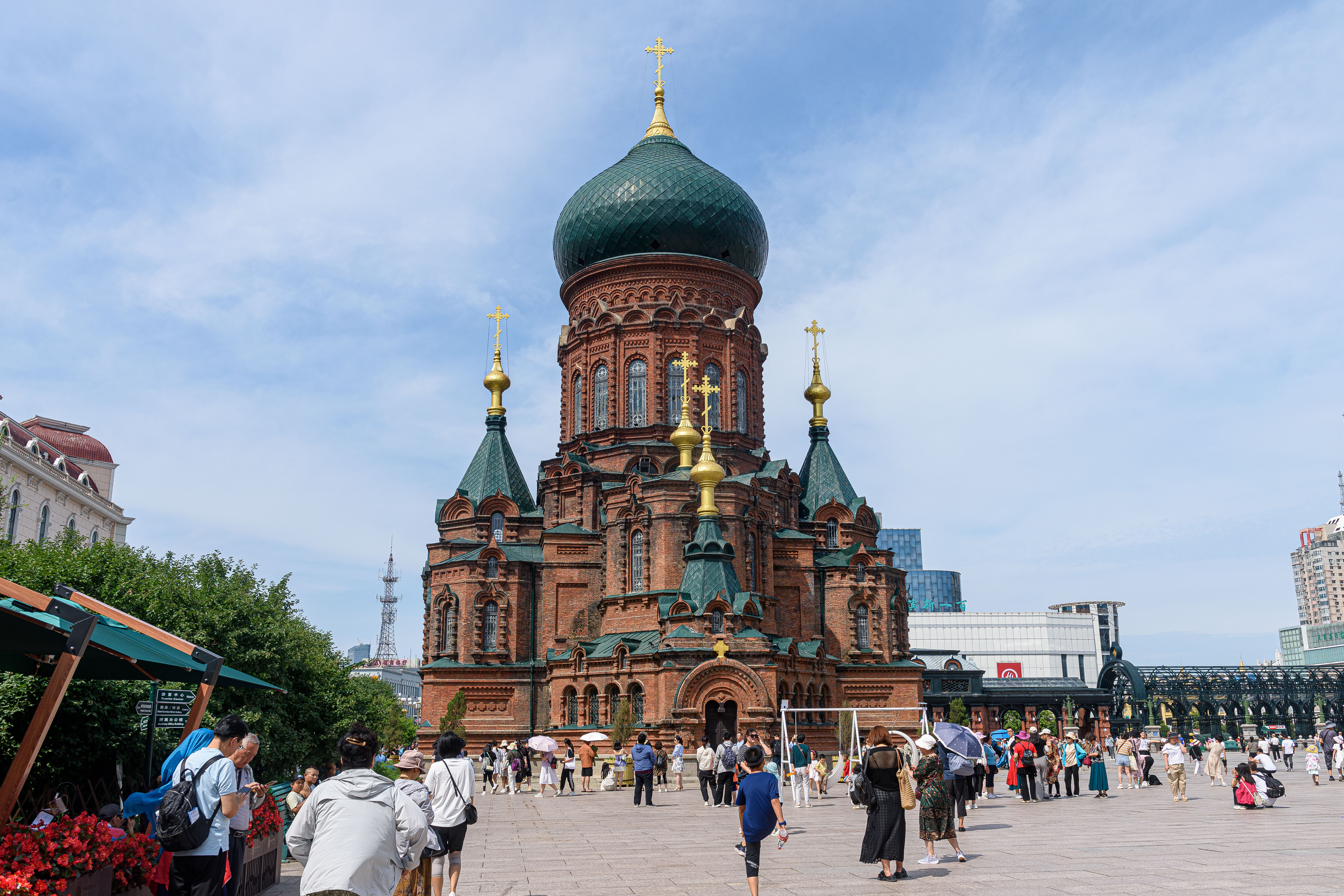
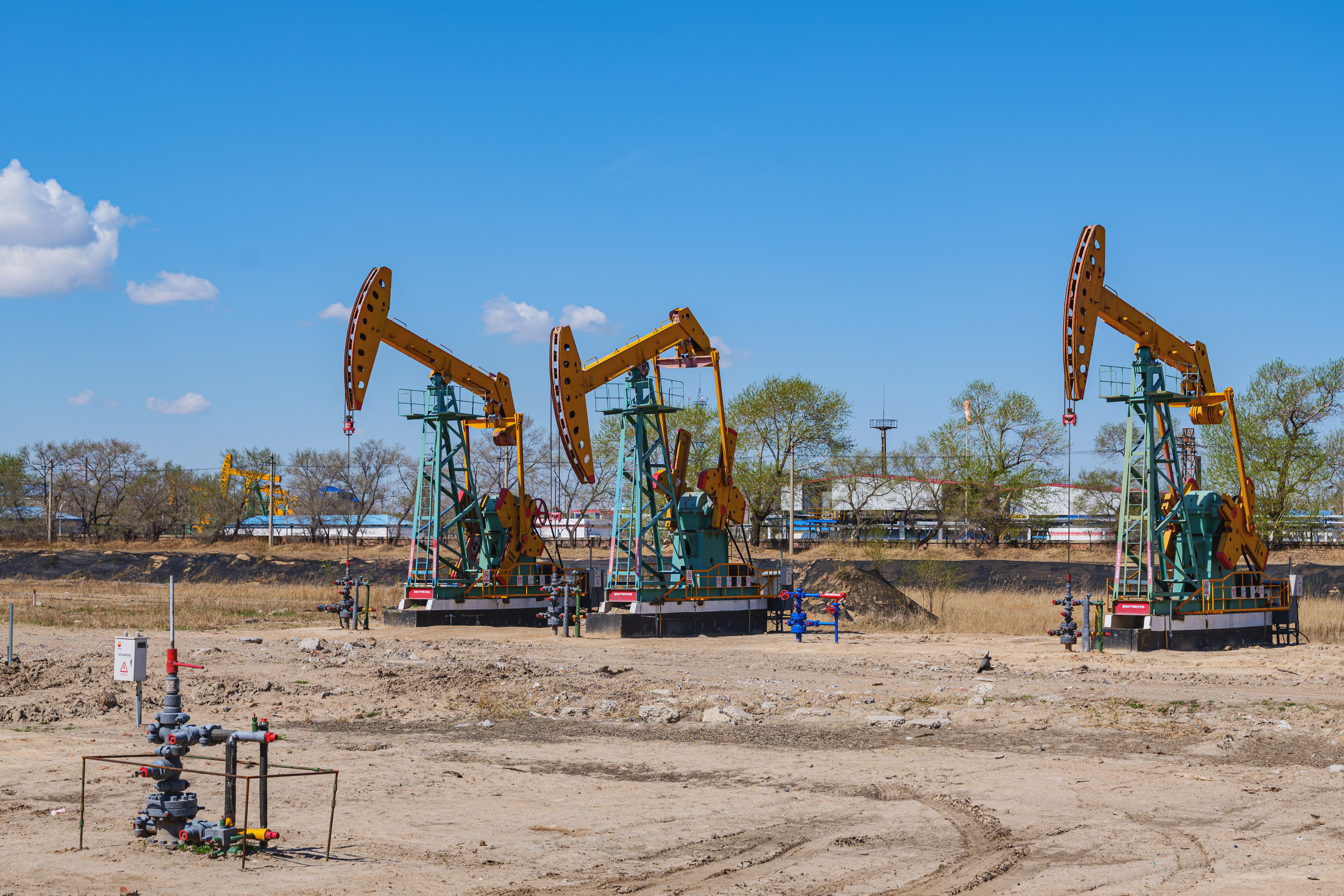
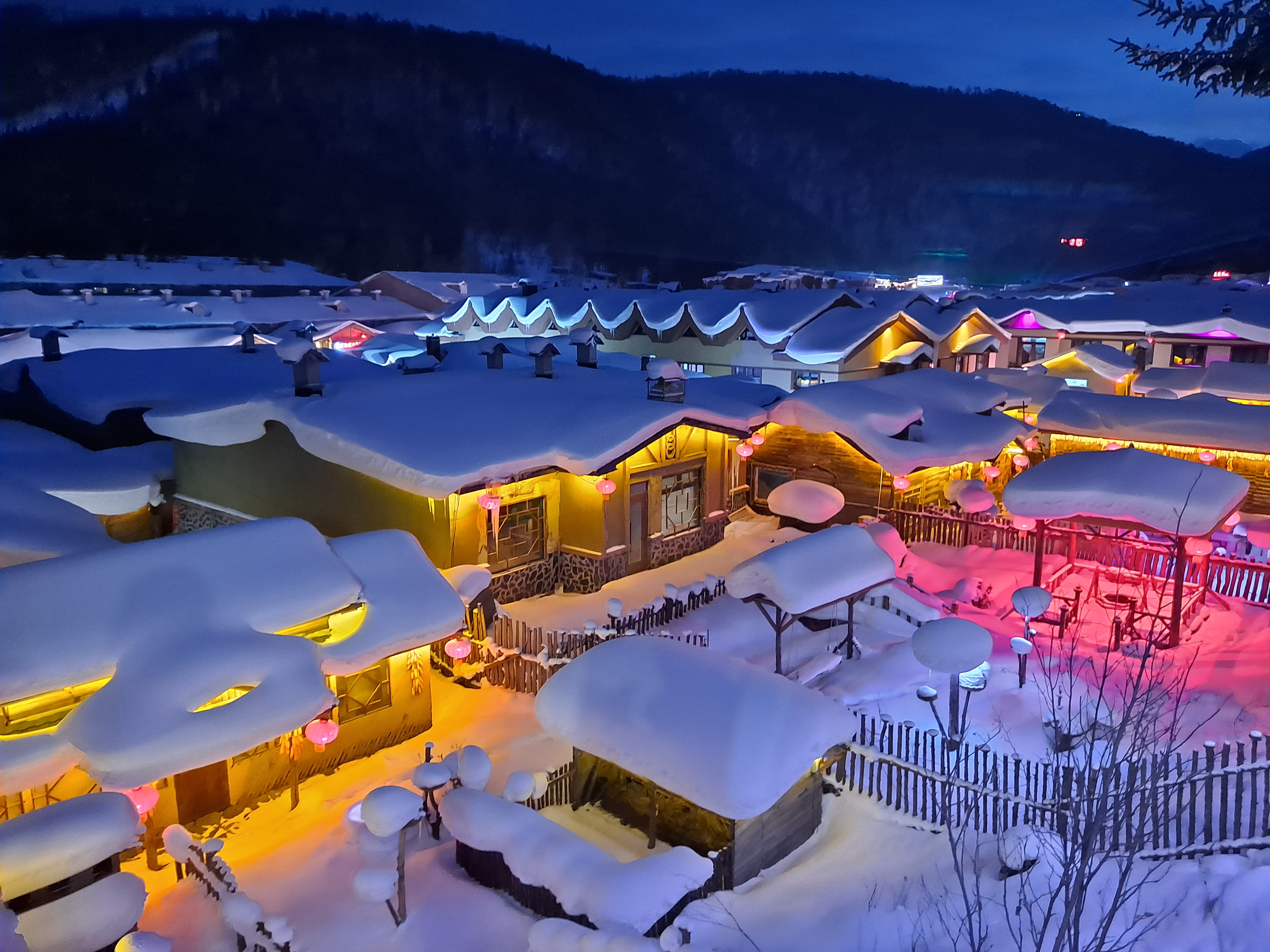
- Jiamusi Wudalianchi volcanic field Jingpo Lake Saint Sophia Cathedral, Harbin Daqing Oil Field Xuexiang

- Map showing the location of Heilongjiang Province
- Coordinates: 48°N 129°E
- Country: China
- Named for: 黑 hēi—black 龙 lóng—dragon 江 jiāng—river Amur river
- Capital (and largest city): Harbin
- Divisions: 13 prefectures, 130 counties, 1274 townships

Government
  - Type: Province
  - Body: Heilongjiang Provincial People's Congress
  - Party Secretary: Xu Qin
  - Congress chairman: Xu Qin
  - Governor: Liang Huiling
  - CPPCC chairman: Lan Shaomin
  - National People's Congress Representation: 84 deputies

Area
  - Total: 454,800 km^{2} (175,600 sq mi)
  - Rank: 6th
- Highest elevation (Mt. Datudingzi): 1,690 m (5,540 ft)

Population (2020)
  - Total: 31,850,088
  - Rank: 20th
  - Density: 70.03/km^{2} (181.4/sq mi)
  - Rank: 28th

Demographics
  - Ethnic composition: Han: 95% Manchu: 3% Korean: 1% Mongol: 0.4% Hui: 0.3%
  - Languages and dialects: Northeastern Mandarin, Jilu Mandarin, Jiaoliao Mandarin, Mongolian, Manchu

GDP (2025)
  - Total: CN¥ 1,687,810 billion (25th); US$ 236.3 billion
  - Per capita: CN¥ 55,980 (30th); US$ 7,837
- ISO 3166 code: CN-HL
- HDI (2023): 0.778 (18th) – high
- Website: www.hlj.gov.cn (in Chinese)

Heilongjiang
- "Heilongjiang" in simplified (top) and traditional (bottom) Chinese characters

Chinese name
- Simplified Chinese: 黑龙江
- Traditional Chinese: 黑龍江
- Postal: Heilungkiang
- Literal meaning: "Black Dragon River"
Transcriptions
Standard Mandarin
- Hanyu Pinyin: Hēilóngjiāng
- Bopomofo: ㄏㄟ ㄌㄨㄥˊ ㄐㄧㄤ
- Gwoyeu Romatzyh: Heilongjiang
- Wade–Giles: Hei^{1}-lung^{2}-chiang^{1}
- IPA: [xéɪ.lʊ̌ŋ.tɕjáŋ]
other Mandarin
- Xiao'erjing: حِ‌ِلْوڭِیَانْ
Wu
- Romanization: Ha^{平} lon^{上} kaon^{平}
Yue: Cantonese
- Yale Romanization: Hāak-lùhng-gōng
- Jyutping: Haak^{1}-lung^{4}-gong^{1}
- Hong Kong Romanisation: Hak Lung Kong
- IPA: [hak̚˥.lʊŋ˩.kɔŋ˥]
Southern Min
- Tâi-lô: Hik-lîng-kang

Mongolian name
- Mongolian Cyrillic: Хармөрөн муж
- Mongolian script: ᠬᠠᠷᠠᠮᠦ᠌ᠷᠡᠨ ᠮᠤᠵᠢ
Transcriptions
- SASM/GNC: Qaramörin muǰi

Manchu name
- Manchu script: ᠰᠠᡥᠠᠯᡳᠶᠠᠨ ᡠᠯᠠ ᡤᠣᠯᠣ
- Romanization: Sahaliyan'ula golo

Heilongjiang (Note: /ˌheɪ.lɒŋ.ˈdʒæŋ/; formerly romanized as Heilungkiang) is an inland province in northeast China. It is the northernmost and easternmost province of the country and contains China's northernmost point (in Mohe City along the Amur) and easternmost point (at the confluence of the Amur and Ussuri rivers).

The province is bordered by Jilin to the south and Inner Mongolia to the west. It also shares a border with Russia (Amur Oblast, Jewish Autonomous Oblast, Khabarovsk Krai, Primorsky Krai and Zabaykalsky Krai) to the north and east. The capital and the largest city of the province is Harbin. Among Chinese provincial-level administrative divisions, Heilongjiang is the sixth-largest by total area, the 20th-most populous, and the second-poorest by GDP per capita after only Gansu province.

The province takes its name from the Amur river (in Chinese: Heilong River), which marks the border between the People's Republic of China and Russia.

Heilongjiang has significant agricultural production, and raw materials, such as timber, oil, and coal.

== Etymology ==
The province takes its name from the Amur river, whose name in Mandarin is Heilongjiang ('black dragon river').

== History ==
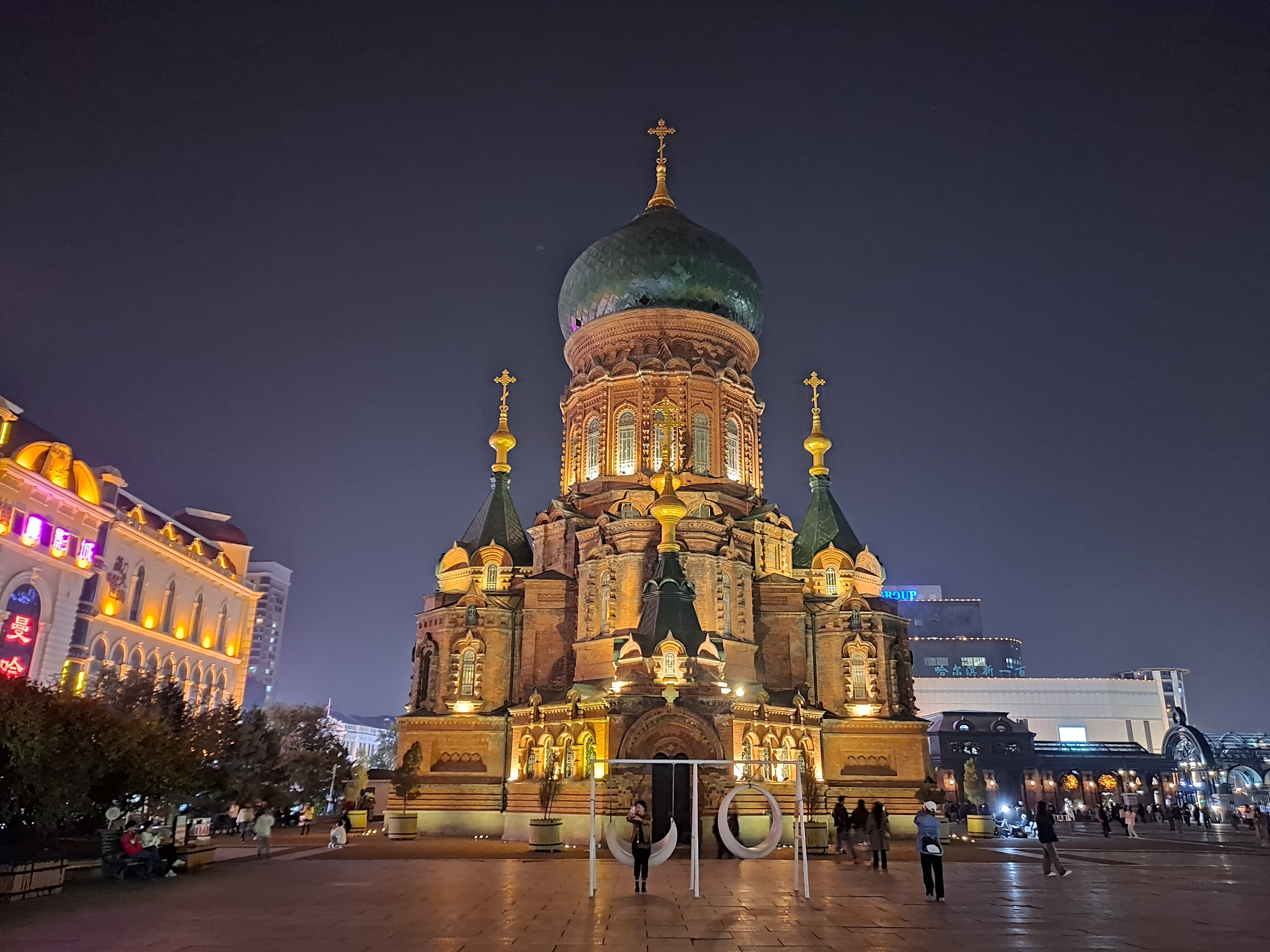
Saint Sofia Church in Harbin

Ancient Chinese records and other sources state that Heilongjiang was inhabited by people such as the Sushen, Buyeo, the Mohe, and the Khitan. Mongolic Donghu people lived in Inner Mongolia and the western part of Heilongjiang. Some names are Manchu or Mongolian. The eastern portion of Heilongjiang was ruled by the Bohai Kingdom between the 7th and 10th centuries, followed by the Khitan Liao dynasty. The Jurchen Jin dynasty (1115–1234) that subsequently ruled much of north China arose within the borders of modern Heilongjiang.

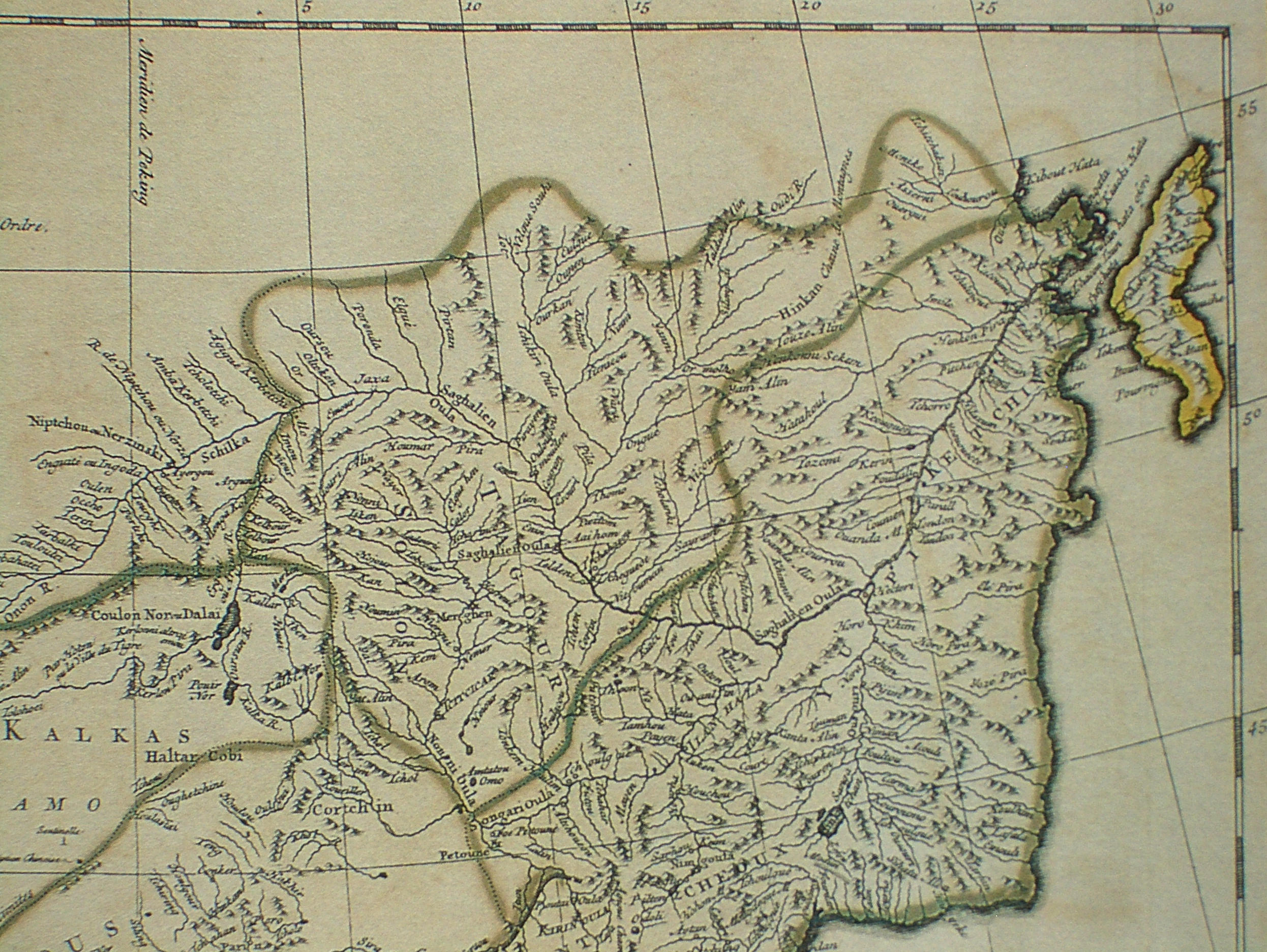
Heilongjiang and Jilin Provinces on a French map dated to 1734

Heilongjiang as an administrative entity was created in 1683, during the Kangxi era of the Manchu Qing dynasty, from the northwestern part of the Jilin province. This Heilongjiang Province only included the western part of today's Heilongjiang Province, and was under the supervision of the General of Heilongjiang (Sahaliyan Ula i Jiyanggiyūn) (the title is also translated as the Military Governor of Heilongjiang; jiyanggiyūn is the Manchu reading of the Chinese word 將軍 jiāngjūn; "military leader, general" and is cognate with Japanese shōgun), whose power extended, according to the Treaty of Nerchinsk, as far north as the Stanovoy Mountains. The eastern part of what's today Heilongjiang remained under the supervision of the General of Jilin (Girin i Jiyanggiyūn), whose power reached the Sea of Japan. These areas deep in Manchuria were closed off to Han Chinese migration.

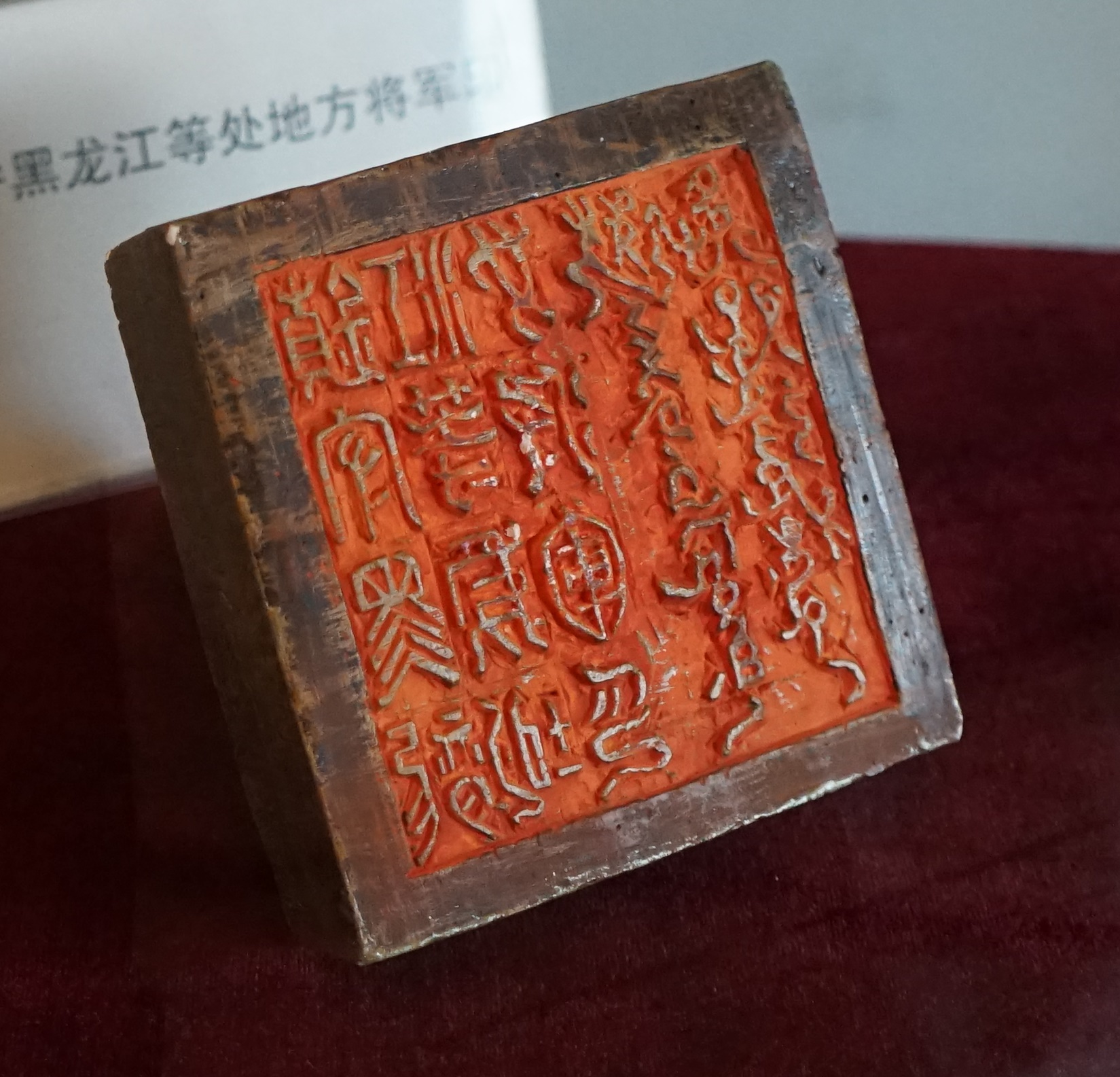
Seal of the Guard General of Heilongjiang at the Heilongjiang General Mansion

The original seat of the Military Governor of Heilongjiang, as established in 1683, was in Heilongjiang City (also known as Aigun or Heihe, or, in Manchu, Saghalien Ula), located on the Amur river. However, already in 1690 the seat of the governor was transferred to Nenjiang (Mergen) on the Nen River, and, in 1699, further south to Qiqihar. According to modern historians, the moves may have been driven by supply considerations: Nenjiang and Qiqihar are connected by a convenient waterway (Nen River) with southern Manchuria, whereas accessing Aigun (Heihe) would require either sailing all the way down the Sungari River until its confluence with the Amur and then up the Amur to Heihe, or using a portage over the Lesser Xing'an Mountains between the Nen River valley and the Amur valley. An additional advantage of Qiqihar may have been its location at the junction of a northbound road (to Nenjiang) and a westbound one (to Mongolia), enabling its garrison to defend both against the Russians and the Ölöt Mongols.

Little Qing Military presence existed north of Aigun. According to the 18th- and early-20th-century European sources and the reports of the Russians in the 1850s, the farthest Qing "advance guard" post was at Ulusu-Modon (Ulussu-Mudan) (Chinese: 乌鲁苏穆丹 Wūlǔsūmùdān), near the Amur river's famous S-shaped meander. (The post was on the left (north) bank of the river, lost to the Russians in 1860.)

In 1858 and 1860, the Qing government was forced to give up all land beyond the Amur and Ussuri rivers to the Russian Empire, cutting off the Qing Empire from the Sea of Japan and giving Heilongjiang its present northern and eastern borders. At the same time, Manchuria was opened to Han Chinese migration by the Qing government. By the early twentieth century, due to the Chuang Guandong, the Han Chinese had become the dominant ethnic group in the region.

In 1931, Japanese forces invaded Heilongjiang. In 1932, the Japanese completed their conquest of the province, which became part of the Japanese puppet state of Manchukuo.

In 1945, Japanese forces in Manchuria were defeated by the Soviet Army. During the Chinese Civil War, Soviet forces aided the Chinese communists. Heilongjiang became the first province to be completely controlled by the communists and Harbin the first major city to be controlled by them.

At the beginning of communist rule, Heilongjiang included only the western portion of the present-day province, and had its capital at Qiqihar. The remaining area was the province of Songjiang; its capital was Harbin. In 1954, these two provinces were merged into present-day Heilongjiang. During the Cultural Revolution, Heilongjiang was also expanded to include Hulunbuir League and some other areas previously in Inner Mongolia; this has since mostly been reversed.

== Geography ==
Heilongjiang is a land of varied topographies. Much of the province is dominated by mountain ranges such as the Greater Khingan Range and Lesser Khingan Range, Zhangguangcai Mountains, Laoye Mountains, and Wanda Mountains. The highest peak is Datudingzi Mountain at 1,690 metres (5,540 ft), located on the border with Jilin province. The Greater Khingan Range contains China's largest remaining virgin forest and is an important area for China's forestry industry.

The east and southwest of the province, which are relatively flat and low in altitude, feature the Muling River, the Naoli River, the Songhua River, the Nen River, and the Mudan River, all tributaries of the Amur, while the northern border forms part of the Amur valley. Xingkai Lake (or Khanka Lake) is found on the border with Russia's Primorsky Krai.

=== Climate ===
Koppen Classification map of Heilonjiang, based on its climate from 1991 to 2020

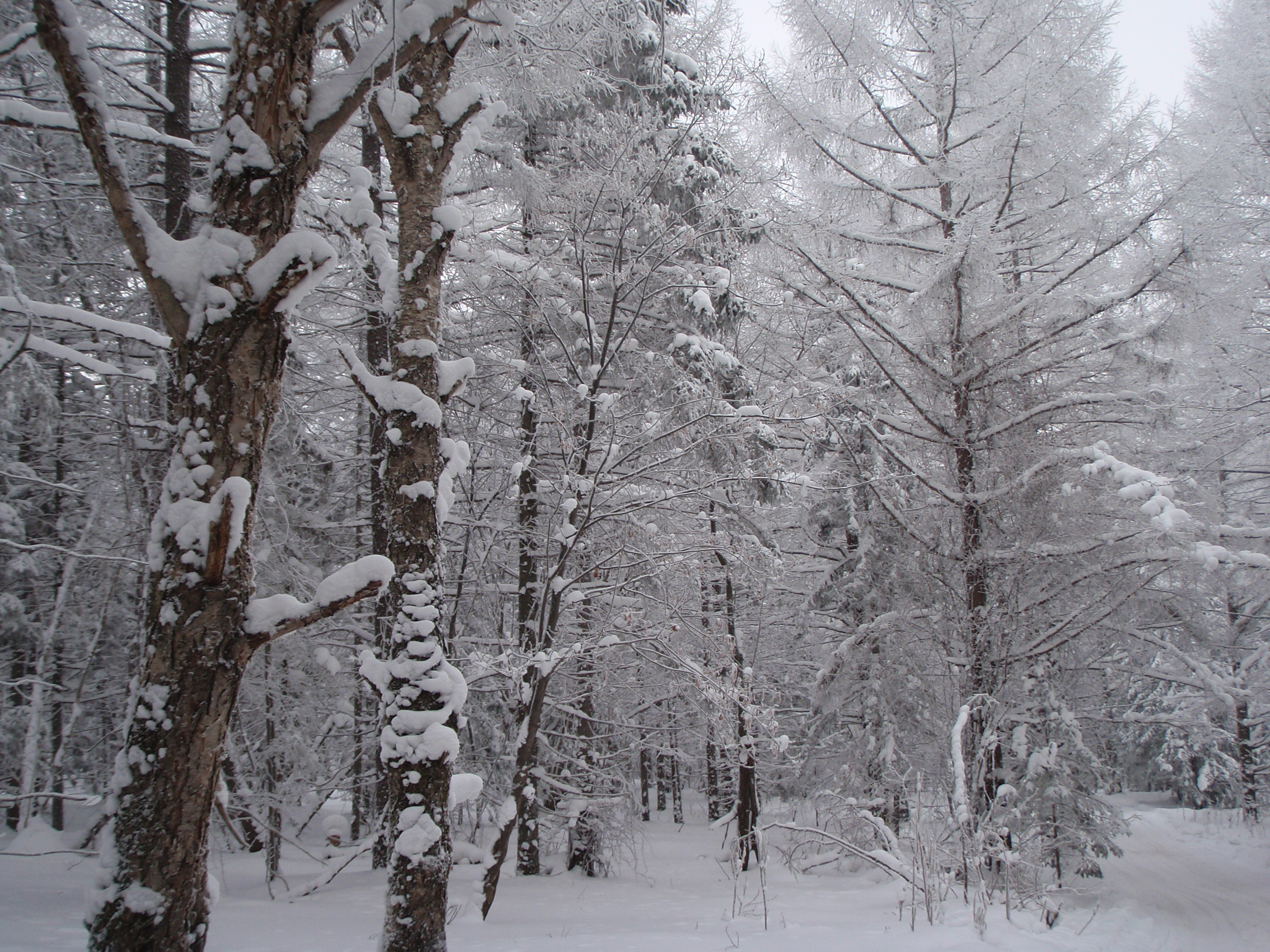
Winter in Heilongjiang

A humid continental climate (Köppen Dwa or Dwb) predominates in the province, though areas in the far north are subarctic (Köppen Dwc). Winters are long and bitter, with an average of −31 to −15 °C (−24 to 5 °F) in January, and summers are short and warm to very warm with an average of 18 to 23 °C (64 to 73 °F) in July. The annual average rainfall is 400 to 700 millimetres (16 to 28 in), concentrated heavily in summer. The province receives abundant sunshine, averaging roughly 2,300 to 2,650 hours, and in the spring, the Songnen Plain and the Sanjiang Plain provide abundant sources of wind energy.

The province's largest cities include Harbin, Qiqihar, Mudanjiang, Jiamusi, Daqing, Jixi, Shuangyashan, Hegang, Qitaihe, Yichun, and Heihe.

Average daily maximum and minimum temperatures for some locations in Heilongjiang province of China
City	July (°C)	July (°F)	January (°C)	January (°F)
Harbin	27.9/18.3	82.2/64.9	−12.5/–24.1	9.5/–11.4
Jiamusi	27.6/17.7	81.7/63.9	−12.7/–24	9.1/–11.2
Hegang	26.5/17.4	80/63.3	−12.7/–20.8	9.1/–5.4
Yichun	27.1/15.5	80.8/59.9	−14.5/–29.1	5.9/–20.4

== Transport ==
=== Roads ===
Heilongjiang boasts an extensive road network, As of October 2020. it has 165,989 km (103,141 mi) of expressways, highways and other roads. The Beijing – Harbin Expressway is the most significant expressway corridor to the province, which begins at the Heilongjiang – Jilin border and ends within the Harbin Ring Expressway. The Harbin – Tongjiang Expressway runs northeast and it links far-flung counties within the jurisdiction of Harbin, Jiamusi and other major counties in Northeast Heilongjiang. Near the end of Harbin – Tongjiang Expressway, Jiansanjiang–Heixiazi Island Expressway branches off the main expressway at Jiansanjiang and connects many state-owned farms at the far east of the province before ending near the Sino-Russian border. The Suifenhe – Manzhouli Expressway is another major corridor it runs southeast to northwest and connects some of the most significant population centers of the province, including Mudanjiang, Harbin, Daqing and Qiqihar, before ending at the Heilongjiang – Inner Mongolia border. The Hegang – Dalian Expressway, another major expressway that facilitates the transportation of lumber and coal, runs between Hegang and the Heilongjiang – Jilin border in East Heilongjiang.

=== Railways ===
There are 60 railway lines of around 5,300 kilometres (3,300 miles) including a section of the Eurasian Land Bridge. The Harbin–Dalian high-speed railway, completed in 2012, stretches from Harbin, Heilongjiang's capital, to Dalian in Liaoning province via Changchun and Shenyang comprising 23 stops. It is expected to transport 37 million passengers per year by 2020 and 51 million by 2030.

=== Airports ===
Major airports include Harbin Taiping International Airport, Qiqihar Airport, Mudanjiang Airport, Jiamusi Airport and Heihe Airport. Harbin International Airport is capable of handling six million passengers every year and connects to over 70 domestic and international cities.

=== Tongjiang-Nizhneleninskoye railway bridge ===
The Tongjiang-Nizhneleninskoye railway bridge was proposed in 2007 by Valery Solomonovich Gurevich, the vice-chairman of the Jewish Autonomous Oblast in Russia. The railway bridge over the Amur river will connect Tongjiang with Nizhneleninskoye, a village in the Jewish Autonomous Oblast.

The Chinese portion of the bridge was finished in July 2016. In December 2016, work began on the Russian portion of the bridge. Completion of structural link between the two sides of the bridge was completed in March 2019. Opening to rail traffic has been repeatedly delayed, with the December 2019 estimate being "the end of 2020", and then 3rd quarter of 2021.

== Administrative divisions ==
Administrative divisions of Heilongjiang
Division code	Division	Area in km^{2}	Population 2010	Density (per km^{2})	Seat	Divisions			
Division code	Division	Area in km^{2}	Population 2010	Density (per km^{2})	Seat	Districts*	Counties	Aut. counties	CL cities
230000	Heilongjiang Province	454,800.00	38,312,224	84.2	Harbin city	54	45	1	21
230100	Harbin city	53,523.50	10,635,971	198.7	Songbei District	9	7		2
230200	Qiqihar city	42,205.81	5,367,003	127.2	Jianhua District	7	8		1
230300	Jixi city	22,488.46	1,862,161	82.8	Jiguan District	6	1		2
230400	Hegang city	14,679.98	1,058,665	72.1	Xiangyang District	6	2		
230500	Shuangyashan city	26,483.00	1,462,626	55.2	Jianshan District	4	4		
230600	Daqing city	22,161.00	2,904,532	131.1	Sartu District	5	3	1	
230700	Yichun city	39,017.00	1,148,126	29.4	Yimei District	4	5		1
230800	Jiamusi city	31,528.00	2,552,097	80.9	Qianjin District	4	3		3
230900	Qitaihe city	6,221.42	920,419	147.9	Taoshan District	3	1		
231000	Mudanjiang city	40,233.00	2,798,723	69.6	Dong'an District	4	1		5
231100	Heihe city	66,802.65	1,673,898	25.1	Aihui District	1	2		3
231200	Suihua city	34,964.17	5,416,439	154.9	Beilin District	1	6		3
232700	Daxing'anling Prefecture	46,755.00^{≈}	511,564	10.9	Jiagedaqi District** (de facto); Mohe city (de jure)	4**	2		1
Sub-provincial cities * – including Ethnic districts ** – administrative districts not registered under the Ministry of Civil Affairs (not included in the total Districts' count) ≈ – not including territories within Inner Mongolia (if included: 82,928.80 km^{2} or 32,018.99 sq mi)

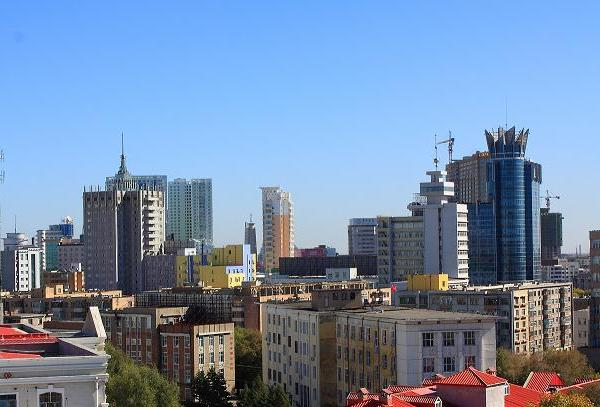
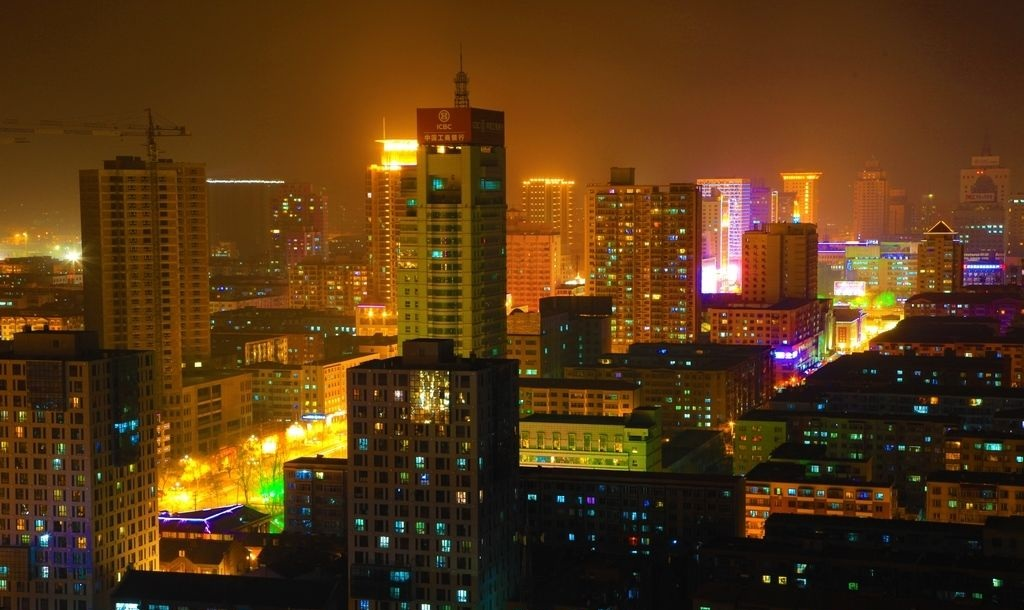
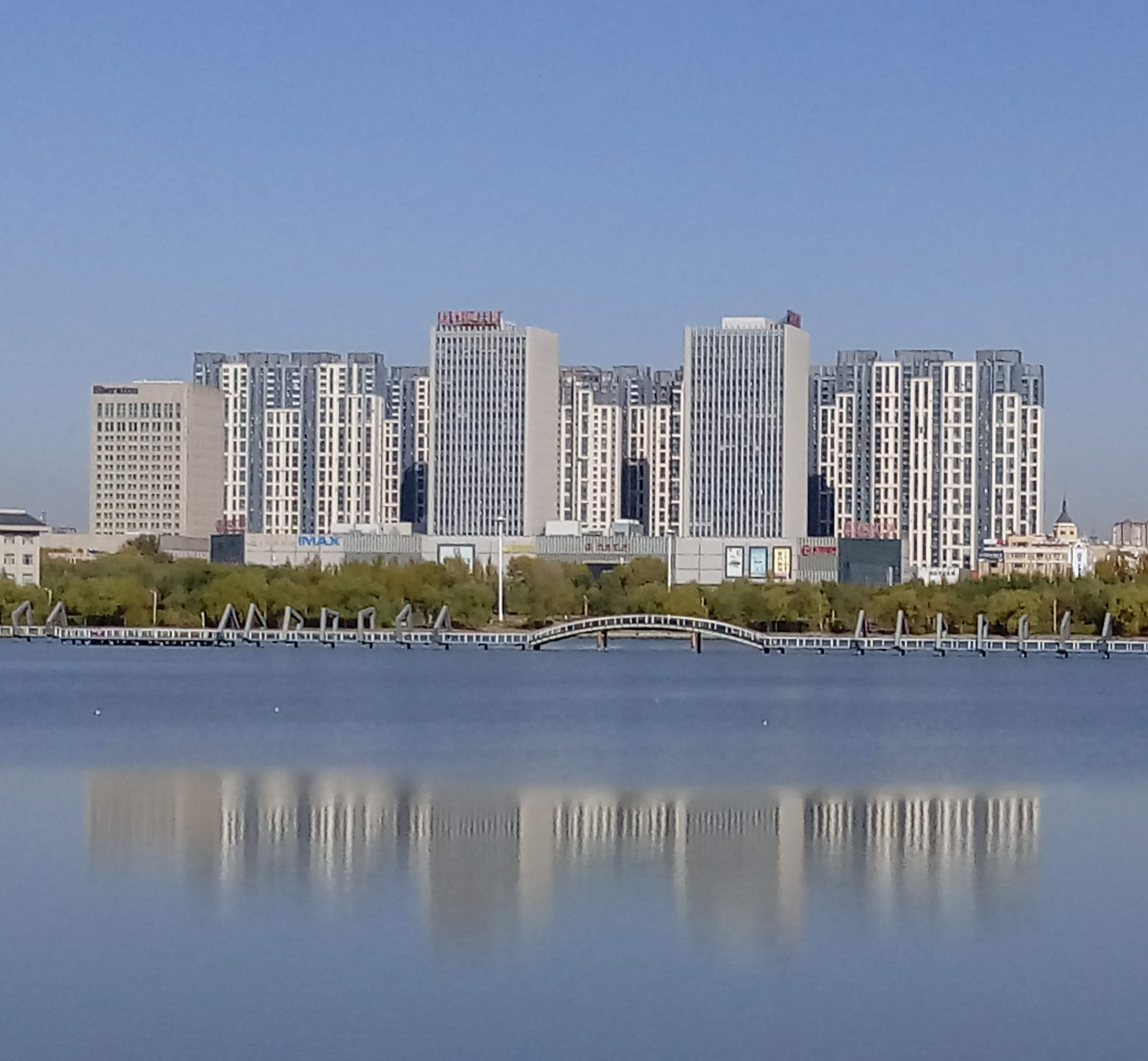
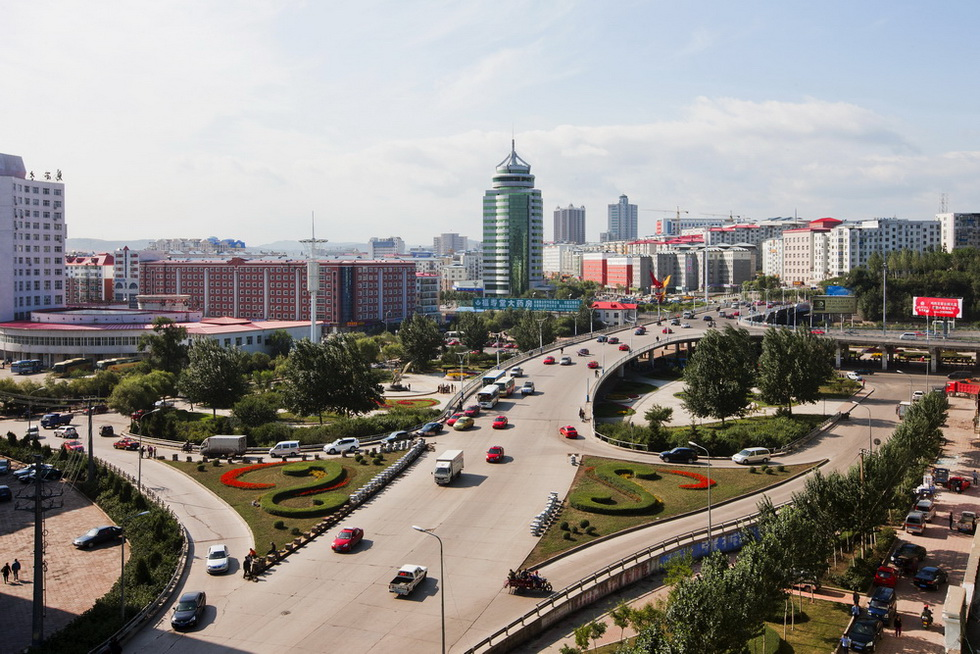
From left to right: Qiqihar, Mudanjiang, Daqing, Jixi

Administrative divisions in Chinese and varieties of romanizations
English	Chinese	Pinyin
Heilongjiang Province	黑龙江省	Hēilóngjiāng Shěng
Harbin city	哈尔滨市	Hā'ěrbīn Shì
Qiqihar city	齐齐哈尔市	Qíqíhā'ěr Shì
Jixi city	鸡西市	Jīxī Shì
Hegang city	鹤岗市	Hègǎng Shì
Shuangyashan city	双鸭山市	Shuāngyāshān Shì
Daqing city	大庆市	Dàqìng Shì
Yichun city	伊春市	Yīchūn Shì
Jiamusi city	佳木斯市	Jiāmùsī Shì
Qitaihe city	七台河市	Qītáihé Shì
Mudanjiang city	牡丹江市	Mǔdānjiāng Shì
Heihe city	黑河市	Hēihé Shì
Suihua city	绥化市	Suíhuà Shì
Daxing'anling Prefecture	大兴安岭地区	Dàxīng'ānlǐng Dìqū

(Additional information regarding the last prefecture can be found at Greater Khingan.)

These 13 prefecture-level divisions are subdivided into 128 county-level divisions (65 districts, 20 county-level cities, 42 counties, and one autonomous county). Those are in turn divided into 1,284 township-level divisions (473 towns, 400 townships, 58 ethnic townships, and 353 subdistricts).

Population by urban areas of prefecture & county cities
#	Cities	2020 Urban area	2010 Urban area	2020 City proper
1	Harbin	5,805,358	4,933,054 (Note: New district established after 2010 census: Shuangcheng (Shuangcheng CLC). The new district not included in the urban area count of the pre-expanded city.)	10,009,854
2	Daqing	1,370,248	1,433,698	2,781,562
3	Qiqihar	1,246,292	1,314,720	4,067,489
4	Mudanjiang	808,216	790,623	2,290,208
5	Jiamusi	698,557	631,357	2,156,505
6	Jixi	626,019	746,889	1,502,060
7	Hegang	514,826	600,941	891,271
8	Qitaihe	426,065	503,678	689,611
9	Shuangyashan	388,847	481,110	1,208,803
10	Suihua	355,700	364,225	3,756,167
11	Yichun	331,640	694,019 (Note: The stats does not reflect the Yichun PLC reorganization in 2019 after 2010 census.)	878,881
12	Zhaodong	312,289	358,606	see Suihua
13	Wuchang	256,842	259,836	see Harbin
14	Shangzhi	246,880	269,699	see Harbin
15	Fujin	240,925	215,237	see Jiamusi
16	Nenjiang	223,587	(Note: Nenjiang County is currently known as Nenjiang CLC after 2010 census.)	see Heihe
17	Bei'an	213,850	248,471	see Heihe
18	Anda	196,645	223,486	see Suihua
19	Nehe	193,396	233,724	see Qiqihar
20	Heihe	189,471	147,042	1,286,401
21	Mishan	186,287	176,612	see Jixi
22	Hulin	184,294	193,028	see Jixi
23	Hailin	180,669	216,633	see Mudanjiang
24	Tieli	173,360	235,148	see Yichun
25	Hailun	164,766	188,461	see Suihua
26	Wudalianchi	135,828	148,465	see Heihe
27	Jiagedaqi (Note: Jiagedaqi Administrative Zone is a special urban area jurisdiction that is de jure part of Hulunbuir, Inner Mongolia but, currently de facto under Daxing'anling Prefecture control.)	133,790	142,465	part of Daxing'anling Prefecture
28	Ning'an	123,311	128,469	see Mudanjiang
29	Tongjiang	112,222	99,829	see Jiamusi
30	Suifenhe	111,455	128,363	see Mudanjiang
31	Dongning	96,018	(Note: Dongning County is currently known as Dongning CLC after 2010 census.)	see Mudanjiang
32	Muling	91,287	112,882	see Mudanjiang
33	Fuyuan	79,754	(Note: Fuyuan County is currently known as Fuyuan CLC after 2010 census.)	see Jiamusi
34	Mohe	53,460	(Note: Mohe County is currently known as Mohe CLC after 2010 census.)	part of Daxing'anling Prefecture
35	Xinlin (Note: Xinlin Administrative Zone is a special urban area jurisdiction that is de jure part of Huma County.)	20,362	50,859	part of Daxing'anling Prefecture
36	Huzhong (Note: Huzhong Administrative Zone is a special urban area jurisdiction that is de jure part of Huma County.)	16,359	45,039	part of Daxing'anling Prefecture
37	Songling (Note: Songling Administrative Zone is a special urban area jurisdiction that is de jure part of Hulunbuir, Inner Mongolia but, currently de facto under Daxing'anling Prefecture control.)	14,872	30,205	part of Daxing'anling Prefecture
—	Shuangcheng	see Harbin	244,898	see Harbin

Most populous cities in Heilongjiang Source: China Urban Construction Statistical Yearbook 2018 Urban Population and Urban Temporary Population
Rank		Pop.	Rank		Pop.
1	Harbin	4,860,000	11	Suihua	375,100
2	Daqing	1,425,000	12	Zhaodong	243,000
3	Qiqihar	1,094,000	13	Anda	232,900
4	Yichun	765,200	14	Wuchang	190,300
5	Jixi	674,500	15	Shangzhi	156,600
6	Mudanjiang	672,000	16	Heihe	148,000
7	Jiamusi	590,000	17	Hailun	138,000
8	Hegang	526,000	18	Bei'an	130,700
9	Shuangyashan	457,000	19	Fujin	125,500
10	Qitaihe	418,700	20	Tieli	116,300

== Politics ==
Like all governing institutions in mainland China, Heilongjiang has a parallel party-government system, in which the CCP Heilongjiang Provincial Committee Secretary outranks the Governor. The CCP Heilongjiang Provincial Committee acts as the top policy-formulation body, and has control over the Heilongjiang Provincial People's Government.

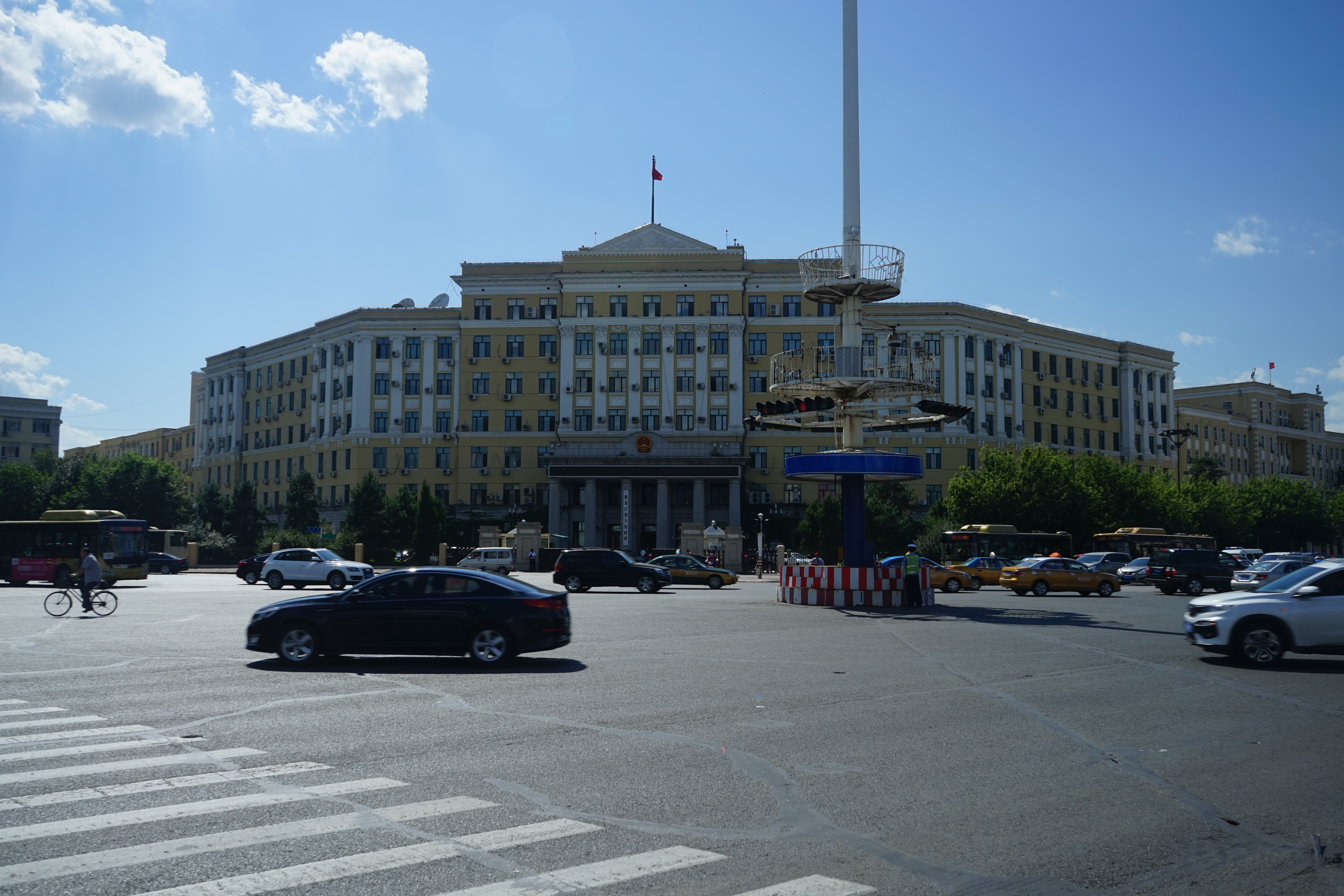
Heilongjiang Province People's Government

== Economy ==
In 2022, Heilongjiang's GDP was 1.59 trillion RMB ($236 billion in GDP nominal), with a per capita GDP of CN¥51,906 (US$7,717 in nominal). Its primary, secondary, and tertiary industries contributed ¥360 billion (22.7%), ¥465 billion (29.2%), and ¥764 billion (48%) to GDP, respectively.

Heilongjiang's GDP has been rising steadily since 2003, growing from 443.3 billion yuan in 2003 to 707.72 billion yuan in 2007, a 60 % increase. The value of the private economy reached RMB234 billion in 2006 and accounted for 37.6 percent of the GDP. In that year, the tax revenue from private enterprises hit RMB20.5 billion.

Private enterprises in Heilongjiang led the overall economic growth of the province. Many leading private enterprises have begun to emerge.

=== Agriculture ===
Heilongjiang is home to China's largest plantations of rice, corn and soybeans, with a total of 14.37 million ha (35.5 million acres) of grain plantation area, including 4 million ha (9.9 million acres) of rice plantation and 5.5 million ha (14 million acres) of corn. Heilongjiang has vast tracts of black soil (chernozem), one of the most fertile soil types. Since the early 20th century, cultivation in the black soil belt has expanded by almost 100-fold, and after the 1960s agriculture in the region transformed to modern agriculture with heavy mechanization and an increase of fertilizer use. Heilongjiang is one of the Asia's leading production areas for japonica rice, known for high quality brand rice varieties. The introduction of cold-resistant varieties, favorable policies and climate change have all contributed to a significant increase in rice production in recent years. Commercial crops grown include beets, flax, sunflowers.

Heilongjiang is also an important source of lumber for China. Pine, especially the Korean pine and larch are the most important forms of lumber produced in Heilongjiang. Forests are mostly found in the Greater Khingan Mountains and Lesser Khingan Mountains, which are also home to protected animal species such as the Siberian tiger, the red-crowned crane, and the lynx.

Herding in Heilongjiang is centered upon horses and cattle; the province has the largest number of milk cows among all the province-level divisions of China.

=== Industry ===
Heilongjiang is part of northeast China, the country's traditional industrial base. Industry is focused upon coal, petroleum, lumber, machinery, and food. Due to its location, Heilongjiang is also an important gateway for trade with Russia. Since a wave of privatization led to the closure of uncompetitive factories in the 1990s, Manchuria has suffered from stagnation. As a result, the government has started the Revitalize Northeast China campaign to deal with this problem, promoting the private sectors as the preferred method of the reform and opening up.

Petroleum is of great importance in Heilongjiang, and the Daqing oilfields are an important source of petroleum for China. Coal, gold, and graphite are other important minerals to be found in Heilongjiang. Heilongjiang also has great potential for wind power, with potential capacity for 134 gigawatts of power production.

=== Development zones ===
- Daqing New & Hi-Tech Industrial Development Zone

Daqing New & Hi-Tech Industrial Development Zone was constructed in April 1992 and was then approved as a national high-tech zone by the State Council later that year. Its initial zone area is 208.54 km^{2} (80.52 sq mi), and it recently expanded the area by 32.45 km^{2} (12.53 sq mi).

- Heihe Border Economic Cooperation Area
- Harbin Economic and Technological Development Zone
- Harbin New & Hi-Tech Industrial Development Zone

Harbin High-tech Zone was set up in 1988 and was approved by the State Council as a national development zone in 1991. It has a total area of 34 km^{2} (13 sq mi) in the centralized parks, subdivided into Nangang, Haping Road and Yingbin Road Centralized Parks. The Nangang Centralized Park is designated for the incubation of high-tech projects and research and development base of enterprises as well as tertiary industries such as finance, insurance, services, catering, tourism, culture, recreation and entertainment, where the headquarters of major well-known companies and their branches in Harbin are located; the Haping Road Centralized Park is a comprehensive industrial basis for the investment projects of automobile and automobile parts manufacturing, medicines, foodstuffs, electronics, textile; the Yingbin Road Centralized Park is mainly for high-tech incubation projects and high-tech industrial development.

- Sino-Russia Dongning-Piurtaphca Trade Zone

Sino-Russia Dongning-Piurtaphca Trade Zone was approved by the State Council in 2000 and was completed in 2005. The zone has a planned area of 275.4 hectares. The Chinese part of the zone has a 22-hectare trade center with four subsidiary areas, A, B, C, and D, in which more than 6,000 stalls are already set up, mainly dealing with clothes, household appliances, food, construction materials, etc.

- Suifenhe Border Economic Cooperation Area

Suifenhe Border Economic Cooperation District (Suifenhe BECD) is located in the north of Suifenhe City, and borders Russia to the east. Suifenhe BECD is the largest among the three state-level border-trade zones of Heilongjiang, in terms of investor numbers. Suifenhe BECD has a convenient transport network. The Binzhou-Suifenhe Railway, which connects the Russian Far East Railway, is an important port for export. The railway distance between Suifenhe and Harbin is 548 km (341 mi). Buguranikinai, the corresponding Russian port city, is 21 km (13 mi) away.

== Demographics ==
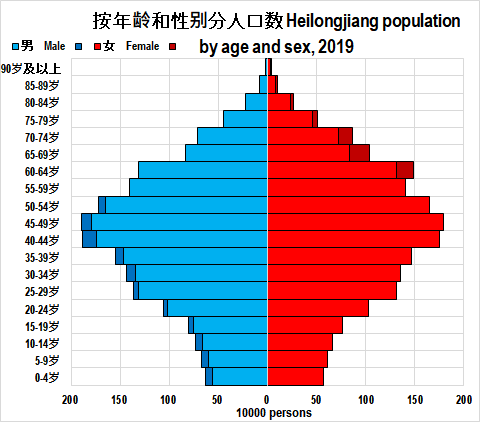
Heilongjiang population pyramid in 2019

Historical population
Year	Pop.	±%
1912	2,029,000	—
1928	3,725,000	+83.6%
1936–37	3,751,000	+0.7%
1947	2,844,000	−24.2%
1954	11,897,309	+318.3%
1964	20,118,271	+69.1%
1982	32,665,546	+62.4%
1990	35,214,873	+7.8%
2000	36,237,576	+2.9%
2010	38,312,224	+5.7%
2020	31,850,088	−16.9%
Established in 1923; dissolved in 1932 and incorporated into Manchukuo / Heilongjiang Province (present). Harbin part of Heilongjiang Province until 1947–1949 and 1953–1954. Dongsheng SAR dissolved in 1932 and incorporated into Manchukuo / Heilongjiang Province (present). Songjiang Province dissolved in 1955 and incorporated into Heilongjiang Province. Hejiang Province dissolved in 1949 and incorporated into Songjiang Province / Heilongjiang Province (present). Nenjiang Province dissolved in 1949 and incorporated into Heilongjiang Province.

By the end of 2022, Heilongjiang Province had a permanent resident population of 30.99 million. This represented a decrease of 260,000 from the previous year. The urban population was 20.52 million, and the rural population was 10.47 million. The urbanization rate reached 66.2%, up 0.5 percentage points from the previous year. The age composition was as follows:

- Ages 0–14: 9.3% of the total population
- Ages 65 and above: 17.8% of the total population

According to the 2021 Statistical Bulletin, the province's total permanent population was 31.25 million, a decrease of 460,000 compared with 2020.

Based on the Seventh National Population Census (2020), the total permanent population of Heilongjiang was 31,850,088. Compared with the Sixth Census (2010) figure of 38,313,991, the province's population declined by 6,463,903 over ten years (−16.87%), with an average annual growth rate of −1.83%.

Breakdown by gender and age:

- Males: 15,952,468 (50.09%)
- Females: 15,897,620 (49.91%)
- Sex ratio (females = 100): 100.35
- Ages 0–14: 3,286,466 (10.32%)
- Ages 15–59: 21,167,932 (66.46%)
- Ages 60 and above: 7,395,690 (23.22%), including 4,972,868 aged 65+ (15.61%)
- Urban residents: 20,897,694 (65.61%)
- Rural residents: 10,952,394 (34.39%)

In 2020, the birth rate was 3.35‰, the death rate was 8.23‰, and the natural growth rate was −4.48‰. Heilongjiang's demographic profile is characterized by a low birth rate, low death rate, and a high level of population aging. In addition, out-migration has contributed to a continuous population decline since 2014.

=== Ethnic groups ===
The majority of Heilongjiang's population is Han Chinese, while ethnic minorities include the Manchus, Koreans, Mongols, Hui, Xibe, and Hezhen.

In Heilongjiang Province, the Han Chinese constitute an overwhelming majority, many of whom are descendants of immigrants from Shandong and Hebei during the Qing dynasty. Ten indigenous ethnic minorities are officially recognized: the Manchu, Korean, Mongol, Hui, Daur, Xibe, Hezhen, Oroqen, Evenki, and Kyrgyz peoples. Among these, the Hezhen are unique to Heilongjiang Province. Within the province, there is the Dorbod Mongol Autonomous County, the Meilisi Daur District in Qiqihar, as well as several ethnic townships.

Among the province's permanent residents, the Han population numbers 30,728,612, accounting for 96.48% of the total; all ethnic minorities together total 1,121,476, or 3.52%. Compared with the 2010 Sixth National Population Census, the Han population decreased by 6,210,569 people (−16.81%) but their proportion rose by 0.07 percentage points. Minority populations decreased by 253,334 (−18.43%), and their proportion declined by 0.07 percentage points. Specifically:

- The Manchu population decreased by 164,213 (−21.95%), down 0.12 percentage points in proportion.
- The Korean Chinese population decreased by 57,683 (−17.6%), down 0.01 percentage points.
- The Mongol population decreased by 13,273 (−10.58%), but their proportion rose by 0.02 percentage points.
- The Hui population decreased by 26,285 (−25.83%), down 0.03 percentage points.
- The Daur population decreased by 6,607 (−16.4%), with no change in proportion.
- The Xibe population decreased by 1,349 (−17.73%), with no change in proportion.
- The Hezhen population increased by 192 (+5.31%), with no change in proportion.

Ethnic composition of Heilongjiang Province (Seventh National Population Census, 2020)
Ethnic group	Han Chinese	Manchu	Korean	Mongol	Hui	Daur	Xibe	Zhuang	Miao	Hezhen	Other minorities
Population	30,728,612	583,807	270,123	112,210	75,464	33,670	6,259	3,890	3,852	3,805	28,396
Share of total population (%)	96.48	1.83	0.85	0.35	0.24	0.11	0.02	0.01	0.01	0.01	0.09
Share among minorities (%)	—	52.06	24.09	10.01	6.73	3.00	0.56	0.35	0.34	0.34	2.53

== Religion ==
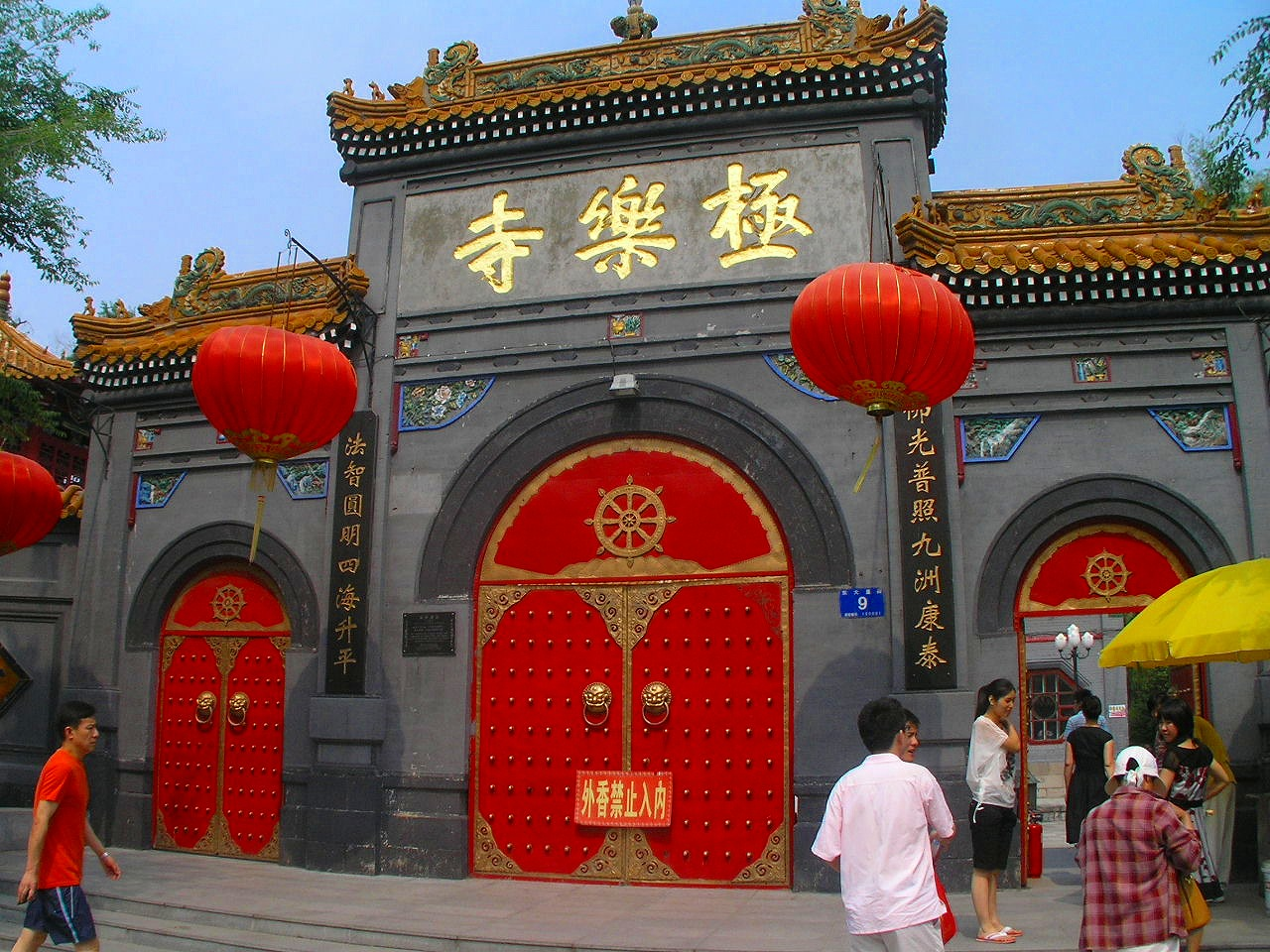
Ji Le Temple (Temple of Bliss), a Buddhist temple in Harbin

Most of Heilongjiang's residents are either non-religious or practice Chinese folk religions, including Taoism. Manchu shamanism is practiced by many Manchu people. Chinese Buddhism and Tibetan Buddhism have an important presence in the province.

== Culture ==
Heilongjiang's culture is part of a culture of Northeast China that is relatively homogeneous across this region, known in Mandarin Chinese as "Dongbei" (the northeast).

== Media ==
Heilongjiang Daily Press Group

Heilongjiang Television and Harbin Economy Radio serve as broadcasters.

== Tourism ==
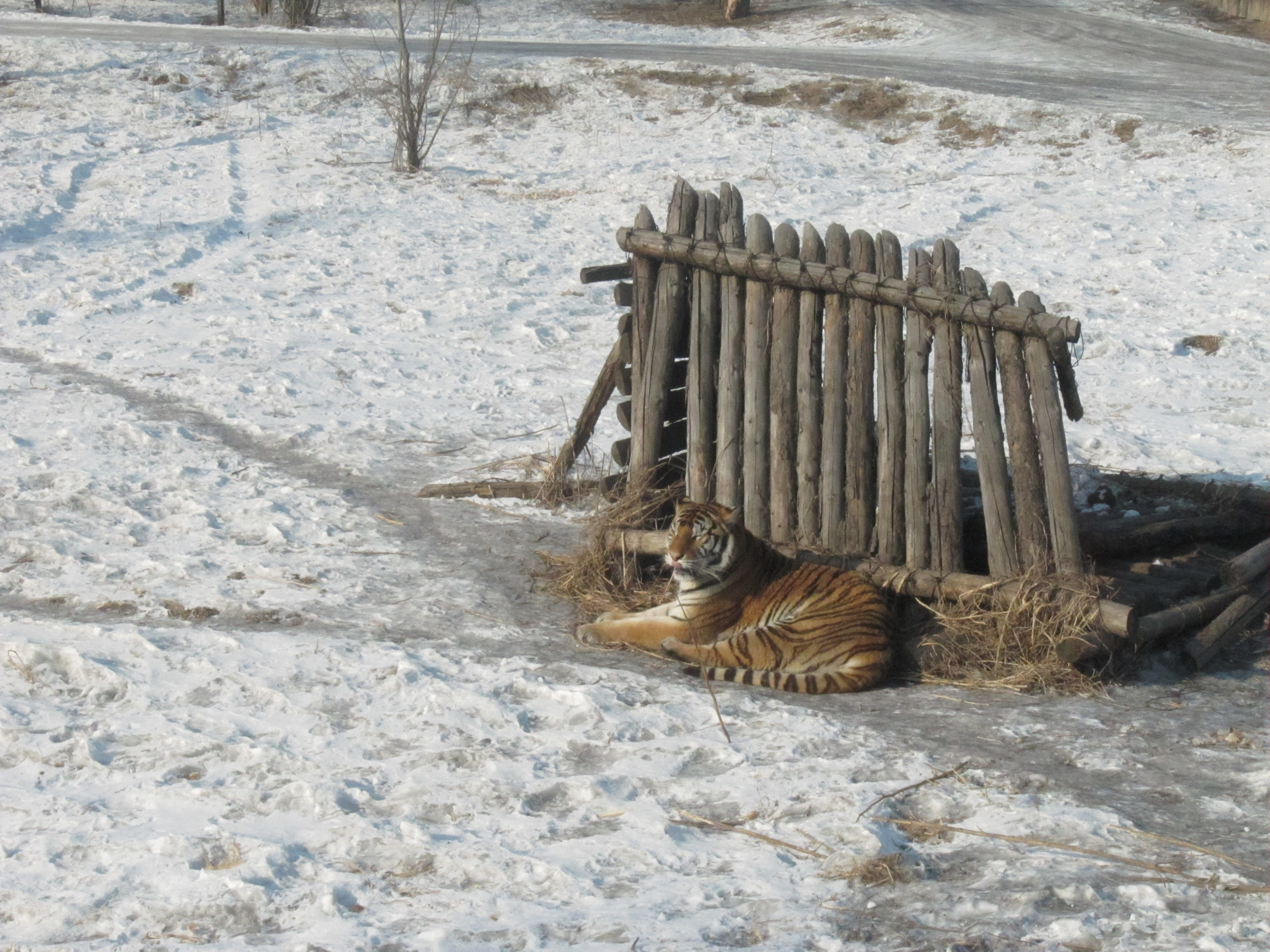
A Siberian tiger at Harbin Siberian Tiger Park

Harbin, the provincial capital, is a city of contrasts, with Chinese, Russian, and eclectic worldwide influences clearly apparent. Bukui Mosque, a national heritage site, is the largest glazed-tile building in the province. Eastern Orthodox, Roman Catholic, and Protestant churches as well as synagogues dot the city.

The long, cold winter is the site of its famed ice sculpture exhibitions. In 2007 the 8th Ice and Snow World opened to visitors in Harbin. More than 2,000 ice sculptures were on display at the annual event.

Wudalianchi Lakes are a series of five lakes formed between 1719 and 1721 when volcanic eruption shaped one section of a tributary of the Amur into five interconnected lakes. The second lake in particular is renowned for its irregular geological sights. Lake Jingbo, in Ning'an County, is a section of the Mudan River that has been narrowed and shaped by volcanic eruption into a series of sights, including the Diaoshuilou Falls.

The province has a zoological park called "Harbin Siberian Tiger Park".

== Colleges and universities ==
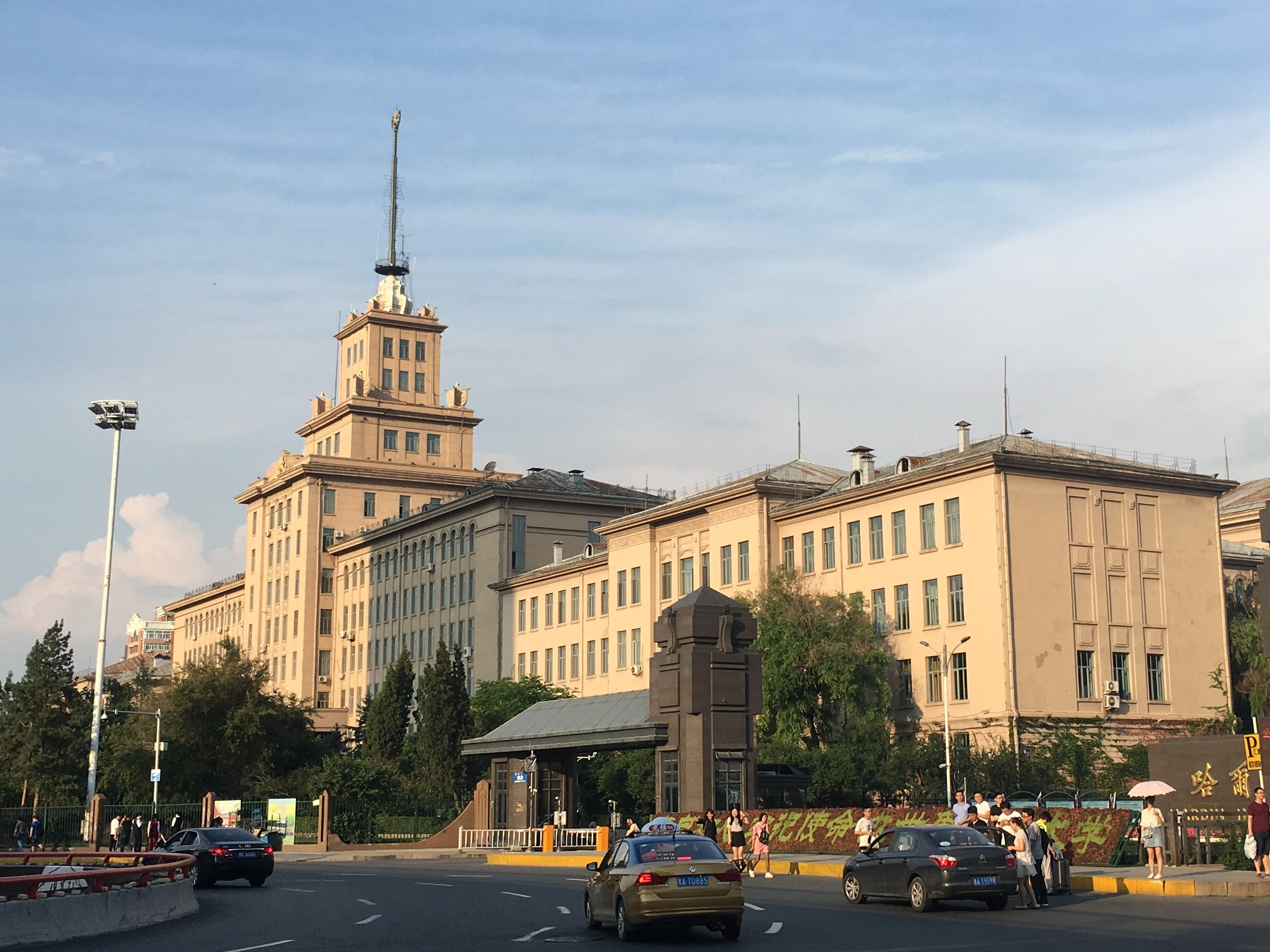
HIT is the only 985-tier university in the province, and one of the C9 League, the best university league in the country

Partial list of universities:

- Daqing Staff and Workers University
- Harbin Institute of Technology
- Harbin Engineering University
- Harbin Medical University
- Harbin Normal University
- Harbin University of Science and Technology
- Heilongjiang August First Land Reclamation University
- Heilongjiang Commercial University
- Heilongjiang University
- Heilongjiang University of Chinese Medicine
- Heilongjiang International University
- Heilongjiang Institute of Technology
- Northeast Agricultural University
- Northeast Forestry University
- Northeast Petroleum University
- Qiqihar University

== Sports ==
Heilongjiang is in the forefront of promoting winter sports and winter-featured sports industry in China. For example, it is promoting bandy as an Olympic sport.

=== Events and leagues ===
- 2009 Winter Universiade
- 2018 Bandy World Championship, Division B
- Asia League Ice Hockey

== Notable people ==
- Mao Buyi, singer-songwriter
- Meng Nan, singer-songwriter
- Ningning, singer from the K-pop girl group Aespa
- Song Yadong, UFC Fighter
- Wang Manyu, Chinese table tennis player
- Zhang Shan Qi, racing driver

== See also ==
- Major national historical and cultural sites in Heilongjiang
