= Călin =

Călin [kəˈli:n] is a Romanian masculine given name and surname of probable Slavic origin meaning guelder rose. It is similar to the Bulgarian masculine given name Kalin and the Bulgarian, Ukrainian and Russian feminine given name Kalyna. But it may be related to the Greek name Kalinikos meaning fair or beautiful victor. It may refer to:

- Călin Alupi (1906–1988), Romanian painter
- Călin Dan (born 1955), Romanian artist, theorist and curator
- Călin Georgescu
- Călin Matei (born 1966), Romanian politician
- Călin Moldovan (born 1981), Romanian football player
- Călin Popescu-Tăriceanu (born 1952), Romanian politician
- Călin Peter Netzer (born 1975), German-Romanian film director
- Călin Popescu (born 2001), Romanian professional footballer
- Cristian Călin Panin (born 1978), Romanian football player
- Ottoi Călin (1886–1917), Romanian physician, journalist and socialist militant of Jewish descent

== See also ==
- Călinescu (surname)
- Călinești (disambiguation)
- Călinești River (disambiguation)
- Călina (given name), a Romanian given name
- Calinic (given name), a Romanian given name
