= Bastak Nature Reserve =

Nature reserve in the Jewish Autonomous Oblast, Russia

- Russian: Бастак заповедник (Also: Bastack)
- IUCN category Ia (strict nature reserve)
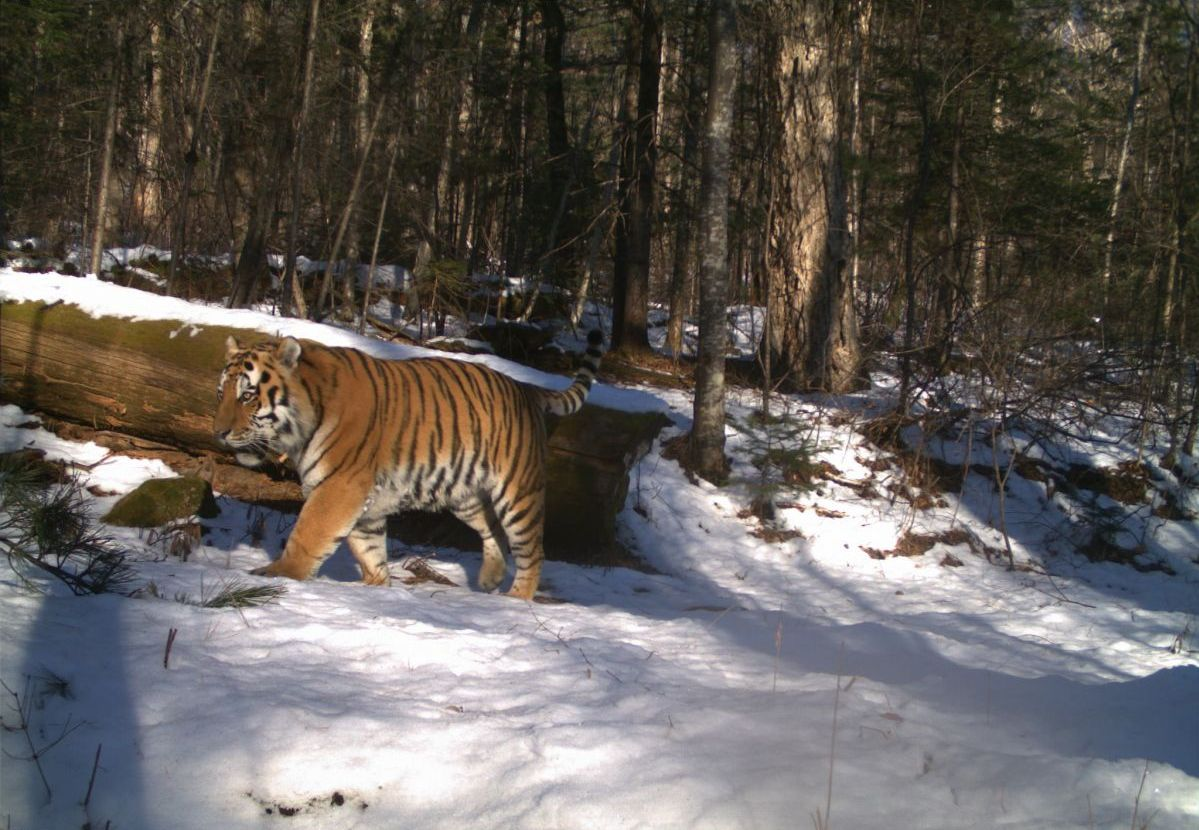
- Bastak Zapovednik

- Location within Russia
- Location: Jewish Autonomous Oblast
- Nearest city: Birobidzhan
- Coordinates: 48°56′37″N 133°7′13″E
- Area: 91,375 hectares (225,793 acres; 353 sq mi)
- Established: 1997
- Governing body: Ministry of Natural Resources and Environment (Russia)
- Website: https://www.bastak-eao.ru/

Bastak Nature Reserve (Russian: Бастак заповедник) (also Bastack) is a Russian "zapovednik" (strict nature reserve) located in the Amur River basin in the Russian Far East. The reserve's territory covers the south-eastern spurs Bureya Range and the northern outskirts of the Sredneamurskaya lowlands. The reserve is situated in about 10 km north of the city of Birobidzhan in the Birobidzhansky District, and is the only national reserve in the Jewish Autonomous Oblast.

== Topography ==
The reserve can be pictured as divided into two halves, mountainous to the northwest, lowlands to the southeast. The highlands of the northwest are south-eastern spurs Khingan-Bureya mountain system, an ancient crystalline massif. The southeast lowlands of the reserve are part of the Sikhote-Alin Mountain fold system. The mountain ridges run north–south, which is typical for the Far East. In the north of the reserve, the mountains range up to 1,207 meters in altitude (Mt. Byrdyr), with an average altitude of 800 meters; the slopes are steep and the river valleys deep. To the south, the altitudes average 400–500 meters, and the terrain is hilly with more rounded and flat tops than steep valleys. The lowest areas at 200 meters are alluvial floodplains.

The Amur River runs across the southern border of Bastak, and the reserve itself has a complex network of short rivers and few lakes. The rivers and streams generally run from northwest to southeast with the upper half in rocky valleys and lower courses in meandering floodplain. Spring floods can be significant. The longest river is the Bastak River at 73 km.

== Climate and ecoregion ==
Bastak is located in the Ussuri broadleaf and mixed forests ecoregion. The Ussuri River region is in the middle Amur River basin, on the west slope of the Sikhote-Alin Mountains. Mixed broadleaf species such as Manchurian ash and Japanese elm in the lowlands, Korean pine and broadleaf forests in the middle elevations, and fir and spruce up to the subalpine levels.

The climate of Bastak is Humid continental climate, cool summer (Köppen climate classification (Dwb)). This climate is characterized by high variation in temperature, both daily and seasonally; with dry winters and cool summers.

== Flora and fauna ==
Most of the territory is forested, with some marshy floodplains in the lowlands, and tundra (moss, lichen, mountain herbs and small shrubs) on the top of Mt. Bydyr. Plants in the Bastak Reserve belong to three different floristic complexes: Sea of Okhotsk, East Siberian, and Manchurian. The middle belt of the mountains are old-growth cedar-broadleaf forests, with birch, walnut, elm, and linden. The understory in the middle belt can be thick with bushes such as Viburnum sargentii, Siberian ginseng, and honeysuckle. The lowest altitudes are typically alder, birch, and rhododendrum, with grassy meadows. The reserve has recorded 543 species of vascular plants.

The birds of the reserve (195 species reported), reflect the diversity of terrain and the location at the meeting points of different ecoregions. Forest birds are the most numerous, with representative species and types being buzzard, grouse, black grouse, jays, crows, woodpeckers, thrushes, warblers, flycatchers, and nutcrackers. The mammals are those typical of the Ussuri forests (roe deer, wild hogs, brown bears, Himalayan bears). The most common mammals of prey are the Raccoon dog and the Sable. The endangered Siberian tiger is known to be resident.

== Ecotourism ==
As a strict nature reserve, the Bastak Reserve is mostly closed to the general public, although scientists and those with "environmental education" purposes can make arrangements with park management for visits. There is one educational hiking trail in the reserve, however, that is open to the public, but it requires permits to be obtained in advance, hikers must have vaccinations against tick-borne infections, and visitors are limited to 40 per month. The main office is in the city of Birobidzhan.

== See also ==
- List of Russian Nature Reserves (class 1a 'zapovedniks')
