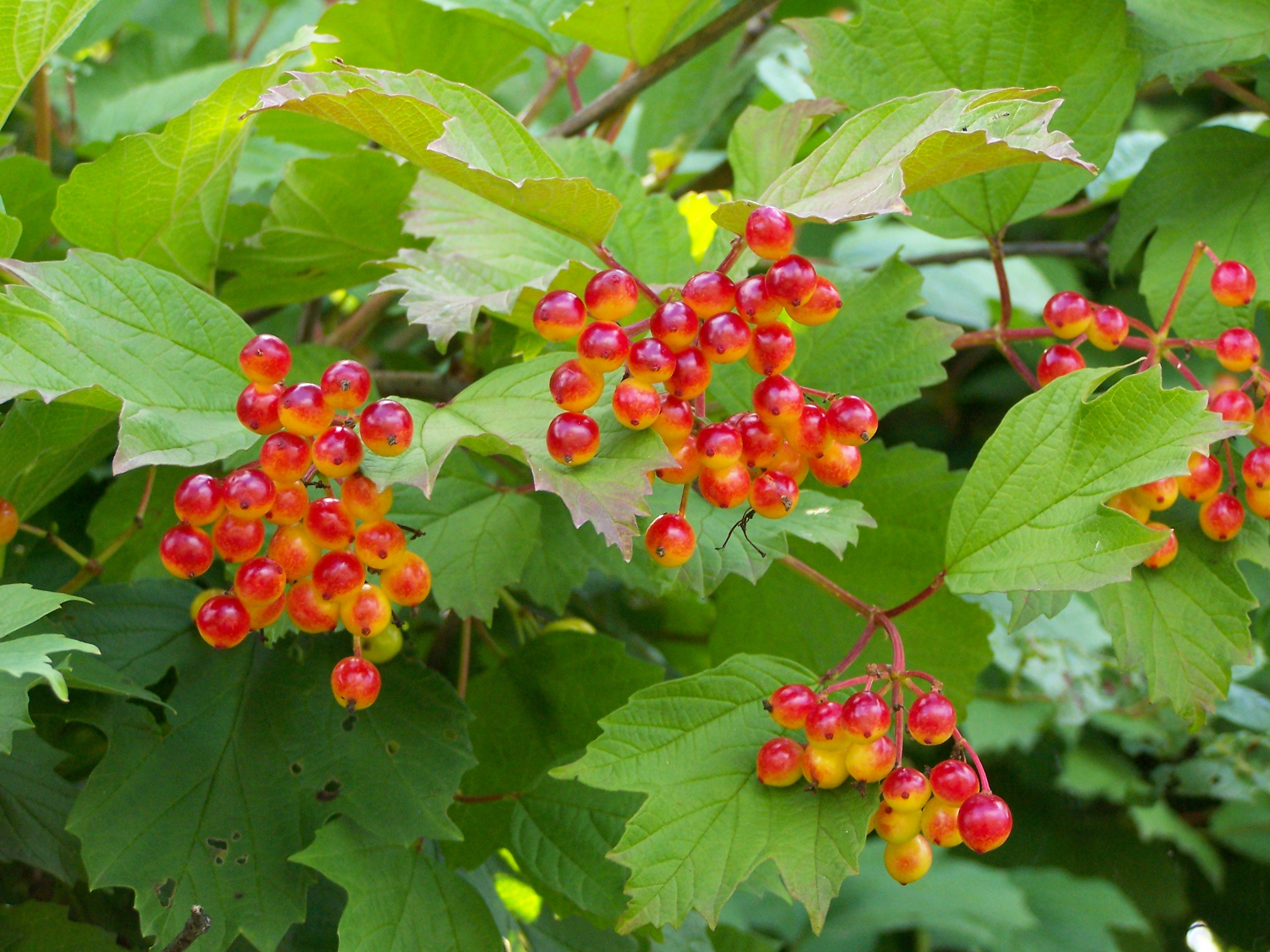

Scientific classification
- Kingdom: Plantae
- Clade: Tracheophytes
- Clade: Angiosperms
- Clade: Eudicots
- Clade: Asterids
- Order: Dipsacales
- Family: Viburnaceae
- Genus: Viburnum
- Species: V. opulus

Binomial name
- Viburnum opulus L.

Synonyms
- List: Opulus edulis J.Presl; Opulus glandulosa Moench; Opulus glandulosa var. globosa Schur; Opulus lobatofolia Gilib.; Opulus oxycoccos (Pursh) J.Presl; Opulus palustris Gray; Opulus trilobifolia Gilib. ex Ledeb.; Opulus vulgaris Borkh.; Viburnum glandulosum Salisb.; Viburnum lobatum Lam.; Viburnum nanum Dippel; Viburnum opuloides Muhl.; Viburnum opulus var. europaeum Aiton; Viburnum opulus var. europeanum Michx.; Viburnum opulus f. flavum (Horw.) P.D.Sell; Viburnum opulus var. flavum Horw.; Viburnum opulus f. glabrifolium Gajić; Viburnum opulus f. nanum (David) Zabel; Viburnum opulus var. nanum (David) H.Jaeger; Viburnum opulus nanum I.David; Viburnum opulus var. pimina Michx.; Viburnum opulus f. pygmaeum Schelle; Viburnum opulus var. roseum L.; Viburnum opulus f. roseum (L.) Hegi; Viburnum opulus var. sterile Mérat; Viburnum opulus var. sterilis DC.; Viburnum opulus var. subintegrifolium (Hook.) Torr. & A.Gray; Viburnum opulus subsp.. typicum R.T.Clausen; Viburnum opulus var. variegatum Weston; Viburnum opulus f. variegatum (Weston) Zabel; Viburnum opulus var. vasicii Gajić; Viburnum opulus xanthocarpum Späth; Viburnum opulus var. xanthocarpum (Späth) C.K.Schneid.; Viburnum opulus f. xanthocarpum (Späth) Rehder; Viburnum oxycoccos Pursh; Viburnum oxycoccos var. eradiatum Oakes; Viburnum oxycoccos var. subintegrifolium Hook.; Viburnum palustre Raf.; Viburnum pinnina Raf.; Viburnum primina Raf.; Viburnum rosaceum Steud.; Viburnum roseum Steud.

= Viburnum opulus =

Species of flowering plant

Viburnum opulus, commonly known as the guelder-rose, or guelder rose (/ˈɡɛldər/) and highbush cranberry is a Eurasian and North American species of flowering plant in the family Viburnaceae.

== Description ==
Viburnum opulus is a deciduous shrub growing to 4–5 m (13–16 ft) tall. The leaves are opposite, three-lobed, 5–10 cm (2–4 in) long and broad, with a rounded base and coarsely serrated margins; they are superficially similar to the leaves of some maples, most easily distinguished by their somewhat wrinkled surface with impressed leaf venation. The leaf buds are green, with valvate bud scales.

The hermaphrodite flowers are white, produced in corymbs 4–11 cm (2–4 in) in diameter at the top of the stems. Each corymb comprises a ring of outer sterile flowers 1.5–2 cm (5/8–3/4 in) in diameter with conspicuous petals, surrounding a center of small (5 mm or 1/4 in) fertile flowers. The flowers are produced in early summer and are pollinated by insects. The fruit is a globose bright red drupe 7–10 mm (1/4–3/8 in) in diameter, containing a single seed. The seeds are dispersed by birds.

Its fruit persists for an average of 200 days, and always bears 1 seed per fruit. Fruits average 88.0% water, and their dry weight includes 17.3% carbohydrates and 1.3% lipids.

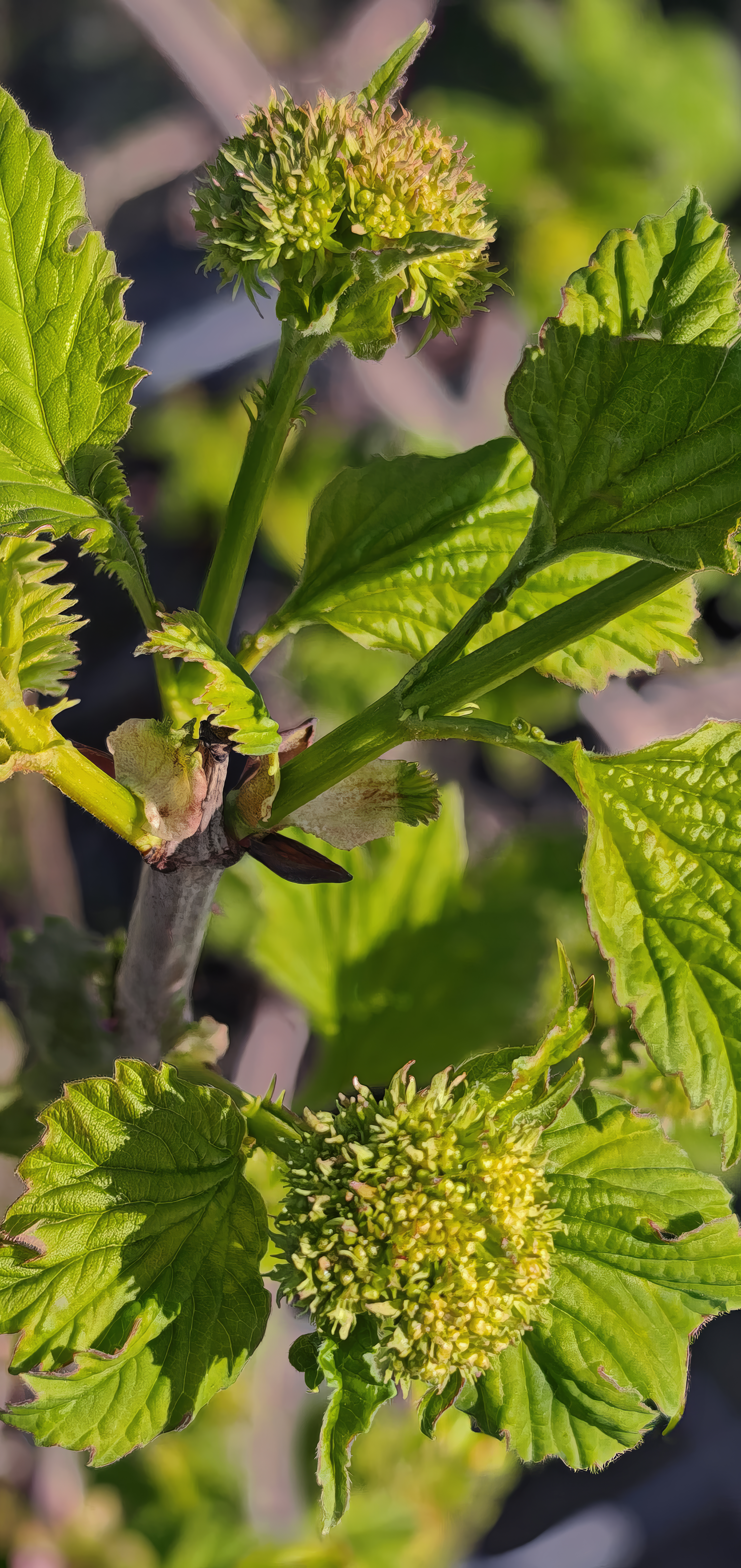
Immature inflorescences

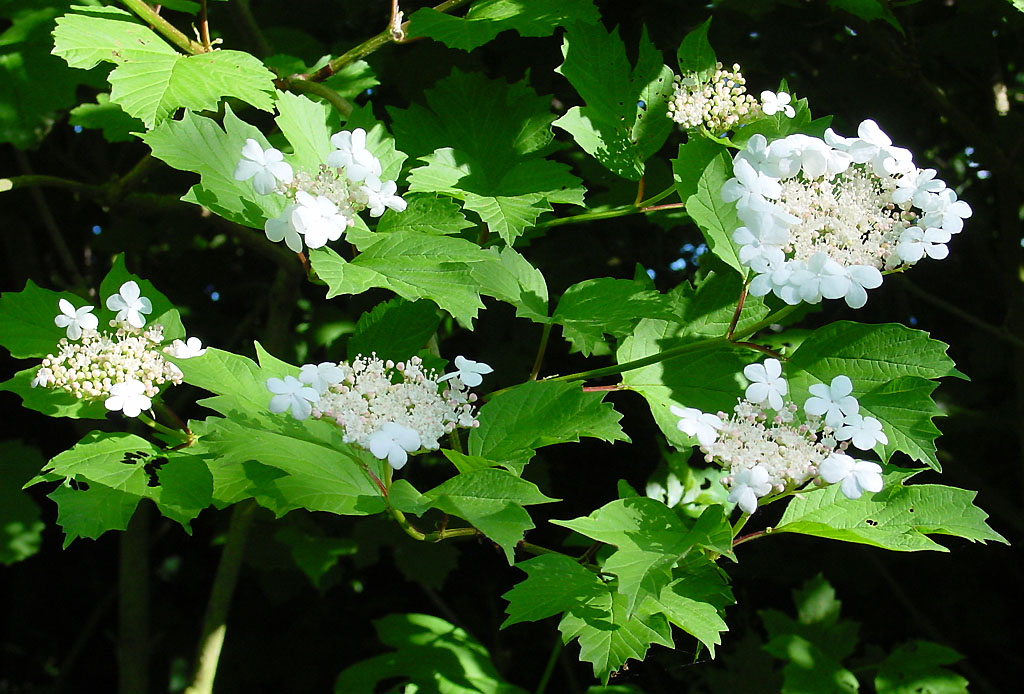
Leaves and flowers

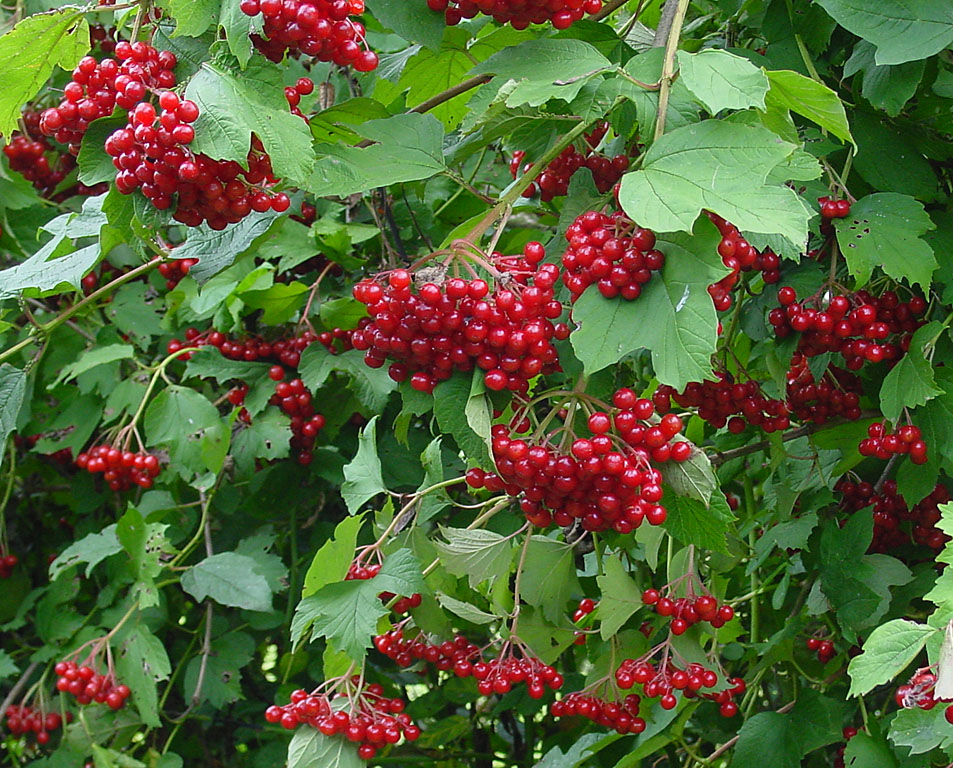
Foliage and fruit

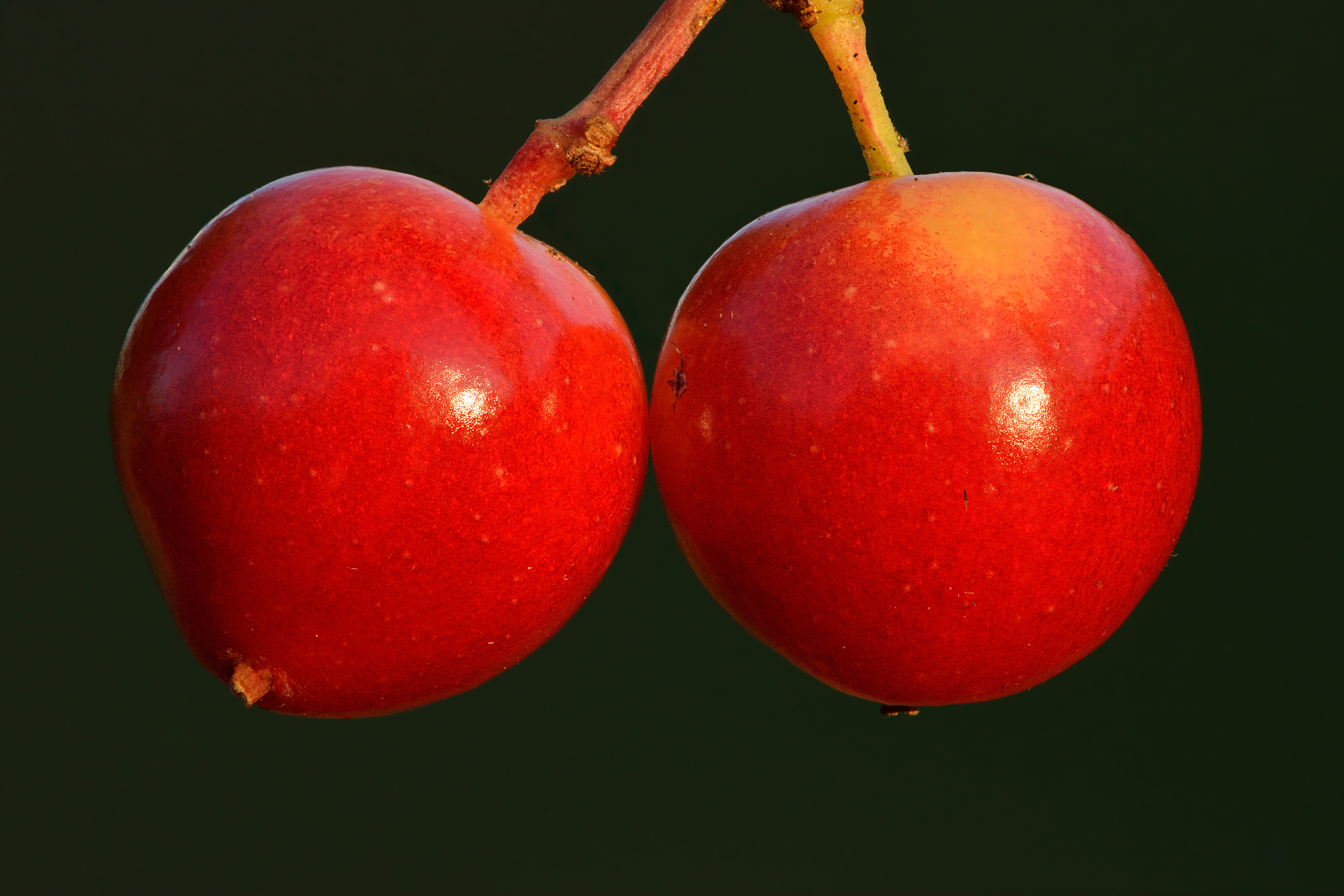
Fruits close-up

== Names ==
The common name 'guelder rose' relates to the Dutch province of Gelderland, where a popular cultivar, the snowball tree, supposedly originated. Other common names include water elder, cramp bark, snowball tree, common snowball, and European cranberrybush, though this plant is not closely related to the cranberry. Some botanists also include the North American species Viburnum trilobum as V. opulus var. americanum Ait., or as V. opulus subsp. trilobum (Marshall) Clausen.

== Phylogeny ==
Viburnum opulus is a member of the Viburnum genus which contains 160 to 170 species. It is classified in the subsection Opulus, which usually contains five species. Phylogenetic analyses suggest the following relationship between those species:

- clade containing sections Sambucina, Lobata, Coriacea, and Succodontotinus
- Opulus sect.
  - - V. edule (squashberry, mooseberry)—Canada and northern parts of the US
    - V. koreanum (Korean viburnum)—China, Korea
  - - - V. sargentii (tianmu viburnum)—northeastern Asia
      - V. opulus
    - V. trilobum (high bush viburnum)—northern North America

== Distribution and habitat ==
Viburnum opulus var. opulus is native to Europe, northern Africa, and central Asia. It is naturalised in North America. Viburnum opulus var. americanus is native to North America.

== Cultivation ==
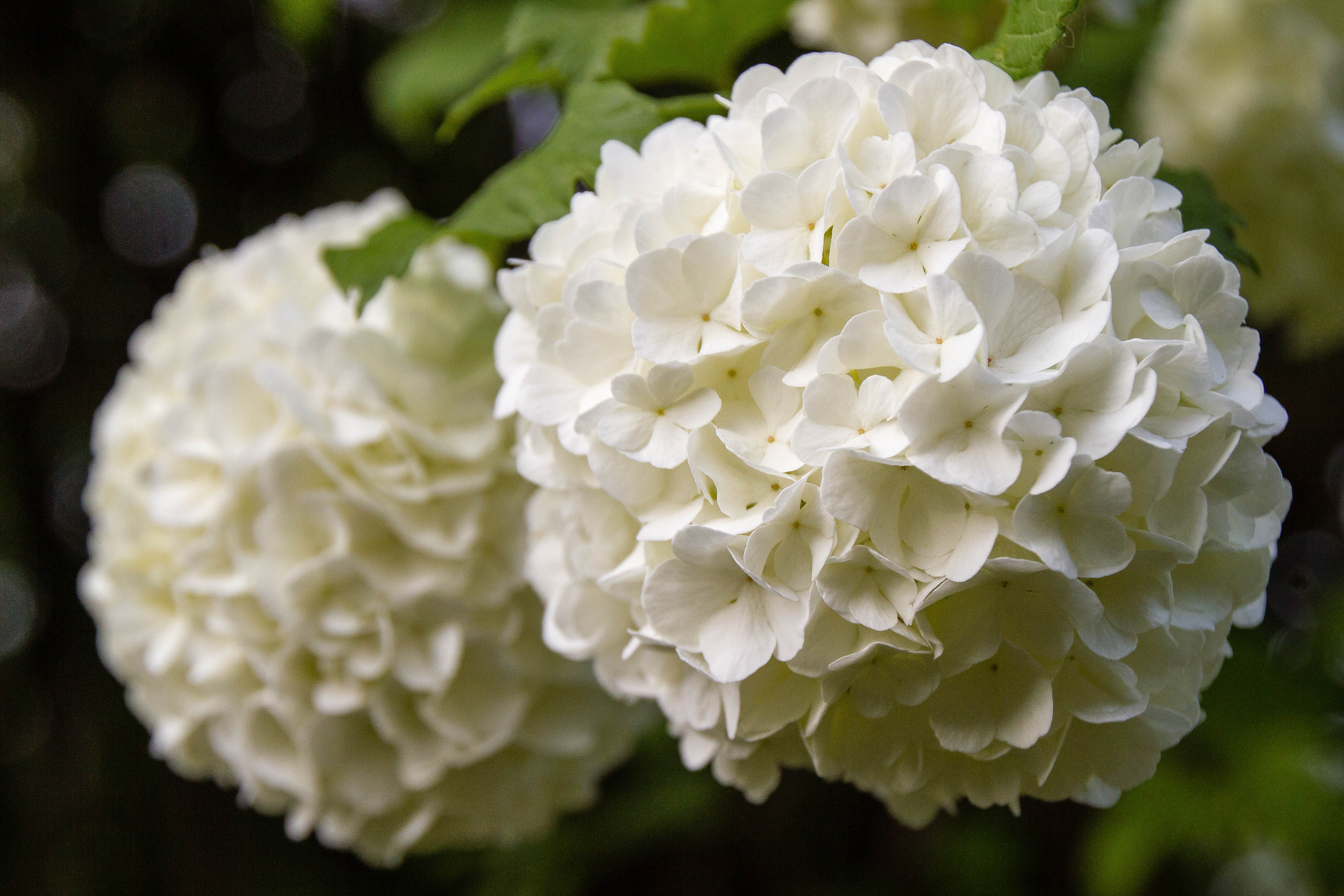
'Roseum'

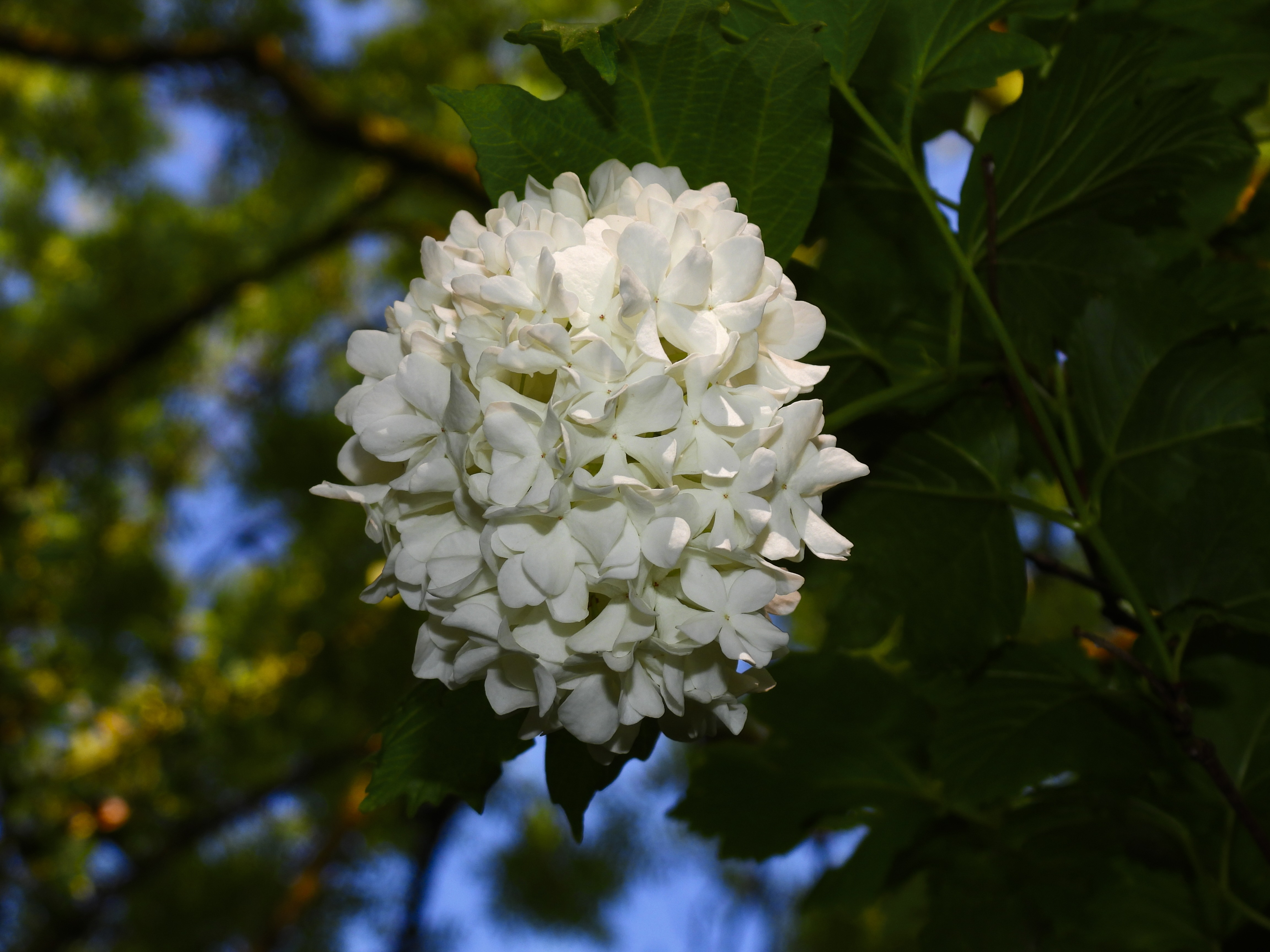
A white bunch of hanging inflorescence of the guelder-rose (Viburnum opulus).

Viburnum opulus is grown as an ornamental plant for its flowers and berries, growing best on moist, moderately alkaline soils, though tolerating most soil types well. Several cultivars have been selected, including 'Roseum', in which all the flowers are only of the larger sterile type, with globular flower heads.

The shrub is also cultivated as a component of hedgerows, cover plantings, and as part of other naturalistic plantings in its native regions.

The cultivars 'Notcutt's Variety', 'Roseum' and the yellow-fruited 'Xanthocarpum' have gained the Royal Horticultural Society's Award of Garden Merit.

== Toxicity and uses ==
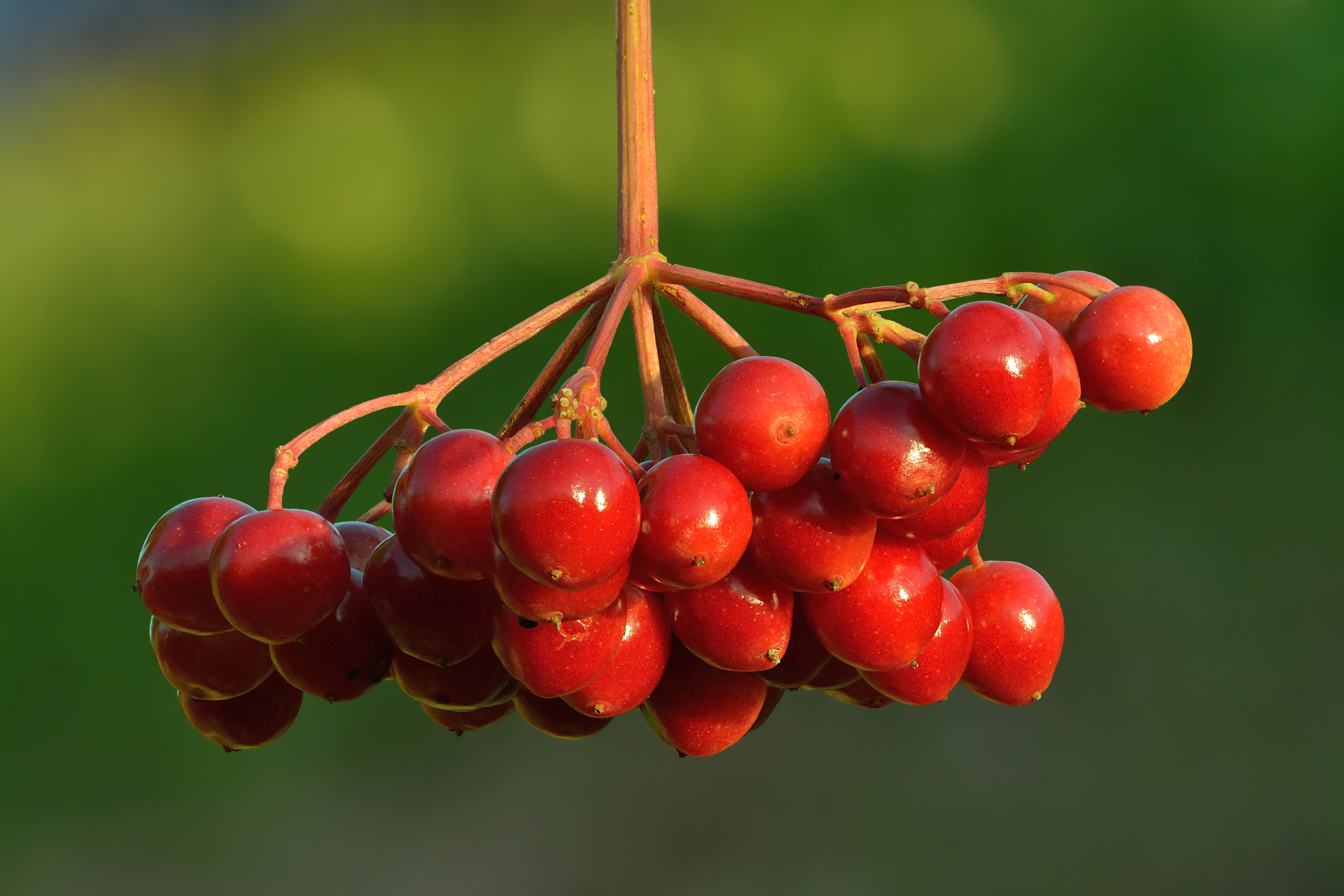
Fruit cluster

The fruit is edible in small quantities, with a very bitter taste; it can be used to make jam. It is however mildly toxic, and may cause vomiting or diarrhea if eaten in large amounts. The ripe fruit is often ignored by birds and avoided by humans due to a foul smell emitted when crushed, described by some as "musty socks" or "urine and vomit".

The term 'cramp bark' is related to the bark's use in traditional medicine for cramps, but there is no scientific evidence of its effectiveness for this use or any other.

== In culture ==
V. opulus depicted on the flag of the president of Ukraine

Mentions of the viburnum can be found throughout Ukrainian folklore such as songs, decorative art, Ukrainian embroidery, and poetry. Its symbolic roots can be traced to the Slavic paganism of millennia ago. According to a legend, kalyna was associated with the birth of the Universe, the so-called Fire Trinity: the Sun, the Moon, and the Star. Its berries symbolize one's home and native land, blood, and family roots. Kalyna is often depicted on Ukrainian embroidery: ritual cloths and shirts. In Slavic paganism kalyna also represents the beauty of a young lady, which rhymes well in the Ukrainian language: ka-ly-na – div-chy-na. The song "Chervona Kalyna" was the anthem of the Ukrainian Sich Riflemen and the Ukrainian Insurgent Army; along with these national liberating movements in 20th century guelder rose was established as a symbol of riflemen honor, and state independence.

In Russia the Viburnum fruit is called kalina (калина) and is commonly found in folklore. Kalina derived in Russian language from kalit' or raskalyat', which means "to make red-hot". The red fiery color of the berries represents beauty in Russian culture and together with sweet raspberries it symbolises the passionate love of a beautiful maiden, since berries were always an erotic symbol in Russia. The bitter side of the red fruit also symbolizes love separation in Russian folk culture. The name of the Russian song Kalinka is a diminutive of Kalina. Viburnum opulus is also an important symbol of the Russian national ornamental wood painting handicraft style called Khokhloma.

In Romanian, which has been influenced by East Slavic culture, Viburnum opulus is called călin. Călin is also used as both a given name and a surname.

== Bibliography ==
- Ehrlén, Johan; Eriksson, Ove (1991). "Phenological variation in fruit characteristics in vertebrate-dispersed plants". Oecologia. 86 (4): 463–470. doi:10.1007/BF00318311. ISSN 0029-8549. PMID 28313326.
