= Călin Moldovan =

Călin Moldovan may refer to:

- Călin Ion Moldovan, Romanian former footballer, who played as a midfielder, currently a football manager.
- Călin Cristian Moldovan, Romanian former footballer, who played as a goalkeeper, currently a football manager.
