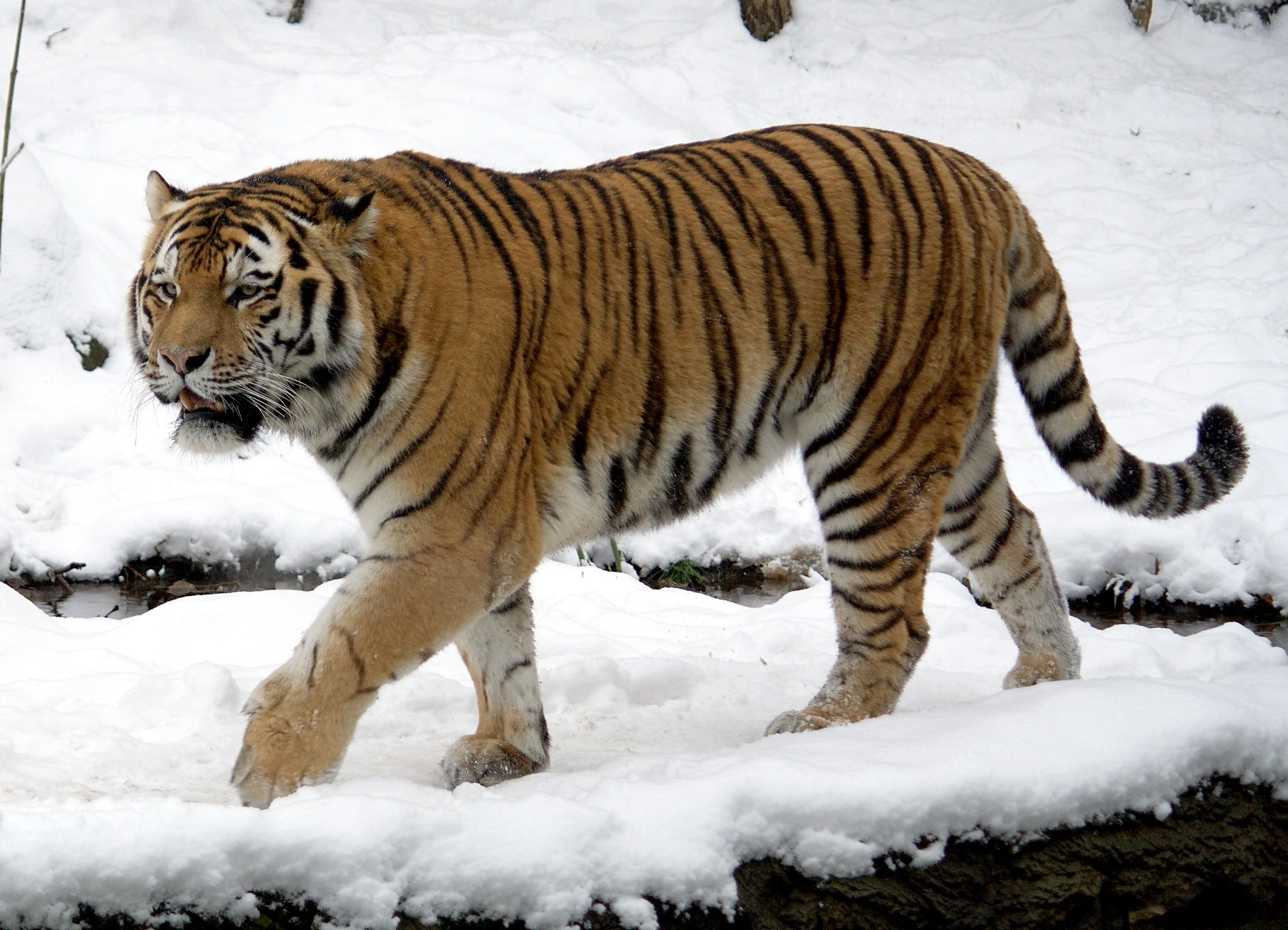
- Siberian tiger at the Leipzig Zoological Garden

Scientific classification
- Kingdom: Animalia
- Phylum: Chordata
- Class: Mammalia
- Order: Carnivora
- Family: Felidae
- Genus: Panthera
- Species: P. tigris
- Subspecies: P. t. tigris
- Population: Siberian tiger
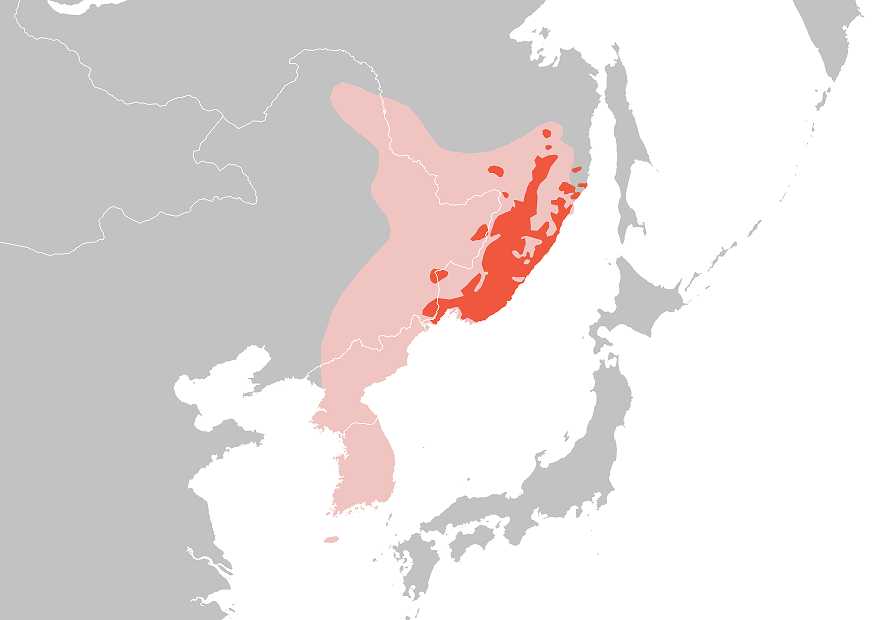
- Siberian tiger distribution Modern-day range Range in the late 1800s

= Siberian tiger =

Tiger population in Northeast Asia

The Siberian tiger or Amur tiger is a population of the tiger subspecies Panthera tigris tigris native to Northeast China, the Russian Far East, and possibly North Korea. It once ranged throughout the Korean Peninsula, but was eradicated in the area during the period of Japanese rule between 1910 and 1945, and currently inhabits mainly the Sikhote-Alin mountain region in the southwest of Primorsky Krai in the Russian Far East. In 2005, there were 331–393 adult and subadult Siberian tigers in this region, with a breeding adult population of about 250 individuals. The population had been stable for more than a decade because of intensive conservation efforts, but partial surveys conducted after 2005 indicate that the Russian tiger population was declining. An initial census held in 2015 indicated that the Siberian tiger population had increased to 480–540 individuals in the Russian Far East, including 100 cubs. This was followed up by a more detailed census, which revealed there was a total population of 562 wild Siberian tigers in Russia. As of 2014, about 35 individuals were estimated to be in the international border area between Russia and China. As of 2022, about 756 Siberian tigers, including 200 cubs, were estimated to inhabit the Russian Far East.

The Siberian tiger is genetically close to the now-extinct Caspian tiger. Results of a phylogeographic study comparing mitochondrial DNA from Caspian tigers and living tiger populations indicate that the common ancestor of the Siberian and Caspian tigers colonized Central Asia from eastern China, via the Gansu−Silk Road corridor, and then subsequently traversed Siberia eastward to establish the Siberian tiger population in the Russian Far East. The Caspian and Siberian tiger populations were the northernmost in mainland Asia.

The Siberian tiger was also called "Amur tiger", "Manchurian tiger", "Korean tiger", and "Ussurian tiger", depending on the region where individuals were observed.

== Taxonomy ==
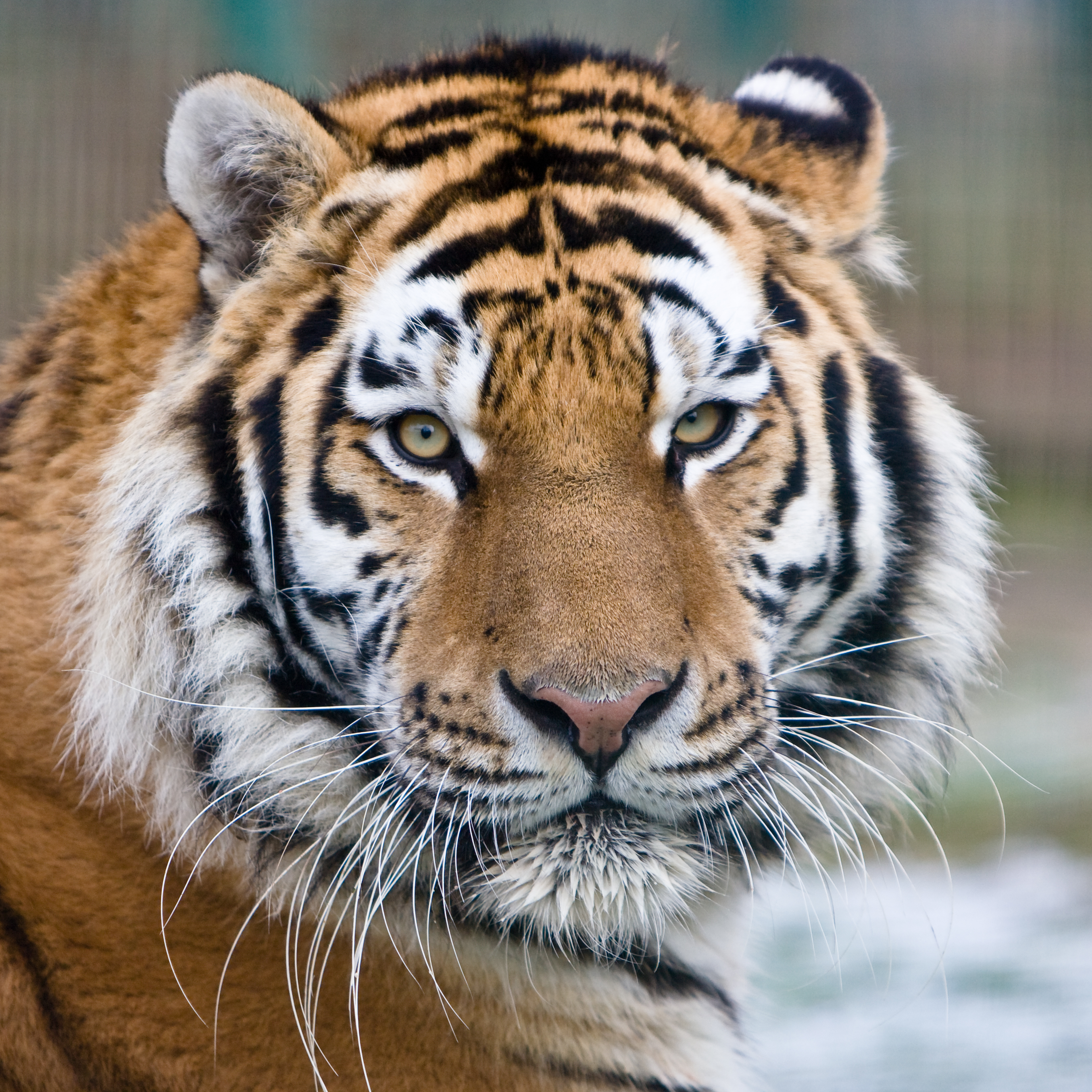
Siberian tiger face

Felis tigris was the scientific name proposed by Carl Linnaeus in 1758 for the tiger. In the 19th century, several tiger specimens were collected in East Asia and described:

- Felis tigris altaicus proposed by Coenraad Jacob Temminck in 1844 were tiger skins with long hairs and dense coats sold in Japan, which originated in Korea, most likely from animals killed in the Altai and Pisihan Mountains.
- Tigris longipilis proposed by Leopold Fitzinger in 1868 was based on a long-haired tiger skin in the Natural History Museum, Vienna.
- Felis tigris var. amurensis proposed by Charles Dode in 1871 was based on tiger skins from the Amur region.
- Felis tigris coreensis by Emil Brass in 1904 was a tiger skin from Korea.

The validity of several tiger subspecies was questioned in 1999. Most putative subspecies described in the 19th and 20th centuries were distinguished on the basis of fur length and colouration, striping patterns, and body size – characteristics that vary widely within populations. Morphologically, tigers from different regions vary little, and gene flow between populations in those regions is considered to have been possible during the Pleistocene. Therefore, it was proposed to recognize only two tiger subspecies as valid, namely Panthera tigris tigris in mainland Asia, and P. t. sondaica in the Greater Sunda Islands and possibly in Sundaland. In 2015, morphological, ecological, and molecular traits of all putative tiger subspecies were analysed in a combined approach. Results support the distinction of the two evolutionary groups: continental and Sunda tigers. The authors proposed recognition of only two subspecies: namely, P. t. tigris comprising the Bengal, Malayan, Indochinese, South China, Siberian and Caspian tiger populations; and P. t. sondaica comprising the Javan, Bali and Sumatran tiger populations.

In 2017, the Cat Specialist Group revised felid taxonomy and now recognizes all the tiger populations in mainland Asia as P. t. tigris.

=== Phylogeny ===
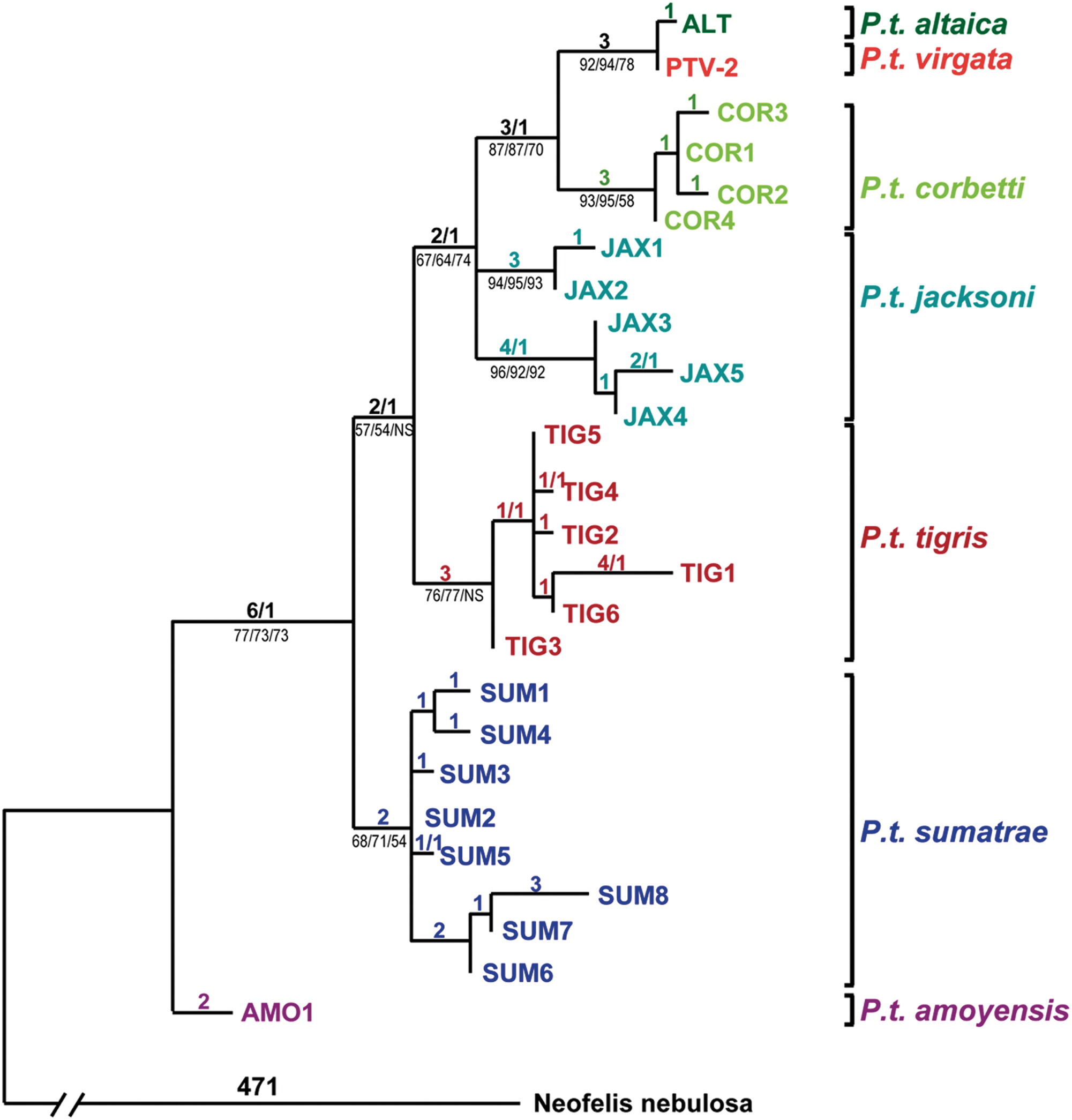
Phylogenetic relationship of tiger populations

Several reports have been published since the 1990s on the genetic makeup of the Siberian tiger and its relationship to other populations. One of the most important outcomes has been the discovery of low genetic variability in the wild population, especially when it comes to maternal or mitochondrial DNA lineages. It seems that a single mtDNA haplotype almost completely dominates the maternal lineages of wild Siberian tigers. On the other hand, captive tigers appear to show higher mtDNA diversity. This may suggest that the subspecies has experienced a very recent genetic bottleneck caused by human pressure, with the founders of the captive population having been captured when genetic variability was higher in the wild.

At the start of the 21st century, researchers from the University of Oxford, U.S. National Cancer Institute, and Hebrew University of Jerusalem collected tissue samples from 20 of 23 Caspian tiger specimens kept in museums across Eurasia. They sequenced at least one segment of five mitochondrial genes and found a low amount of variability of the mitochondrial DNA in Caspian tigers as compared to other tiger subspecies. They re-assessed the phylogenetic relationships of tiger subspecies. They observed a remarkable similarity between Caspian and Siberian tigers, indicating that the Siberian tiger is the genetically closest living relative of the Caspian tiger, which strongly implies a very recent common ancestry. Based on phylogeographic analysis, they suggested that the ancestor of Caspian and Siberian tigers colonized Central Asia less than 10,000 years ago via the Gansu−Silk Road corridor from eastern China, and subsequently traversed eastward to establish the Siberian tiger population in the Russian Far East. The events of the Industrial Revolution may have been the critical factor in the reciprocal isolation of Caspian and Siberian tigers from what was likely a single contiguous population.

Samples of 95 wild Amur tigers were collected throughout their native range to investigate questions related to population genetic structure and demographic history. Additionally, targeted individuals from the North American ex situ population were sampled to assess the genetic representation found in captivity. Population genetic and Bayesian structure analyses clearly identified two populations separated by a development corridor in Russia. Despite their well-documented 20th-century decline, the researchers failed to find evidence of a recent population bottleneck, although genetic signatures of a historical contraction were detected. This disparity in signal may be due to several reasons, including historical paucity in population genetic variation associated with postglacial colonisation and potential gene flow from an extirpated Chinese population. The extent and distribution of genetic variation in captive and wild populations were similar, yet gene variants persisted ex situ that were lost in situ. Overall, their results indicate the need to secure ecological connectivity between the two Russian populations to minimize loss of genetic diversity and overall susceptibility to stochastic events, and support a previous study suggesting that the captive population may be a reservoir of gene variants lost in situ.

In 2013, the whole genome of the Siberian tiger was sequenced and published. Tigers in mainland Asia fall into two clades: the northern clade comprises the Siberian and Caspian tiger populations, and the southern clade all remaining continental tiger populations. A study published in 2018 was based on 32 tiger specimens using whole-genome sequencing for analysis. Results support six monophyletic tiger clades and indicate that the most recent common ancestor lived about 110,000 years ago.

== Characteristics ==
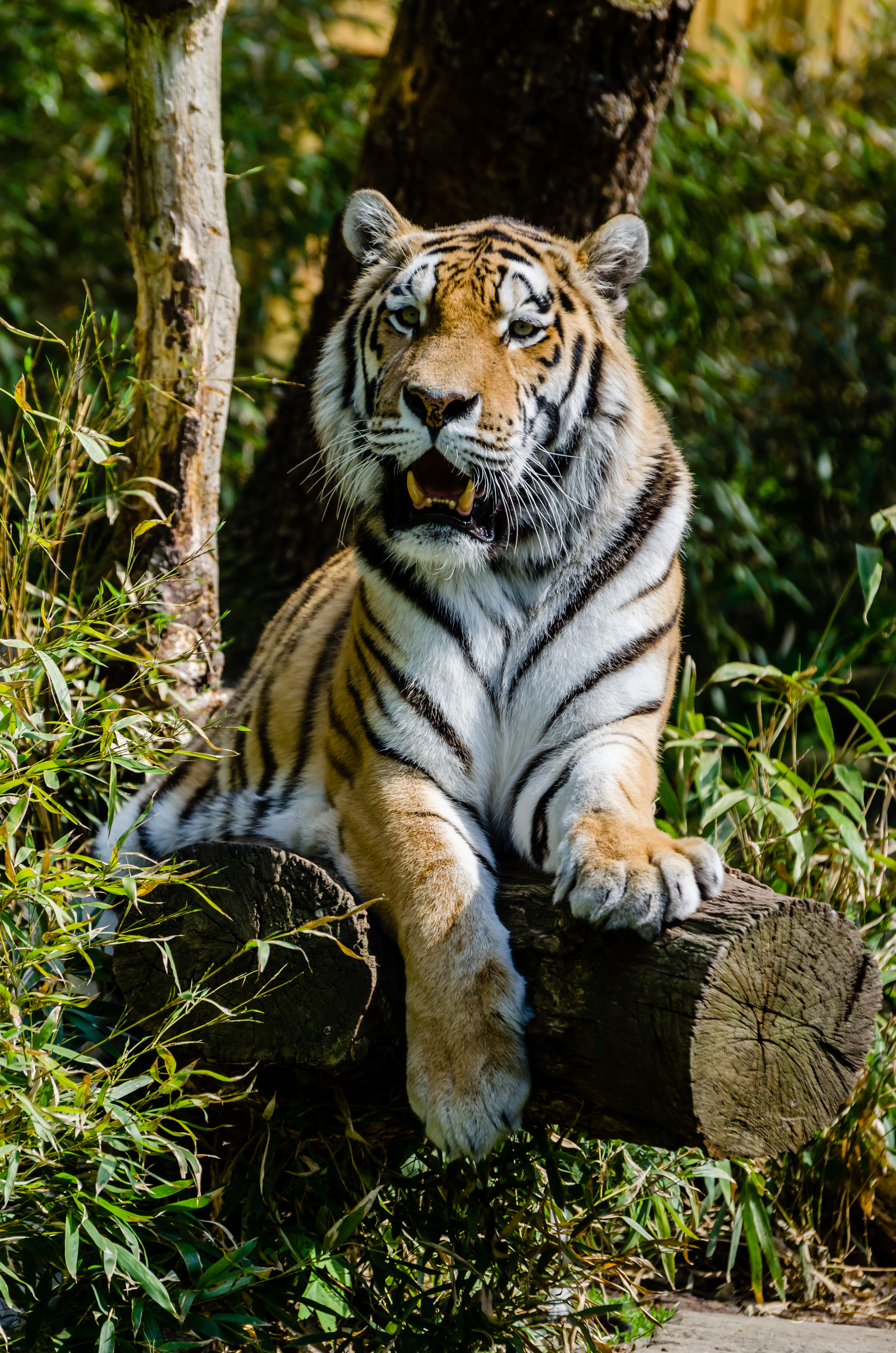
Captive Siberian tiger at Münster Zoo

The tiger is reddish-rusty, or rusty-yellow in colour, with narrow black transverse stripes. The body length is not less than 150 cm (59 in), condylobasal length of skull 250 mm (9.8 in), zygomatic width 180 mm (7.1 in), and length of upper carnassial tooth over 26 mm (1.0 in) long. It has an extended supple body standing on rather short legs with a fairly long tail.

=== Body size ===
In the 1980s, the typical weight range of wild Siberian tigers was indicated as 180 to 306 kg (397 to 675 lb) for males and 100 to 167 kg (220 to 368 lb) for females. Exceptionally large individuals were targeted and shot by hunters.

In 2005, a group of Russian, American, and Indian zoologists published an analysis of historical and contemporary data on body weights of wild and captive tigers, both female and male, across all subspecies. The data used include the weights of tigers that were older than 35 months and measured in the presence of the authors. Their comparison with historical data indicates that up to the first half of the 20th century, both male and female Siberian tigers were on average heavier than post-1970 ones. The average historical wild male Siberian tiger weighed 215.3 kg (475 lb) and the female 137.5 kg (303 lb); the contemporary wild male Siberian tiger weighs 176.4 kg (389 lb) on average with an asymptotic limit being 222.3 kg (490 lb); a wild female weighs 117.9 kg (260 lb) on average. Historical Siberian tigers and Bengal tigers were the largest ones, whereas contemporary Siberian tigers are on average lighter than Bengal tigers. The reduction of the body weight of today's Siberian tigers may be explained by concurrent causes, namely the reduced abundance of prey because of illegal hunting and the fact that the individuals were usually sick or injured and captured in a conflict situation with people.

Measurements taken by scientists of the Siberian Tiger Project in the Sikhote-Alin range from 178 to 208 cm (70 to 82 in) in head and body length measured in straight line, with an average of 195 cm (77 in) for males; and for females ranging from 167 to 182 cm (66 to 72 in) with an average of 174 cm (69 in). The average tail measures 99 cm (39 in) in males and 91 cm (36 in) in females. The longest male measured 309 cm (122 in) in total length, including a tail of 101 cm (40 in) and with a chest girth of 127 cm (50 in). The longest female measured 270 cm (110 in) in total length, including tail of 88 cm (35 in), and with a chest girth of 108 cm (43 in). A male captured by members of the Siberian Tiger Project weighed 206 kg (454 lb), and the largest radio-collared male weighed 212 kg (467 lb).

The Siberian tiger is often considered to be the largest tiger. A wild male, killed in Manchuria by the Sungari River in 1943, reportedly measured 350 cm (140 in) "over the curves", with a tail length of about 1 m (3 ft 3 in). It weighed about 300 kg (660 lb). Dubious sources mention weights of 318 and 384 kg (701 and 847 lb) and even 408 kg (899 lb).

=== Skull ===
The skull of the Siberian tiger is characterized by its large size. The facial region is very powerful and very broad in the region of the canines. The skull prominences, especially in the sagittal crest and crista occipitalis, are very high and strong in old males, and often much more massive than usually observed in the biggest skulls of Bengal tigers. The size variation in skulls of Siberian tigers ranges from 331 to 383 mm (13.0 to 15.1 in) in nine individuals measured. A female skull is always smaller and never as heavily built and robust as that of a male. The height of the sagittal crest in its middle part reaches as much as 27 mm (1.1 in), and in its posterior part up to 46 mm (1.8 in). Female skulls range from 279.7 to 310.2 mm (11.01 to 12.21 in). The biggest skull of a Siberian tiger from northeast China measured 406 mm (16.0 in) in length, which is about 20–30 mm (0.79–1.18 in) more than the maximum skull lengths of tigers from the Amur region and northern India.

=== Fur and coat ===
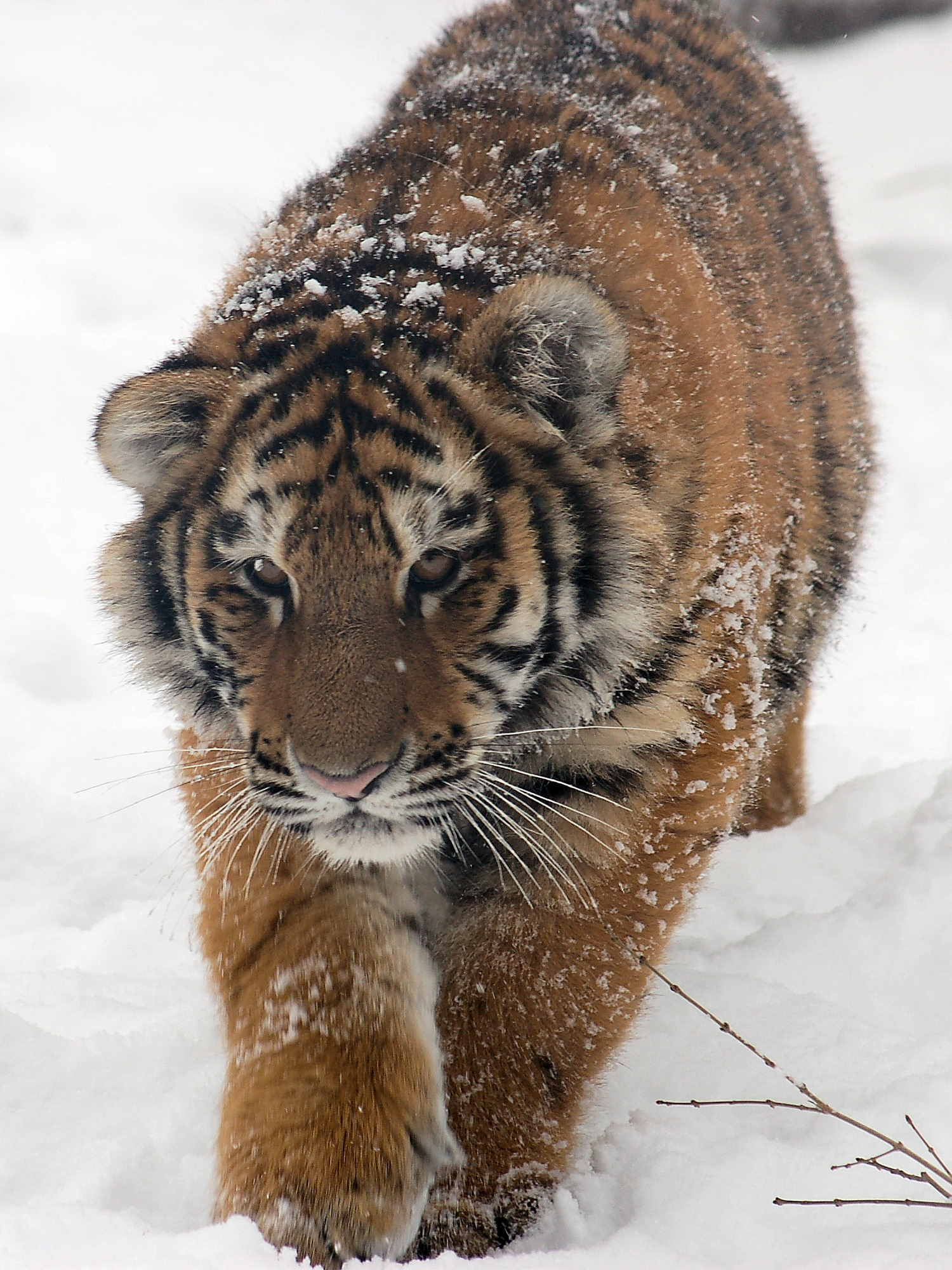
A Siberian tiger cub at the Pittsburgh Zoo

The ground color of Siberian tigers' pelage is often very pale, especially in the winter coat. However, variations within populations may be considerable. Individual variation is also found in form, length, and partly in colour, of the dark stripes, which have been described as being dark brown rather than black.

The fur of the Siberian tiger is moderately thick, coarse, and sparse compared to that of other felids living in the former Soviet Union. Compared to the extinct westernmost populations, the Siberian tiger's summer and winter coats contrast sharply with those of other subspecies. Generally, the coat of Western populations was brighter and more uniform than that of the Far Eastern populations. The summer coat is coarse, while the winter coat is denser, longer, softer, and silkier. The winter fur often appears quite shaggy on the trunk and is markedly longer on the head, almost covering the ears. Siberian and Caspian tigers had the thickest fur amongst tigers.

The whiskers and hair on the back of the head and the top of the neck are also greatly elongated. The background colour of the winter coat is generally less bright and rusty compared to that of the summer coat. Because of the winter fur's greater length, the stripes appear broader with less defined outlines. The summer fur on the back is 15–17 mm (0.59–0.67 in) long, 30–50 mm (1.2–2.0 in) along the top of the neck, 25–35 mm (0.98–1.38 in) on the abdomen, and 14–16 mm (0.55–0.63 in) on the tail. The winter fur on the back is 40–50 mm (1.6–2.0 in), 70–110 mm (2.8–4.3 in) on the top of the neck, 70–95 mm (2.8–3.7 in) on the throat, 60–100 mm (2.4–3.9 in) on the chest and 65–105 mm (2.6–4.1 in) on the abdomen. The whiskers are 90–115 mm (3.5–4.5 in).

== Distribution and habitat ==
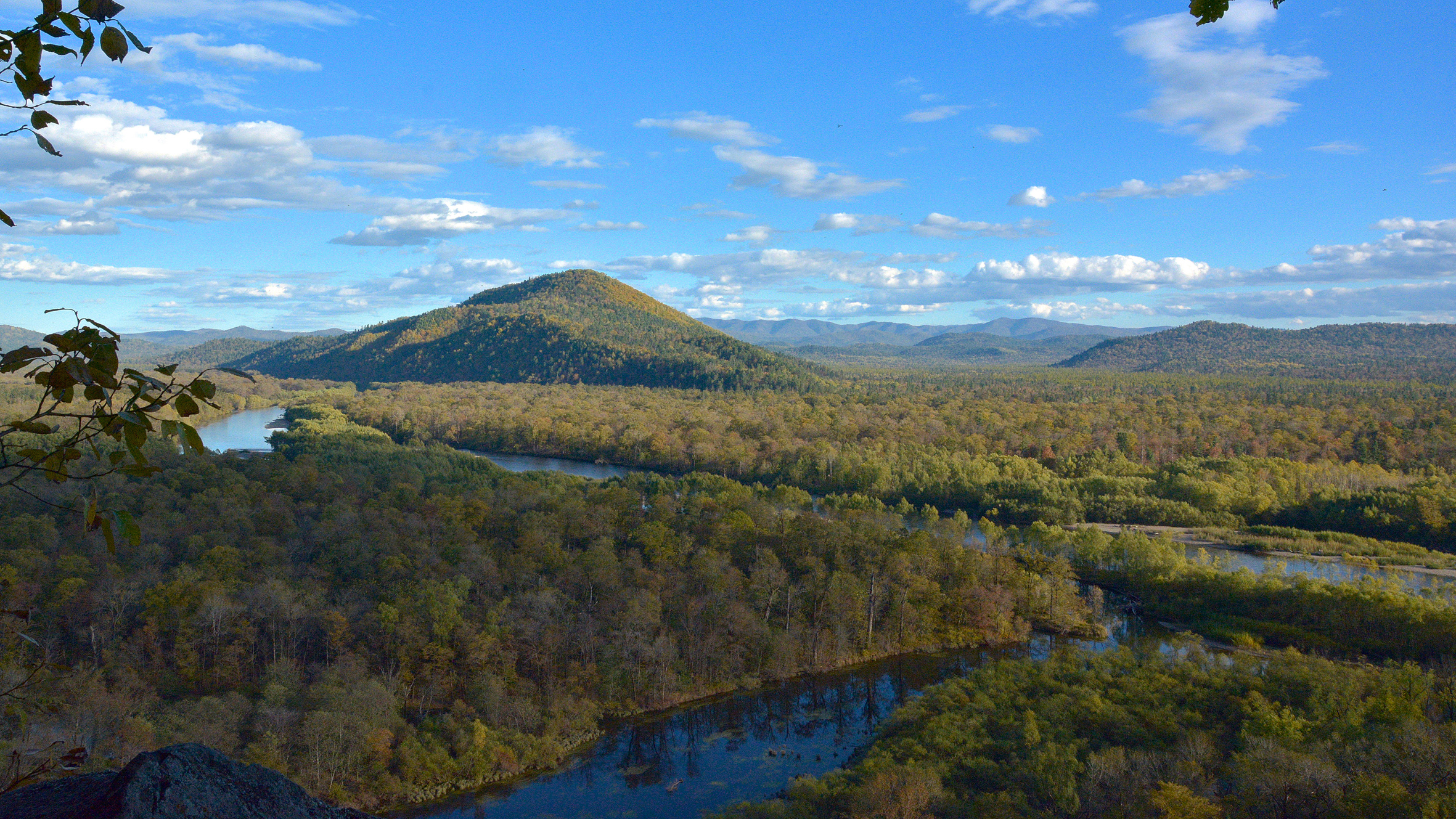
Sikhote-Alin in Primorsky Krai

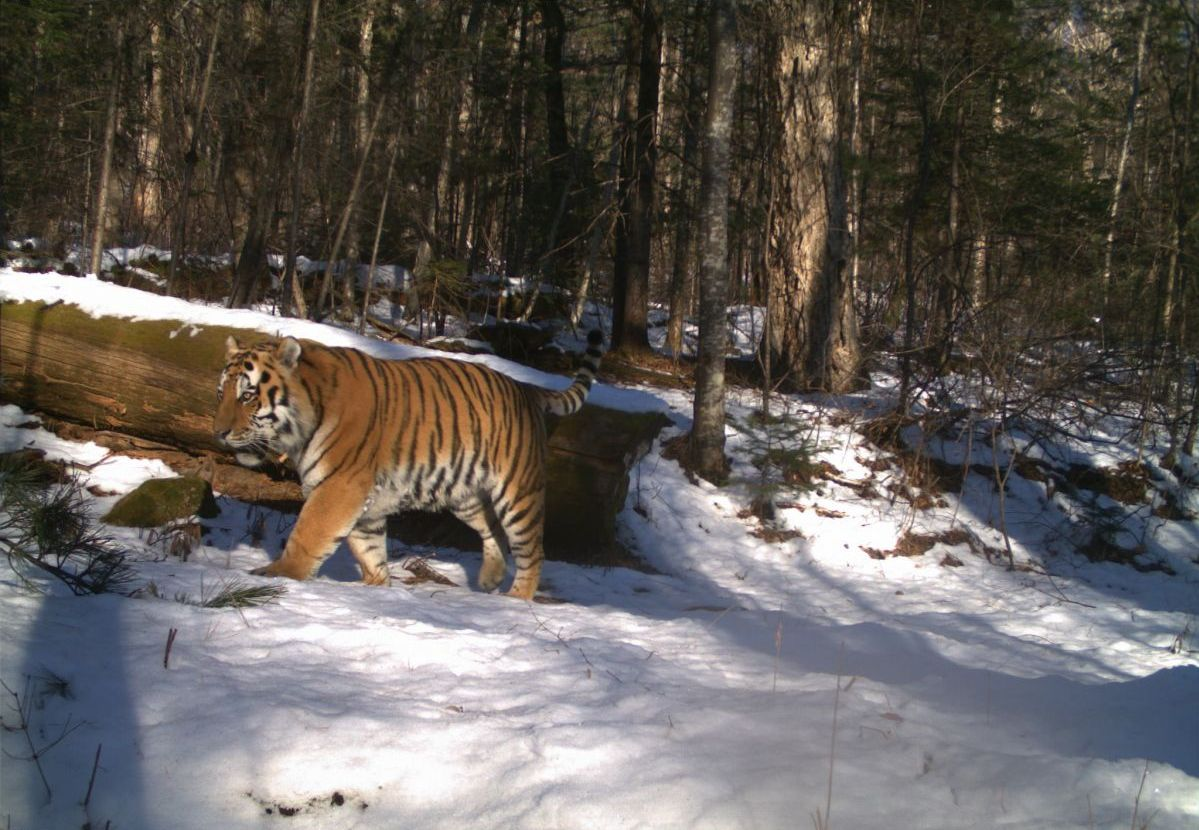
A tiger in Bastak Nature Reserve

The Siberian tiger once inhabited much of the Korean Peninsula, Manchuria, and other parts of northeastern China, the eastern part of Siberia, and the Russian Far East, perhaps as far west as Mongolia and the area of Lake Baikal, where the Caspian tiger also reportedly occurred. During the late Pleistocene and Holocene, it was likely connected to the South China tiger population through corridors in the Yellow River basin, before humans interrupted gene flow.

Today, its range stretches south to north for almost 1,000 km (620 mi) the length of Primorsky Krai and into southern Khabarovsk Krai east and south of the Amur River. It also occurs within the Greater Xing'an Range, which crosses into Russia from China at several places in the southwest of Primorsky Krai. This region represents a merger zone of the East Asian temperate broadleaf and mixed forest and the taiga, resulting in a mosaic of forest types that vary in elevation and topography. Key habitats of the Siberian tiger are Korean pine forests with a complex composition and structure.

The faunal complex of the region is represented by a mixture of Asian and boreal life forms. The ungulate complex is represented by seven species, with Manchurian wapiti, Siberian roe deer, and wild boar being the most common throughout the Sikhote-Alin mountains, but rare in higher altitude spruce-fir forests. Sika deer are restricted to the southern half of the Sikhote-Alin mountains. Siberian musk deer and Amur moose are associated with the conifer forests and are near the southern limits of their distribution in the central Sikhote-Alin mountains.

In 2005, the number of Amur tigers in China was estimated at 18–22, and 331–393 in the Russian Far East, comprising a breeding adult population of about 250, fewer than 100 likely to be sub-adults, and more than 20 likely to be less than 3 years of age. More than 90% of the population lived in the Sikhote Alin mountain region. This was followed up by a more detailed census which revealed there was a total population of 562 wild Siberian tigers in Russia. As of 2022, about 756 Siberian tigers, including 200 cubs, were estimated to inhabit the Russian Far East.

An unknown number of tigers survive in the reserve areas around Baekdu Mountain, on the border between China and North Korea, based on tracks and sightings.

In August 2012, a Siberian tiger with four cubs was recorded for the first time in northeastern China's Hunchun National Nature Reserve located in the vicinity of the international borders with Russia and North Korea. Camera-trap surveys carried out in the spring seasons of 2013 and 2014 revealed between 27 and 34 tigers along the China-Russian border. In April 2014, World Wide Fund for Nature personnel captured a video of a tigress with cubs in inland China. The tiger population in the Changbai Mountains dispersed westwards between 2003 and 2016. Camera trap surveys between 2013 and 2018 revealed about 55 Siberian tigers in four forested landscapes in northeastern China: Laoyeling, Zhangguangcai Range, Wandashan, and Lesser Khingan Mountains. Feces, urine, and hair were used to identify 30 tigers in this region genetically. However, only Laoyeling is thought to support a breeding population.

== Ecology and behavior ==
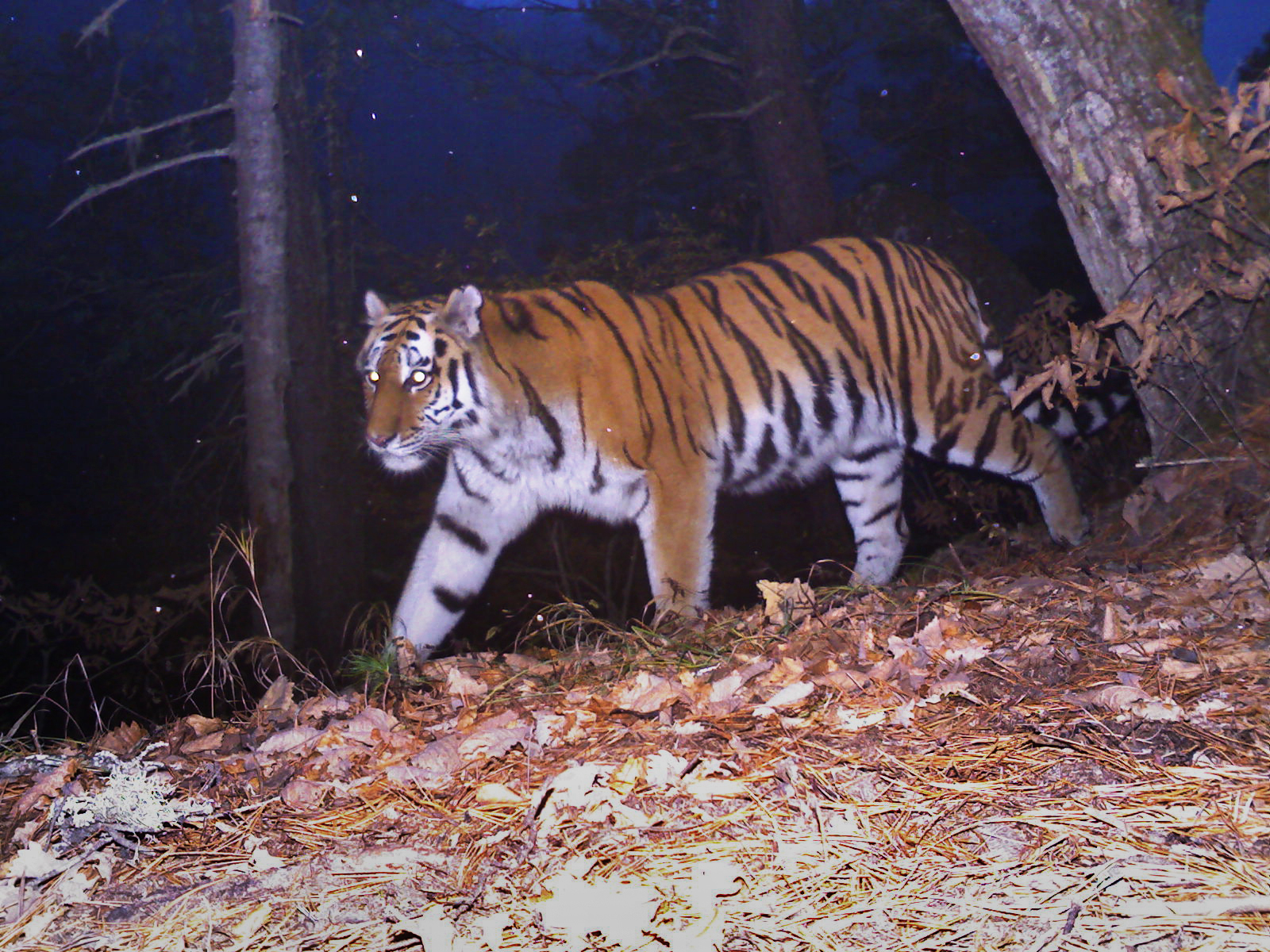
A Siberian tiger photographed by a camera trap

Siberian tigers are known to travel up to 1,000 km (620 mi) over ecologically unbroken country. In 1992 and 1993, the maximum total population density of the Sikhote-Alin tiger population was estimated at 0.62 tigers in 100 km^{2} (39 sq mi). The maximum adult population estimated in 1993 reached 0.3 tigers in 100 km^{2} (39 sq mi), with a sex ratio of averaging 2.4 females per male. These density values were much lower than what had been reported for other subspecies at the time. In 2004, dramatic changes in land tenure, population density, and reproductive output in the core area of the Sikhote-Alin Zapovednik Siberian Tiger Project were detected, suggesting that when tigers are well protected from human-induced mortality for long periods, the adult female population density increases significantly. When more adult females survived, the mothers shared their home ranges with their daughters once the daughters reached maturity. By 2007, the population density of tigers was estimated at 0.8±0.4 tigers in 100 km^{2} (39 sq mi) in the southern part of Sikhote-Alin Zapovednik, and 0.6±0.3 tigers in 100 km^{2} (39 sq mi) in the central part of the protected area.

Siberian tigers share habitat with Amur leopards (P. pardus orientalis), but in the Changbai Mountains have been recorded more often in lower elevations than leopards.

=== Hunting and diet ===
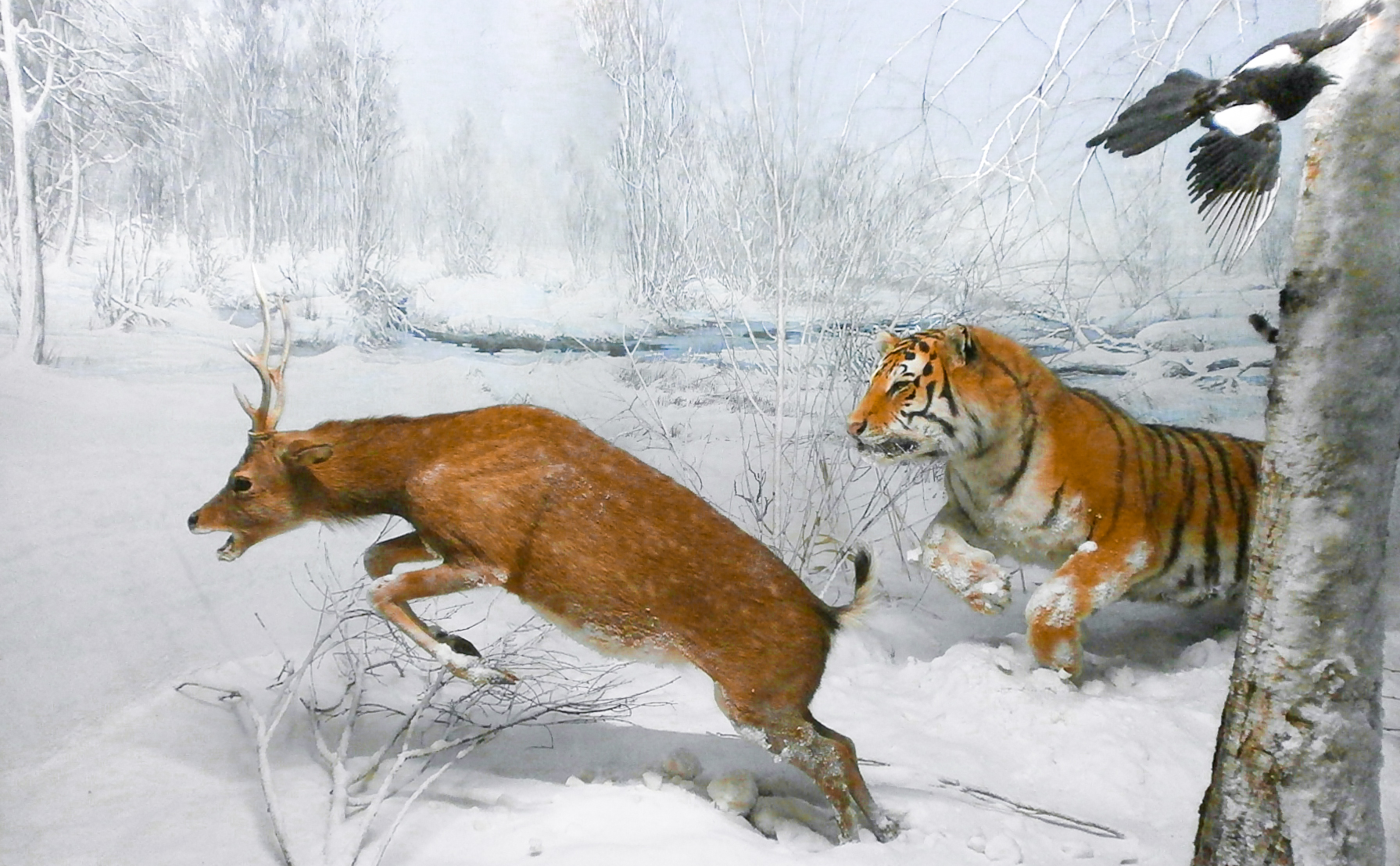
A diorama at the Museo Civico di Storia Naturale di Milano shows a tiger chasing a sika deer

Prey species of the tiger include ungulates such as Manchurian wapiti (Cervus canadensis xanthopygus), Siberian musk deer (Moschus moschiferus), long-tailed goral (Naemorhedus caudatus), moose (Alces alces), Siberian roe deer (Capreolus pygargus) and sika deer (Cervus nippon), wild boar (Sus scrofa), and even sometimes small size Asiatic black bears (Ursus thibetanus) and brown bears (Ursus arctos). Siberian tigers also take smaller prey like hares, rabbits, pikas and even salmon. Scat was collected along the international border between Russia and China between November 2014 and April 2015; 115 scat samples of nine tigers contained foremost remains of wild boar, sika deer, and roe deer.

Between January 1992 and November 1994, 11 tigers were captured, fitted with radio-collars and monitored for more than 15 months in the eastern slopes of the Sikhote-Alin mountain range. Results of this study indicate that their distribution is closely associated with the distribution of Manchurian wapiti, while the distribution of wild boar was not such a strong predictor for tiger distribution. Although they prey on both Siberian roe deer and sika deer, the overlap of these ungulates with tigers was low. The distribution of moose was poorly associated with the distribution of tigers. The distribution of the preferred habitat of key prey species was an accurate predictor of tiger distribution.

Results of a three-year study on Siberian tigers indicate that the mean interval between their kills and estimated prey consumption varied across seasons: during 2009 to 2012, three adult tigers killed prey every 7.4 days in summer and consumed a daily average of 7.89 kg (17.4 lb); in winter they killed more large-bodied prey, made kills every 5.7 days and consumed a daily average of 10.3 kg (23 lb).

=== Interspecific predatory relationships ===
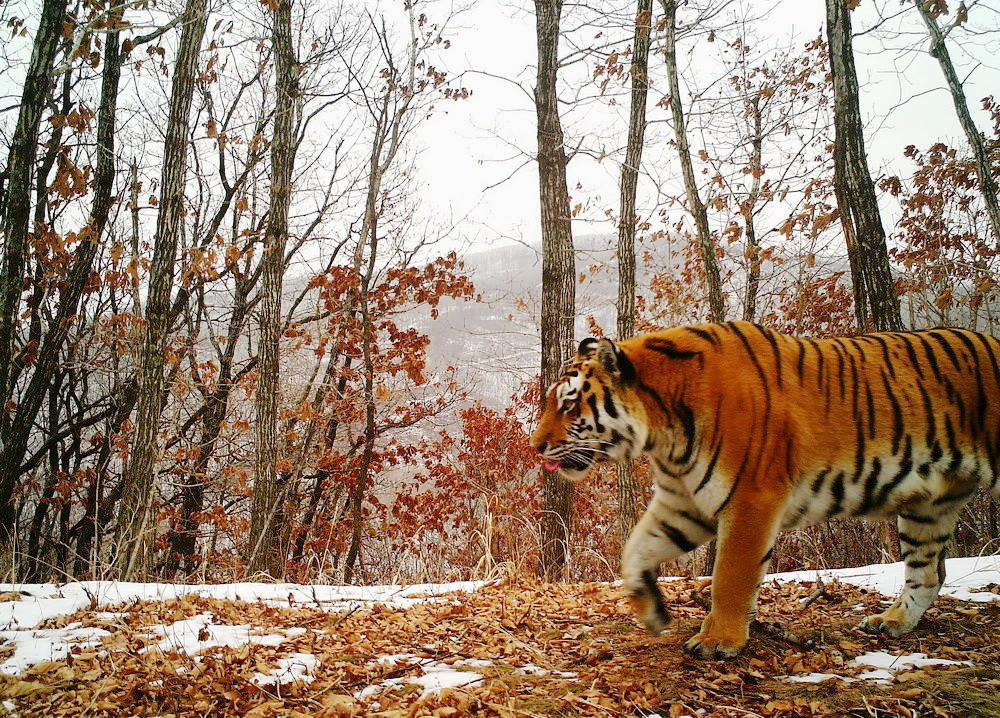
Siberian tiger. Frame from a camera trap

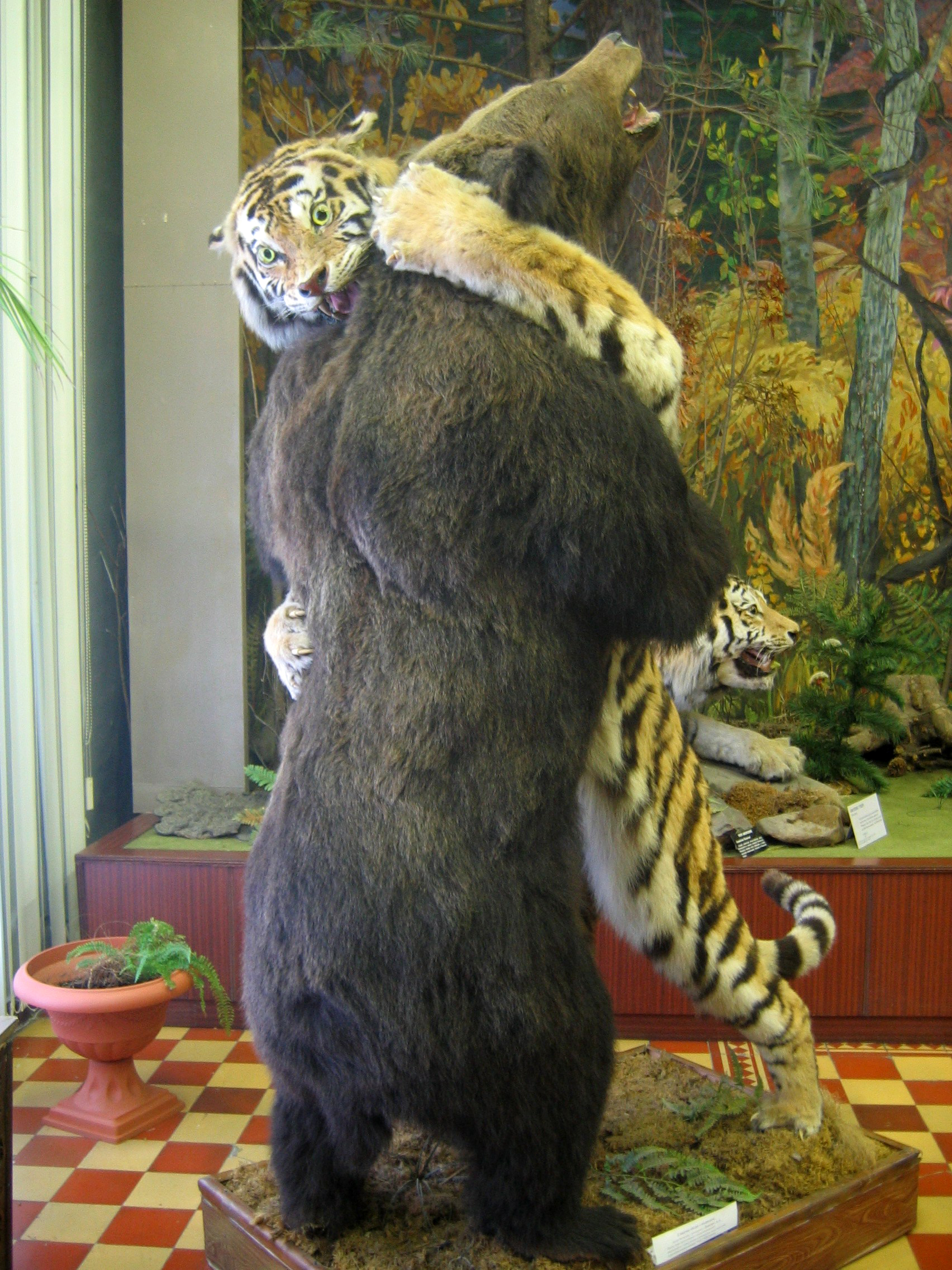
Taxidermy exhibit portraying a tiger fighting a brown bear, Vladivostok Museum

Following a decrease of ungulate populations from 1944 to 1959, 32 cases of Amur tigers attacking both Ussuri brown (Ursus arctos lasiotus) and Ussuri black bears (U. thibetanus ussuricus) were recorded in the Russian Far East, and hair of bears was found in several tiger scat samples. Tigers attack black bears less often than brown bears, as the latter live in more open habitats and are not able to climb trees. In the same time period, four cases of brown bears killing female tigers and young cubs were reported, both in disputes over prey and in self-defense. Tigers mainly feed on the bear's fat deposits, such as the back, hams, and groin.

When Amur tigers prey on brown bears, they usually target young and sub-adult bears, besides small female adults taken outside their dens, generally when lethargic from hibernation. Predation by tigers on denned brown bears was not detected during a study carried out between 1993 and 2002. Ussuri brown bears, along with the smaller black bears constitute 2.1% of the Siberian tiger's annual diet, of which 1.4% are brown bears.

The effect the presence of tigers has on brown bear behavior seems to vary. In the winters of 1970–1973, Yudakov and Nikolaev recorded two cases of bears showing no fear of tigers and another case of a brown bear changing path upon crossing tiger tracks. Other researchers have observed bears following tiger tracks to scavenge tiger kills and to prey on tigers potentially. Despite the threat of predation, some brown bears actually benefit from the presence of tigers by appropriating tiger kills that the bears may not be able to hunt themselves successfully. Brown bears generally prefer to contest the much smaller female tigers. During telemetry research in the Sikhote-Alin Nature Reserve, 44 direct confrontations between bears and tigers were observed, in which bears in general were killed in 22 cases, and tigers in 12 cases. There are reports of brown bears specifically targeting Amur leopards and tigers to abstract their prey. In the Sikhote-Alin reserve, 35% of tiger kills were stolen by bears, with tigers either departing entirely or leaving part of the kill for the bear. Some studies show that bears frequently track down tigers to usurp their kills, with occasional fatal outcomes for the tiger. A report from 1973 describes twelve known cases of brown bears killing tigers, including adult males; in all cases, the tigers were subsequently eaten by the bears.

The relationship between the Amur tiger and the Himalayan bear is not specifically studied. Numerous publications on these species are mainly episodic, and survey data on this issue are collected by different authors in selected areas, which do not give a complete picture of the nature.

Tigers depress wolf (Canis lupus) numbers, either to the point of localized extinction or to such low numbers as to make them a functionally insignificant component of the ecosystem. Wolves appear capable of escaping competitive exclusion from tigers only when human pressure decreases tiger numbers. In areas where wolves and tigers share ranges, the two species typically display a great deal of dietary overlap, resulting in intense competition. Wolf and tiger interactions are well documented in Sikhote-Alin, where, until the beginning of the 20th century, very few wolves were sighted. Wolf numbers may have increased in the region after tigers were largely eliminated during the Russian colonisation in the late 19th century and early 20th century. This is corroborated by native inhabitants of the region claiming that they had no memory of wolves inhabiting Sikhote-Alin until the 1930s, when tiger numbers decreased. Today, wolves are considered scarce in tiger habitat, being found in scattered pockets, and usually seen travelling as loners or in small groups. First-hand accounts on interactions between the two species indicate that tigers occasionally chase wolves from their kills, while wolves will scavenge from tiger kills. Tigers are not known to prey on wolves, though there are four records of tigers killing wolves without consuming them. Released tigers are also said to hunt wolves.

Russian conservationists have used this competitive exclusion of wolves by tigers to convince hunters in the Far East to tolerate the big cats, as they limit ungulate populations less than wolves, and are effective in controlling wolf numbers.

Siberian tigers also compete with the Eurasian lynx (Lynx lynx) and occasionally kill and eat them. Eurasian lynx remains have been found in the stomach contents of Siberian tigers in Russia. In March 2014, a dead lynx discovered in Bastak Nature Reserve bore evidence of predation by a Siberian tiger. The tiger apparently ambushed, pursued, and killed the lynx, but only consumed it partially. This incident marks one of the first documented cases of a tiger preying on a lynx. It indicates that the tiger might have been more intent on eliminating a competitor than on catching prey.

=== Reproduction and life cycle ===
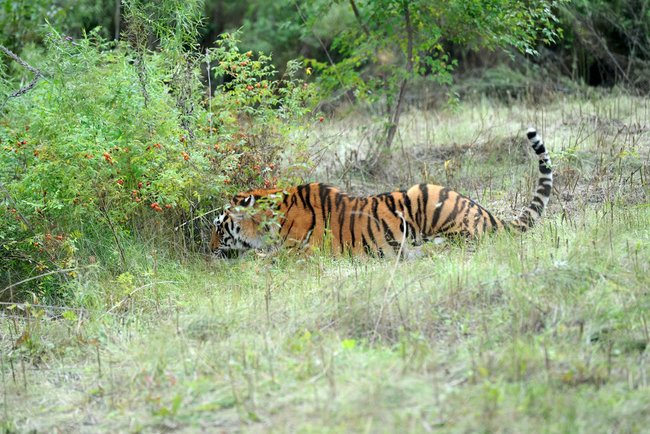
A tiger at the Rehabilitation and Reintroduction Center for Amur (Siberian) Tigers in the village of Alekseevka, Primorsky Krai, Russia

Three orphaned Siberian tigers rescued after poachers killed their mothers are released back to the wild in Russia

Siberian tigers mate at any time of the year. A female signals her receptiveness by leaving urine deposits and scratch marks on trees. She will spend 5 or 6 days with the male, during which she is receptive for three days. Gestation lasts from 3 to 3 1/2 months. Litter size is normally two or four cubs, but there can be as many as six. The cubs are born blind in a sheltered den and are left alone when the female leaves to hunt for food. Cubs are divided equally between sexes at birth. However, by adulthood, there are usually two to four females for every male. The female cubs remain with their mothers longer, and later they establish territories close to their original ranges. Males, on the other hand, travel unaccompanied and range farther earlier in their lives, making them more vulnerable to poachers and other tigers. A Siberian tiger family comprising an adult male, a female, and three cubs was recorded in 2015.

At 35 months of age, tigers are sub-adults. Males reach sexual maturity at the age of 48 to 60 months.

The average lifespan for Siberian tigers ranges from 16 to 18 years. Wild individuals tend to live between 10 and 15 years, while in captivity, individuals may live up to 25 years.

== Threats ==
Results of genetic analysis of 95 wild Siberian tiger samples from Russia revealed that genetic diversity is low, only 27–35 individuals contributed to their genes. Further exacerbating the problem is that more than 90% of the population lives in the Sikhote-Alin mountain region. Tigers rarely move across the development corridor, which separates this sub-population from the much smaller sub-population in the southwest of Primorsky Krai.

The winter of 2006–2007 was marked by heavy poaching. Poaching of tigers and their wild prey species is considered to be driving the decline, although heavy snows in the winter of 2009 could have biased the data. In northern China's Huang Ni He National Nature Reserve, poachers set up foremost snare traps. Still, there is not sufficient personnel to patrol this 75 km^{2} (29 sq mi) area throughout the year. In Hunchun National Nature Reserve, poaching of ungulate species impedes recovery of the tiger population.

=== In the past ===
During the 20th century, poaching and habitat loss resulted in the decline of the species' population.

The Siberian tiger was once common in the Korean Peninsula. It was eradicated during the period of Korea under Japanese rule between 1910 and 1945.

After the dissolution of the Soviet Union, illegal deforestation and bribery of park rangers facilitated the poaching of Siberian tigers. Local hunters had access to a formerly sealed-off, lucrative Chinese market, and this once again put the region's tiger population at risk of extinction. While improvement in the local economy has led to greater resources being invested in conservation efforts, an increase in economic activity has led to an increased rate of development and deforestation. The major obstacle in preserving the tiger is the enormous territory individual tigers require; up to 450 km^{2} (170 sq mi) is needed by a single female and more for a single male.

== Conservation ==
A Siberian tiger at Beijing Wildlife Park, China.

In 1947, the Soviet Union banned hunting of the tiger and further tightened conservation measures in the 1950s. These measures led to an increase in the species' population in the Soviet Union in the 1960s.

During the Mao Zedong era, the People's Republic of China sought to conserve the species due to its endangered status, scientific importance, and diplomatic significance. The tiger was considered as one of China's most "precious and rare animals". Amur tiger populations continued to decline, particularly in northeast China.

By the late 1950s, scientists in China and the Chinese Communist Party viewed the tiger as an endangered species.

In 1962, China prohibited hunting of the species.

Tigers are included on CITES Appendix I, banning international trade. All tiger range states and countries with consumer markets have banned domestic trade as well. At the 14th Conference of the Parties to CITES in 2007, stronger enforcement measures were called for, as well as an end to tiger farming.

In 1992, the Siberian Tiger Project was founded, with the aim of providing a comprehensive picture of the ecology of the Amur tiger and the role of tigers in the Russian Far East through scientific studies. By capturing and outfitting tigers with radio collars, their social structure, land use patterns, food habits, reproduction, mortality patterns, and their relation with other inhabitants of the ecosystem, including humans, are studied. These data compilations will hopefully contribute to minimizing poaching threats because of traditional hunting. The Siberian Tiger Project has been productive in increasing local capacity to address human-tiger conflict with a Tiger Response Team, part of the Russian government's Inspection Tiger, which responds to all tiger-human conflicts; by continuing to enhance the large database on tiger ecology and conservation with the goal of creating a comprehensive Siberian tiger conservation plan; and training the next generation of Russian conservation biologists.

In 1996, China established its first preserve for the species.

In August 2010, China and Russia agreed to enhance conservation and cooperation in protected areas in a transboundary area for Amur tigers. China has undertaken a series of public awareness campaigns, including the celebration of the first Global Tiger Day in July 2010, the International Forum on Tiger Conservation and Tiger Culture, and the China 2010 Hunchun Amur Tiger Culture Festival in August 2010.

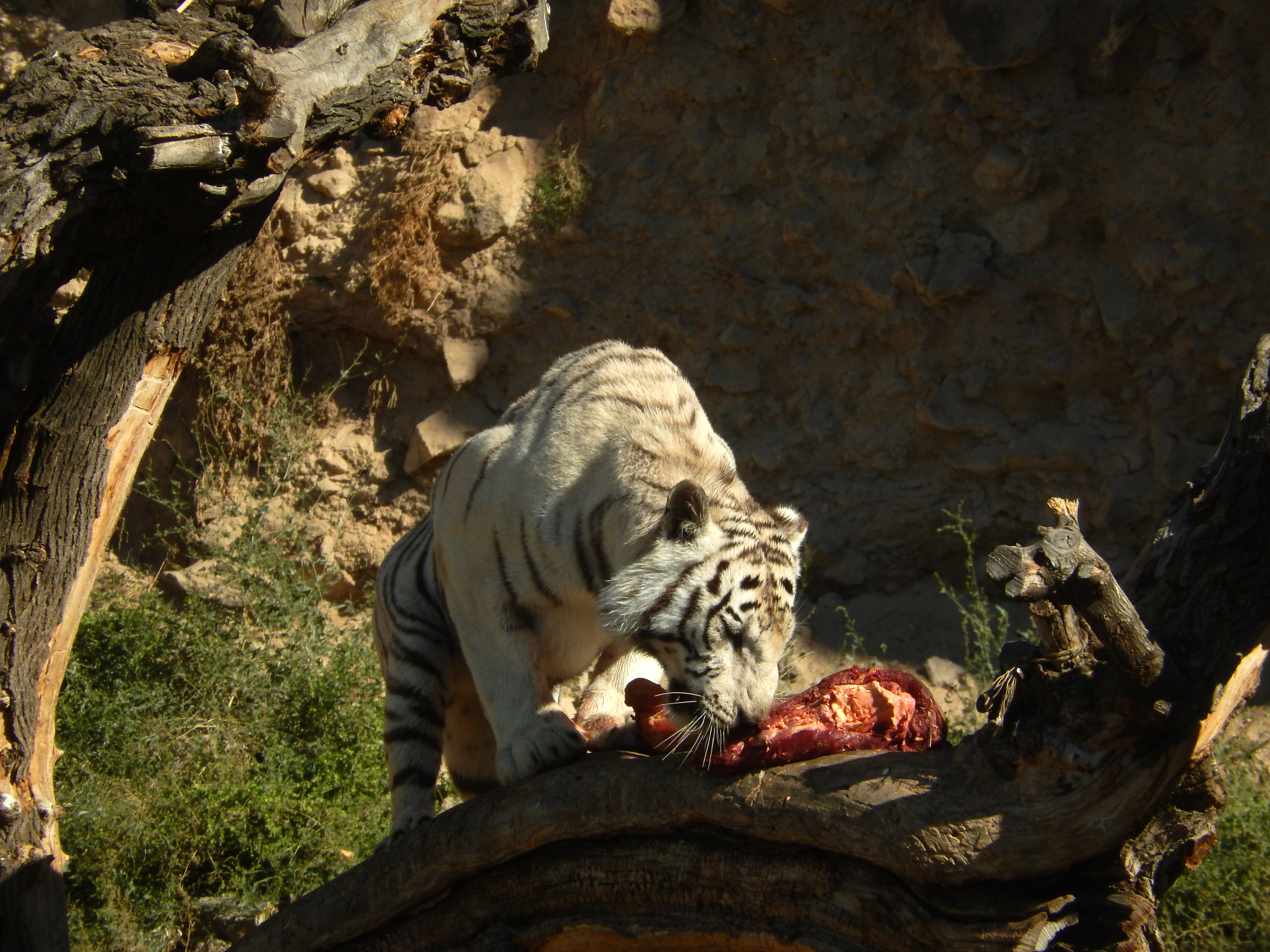
Siberian tiger at Yerevan Zoo, Armenia.

=== Reintroduction ===
Inspired by findings that the Amur tiger is the closest relative of the Caspian tiger, there has been discussion about whether the Amur tiger could be an appropriate subspecies for reintroduction into a safe place in Central Asia. The Amu-Darya Delta was suggested as a potential site for such a project. A feasibility study was initiated to investigate whether the area is suitable and whether such an initiative would receive support from relevant decision makers. A viable tiger population of about 100 animals would require at least 5,000 km^{2} (1,900 sq mi) of large tracts of contiguous habitat with rich prey populations. Such habitat is not presently available in the delta and so cannot be provided in the short term. The proposed region is therefore unsuitable for the reintroduction, at least at this stage of development.

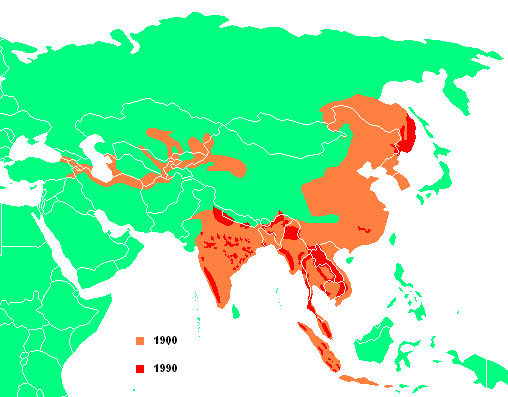
Comparison of the distribution of all tiger subspecies (1900 vs. 1990)

A second possible introduction site in Kazakhstan is the Ili River delta at the southern edge of Lake Balkhash. The delta is situated between the Saryesik-Atyrau Desert and the Taukum Desert and forms a large wetland of about 8,000 km^{2} (3,100 sq mi). Until 1948, the delta was a refuge of the extinct Caspian tiger. Reintroduction of the Siberian tiger to the delta has been proposed. Large populations of wild boar inhabit the swamps of the delta. The reintroduction of the Bukhara deer, which was once an important prey, is under consideration. In 2026, a male and female Amur tiger were released into the Ile-Balkhash State Nature Reserve, becoming Kazakhstan's first wild tigers in 70 years.

In 2010, Russia exchanged two captive Siberian tigers for Persian leopards with the Iranian government, as conservation groups of both countries agreed on reintroducing these animals into the wild within the next five years. This issue is controversial since only 30% of such releases have been successful. In addition, the Siberian tiger is not genetically identical to the Caspian tiger. Climate is also different, with temperatures higher in Iran than in Siberia. Introducing exotic species into a new habitat could inflict irreversible and unknown damage. In December 2010, one of the tigers exchanged died in Eram Zoo in Tehran. Nevertheless, the project has its defenders, and Iran has successfully reintroduced the Persian onager and Caspian red deer.

In 2005, reintroduction was planned as part of the rewilding project at Pleistocene Park in the Kolyma River basin in northern Yakutia, Russia, provided the herbivore population has reached a size warranting the introduction of large predators.

=== In captivity ===
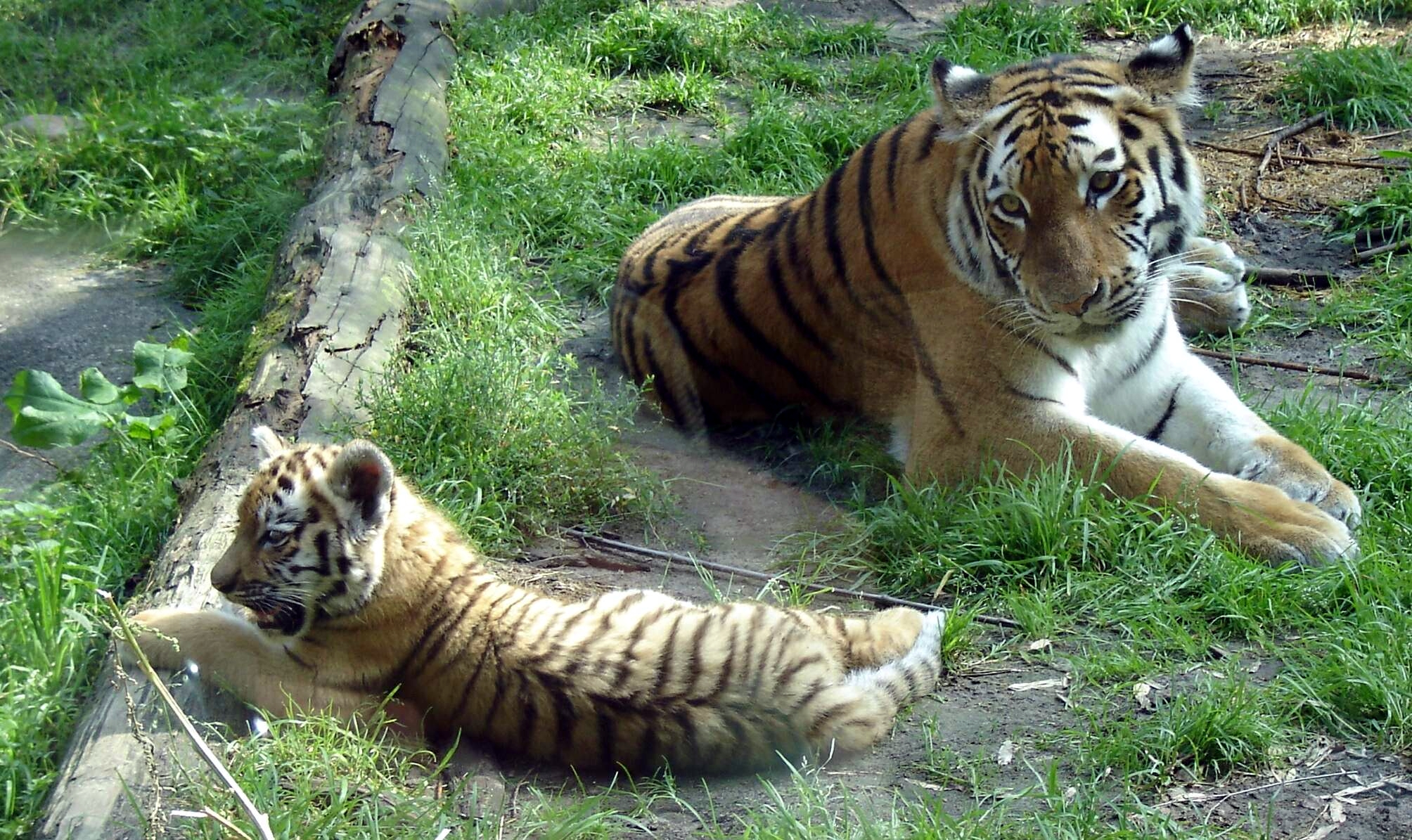
A tigress with cub in captivity in DierenPark Amersfoort

In recent years, captive breeding of tigers in China has accelerated to the point where the captive population of several tiger subspecies exceeds 4,000 animals. Three thousand specimens are reportedly held by 10–20 "significant" facilities, with the remainder scattered among some 200 facilities. This makes China home to the second-largest captive tiger population in the world, after the U.S., which in 2005 had an estimated 4,692 captive tigers. In a census conducted by the U.S.-based Feline Conservation Federation, 2,884 tigers were documented as residing in 468 American facilities.

In 1986, the Chinese government established the world's largest Siberian tiger breeding base, the Harbin Siberian Tiger Park. It was meant to build a Siberian tiger gene pool to ensure the genetic diversity of the tiger. The Park and its existing tiger population would be further divided into two parts, one as the protective species for genetic management and the other as the ornamental species. It was discovered that when the Heilongjiang Northeast Tiger Forest Park was founded, it had only 8 tigers, but according to the current breeding rate of tigers at the park, the worldwide number of wild Siberian tigers will break through 1,000 in late 2010. South Korea expected to receive three tigers pledged for donation in 2009 by Russia in 2011.

== Attacks on humans ==
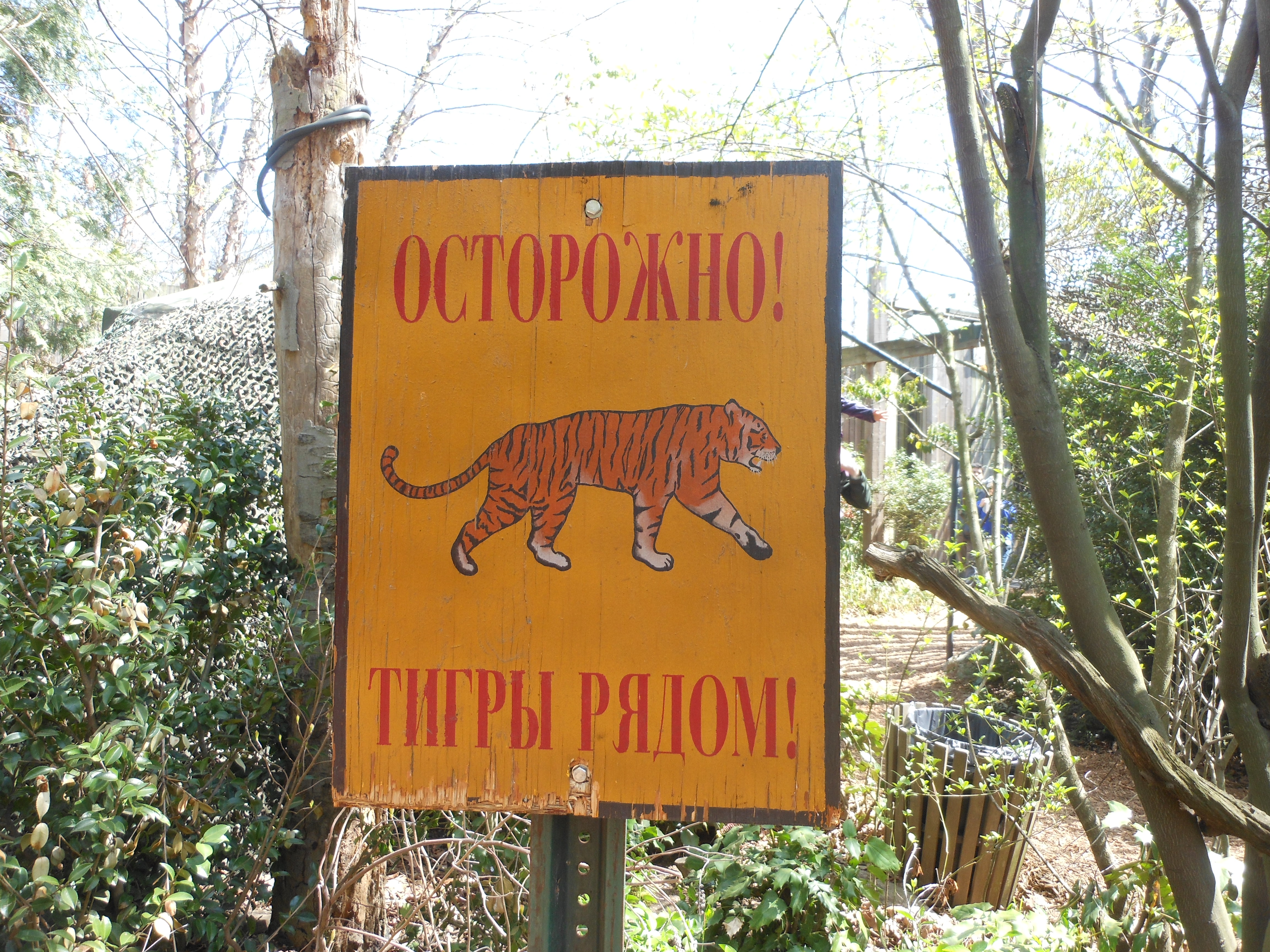
Sign warns Caution! Tigers nearby! (Russian: Осторожно! Тигры рядoм!).

The Siberian tiger very rarely becomes a man-eater. Numerous cases of attacks on humans were recorded in the 19th century, occurring usually in central Asia excluding Turkmenistan, Kazakhstan, and the Far East. Tigers were historically rarely considered dangerous unless provoked, though in the lower reaches of the Syr-Darya, a tiger reportedly killed a woman collecting firewood and an unarmed military officer whilst passing through reed thickets. Attacks on shepherds were recorded in the lower reaches of the Ili. In the Far East, during the middle and late 19th century, attacks on people were recorded. In 1867, on the Tsymukha River, tigers killed 21 men and injured 6 others. In China's Jilin Province, tigers reportedly attacked foresters and coachmen, and occasionally entered cabins and dragged out both adults and children.

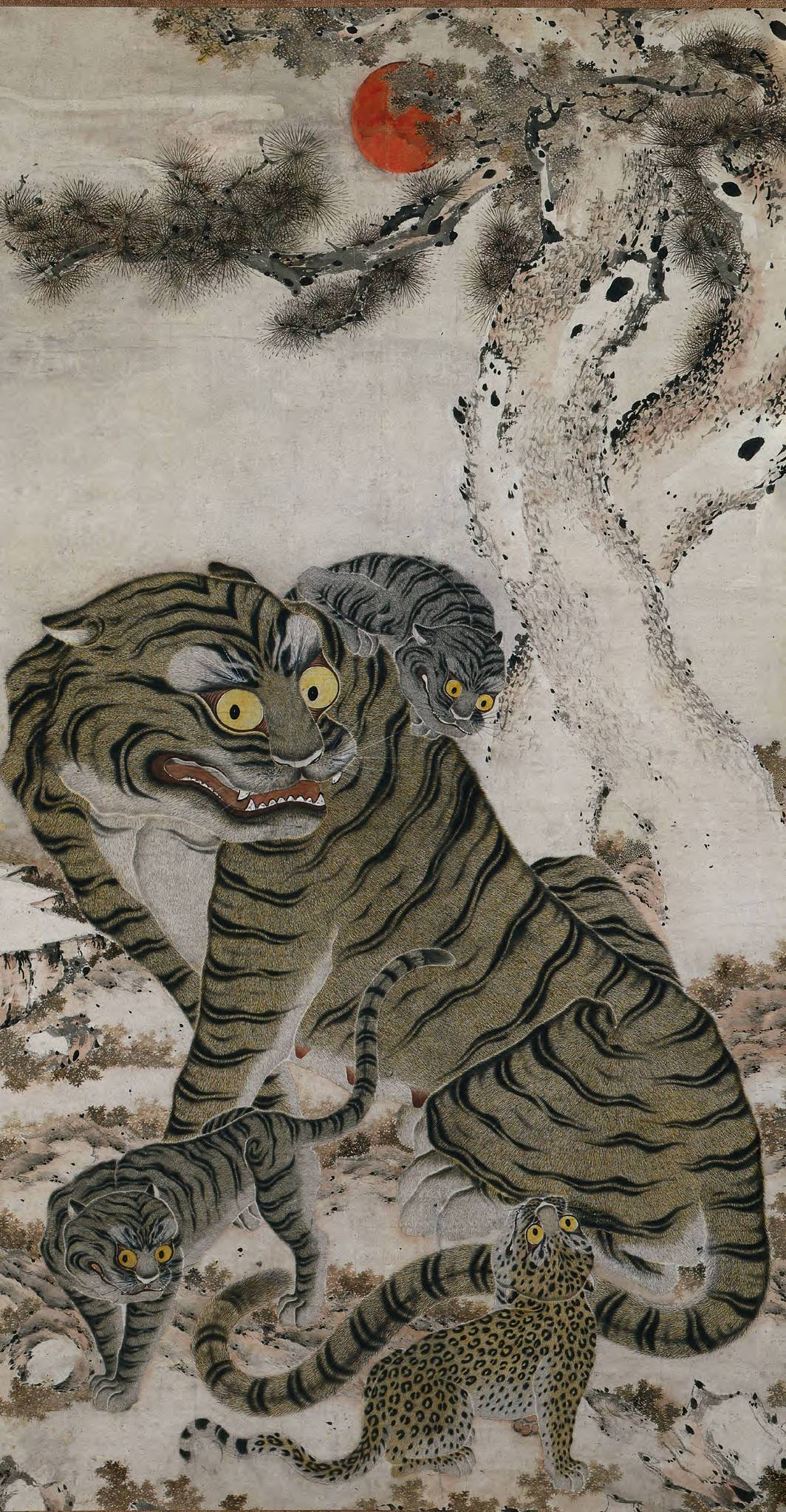
A tiger family depicted in a Korean scroll from the late 18th century

Six cases were recorded in 20th century Russia of unprovoked attacks leading to man-eating behaviour. Provoked attacks are, however, more common, usually the result of botched attempts at capturing them. In December 1997, an injured Amur tiger attacked, killed, and consumed two people. Both attacks occurred in the Bikin River valley. The anti-poaching task force Inspection Tiger investigated both deaths, tracked down and killed the tiger.

In January 2002, a man was attacked by a tiger on a remote mountain road near Hunchun in Jilin province, China, near the borders of Russia and North Korea. He suffered compound fractures but managed to survive. When he sought medical attention, his story raised suspicions as Siberian tigers seldom attack humans. An investigation of the attack scene revealed that the raw venison carried by the man was left untouched by the tiger. Officials suspected the man to be a poacher who provoked the attack. The following morning, tiger sightings were reported by locals along the same road, and a local TV station did an on-site coverage. The group found tiger tracks and blood spoor in the snow at the attack scene and followed them for approximately 2,500 meters, hoping to catch a glimpse of the animal. Soon, the tiger was seen ambling ahead of them. As the team tried to get closer for a better camera view, the tiger suddenly turned and charged, causing the four to flee in panic. About an hour after that encounter, the tiger attacked and killed a 26-year-old woman on the same road. Authorities retrieved the body with the help of a bulldozer. By then, the tiger was found lying 20 meters away, weak and barely alive. It was successfully tranquilized and taken for examination, which revealed that the tiger was anemic and gravely injured by a poacher's snare around its neck, with the steel wire cutting deeply down to the vertebrae, severing both trachea and esophagus. Despite extensive surgery by a team of veterinarians, the tiger died of wound infection. Subsequent investigation revealed that the first victim was a poacher who set multiple snares that caught both the tiger and a deer.

== In culture ==
Heraldic arms of the Jewish Autonomous Oblast in Russia

The English name 'Siberian tiger' was coined by James Cowles Prichard in the 1830s. The name 'Amur tiger' was used in 1933 for Siberian tigers killed by the Amur River for an exhibition in the American Museum of Natural History. The Siberian tiger was also called 'Manchurian tiger', 'Korean tiger', and 'Ussurian tiger', depending on the region where individuals were observed.

The Tungusic peoples considered the tiger a near-deity and often referred to it as "Grandfather" or "Old man". The Udege and Nanai people call it "Amba". The Manchu considered the Siberian tiger as Hu Lin, the king. Since the tiger has a mark on its foreheads that looks like a Chinese character for 'King' (Chinese: 王; pinyin: Wáng), or a similar character meaning "Great Emperor", it is revered by the Udege and Chinese people. The Siberian tiger is a national symbol of the Korean people due to its profound impact on traditional Korean culture.

People in Northeast China historically viewed the tiger as a major threat to humans and livestock. Taboos related to the tiger prior to the founding of the People's Republic of China included that loggers would avoid saying the word "tiger" (hu) while inside forests. In the early People's Republic of China, the tiger was a frequent diplomatic gift to other countries as zoo exhibit animals.

== See also ==
  - Mainland Asian tiger populations: Bengal tiger
  - Caspian tiger
  - Indochinese tiger
  - Malayan tiger
  - South China tiger
  - Sunda Island tiger populations: Javan tiger
  - Sumatran tiger
  - Bali tiger
  - Bornean tiger
  - Prehistoric tigers: Panthera tigris soloensis
  - Panthera tigris trinilensis
  - Panthera tigris acutidens
- Amur leopard
- Bergmann's rule
- Holocene extinction
