= Călinescu =

Călinescu is a Romanian surname. Notable people with the surname include:

- Armand Călinescu (1893–1939), Romanian economist, politician and assassinated Prime Minister
- Cristian Călinescu (born 1988), Romanian-British songwriter, musician and producer. Co-founder of Romantic Avenue
- Florin Călinescu (born 1956), Romanian politician, actor, theatre director, and television host
- George Călinescu (1899–1965), Romanian literary critic, writer and journalist
- Matei Călinescu (1934–2009), Romanian literary critic
- Max Calinescu (born 2003), Canadian actor, voice actor, and model of Romanian descent, known for his portrayal as Chase in Paw Patrol
- Paul Călinescu (1902–2000), Romanian film director
- Puiu Călinescu (1920–1997), (born Alexandru Călinescu) Romanian comedy actor

== See also ==
- Călin (given name)
- Călinești (disambiguation)
