= Călinești =

Călinești or Călineștii may refer to several places in Romania:

- Călinești, Argeș, a commune in Argeș County
- Călinești, Maramureș, a commune in Maramureș County
- Călinești, Teleorman, a commune in Teleorman County
- Călinești, a village in Negri Commune, Bacău County
- Călinești, a village in Cândești Commune, Botoșani County
- Călinești, a village in Mischii Commune, Dolj County
- Călinești, a village in Radomirești Commune, Olt County
- Călinești, a village in Florești Commune, Prahova County
- Călinești (formerly Călinești-Enache) and Călinești-Vasilache, two villages located within Dărmănești Commune, Suceava County
- Călinești, a village in Șerbăuți Commune, Suceava County
- Călinești, a district in Bucecea Town, Botoșani County
- Călinești, a district in Brezoi Town, Vâlcea County
- Călinești-Oaș, a commune in Satu Mare County
- Călineștii de Jos and Călineștii de Sus, villages in Bâlvănești Commune, Mehedinți County

rivers in Romania:

- Călinești, a tributary of the Bistrița in Suceava County
- Călinești (Olt), a tributary of the Olt in Vâlcea County

and to:

- Călinești, Fălești, a commune in Fălești district, Moldova

== See also ==
- Călin (given name)
- Călinescu (surname)
