= Călin Dan =

Romanian artist, theorist and curator

Călin Dan (born 1955 in Arad, Romania) is a Romanian artist, theorist and curator based in Amsterdam, Netherlands. Member of the subREAL artist duo together with Josif Kiraly. As a curator, Călin Dan has produced numerous exhibitions and was appointed director of the Soros Foundation's Center for Contemporary Art in Bucharest in 1992.
