= Călin Cristian Moldovan =

Romanian footballer

Cǎlin Moldovan
Personal information
- Full name: Călin Cristian Moldovan
- Date of birth: 10 July 1981 (age 45)
- Place of birth: Cluj-Napoca, Romania
- Height: 1.81 m (5 ft 11 1/2 in)
- Position: Goalkeeper

Youth career
- 1997–2000: Nicolae Dobrin Football Academy

Senior career*
Years	Team	Apps	(Gls)
2000–2002	Rapid București	?	(?)
2002	Tractorul Brașov	0	(0)
2003–2004	Universitatea Cluj	0	(0)
2004	Dunărea Turris Turnu Măgurele	0	(0)
2005	Rulmentul Alexandria	13	(0)
2005	IS Câmpia Turzii	3	(0)
2006	Liberty Salonta	15	(0)
2006	IS Câmpia Turzii	11	(0)
2007–2009	Universitatea Cluj	21	(0)
Total		63	(0)

Managerial career
- 2020: Victoria Cluj
- * Club domestic league appearances and goals as of 29 March 2020

Călin Cristian Moldovan (born 10 July 1981) is a Romanian former football goalkeeper.
