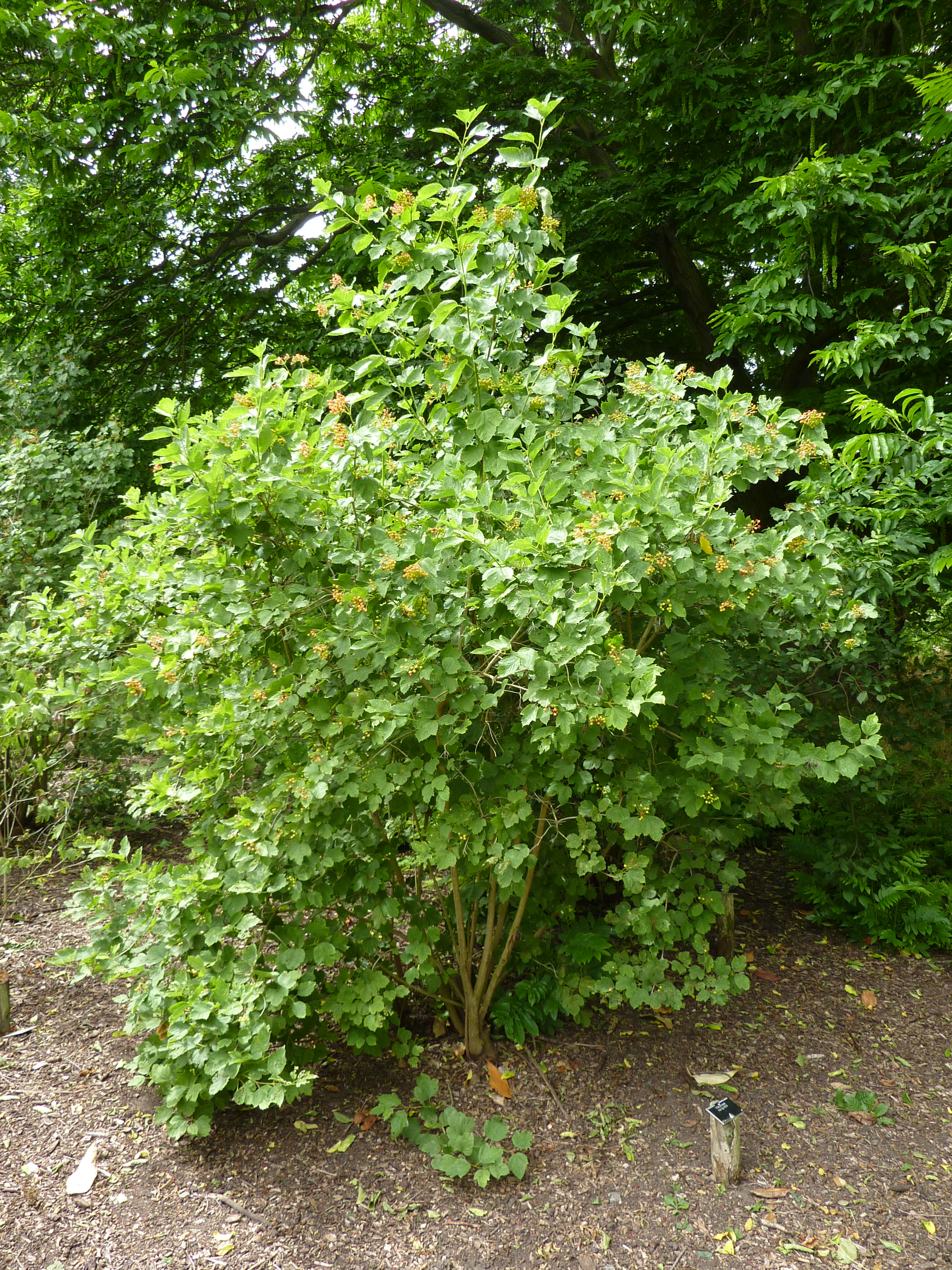
- Cambridge University Botanic Garden

Scientific classification
- Kingdom: Plantae
- Clade: Embryophytes
- Clade: Tracheophytes
- Clade: Spermatophytes
- Clade: Angiosperms
- Clade: Eudicots
- Clade: Asterids
- Order: Dipsacales
- Family: Viburnaceae
- Genus: Viburnum
- Species: V. sargentii

Binomial name
- Viburnum sargentii Koehne

= Viburnum sargentii =

Species of flowering plant

Viburnum sargentii is a species of flowering plant in the family Viburnaceae (formerly Caprifoliaceae), native to north eastern Asia. Growing to 3 m (10 ft) tall and broad, it is a substantial deciduous shrub with 3-lobed, maple-like leaves, often turning red in autumn. Flat white flower-heads (cymes) resembling those of lacecap hydrangeas are borne in early summer. The outer florets are saucer-shaped and sterile, while the central tubular flowers are fertile. The flowers are followed in autumn by globose red berries.

The specific epithet sargentii commemorates the American botanist Charles Sprague Sargent.

The cultivar 'Onondaga', with red central flowers, has gained the Royal Horticultural Society's Award of Garden Merit.
