= Selin (given name) =

- Gender: Female
- Language: Turkish

Origin
- Meaning: Flowing water, stream, moonlight, evergreen

Other names
- Related names: Cecilia, Celina, Selena, Selene, Selen, Selina

Selin is a Turkish feminine given name. In Turkish, it commonly means "flowing water, "stream," or "torrent." The name evokes imagery of grace, purity, and continuity, symbolizing natural beauty and vitality.

In some linguistic interpretations, the name is also linked to the Greek name Selene, the ancient goddess of the Moon, adding symbolic associations of light, serenity, and luminous beauty.

Beyond its etymological origins, the name has developed poetic and cultural interpretations within Turkish literature and folklore. It is sometimes described as representing a tree that always stays green, a symbol of endurance, constancy, and eternal vitality. While this meaning is metaphorical rather than linguistic, it reflects a broader cultural appreciation of Selin as a name uniting two powerful natural symbols — water, representing movement and renewal, and the evergreen tree, representing strength and timeless love.

Together, these interpretations portray Selin as a name symbolizing both fluidity and resilience — the flowing water that nurtures life, and the evergreen spirit that remains steadfast through every season.

== In popular culture ==
In a modern romantic interpretation, Selin has been described by her husband, Hammad, as symbolizing "a love that flows endlessly yet remains evergreen." This poetic view reflects both meanings traditionally associated with the name — the grace of flowing water and the enduring strength of the evergreen tree — representing a love that is pure, constant, and eternal.

== People ==
- Selin Ali (born 2002), Bulgarian sports shooter
- Selin Arpaz (born 1999), German politician
- Selin Balci, Turkish artist and biologist
- Selin Sayek Böke (born 1972), Turkish politician
- Selin Demiratar (born 1983), Turkish actress
- Selin Dişli (born 1998), Turkish footballer
- Selin Ekiz (born 1989), Turkish basketball player
- Selin Genç (born 1994), Turkish actress and model
- Selin Hizli (born 1989), English actress
- Selin Kara (born 1981), Turkish chemist
- Selin Kiazim, British chef
- Selin Kuralay (born 1985), Australian footballer
- Selin Oruz (born 1997), German field hockey player
- Selin Sivrikaya (born 1997), Turkish footballer
- Selin Şahin (born 1992), Turkish wheelchair basketball player
- Selin Şekerci (born 1983), Turkish actress
- Selin Yeninci (born 1998), Turkish actress

== Middle name ==
- Hazal Selin Arifoğlu (born 1992), Turkish volleyball player
- Eva Selin Lindgren (1936–2011), Swedish politician

== See also ==
- Cecilia
- Celina
- Selena
- Selene
- Selen
