= Selin =

Selin may refer to:

== Places ==
- Selin, Iran, a village

== Given name ==
- Selin (given name), Turkish given name.

== Surname ==
- Aleksei Selin (born 1978), Russian football player
- Ari-Pekka Selin (born 1963), Finnish ice hockey player and coach
- Christian Selin (born 1976), Finnish racing cyclist
- Erik Selin (born 1967), Swedish businessman
- Erika Selin (born 1991), Swedish singer
- Eva Selin Lindgren (1936–2011), Swedish politician and physicist
- Fyodor Selin (1899–1960), Soviet football player and coach
- Helaine Selin (born 1946), American librarian and author
- Ivan Selin (born 1937), American businessman
- Maria Selin (born 1977), Finnish ice hockey player
- Markus Selin (born 1960), Finnish television and film producer
- Markus Selin (born 1978), Swedish politician
- Patrik Selin, Swedish businessman
- Sebastian Selin (born 1992), Swedish ice hockey player
- Victor Șelin (born 1965), Moldovan businessman and politician
- Yevhen Selin (born 1988), Ukrainian footballer

== See also ==
- Celin
- Selina
- Seline (disambiguation)
- Sellin (disambiguation)
- Selen (disambiguation)
- Silen (disambiguation)
