= 1648 in science =

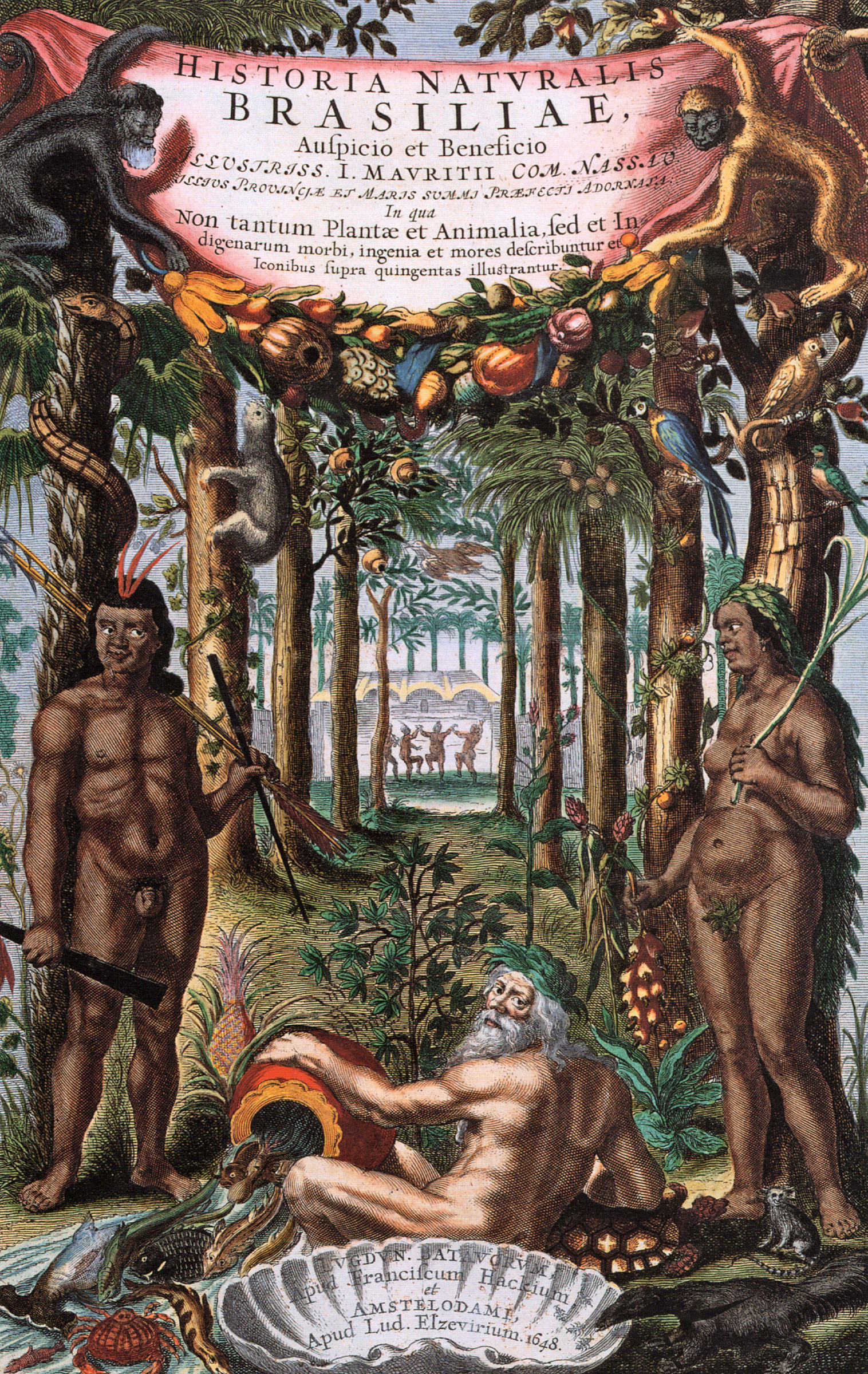

The year 1648 in science and technology involved some significant events.

== Astronomy ==
- Johannes Hevelius discovers the longitudinal libration of the Moon.

== Exploration ==
- June–September – Semyon Dezhnyov makes the first recorded voyage through the Bering Strait.

== Natural history ==
- Willem Piso and Georg Marcgrave's Historia Naturalis Brasiliae is published in the Netherlands.

== Physics ==
- September 19 – Blaise Pascal's brother-in-law, Florin Périer, demonstrates in an ascent of the Puy-de-Dôme that atmospheric pressure varies with height.

== Technology ==
- Clear script, used by the Torgut Mongols of Sinkiang, is developed by Zaya Pandita.

== Publications ==
- Jan Baptist van Helmont's collected works, Ortus medicinae, vel opera et opuscula omnia, are published posthumously by Lodewijk Elzevir in Amsterdam, edited and Latinized by his son Franciscus Mercurius van Helmont. Transitional between alchemy and chemistry, they contain the results of numerous experiments and establish an early version of the law of conservation of mass.

== Births ==
- December 15 – Gregory King, English statistician (died 1712)

== Deaths ==
- September 1 – Marin Mersenne, French mathematician (born 1588)
- November 3 – John Bainbridge, English astronomer (born 1582)
