= Notes on the State of Virginia =

Book by Thomas Jefferson

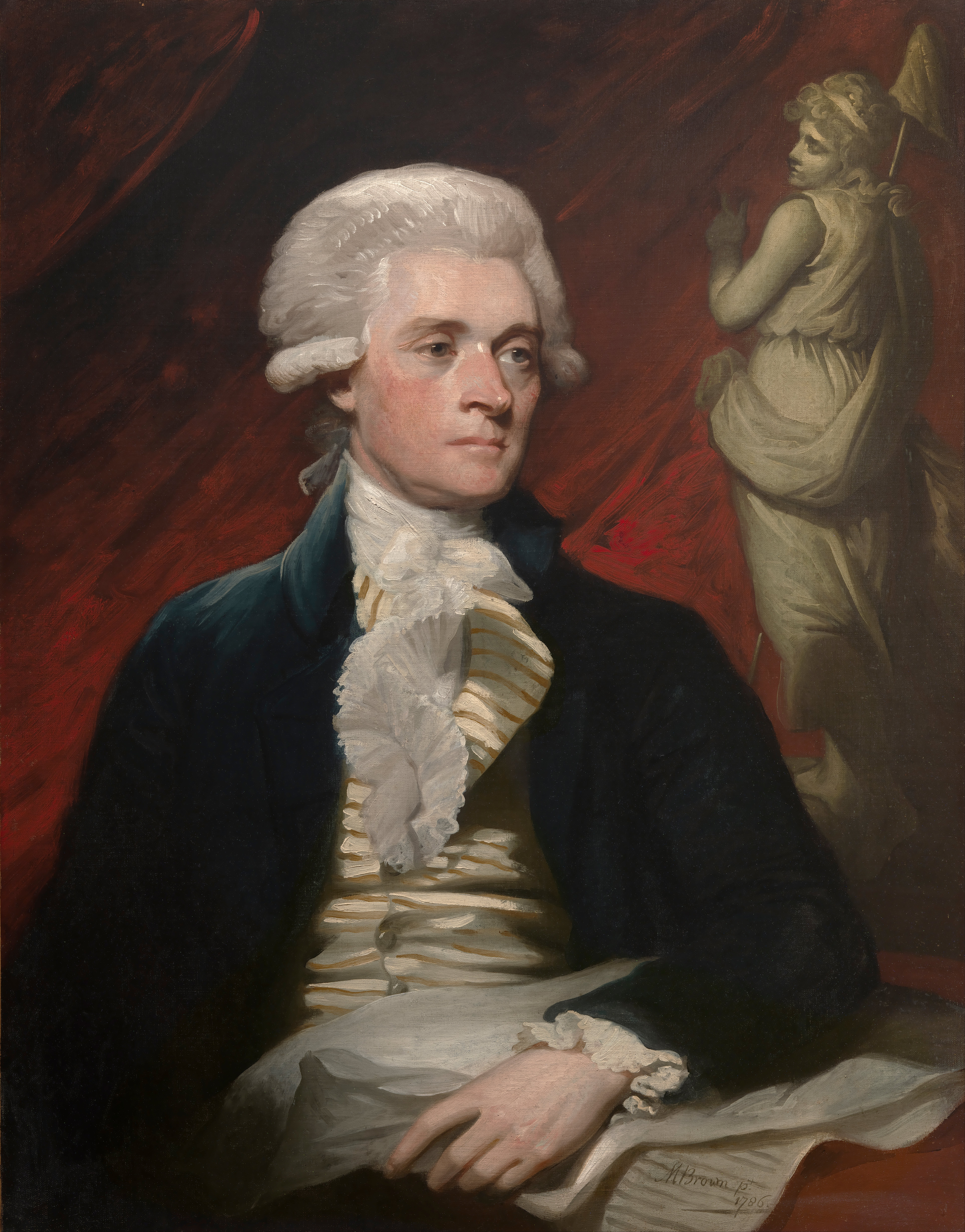
1786 portrait of Jefferson by Mather Brown

Notes on the State of Virginia is a 1785 book written by the American statesman, philosopher, and planter Thomas Jefferson. It is the only full-length book Jefferson published during his lifetime. He completed the first version in 1781 and updated and enlarged the book in 1782 and 1783. It originated in Jefferson's responses to questions about Virginia, part of a series of questions posed to each of the thirteen states in 1780 by François Barbé-Marbois, the secretary of the French delegation in Philadelphia, the temporary capital of the Continental Congress.

Notes on the State of Virginia is both a compilation of data by Jefferson about the state's natural resources and economy and his vigorous argument about the nature of the good society, which he believed to be incarnated by Virginia. He expressed his beliefs in republicanism, the separation of church and state, constitutional reform, checks and balances, and individual liberty. Conversely, Jefferson also wrote extensively about slavery and the virtues he perceived the practice to bear, his dislike of miscegenation, justifications for white supremacy, and his belief that White and Black Americans could not co-exist in a society in which Blacks were free.

Jefferson first had the book published anonymously in Paris by Philippe Denis Pierres in 1785 while Jefferson was serving the U.S. government as a trade representative. A French translation by Abbé Morellet appeared in 1787. In London, John Stockdale published it in 1787 after Jefferson had come to terms for a limited print run and other arrangements.

== Publication ==
Notes was anonymously published in Paris in 1785 as a limited private edition of 200 copies. A French translation by Abbé Morellet appeared in 1787 (though with an imprint date of 1786). Its first public edition, issued by John Stockdale in London, began to be sold in 1787. It was the only full-length book by Jefferson that was published during his lifetime though he issued a Manual of Parliamentary Practice for the Use of the Senate of the United States, generally known as Jefferson's Manual, in 1801.

Notes includes some of Jefferson's most memorable statements of belief in political, legal, and constitutional principles like the separation of church and state, constitutional government, checks and balances, and individual liberty.

== Naturalism ==
Jefferson meticulously documented, to his abilities, the natural resources of Virginia and fiercely opposed the proposition of the French naturalist Georges Louis Leclerc, Comte de Buffon, whose authoritative Histoire Naturelle stated that nature, plant life, animal life, and human life degenerate in the New World in contrast with their state in the Old World.

Jefferson noted the 1648 work of scientists Georg Marcgraf and Willem Piso, whose work on natural history in Dutch Brazil resulted in the Historia Naturalis Brasiliae and argued that the honeybee was not native to North America.

== Outline ==
The text is divided into 23 chapters, which Jefferson termed "Queries," each describing a different aspect of Virginia.

1. Boundaries of Virginia
2. Rivers
3. Sea Ports
4. Mountains
5. Cascades
6. Productions mineral, vegetable and animal
7. Climate
8. Population
9. Military force
10. Marine force
11. Aborigines
12. Counties and towns
13. Constitution
14. Laws
15. Colleges, buildings, and roads
16. Proceedings as to Tories
17. Religion
18. Manners
19. Manufactures
20. Subjects of commerce
21. Weights, Measures and Money
22. Public revenue and expenses
23. Histories, memorials, and state-papers

== Freedom of speech and secular government ==
Notes on the State of Virginia contained Jefferson's firm belief in citizens' rights to express themselves freely without fear of government or church reprisal and that government's role is only secular and should not have anything to do with religion. That led later to charges of atheism leveled at him by his opponents in Federalist newspapers before the nasty election of 1800.

Jefferson addressed the authority of government and laws:

The legitimate powers of government extend to such acts only as are injurious to others. But it does me no injury for my neighbor to say there are twenty gods, or no god. It neither picks my pocket nor breaks my leg.

However, in Query XVIII, he also addressed the presumed retribution for lack of theistic respect:

Can the liberties of a nation be thought secure when we have removed their only firm basis, a conviction in the minds of the people that these liberties are the gift of God? That they are not to be violated but with his wrath? Indeed I tremble for my country when I reflect that God is just: that his justice cannot sleep forever....

The biographer Joseph J. Ellis noted that Jefferson thought that the work would be unknown in the United States since he did not publish it in North America and kept his authorship anonymous in Europe. He exchanged letters with friends and was worried what they would think about his authorship of such a religious heresy. They supported him in response. Jefferson did not respond at all to the mud-slinging charges.

He won the presidential election anyway, but the charges of atheism and the charges of an affair with a 15-year-old slave, Sally Hemings, published in newspapers by Federalists supporters put his belief in a free press and free speech to the test.

His predecessor, John Adams, had angrily counterattacked the press and his vocal opponents by passing chilling Alien and Sedition Acts. Jefferson, in contrast, worked tirelessly to overturn what he viewed as tyrannical limits on free speech and free press except for when he asked Thomas McKean, the governor of Pennsylvania, to have Federalist newspapermen indicted for libel by claiming that it was necessary to prevent licentious abuses of free speech.

Jefferson later lamented the anguish caused by his political enemies but never denied their charges, including those in Notes on Virginia, and he never gave up his fight for "Republican principles" to shield the common man from state or religious oppression.

== Slavery ==
In "Laws" (Query XIV-14), Jefferson redirected questions about slavery by focusing the discussion toward Africans by referring to what he called "the real distinctions which nature has made" between people of European descent and people of African descent. He later expressed his opposition to slavery in "Manners" (Query XVIII-18).

Jefferson's proposal for resettling freed blacks in a colony in Africa expressed the mentality and anxieties of some American slaveholders after the American Revolutionary War, which contrasted with the rising sentiment among some other American slave owners to emancipate their slaves because of the hypocrisy in fighting for independence while they held thousands of blacks in bondage. Numerous northern states abolished slavery altogether. Several southern states, including Virginia in 1782, made manumissions easier.

So many slaveholders in Virginia freed slaves between the 1780s and the 1800s, sometimes in their will and others during their lifetime, that the number of free blacks in Virginia rose from about 1,800 in 1782 to 30,466, or 7.2% of the total black population in 1810. In the Upper South, more than 10% of blacks had been free by 1810.

However, millions of slaves still remained in bondage in the South, and freedmen faced high levels of racism in the North. The South would keep slavery until after the American Civil War and the Emancipation Proclamation.

In "Laws", Jefferson wrote:

It will probably be asked, Why not retain and incorporate the blacks into the state, and thus save the expense of supplying, by importation of white settlers, the vacancies they will leave? Deep rooted prejudices entertained by the whites; ten thousand recollections, by the blacks, of the injuries they have sustained; new provocations; the real distinctions which nature has made; and many other circumstances, will divide us into parties, and produce convulsions which will probably never end but in the extermination of the one or the other race.

Some slaveowners feared race wars could ensue upon emancipation least because of natural retaliation by blacks for the injustices under their long period of slavery. Jefferson may have thought his fears to be justified after the Haitian Revolution, which was marked by widespread violence in the mass uprising of slaves against white colonists and free people of color in their fight for independence. Thousands of white and free people of color came as refugees to the United States in the early 1800s, many of whom brought their slaves. In addition, uprisings such as that of Gabriel in Richmond, Virginia, were often led by literate blacks.

Jefferson and some other slaveholders embraced the idea of "colonization" by arranging for transportation of free blacks to Africa, including those born in the United States. In 1816, the American Colonization Society was founded in a collaboration by abolitionists and slaveholders.

Jefferson also stated his belief that blacks were inferior to whites in terms of beauty, intelligence, artistry, imagination, and odor:

The improvement of the blacks in body and mind, in the first instance of their mixture with the whites, has been observed by every one, and proves that their inferiority is not the effect merely of their condition of life.

In "Manners", Jefferson wrote that slavery was demoralizing to both whites and blacks and that man is an "imitative animal".

Jefferson included a warning about the potential for slave rebellions if slavery was not abolished, writing "Indeed I tremble for my country when I reflect that God is just: that his justice cannot sleep for ever: that considering numbers, nature and natural means only, a revolution of the wheel of fortune, an exchange of situation is among possible events: that it may become probable by supernatural interference! The almighty has no attribute which can take side with us in such a contest." He concluded the chapter stating that he hoped social conditions in America were turning in favor of "total emancipation", though he hoped this would occur by "the consent of the masters, rather than by their extirpation."

== Navy ==
Jefferson included discussion on America's potential naval capacity because of its extensive natural resources. The section would be used by the Federalist William Loughton Smith to embarrass Republican anti-navalists during debate in 1796 over whether to continue the construction of the original six frigates of the United States Navy. Smith claimed that others believed that commerce required a navy to protect it, and he read a lengthy extract from Jefferson's Notes to prove that the country could support a much larger navy than the Federalists wanted to build. That occasioned Republican accusations that Smith had taken Jefferson out of context or claims that Jefferson was mistaken in his understanding.

== Climate ==
Jefferson's observations on the climate of Virginia in Chapter 7 noted the recent climate change, which included warming:

A change in our climate however is taking place very sensibly. Both heats and colds are become much more moderate within the memory even of the middle-aged. Snows are less frequent and less deep. They do not often lie, below the mountains, more than one, two, or three days, and very rarely a week. They are remembered to have been formerly frequent, deep, and of long continuance. The elderly inform me the earth used to be covered with snow about three months in every year. The rivers, which then seldom failed to freeze over in the course of the winter, scarcely ever do so now. This change has produced an unfortunate fluctuation between heat and cold, in the spring of the year, which is very fatal to fruits. From the year 1741 to 1769, an interval of twenty-eight years, there was no instance of fruit killed by the frost in the neighbourhood of Monticello. An intense cold, produced by constant snows, kept the buds locked up till the sun could obtain, in the spring of the year, so fixed an ascendency as to dissolve those snows, and protect the buds, during their development, from every danger of returning cold. The accumulated snows of the winter remaining to be dissolved all together in the spring, produced those overflowings of our rivers, so frequent then, and so rare now.

== Influence ==
Jefferson's work inspired others by his reflections on the nature of society, human rights, and government. Supporters of abolition in the United States considered his thoughts on blacks and slavery to be obstacles to achieving equal rights for free blacks in the United States. People argued against Jefferson's ideas long after he died. For instance, the abolitionist David Walker, a free black, opposed the colonization movement. In Article IV of his Appeal (1830), Walker stated that free blacks considered colonization to be the desire of whites to remove free blacks:

from among those of our brethren whom they unjustly hold in bondage, so that they may be enabled to keep them the more secure in ignorance and wretchedness, to support them and their children, and consequently they would have the more obedient slave. For if the free are allowed to stay among the slave, they will have intercourse together, and, of course, the free will learn the slaves bad habits, by teaching them that they are MEN, as well as other people, and certainly ought and must be FREE.

Jefferson's passages about slavery and blacks in Notes were referred to and disputed by Walker in the Appeal. Walker valued Jefferson as "one of as great characters as ever lived among the whites" but opposed Jefferson's ideas:

Do you believe that the assertions of such a man, will pass away into oblivion unobserved by this people and the world?... I say, that unless we try to refute Mr. Jefferson's arguments respecting us, we will only establish them.

He went on to state:

Mr. Jefferson's very severe remarks on us have been so extensively argued upon by men whose attainments in literature, I shall never be able to reach, that I would not have meddled with it, were it not to solicit each of my brethren, who has the spirit of a man, to buy a copy of Mr. Jefferson's Notes on Virginia, and put it in the hand of his son. For let no one of us suppose that the refutations which have been written by our white friends are enough—they are whites—we are blacks. We, and the world wish to see the charges of Mr. Jefferson refuted by the blacks themselves, according to their chance; for we must remember that what the whites have written respecting this subject, is other men's labours, and did not emanate from the blacks.

== Sources ==
- R. B. Bernstein, Thomas Jefferson (New York: Oxford University Press, 2003; pbk, 2005) ISBN 978-0-19-518130-2
- —— (2004). The Revolution of Ideas. Oxford University Press, 251 pages. ISBN 9780195143683., Book
- Robert A. Ferguson, Law and Letters in American Culture (Cambridge, Mass.: Harvard University Press, 1984) ISBN 978-0-674-51466-9
- Dustin Gish and Daniel Klinghard. Thomas Jefferson and the Science of Republican Government: A Political Biography of Notes on the State of Virginia (Cambridge UP, 2017). x, 341 pp.
- Peter Kolchin, American Slavery, 1619-1877, New York: Hill and Wang, 1993; pbk, 1994
- The Life and Selected Writings of Thomas Jefferson. The Modern Library, 1944.
- Thomas Jefferson: Writings: Autobiography / Notes on the State of Virginia / Public and Private Papers / Addresses / Letters (1984, ISBN 978-0-940450-16-5) Library of America edition.
- David Tucker, Enlightened Republicanism: A Study of Jefferson's Notes on the State of Virginia (Lexington Books, 2008) ISBN 978-0-7391-1792-7
- David Walker, Appeal, 1830, electronic text, Documents of the American South, University of North Carolina
