= Historia Naturalis =

Historia Naturalis may refer to:

- Natural History (Pliny), a natural history encyclopedia by Pliny the Elder
- Historia Naturalis Brasiliae, a book on Brazilian natural history by Willem Piso and Georg Marcgraf published in 1648
- Historia naturalis palmarum, a botanical book by Carl Friedrich Philipp von Martius published between 1823 and 1850
