= Silen =

Silen may refer to:

- Silen, Bulgaria, a village in Bulgaria
- Silen language, a language of Indonesia
- Johan Silén, Finnish sailor
- William Silen, Puerto Rican athlete

== See also ==
- Silenus, in Greek mythology
- Silene (disambiguation)
- Sillen
- Selene (disambiguation)
- Seline (disambiguation)
- Cilen
