= Salena =

Salena may refer to:

- Salena, Nepal, village development committee
- Salena Jones (born 1938), American jazz and cabaret singer
- Salena Godden, British poet, performer and author
- Salena, an Austrian singer

== See also ==
- Selena (disambiguation)
