= Selen (name) =

- Gender: Female
- Language: Turkish

Origin
- Meaning: "The sound of flowing water" or "a peaceful flow"

Other names
- Related names: Cecilia, Celina, Selena, Selene, Selin

Selen is a feminine Turkish given name and a surname. It means "the sound of flowing water" or "a peaceful flow" in Turkish.

== Given name ==
- Selen Akalın (born 1998), Turkish female handball player
- Selen Altunkulak (born 1997), Turkish-French women's footballer
- Selen Öndeş (born 1988), Turkish female volleyball player
- Selen Özbilen (born 2001), Turkish swimmer
- Selen Öztürk (born 1980), Turkish actress
- Selen Soyder (born 1986), Turkish actress
- Selen Tınaz (born 2008), Turkish motorcycle racer
- Selen Uçer (born 1973), Turkish actress

== Surname ==
- Bert Selen (born 1985), Dutch music producer
- İsmail Selen (1931–1991), Turkish general
- Sinan Selen (born 1972), German constitutional lawyer
- Suna Selen (born 1939), Turkish actress
