= Selina =

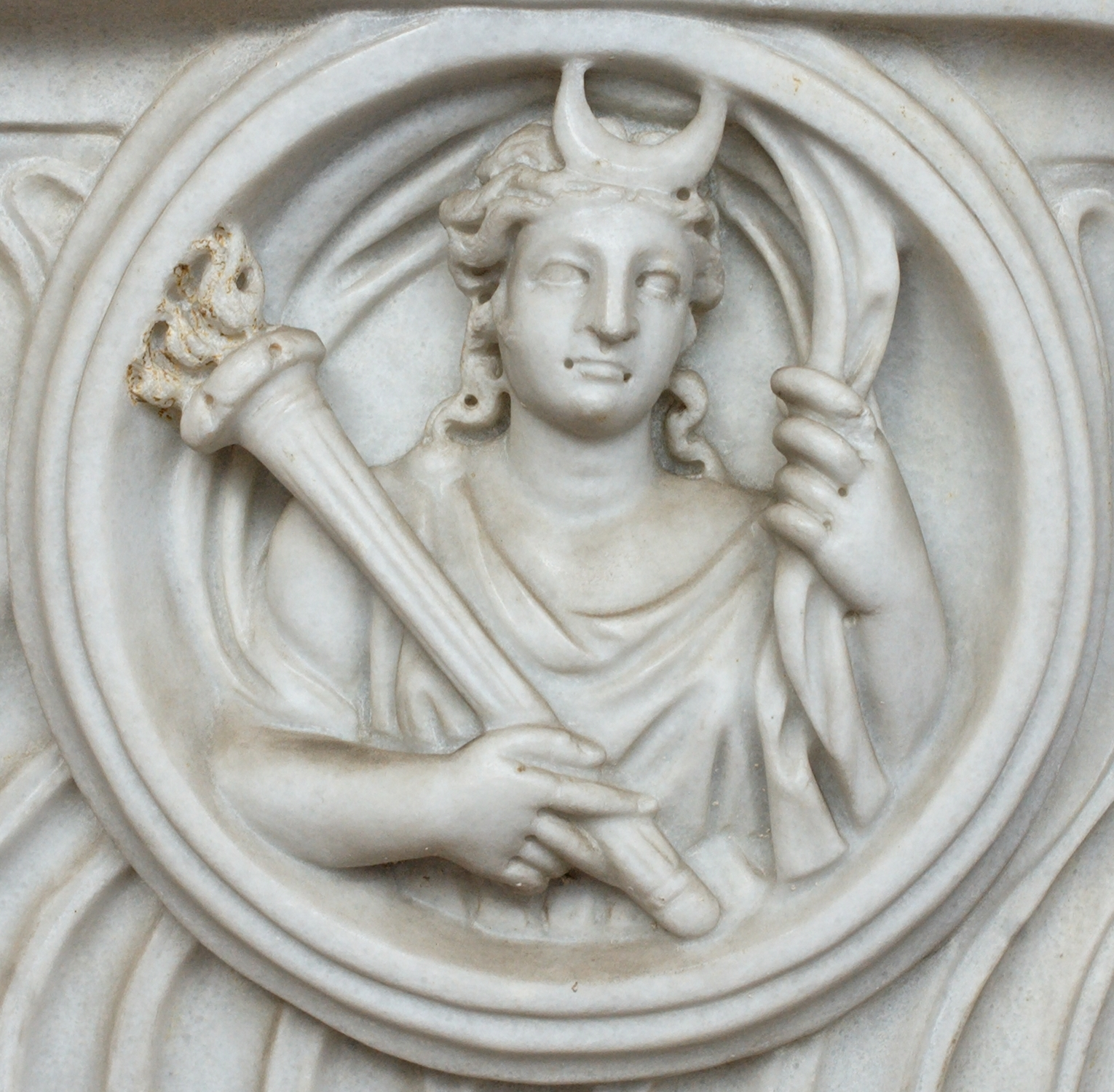
- An Ancient Roman bust of the goddess Selene, the personification of the Moon.
- Pronunciation: /səˈliːnə/
- Gender: female

Origin
- Languages: Greek, Latin
- Meaning: “Moon” or “woman from the Caecilia gens”

Other names
- Related names: Cecilia, Celina, Salina, Selena, Selene, Selin

Selina (/səˈliːnə/) is a feminine given name, considered either a variant of Selene, the goddess and personification of the Moon in Greek mythology and religion, or a spelling variation of the name Celina, which is derived from the Roman name Cecilia, referring to a woman from the Caecilia gens. This spelling variant had begun to be used in the United Kingdom by the 1600s.

== People ==
- Selina Barrios (born 1993), American former professional boxer
- Selina Brown, British author and founder of the Black British Book Festival
- Selina Büchel (born 1991), Swiss middle-distance runner
- Selina Chow (born 1945), Hong Kong politician and broadcaster
- Selina Cooper (1864–1946), English suffragist
- Selina Cossgrove (1849–1929), one of the early developers of the Girl Peace Scouts movement in New Zealand
- Selina Egle (born 2003), Austrian luger
- Selina Fillinger (born 1994), American playwright, TV writer, and screenwriter
- Selina Foote (born 1985), New Zealand artist
- Selina Gasparin (born 1984), Swiss biathlete
- Selina Griffiths (born 1969), British actress
- Selina Hastings, Countess of Huntingdon (1707–1791), English Christian revivalist, Methodist
- Selina Hastings (Lady Selina Shirley Hastings, born 1945), British biographer and journalist
- Selina Hornibrook (born 1978), Australian netball player
- Selina Hossain (born 1947), Bangladeshi novelist
- Selina Jen (born 1981), Taiwanese girl-band member
- Selina Jenkinson (1812–1883), British aristocrat
- Selina Johnson (born 1951), American golf instructor and youth advocate
- Selina Jörg (born 1988), German snowboarder
- Selina Kuruleca, Fijian psychotherapist and commentator
- Selina Leem, Marshallese climate change activist and spoken word performer
- Selina Özuzun Doğan (born 1988), Turkish politician
- Selina Peratrovich (1889/1890 – 1984), Haida weaver
- Selina Perera (1909–1986), Sri Lankan Sinhala Trotskyist
- Selina Robinson (born c. 1964), Canadian politician from British Columbia
- Selina Scott (born 1951), English newsreader, journalist, television producer and presenter
- Selina Siggins (1878–1964), Australian trade unionist and politician
- Selina Tusitala Marsh (born 1971), Pasifika poet-scholar
- Selina Wadge (1850–1878), English executed criminal
- Selina Wang (born 1993), American journalist
- Selina Zhumatayeva (born 1998), Kazakhstani rhythmic gymnast

== Variants ==
- A Spanish version of the name is Selena.
- A Greek version of the name is Σελένα.
- A French version of the name is Sélène.
- A Hebrew version of the name is סלינה.
- A Turkish version of the name is Selin.

== Fictional characters ==
- Selina Peake De Jong, the protagonist of Edna Ferber's novel So Big
- Selina Kyle (disambiguation), alter ego of the original Catwoman, the DC Comics character
- Selina Meyer, protagonist of the HBO television comedy series Veep
- Selina Roberts, from the Australian soap opera Home and Away
- Selina, the secondary antagonist in the sixth season of Winx Club
- Selina Khan, main character from CBBC's Wolfblood
- Selina D'Arcey, main character from 1965 American film A Patch of Blue
- Selina Plymdale, a character in Middlemarch - a novel by English author George Eliot

== Other ==
- Selina, a novel by German author Jean Paul, published posthumously in 1827
- Selina (1948), a ballet for Sadler's Wells, choreographed by Andrée Howard to music by Rossini.

== See also ==
- Celina (disambiguation)
- Céline (disambiguation)
- Selene (disambiguation)
- Selenia (moth), a genus of moths
- Selena (disambiguation)
- Tselina (disambiguation)
- Selin (disambiguation)
