= List of Billboard Latin Pop Albums number ones from the 2020s =

Latin Pop Albums is a record chart published in Billboard magazine that features Latin music sales information regarding Latin pop music. The data is compiled by Nielsen SoundScan from a sample that includes music stores, music departments at electronics and department stores, Internet sales (both physical and digital) and verifiable sales from concert venues in the United States.

== Number-one albums ==
Artist	Album	Reached number one	Weeks at number one
Los Lobos	Llego Navidad	4 January 2020	1
Luis Fonsi	Vida	11 January 2020	5
Shakira	Sale el Sol	15 February 2020	2
Luis Fonsi	Vida	29 February 2020	4
Selena	Ones	28 March 2020	5
Camilo	Por Primera Vez	2 May 2020	2
Selena	Ones	16 May 2020	8
Luis Fonsi	Vida	11 July 2020	1
Selena	Ones	18 July 2020	7
The Mavericks	En Espanol	5 September 2020	1
Selena	Ones	12 September 2020	25
Kali Uchis	Sin Miedo (del Amor y Otros Demonios)	6 March 2021	3
Selena Gomez	Revelación	27 March 2021	1
Kali Uchis	Sin Miedo (del Amor y Otros Demonios)	3 April 2021	6
Selena	Ones	15 May 2021	22
Kali Uchis	Sin Miedo (del Amor y Otros Demonios)	16 October 2021	1
Selena	Ones	23 October 2021	23
Rosalía	Motomami	2 April 2022	4
Selena	Ones	30 April 2022	1
Rosalía	Motomami	7 May 2022	1
Selena	Ones	14 May 2022	2
Becky G	Esquemas	28 May 2022	5
Kali Uchis	Sin Miedo (del Amor y Otros Demonios)	2 July 2022	1
Becky G	Esquemas	9 July 2022	3
Rosalía	Motomami	30 July 2022	1
Selena	Ones	6 August 2022	5
Selena	Moonchild Mixes	10 September 2022	1
Selena	Ones	17 September 2022	1
Rosalía	Motomami	24 September 2022	12
Selena	Ones	24 December 2022	1
Rosalía	Motomami	31 December 2022	6
Selena	Ones	11 February 2023	50
Kali Uchis	Orquídeas	27 January 2024	10
Shakira	Las Mujeres Ya No Lloran	6 April 2024	13
Selena	Ones	6 July 2024	2
Shakira	Las Mujeres Ya No Lloran	20 July 2024	5
Kali Uchis	Orquídeas	24 August 2024	4
Shakira	Las Mujeres Ya No Lloran	21 September 2024	3
Marco Antonio Solís	40 Anos Mas	12 October 2024	1
Shakira	Las Mujeres Ya No Lloran	19 October 2024	1
Marco Antonio Solís	40 Anos Mas	26 October 2024	1
Shakira	Las Mujeres Ya No Lloran	2 November 2024	3
Los Bukis	La Mas Completa Coleccion	23 November 2025	1
Marco Antonio Solís	40 Anos Mas	30 November 2024	2
Kali Uchis	Orquídeas	14 December 2024	1
Marco Antonio Solís	40 Anos Mas	21 December 2024	3
Enrique Iglesias	Greatest Hits (2019)	11 January 2025	1
Marco Antonio Solís	40 Anos Mas	18 January 2025	2
Los Bukis	La Mas Completa Coleccion	1 February 2025	1
Selena	Ones	8 February 2025	25
Kapo	Por Si Alguien Nos Escucha	19 July 2025	1
Selena	Ones	26 July 2025	5
Selena	Dreaming of You	30 August 2025	2
Enrique Iglesias	Greatest Hits (2019)	13 September 2025	1
Maná	Exiliados en la Bahía: Lo Mejor de Maná	20 September 2025	1
Kapo	Por Si Alguien Nos Escucha	27 September 2025	1
Los Bukis	La Mas Completa Coleccion	4 October 2025	2
Selena	Dreaming of You	18 October 2025	1
Los Bukis	La Mas Completa Coleccion	25 October 2025	1
Selena	Dreaming of You	1 November 2025	1
Marco Antonio Solís	Con Amor y Sentimiento	8 November 2025	1
Juan Gabriel	Mis Número 1...40 Aniversario	15 November 2025	1
Rosalía	Lux	22 November 2025	21
Kali Uchis	Sin Miedo (del Amor y Otros Demonios)	18 April 2026	1
Rosalía	Lux	25 April 2026	6
Selena	Ones	6 June 2026	10
Fred Again and Latin Mafia	9 Months and 50 Hours	15 August 2026	1
Karol G	No Me Arrepiento de Sentir Tanto	22 August 2026	14
