= Selling (disambiguation) =

Selling is the profession of making sales.

Selling may also refer to:

== People ==
- Ben Selling (1853–1931), U.S. businessman and politician
- Caj Selling (1935–2005), Swedish-born dancer who danced in The Australian Ballet's first performance in 1962
- Eduard Selling (1834–1920), German mathematician
- Margarete Selling, German rower

== Places ==
- Selling, Denmark, a town in Favrskov Municipality, Denmark
- Selling, Kent, a village in England

== Other uses ==
- Selling (professional wrestling)

== See also ==
- Sell (disambiguation)
- Sale (disambiguation)
- Seling
- Sellin (disambiguation)
- Trade
