= Joannes de Laet =

Dutch geographer (1581–1649)

Johannes de Laet
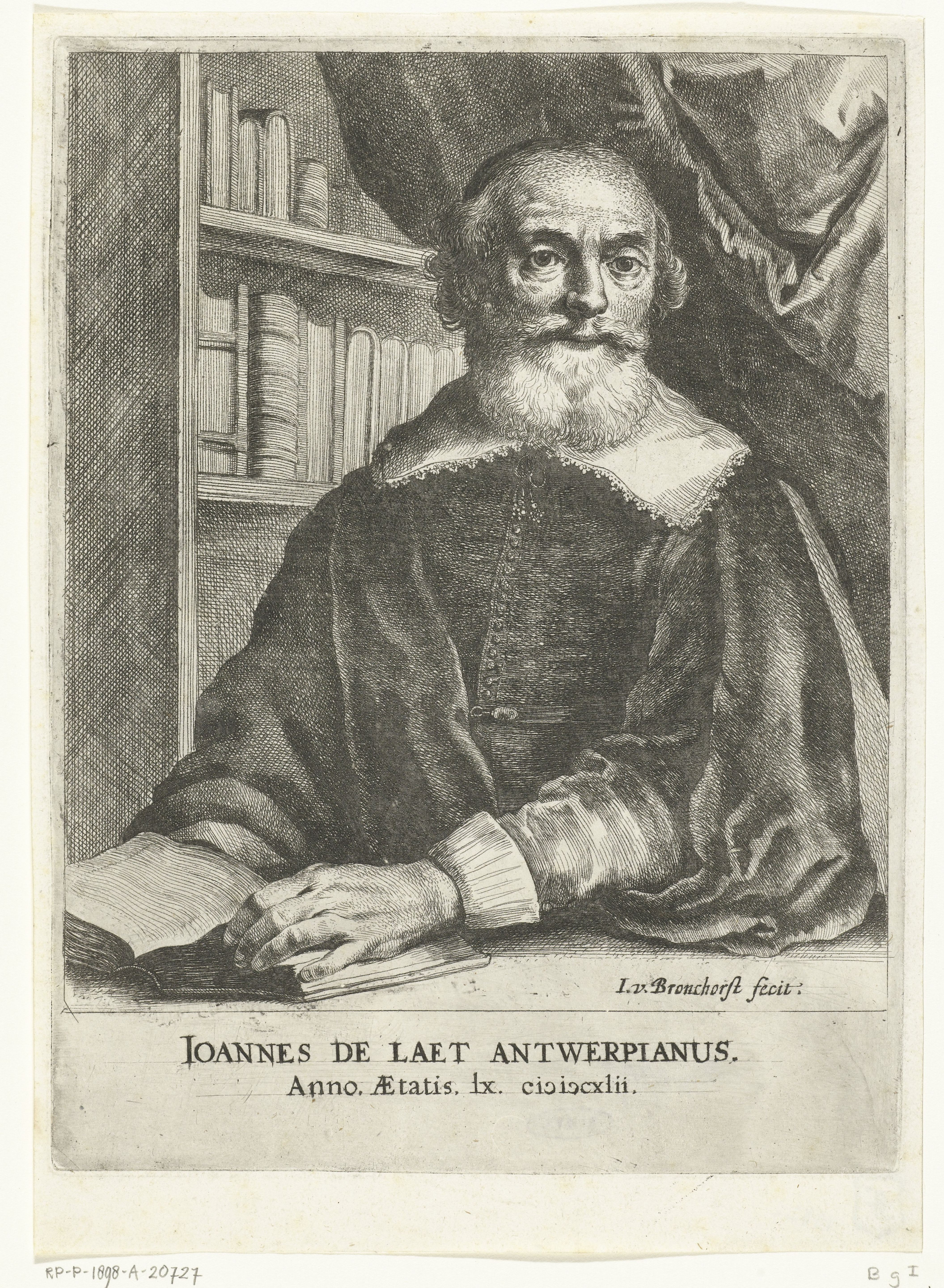
- Portrait of Johannes de Laet, aged sixty (1642)
- Born: 1581; Antwerp, Spanish Netherlands
- Died: December 1649; The Hague, Dutch Republic
- Burial place: Pieterskerk, Leiden
- Education: Leiden University
- Occupations: Geographer, merchant, and writer
- Known for: Nieuwe Wereldt ofte Beschrijvinghe van West-Indien; director of the Dutch West India Company

Joannes or Johannes De Laet (Latinized as Ioannes Latius) (1581 in Antwerp – buried 15 December 1649, in Leiden) was a Dutch geographer and director of the Dutch West India Company. Philip Burden called his History of the New World, "...arguably the finest description of the Americas published in the seventeenth century" and "...one of the foundation maps of Canada". De Laet was the first to print maps with the names Manhattan, New Amsterdam (now New York City) and Massachusetts.

== Early life and education ==
De Laet was born in Antwerp in 1581. In 1585, when he was about three years old, the city fell to Spanish forces during the Eighty Years' War. His family left Antwerp and settled in Amsterdam in the northern Netherlands.

De Laet later studied theology and philosophy at Leiden University, where one of his teachers was the humanist scholar Joseph Justus Scaliger.

In 1603, at about the age of 22, De Laet was sent to London to gain experience as a merchant. While there he married Jacobmijntje van Loor, the daughter of a prosperous Anglo-Dutch merchant. She died after only four years of marriage and he returned to Leiden in 1607.

== Career ==
=== Dutch West India Company ===
De Laet increased his fortune through investments in land reclamation projects and overseas trade. In 1620 he became one of the founding directors of the Dutch West India Company, a position he held for the remainder of his life. As a director he was involved in the administration of the company during the early decades of Dutch commercial expansion in the Atlantic world.

The company played an important role in Dutch trade and colonial activity in the Americas and West Africa. Through his position De Laet had access to reports from explorers, merchants and colonial officials working in these regions. These accounts provided information about geography, trade routes and newly encountered lands and peoples.

De Laet drew on this material in his geographical writings on the Americas and the Caribbean. His descriptions of the New World combined information gathered through the company's activities with material drawn from earlier printed sources and travel accounts. These works helped circulate geographical knowledge about the Americas among European readers during the seventeenth century.

=== Publishing ===
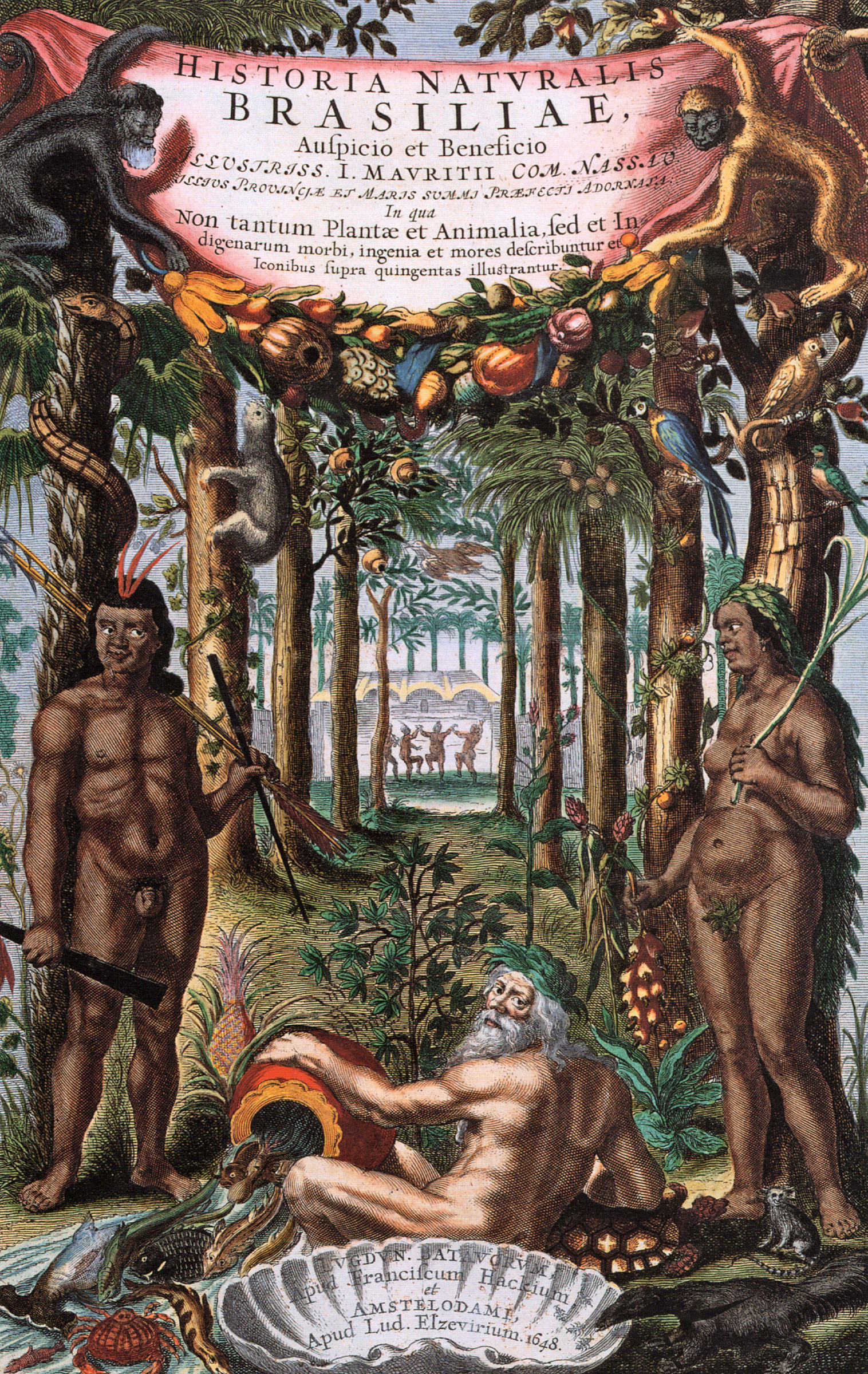
Historia Naturalis Brasiliae, to which De Laet contributed significantly

He published widely on topics ranging from church history to world history.

He played a crucial role in the 1648 publication of Historia Naturalis Brasiliae, a compendium of research on the flora and fauna of Brazil by Georg Marcgraf and Willem Piso, whose patron was Johan Maurits, governor of Dutch Brazil.

Marcgraf had written his portion of the work in a secret cipher, but died before the work was published. De Laet decoded it. A further contribution by De Laet was his preface to this important work, which emphasized the comparability of Northeast Brazil with other areas with a similar climate. The work subsequently circulated widely in northern Europe and beyond in scientific circles, and was not supplanted as an authoritative text for a hundred fifty years.

He also edited Pliny's Historia naturalis and Vitruvius' De architectura, wrote a detailed account of the New World and compiled an (unpublished) Old English-Latin dictionary – to mention just a selection of his forty publications.

=== Correspondents ===
His correspondents include the English antiquaries William Camden, Sir Henry Spelman, Sir William Boswell, Abraham Wheelock, Sir Simonds D'Ewes, James Usher, Patrick Young, John Morris, and the Danish antiquary Ole Worm.

== Death ==
De Laet died in December 1649 in The Hague, aged 68. He was buried in the Pieterskerk, Leiden.

== Works ==
=== History of the New World ===
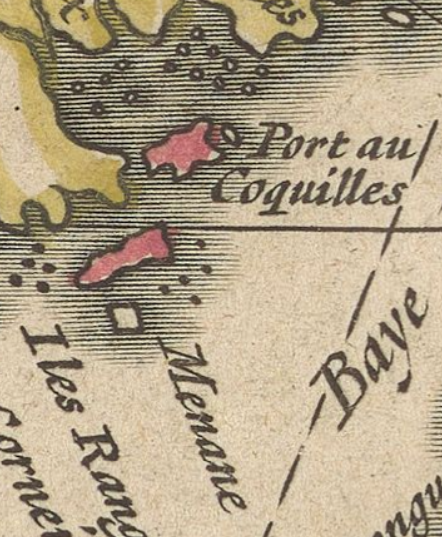
Grand Manan and Campobello island as shown on the 1630 map of de Laet.

His History of the New World was published in several editions by Bonaventure & Abraham Elseviers, Leiden. The first edition was published in Dutch in 1625 as Nieuwe Wereldt ofte Beschrijvinghe van West-Indien, uit veelerhande Schriften ende Aen-teekeningen van verscheyden Natien; a second edition also in Dutch, came out in 1630 as Beschrijvinghe van West-Indien door Joannes De Laet. Tweede druk: In ontallycke placesen verbetert, vermeerdert, met eenige nieuwe caerten, beelden van verscheijden dieren ende planten verciert.

A Latin edition from 1633, prepared by himself, was entitled Novus Orbis seu descriptionis Indiae Occidentalis Libri XVIII authore Joanne De Laet Antverp. Novis tabulis geographicis et variis animantium, Plantarum Fructuumque iconibus illustrata; in 1640 he published a French edition, in his own translation, as L'Histoire du Nouveau Monde ou description des Indes Occidentales, contenant dix-huict livres, enrichi de nouvelles tables geographiqiues & figures des animaux, plantes & fruicts.

Each successive edition had significantly updated maps.

=== Other works ===
- Hispania sive de Regis Hispaniae regnis et Opibus, Commentarius, Lugd. Batav. [i.e. Leiden]: Elzevir, 1629 (Respublicae Elzevirianae (a.k.a. Elzivirian Republics) series.
- Persia seu Regni Persici Status Variaque Itinera in atque per Persiam : cum Aliquot Iconibus Incolarum, LVGD. BATAV. ex officina Elzeviriana, Anna MDCXXXIII (1633) (Respublicae Elzevirianae (a.k.a. Elzivirian Republics) series.
- The Empire of the Great Mogul, translated by J.S. Hoyland with S.N. Bannerjee. Taraporevela, Bombay, 1928. Reissued Munshiram Manoharlal, New Delhi, 1975, ISBN 81-7069-041-2.

== Notes and references ==
=== References ===
- J. A. F. Bekkers, Correspondence of John Morris with Johannes de Laet (1634–1649) (Assen, 1970).
- Rolf H. Bremmer Jr and P. G. Hoftijzer, eds., Johannes de Laet (1581-169): A Leiden Polymath, special issue of Lias. Sources and Documents Relating to the Early Modern History of Ideas, vol. 25/2 (1998), 135–229, with contributions on the contents of his scholarly correspondence, his role in the Synod of Dort, his polemics with Hugo Grotius on the origin of the Native Americans, on his personal library, and on his Vitruvius edition.
- Rolf H. Bremmer Jr, '"Mine is Bigger than Yours": The Anglo-Saxon Collections of Johannes de Laet (1581-1649) and Sir Symonds D'Ewes', Anglo-Saxon Books and Their Readers, ed. Thomas N. Hall and Donald Scragg (Kalamazoo, MI, 2008), 136–174.
- Michiel van Groesen, "The Anglo-Dutch Lake? Johannes de Laet and the Ideological Origins of the Dutch and English West Indies", International Journal of Maritime History 34-4 (2022): 561-575.
- Oxford Dictionary of National Biography
- Genealogical date from Descendants of Johannes de Laet (in Dutch)
