= Selena (given name) =

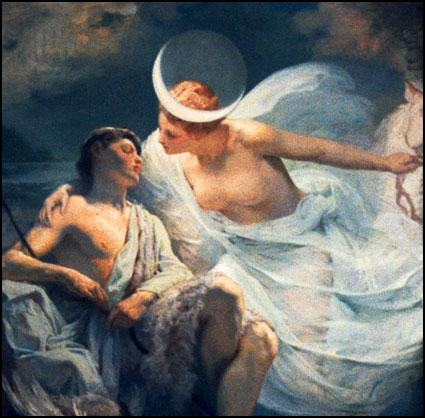
- Selene and Endymion by Albert Louis Aublet.
- Gender: female

Origin
- Language: Greek
- Meaning: Moon

Other names
- Related names: Celina, Salina, Selene, Selina

Selena (/səˈliːnə/) is a feminine given name, a probable variant of Selene, the goddess and personification of the Moon in Greek mythology and religion.

People with the name include:

- Selena (Selena Quintanilla-Pérez; 1971–1995), American singer
- Selena (Sabina Brons-Quack; born 1965), Dutch singer
- Selena Babb (born 1995), Dutch footballer
- Selena Sloan Butler (1872–1964) American founder and president of parent-teacher organizations
- Selena Coppa (born 1983), military intelligence Sergeant in the United States Army
- Selena Cuffe (born 1975), American businesswoman
- Selena Forrest (born 1999), American fashion model
- Selena Fox (born 1949), American Wiccan priestess
- Selena Gomez (born 1992), American singer, songwriter and actress
- Selena Lee (born 1981), Chinese-Canadian actress
- Selena Lee (born 1995), American singer-songwriter
- Selena Li (born 1981), Hong Kong actress and beauty contestant
- Selena Milán (born 2000), Spanish influencer
- Selena Millares (born 1963), Spanish writer and professor
- Selena Milošević (born 1989), Croatian handball player
- Selena Piek (born 1991), Dutch badminton player
- Selena Roberts (born 1966), American sponsors and sportswriter
- Selena Royle (1904–1983), American actress
- Selena M. Salcedo, American soldier convicted of assaulting an Afghan prisoner who later died
- Selena Samuela, Italian-American fitness instructor
- Selena Tan (born 1971), Singaporean actress

== Fictional characters ==
- Selena Cross, a character in the novel Peyton Place and Return to Peyton Place
- Selena, main character in the film 28 Days Later
- Selena, a character in the MOBA game Mobile Legends: Bang Bang
- Selena Kyle, hidden identity of DC Comics villain Catwoman
- Selena St. George, a character in Stephen King's Dolores Claiborne

== See also ==
- Serena (disambiguation)
