= Selina (disambiguation) =

Selina is a given name.

Selina may also refer to:

- Selina (beetle), genus of beetles
- Selina River, a river in Romania
- Lake Selina, a lake in Tasmania
- Selina, Sveti Lovreč, a village in Croatia

== See also ==
- Celina (disambiguation)
- Salina (disambiguation)
- Saline (disambiguation)
- Seline (disambiguation)
