= Selena Lee =

Selena Lee may refer to:

- Selena Lee (singer), American singer and songwriter
- Selena Lee (actress), Hong Kong actress
