= Celine (disambiguation) =

Celine or Céline may refer to:

== People ==
- Louis-Ferdinand Céline, French writer

== Places ==
- Celine, Krško, a small settlement in the Krško municipality in Slovenia

=== Croatia ===
- Celine, Jastrebarsko, a village in Zagreb County, belonging to the wider area of the town of Jastrebarsko
- Celine, Međimurje County, a village in the Podturen municipality in Međimurje County
- Celine, Vrbovec, a village in Zagreb County, belonging to the wider area of the town of Vrbovec
- Celine Goričke, a village in the Marija Gorica municipality in Zagreb County
- Celine Samoborske, a village in Zagreb County, belonging to the wider area of the town of Samobor

== Film and television ==
- Céline (1992 film), French drama film directed by Jean-Claude Brisseau
- Céline (2008 film), TV biopic on singer Céline Dion directed by Jeff Woolnough
- Celine: Through the Eyes of the World, 2010 documentary-concert film about Celine Dion
- Celine and Julie Go Boating (Céline et Julie vont en bateau), a 1974 French film directed by Jacques Rivette
- Celine, the dog belonging to fictional drama teacher Mr G from the series Summer Heights High
- Celine, fictional character in the Alien Nation television series

== Other ==
- "Céline" (song), a 1966 song by Hugues Aufray
- "Celine", a poem by Patti Smith from her 1972 Seventh Heaven (poetry collection)
- Celine (brand), a French luxury fashion house founded in 1945 by Céline Vipiana
- Celine (concert residency), a concert residency by Celine Dion in Las Vegas
- Hagbard Celine, an important character in the Illuminatus trilogy of books

== See also ==
- Celina (disambiguation)
- Selina (disambiguation)
