= Silene (disambiguation) =

Silene is a genus of plants.

Silene may also refer to:

- Silenes, chemical compounds containing a Si=Si moiety
- Silenes (Si=C), chemical compounds containing a Si=C moiety
- Silene, a Silenus-like figure in decorative art
- Silene, the location of the story of Saint George and the Dragon
- Silene, Skrudaliena Parish, a village in Skrudaliena Parish, Latvia
- Silene, Saliena Parish, a village in Saliena Parish, Latvia
- Silenė, one of the lands of the historical Semigallia, Latvia

== See also ==
- Silylene, another class of silicon compounds
- Silanes
- Selene (disambiguation)
- Seline (disambiguation)
- Silen (disambiguation)
- Sylene
