= Pisoniella =

Scientific classification
- Kingdom: Plantae
- Clade: Tracheophytes
- Clade: Angiosperms
- Clade: Eudicots
- Order: Caryophyllales
- Family: Nyctaginaceae
- Genus: Pisoniella; Standl.
- Species: P. arborescens

Binomial name
- Pisoniella arborescens (Lag. & Rodr.) Standl.

Synonyms
- Boerhavia arborescens Lag. & Rodr.; Pisonia arborescens (Lag. & Rodr.) Kuntze

Species of flowering plant

Pisoniella is a monotypic genus of flowering plants belonging to the family Nyctaginaceae. It only contains one known species, Pisoniella arborescens (Lag. & Rodr.) Standl.

It is native to (northwestern) Argentina, Bolivia and Mexico.

The genus name of Pisoniella is in honour of Willem Piso (1611–1678), a Dutch physician and naturalist who participated as an expedition doctor in Dutch Brazil from 1637 – 1644. The Latin specific epithet of arborescens refers to arboreus meaning tree-like. Both the genus and the species were first described and published in Contr. U.S. Natl. Herb. Vol.13 on page 385 in 1911.

it has one known subspecies; Pisoniella arborescens var. glabrata (Heimerl) Heimerl from Bolivia and northwestern Argentina.
