= Celina (given name) =

Feminine given name derived from the Roman name Cecilia

- Pronunciation: /səˈliːnə/
- Gender: female

Origin
- Language: Latin
- Meaning: “Woman from the Caecilia gens.”

Other names
- Related names: Cecilia, Céline, Marcel, Selena, Selene, Selin, Selina

Celina (/səˈliːnə/) is a feminine given name derived from the Roman name Cecilia, referring to a woman from the Caecilia gens. Alternately, it is considered a form of the name Marceline, a French feminine form of the name Marcel. The French version of the name is Céline. The name has also been considered a variation of the name Selene, the Greek goddess and personification of the Moon, and its variants Selena and Selina.

== People ==
- Celina González (1929–2015), Cuban singer and songwriter
- Celina Hinchcliffe (born 1976), English television sports broadcaster
- Celina Jade (born 1985), Hong Kong-American actress, singer, songwriter, model and martial artist
- Celina Jaitly (born 1981), Indian actress
- Celina Jesionowska (born 1933), Polish sprinter
- Celina Kanunnikava, Polish-Belarusian artist
- Celina Leão (born 1977), Brazilian business administrator and politician
- Celina Mays (born 1984), a missing girl from New Jersey that disappeared on December 15, 1996
- Celina Midelfart (born 1973), Norwegian businesswoman
- Celina Ree (born 1990), Danish pop rock singer and songwriter
- Celina Seghi (born 1920–2022), Italian former alpine skier

=== Celena ===
- Célena Cherry (born 1977), lead singer of the Honeyz
- Celena Shafer (born c. 1975), American operatic soprano

== Notes ==
Media related to Celina (given name) at Wikimedia Commons
