= Selin Kara =

Turkish-born chemist and biotechnologist

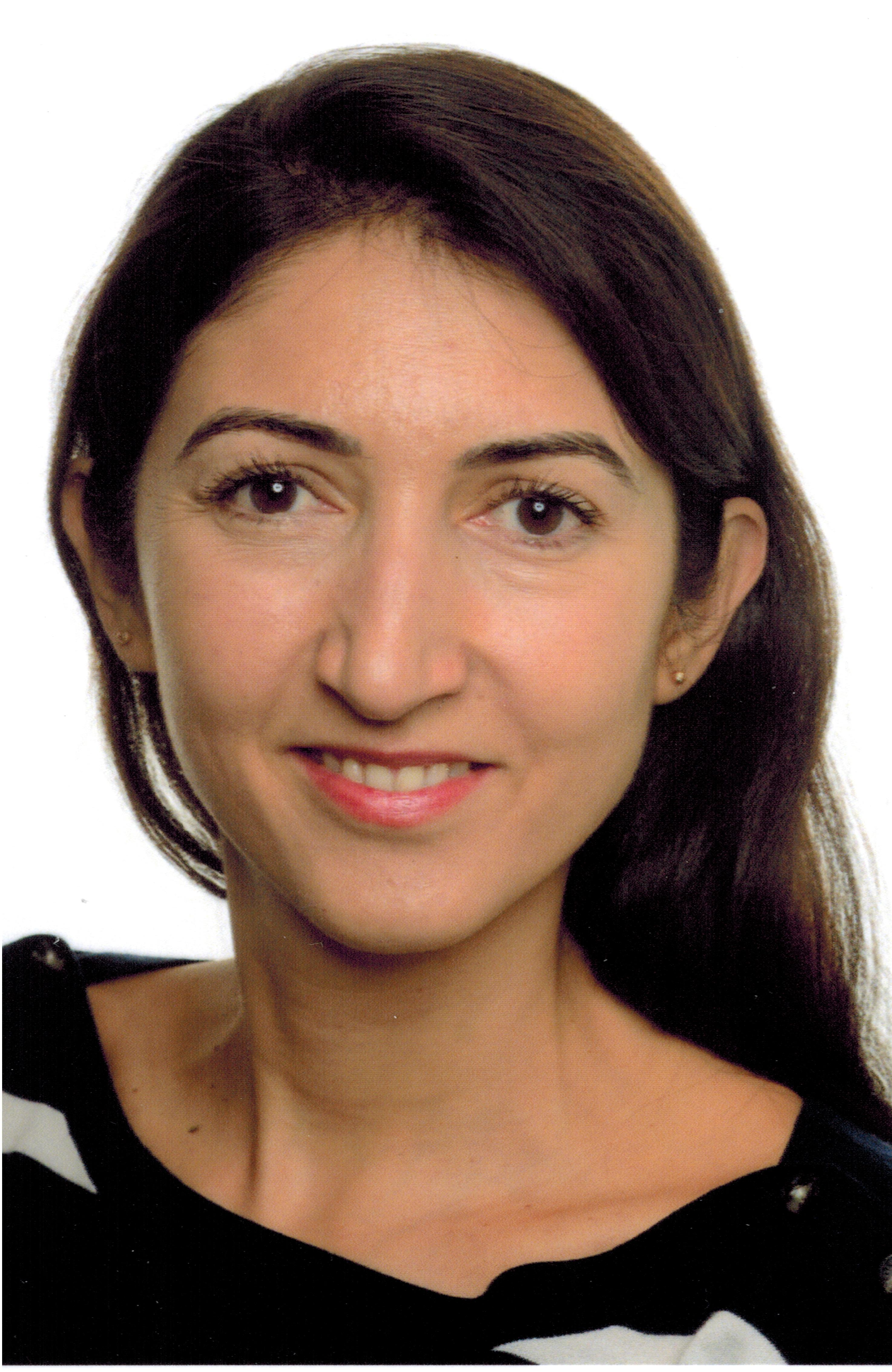
Selin Kara

Selin Kara (born 20 January 1981) is a Turkish-born chemist and biotechnologist. She is currently a full professor and head of Industrial Biotechnology section at Aarhus University. She studies biocatalysis and has been recognized for her work about deep eutectic solvents and her research regarding cofactor regeneration in biotransformations.

== Books and publications ==
- Recent trends and novel concepts in cofactor-dependent biotransformations
- Deep eutectic solvents as efficient solvents in biocatalysis
- Enantioselective oxidation of aldehydes catalyzed by alcohol dehydrogenase
- Access to lactone building blocks via horse liver alcohol dehydrogenase-catalyzed oxidative lactonization
- One-pot combination of enzyme and Pd nanoparticle catalysis for the synthesis of enantiomerically pure 1,2-amino alcohols
- A bi‐enzymatic convergent cascade for ε‐caprolactone synthesis employing 1, 6‐hexanediol as a ‘double‐smart cosubstrate’
- More efficient redox biocatalysis by utilising 1, 4-butanediol as a ‘smart cosubstrate’
- A fed‐batch synthetic strategy for a three‐step enzymatic synthesis of poly‐ϵ‐caprolactone

== Awards and honors ==
- 2026 - biocat Award for outstanding contributions to the field of biocatalysis
- 2018 - ChemCatChem - Young Researcher Series
- 2016 - Selected Membership of Zukunftsforum Biotechnologie DECHEMA
- 2015 - DAAD Conference Travel Award
- 2014 - Conference Travel Award – Frauenförderung at TU Dresden
- 2013 - Biotrans 2013 Poster Prize
