= Seline =

Seline may refer to:

- Seline, Croatia, a village in Croatia
- Seline (restaurant), a restaurant in Santa Monica, California
- Seline (singer), South Korean singer, member of Cignature
- Seline Hizli, English actress

== See also ==
- Celine (disambiguation)
- Selin (disambiguation)
- Silene (disambiguation)
- Selene (disambiguation)
