= Selene (disambiguation) =

Selene was the personification of the Moon in Greek mythology.

Selene may also refer to:

== Astronomy ==
- Selene, another name for the Moon of Earth
- 580 Selene, a minor planet orbiting the Sun

== Animals ==
- Selene (fish), a genus of fishes in the family Carangidae
- Actias selene, a species of moth

== Characters ==
- Selene (Underworld), a character in the film Underworld
- Selene (comics), a Marvel Comics supervillain
- Selene, an alias used by Lanfear in Robert Jordan's Wheel of Time series
- Selene, a fictionalized depiction of the moon goddess in the movie Zenon: Z3
- Adam Selene, a character in Robert Heinlein's The Moon Is a Harsh Mistress
- Selene (Cro character), fictional sabretooth tiger in TV series Cro
- Cure Selene, a character in the Toei anime series Star Twinkle PreCure
- Selene Lindstrom, a character in Isaac Asimov's novel The Gods Themselves
- Selene, the female player character in Pokémon Sun, Moon, Ultra Sun, and Ultra Moon

== Music ==
- Selene, an album by musician Max Tannone
- Selene, a song in Imagine Dragons' album Night Visions
- My Selene, a song by Finnish power metal band Sonata Arctica in the album Reckoning Night

== People ==
- Selene (given name), the name

== Places ==
- Selene, Queensland, a locality in the North Burnett Region, Queensland, Australia
- Selene (building), a skyscraper in New York City

== Vehicles ==
- SELENE (also named Kaguya), a Japanese lunar orbiter
- HMS Selene (P254), a 1944 British submarine
- Ghia Selene, a 1959 concept car from the Ghia design studio

== Other uses ==
- Ethinylestradiol/cyproterone acetate, a birth control pill

== See also ==
- Similar names Silene (disambiguation), Celina (disambiguation), Celine, Selina, Selena
- Celene (disambiguation)
- Cleopatra Selene (disambiguation)
- Selen (disambiguation)
- Selenium, the chemical element named after the Greek word "selene" meaning "moon"
