= Celene =

Celene may refer to:

- geography:
  - the Spanish Galician town of Caldas de Reis, Ancient Aquae Celenae, notably as Latin titular bishopric
  - the Ancient Phrygian town of Celaenae (Latin; Greek Κελαιναί, Kelainái), now in Anatolia (Asian Turkey)
- the Faerie Kingdom of Celene in the fictional World of Greyhawk
- Celene Ibrahim, an American Islamic scholar
- an alternate spelling of Selene (various senses)
