= Selen =

Selen may refer to

- Chemical element selenium, which is called selen in multiple languages
- Selen (actress) (born Luce Caponegro in 1966), Italian actress and TV presenter
- Selen (name)
- RV MTA Selen, a Turkish research vessel

== See also ==
- Selene (disambiguation)
- Selens, a commune in the Aisne department in Hauts-de-France in northern France
