= Selena (disambiguation) =

Selena (1971–1995) was an American singer.

Selena may also refer to:

== Music and media ==
- Selena (album), Selena's debut album
- Selena (film), a 1997 American biographical drama film about Selena
  - Selena (soundtrack), a soundtrack album to the film
  - Selena Forever, musical based on the film
- Selena y Los Dinos, Selena's Tejano band
- Selena's Secret, a 2018 American television series based on Selena's murder
- Selena: The Series, a 2020–2021 American biographical drama web television series about Selena

== People ==
- Selena (given name), list of people with the name
- Selena (Dutch singer)

== Other uses ==
- Selena Etc., South Texas-based boutique, salon, and clothing store built by Selena Quintanilla-Pérez, created a fan club
- Selena Auditorium, part of the American Bank Center entertainment complex in Corpus Christi, Texas

== See also ==
- Selina, given name
- Serena (disambiguation)
