= William Ablett =

French painter, designer and engraver

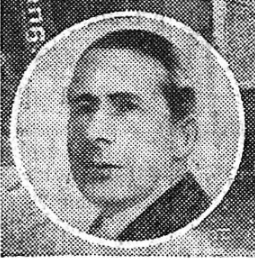
William Ablett; from his obituary in Le Matin

William Albert Ablett (9 July 1877 – 25 April 1936) was a French painter, designer and engraver of English ancestry. He is best known for his fashionable portraits of women.

== Biography ==
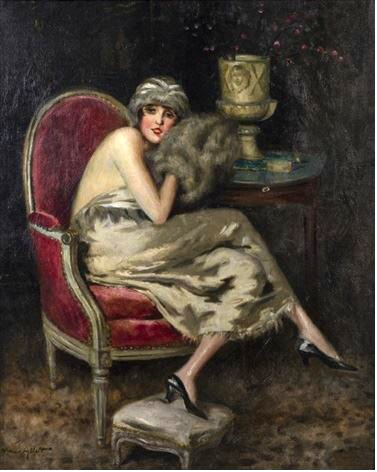
Girl with a Muff

He was born in Paris. His father, William James Ablett (1843–1909), was President of the British Chambers of Commerce office in France. In 1897, he entered the École nationale supérieure des Beaux-Arts as a foreign student.

He studied with Jean-Léon Gérôme and Albert Aublet, who would also become his friend. In 1900, he was awarded a second prize for his drawings from nature at the Salon. In 1905, he was awarded a silver medal at the Exposition Universelle de Liège.

In 1907, he became a member of the Cercle de l'Union artistique. He was a regular exhibitor at the Société nationale des beaux-arts from 1910 to 1936; presenting mostly portraits and genre scenes.

He began working with engravings during the early 1920s, primarily illustrations for magazines and reviews. Many of his works were female figures related to fashion and the decorative arts, done as colored etchings.

In 1930, he was named a Knight in the Legion of Honor. He was also elected to the Royal Academy of Arts.

The following year, his daughter, Marie-Germaine Ablett, married the architect, Louis Aublet, the son of his former teacher and friend Albert Aublet

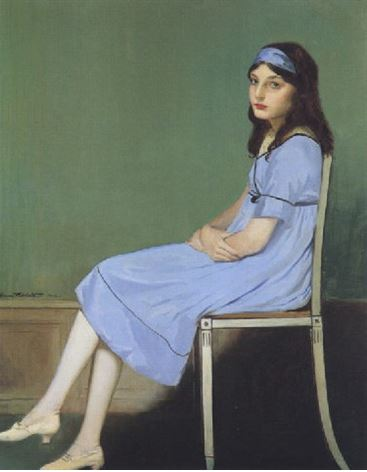
Portrait of the Artist's Daughter

He was fatally injured in an automobile accident in an alley near the Bois de Boulogne, and died the following morning at Beaujon Hospital.
