= Sellin (disambiguation) =

Sellin is a municipality in Mecklenburg-Vorpommern, Germany.

Sellin may also refer to:

== People ==
- David Sellin (1930–2006), American historian
- Debbie Sellin (born 1964), British Anglican bishop
- Ernst Sellin (1867–1946), German theologian
- Gustaf Adolf Sellin, Swedish skier
- Jarosław Sellin (born 1963), Polish politician
- Johannes Sellin (born 1990), German handball player
- Kjell Rune Sellin (born 1989), Norwegian footballer
- Robbin Sellin (born 1990), Swedish footballer
- Thorsten Sellin (1896–1994), American sociologist

== Other uses ==
- 5789 Sellin, main-belt asteroid

== See also ==
- Fannie Sellins (1872–1919), American union organizer
- Selin (disambiguation)
- Sillen
