= Philip Burden =

American geographer

Philip D. Burden is a geographer, map dealer and historian. He is best known as the author of The Mapping of North America: A List of Printed Maps 1511–1670 and The Mapping of North America II: A List of Printed Maps 1671–1700. These books are widely considered the authoritative works on the topic of historic North American cartography.

== Works ==
- The Mapping of North America: A List of Printed Maps 1511–1670 (1996). Raleigh Publications, Rickmansworth, Hertfordshire, UK. ISBN 0952773309.
- The Mapping of North America II: A List of Printed Maps 1671–1700 (2007). Raleigh Publications, Rickmansworth, Hertfordshire, UK. ISBN 0952773317.
