= Salena, Nepal =

Salena, Nepal सालेना
- Village development committee
- Nickname: meaning Moon Goddess
- Location in Nepal
- Coordinates: 29.45°N 80.45°E
- Country: Nepal
- Zone: Mahakali Zone
- District: Baitadi District

Population (1991)
  - Total: 2,842
  - Religions: Hindu
- Time zone: UTC+5:45 (Nepal Time)

Salena is a village development committee in Baitadi District in the Mahakali Zone of western Nepal. At the time of the 1991 Nepal census it had a population of 2,842 and had 478 houses in the village.
