= Selina Kyle (disambiguation) =

Selina Kyle is the civilian identity of the DC Comics character Catwoman.

Selina Kyle may also refer to:

- Selina Kyle (Batman Returns), a character portrayed by Michelle Pfeiffer in 1992 film Batman Returns
- "Selina Kyle" (Gotham episode), the second episode of the TV series Gotham
- Selina Kyle (Gotham character), a fictional character on TV based on the DC Comics character
