= Smart cosubstrate =

A smart cosubstrate is a type of cosubstrate used for cofactor regeneration to yield greater productivity and lower environmental impact (E-factor). A good example of a smart cosubstrate is a lactonizable diol.

In redox biocatalysis, the nicotinamide cofactor (NAD(P)H or NAD(P)+) can act as an electron donor or acceptor by releasing or accepting a hydride. The cofactor must be used in the reaction either in stoichiometric amounts leading to inhibition and economic issues, or in catalytic amounts coupled with an in situ regeneration system. A common approach catalytic amounts is excess use of sacrificial organic molecules such as isopropanol or ethanol. This approach, however, leads to stoichiometric amounts of waste.

The use of 1,4-butanediol as a smart cosubstrate for cofactor regeneration was the next step towards more sustainable redox biocatalysis (Scheme 1). The formation of a thermodynamically stable gamma-butyrolactone as a co-product drives the reaction to completion while yielding higher reaction rates. The use of 1,4-butanediol as an intelligent cosubstrate has also been validated in non-aqueous media using a commercial ADH.

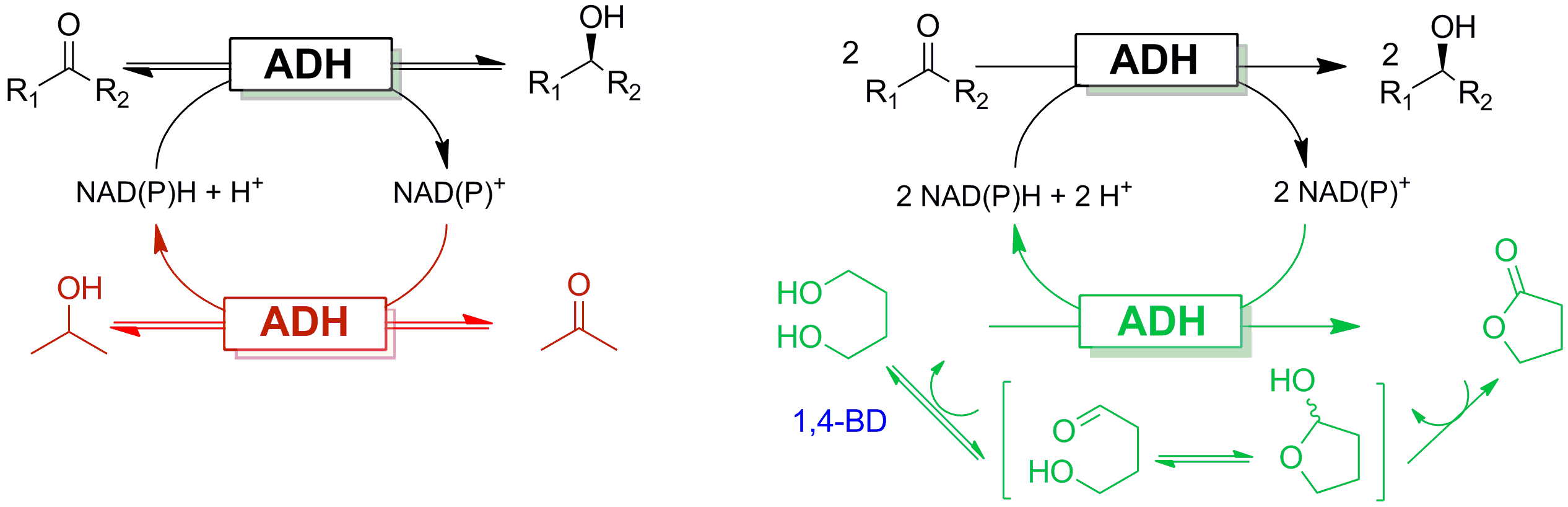
Comparison of the use of isopropanol (left) to the "smart cosubstrate" approach using 1,4-butanediol. The lactone coproduct makes the regeneration reaction irreversible

== Double-smart cosubstrate ==
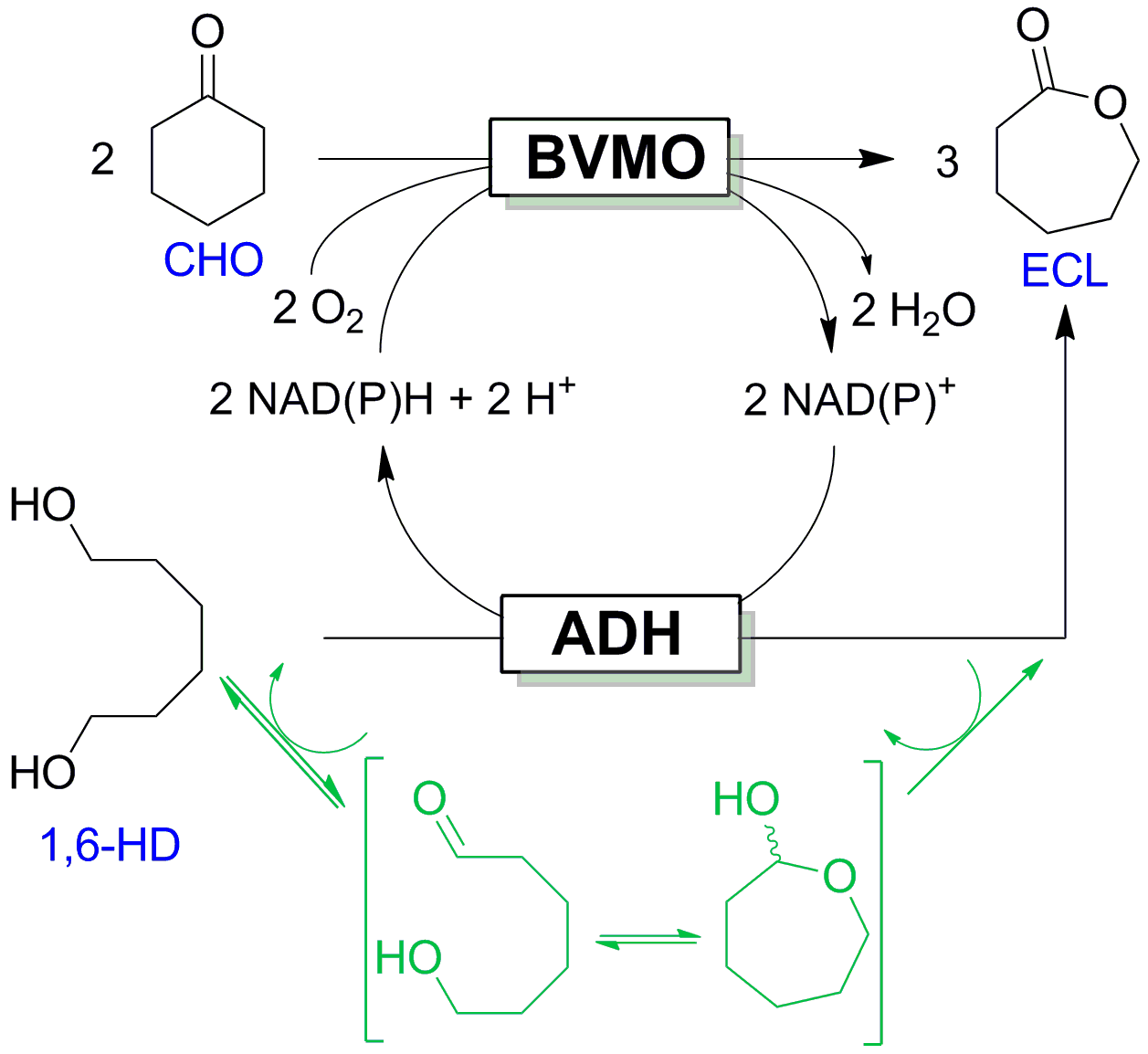
Synthesis of ɛ-caprolactone (ECL) through a convergent cascade system by coupling a Baeyer–Villiger monooxygenase (BVMO)-catalyzed oxidation of cyclohexanone (CHO) to ECL, promoted by an alcohol dehydrogenase (ADH)-catalyzed oxidation of the ‘double-smart cosubstrate’ 1,6-hexanediol (1,6-HD) for regeneration of NAD(P)H, yielding ECL.

Biocatalytic cascade reactions currently fall into four different categories:

1. Linear, which is biocatalytic
2. Orthogonal
3. Parallel
4. Cyclic

However, only two types of redox-neutral cascades have been reported for the in situ regeneration of the cofactors: parallel cascades (i.e., bi-substrate — no intermediate — bi- or tri-product) and linear cascades (i.e., single substrate — single intermediate — single product).

The concept of a smart cosubstrate was developed further through the design of a new class of redox-neutral "convergent cascade" reactions. Convergent cascade reactions involve a bi-substrate and a single product without the formation of an intermediate and were developed for the production of epsilon-caprolactone, which consists of a Baeyer-Villiger monooxygenase; for the oxidation of cyclohexanone; an alcohol dehydrogenase for oxidation of the "double-smart cosubstrate" 1,6-hexanediol; and for simultaneous regeneration of the nicotinamide cofactor. In 2016, two-step optimization of the convergent cascade by Design-of-Experiments and a biphasic system was reported.

Smart cosubstrates are an elegant solution for thermodynamically limited redox reactions and have many advantages:

1. Less conventional cosubstrates (e.g., isopropanol, ethanol) that negatively affect the enzymes’ activities need to be used.
2. Less waste is generated.
3. Reactions are faster, which could be caused by the absence of acetone or acetaldehyde as a coproduct, which lead to reduced enzyme activities.
