= Silen, Bulgaria =

Silen
- Village
- Location within Bulgaria
- Coordinates: 41°41′N 25°43′E
- Country: Bulgaria
- Province: Haskovo Province
- Municipality: Stambolovo

Area
  - Land: 8.773 km^{2} (3.387 sq mi)

Population (2013)
  - Total: 142
  - Density: 16.2/km^{2} (41.9/sq mi)
- Time zone: UTC+2 (EET)
  - Summer (DST): UTC+3 (EEST)

Silen is a village in Stambolovo Municipality, in Haskovo Province, in southern Bulgaria.
