= Selena Samuela =

Italian-American fitness instructor

- Born: Italy
- Occupation: Fitness instructor
- Employer: Peloton Interactive, Inc.
- Partner: Matt Virtue

Selena Samuela is an Italian-American Peloton instructor based in New York. She was born in Italy on an American military base as her father was in the US Army and lived there until she was two years old when her family relocated to Elmira, New York Her sister was born in Buffalo, NY when Selena was two.

Following college in Hawaii, Samuela moved to New York City where she studied acting at the Stella Adler Studio of Acting. She used stunt lessons as an attempt to begin work as an actor before becoming an amateur boxer following her work at Gleason's Gym. Samuela was recruited to work for Peloton Interactive after teaching fitness classes and working as a personal trainer at a boutique studio. In addition to fitness classes, Samuela is a runner and plays golf.

Samuela married Matt Virtue in Palm Beach, Florida in March 2022. She lives in Rye, New York.

Their son was born on December 17, 2022.
