= Selena Milán =

Spanish influencer (born 2000)

- Born: February 8, 2000 (age 26); Gran Canaria, Spain
- Occupations: YouTuber; writer; transgender rights activist

YouTube information
- Channel: Selena Milán
- Years active: 2016–present
- Genre: Vlogs
- Subscribers: 574 thousand
- Views: 91.2 million
- Last updated: October 21, 2025

Selena González Milán (born February 8, 2000) is a trans woman, and she is a YouTuber, writer, and member of Spanish ballroom culture.

== Early life ==
Milán grew up in Carrizal, Gran Canaria. Assigned male at birth, she experienced bullying at an early age due to her gender expression. She had strong family support, including from her mother, and came out at age 10 when her mother asked if she wanted to be a girl.

== Career ==
Selena Milán entered the public sphere when she launched her YouTube channel in 2016.

In 2021, in collaboration with Mediaset España platform, she launched the channel Caza de witches (Witch Hunt), on which Milán interviewed strangers on the street to discover their level of honesty through a series of questions. In September of the same year, she published her book Transapariencia: Soy Selena y soy una chica trans (Transparency: I'm Selena and I'm a Trans Girl). Milán's autobiography starts in early childhood, and covers her experience and transition as a trans person. She advocates that, although she underwent vaginoplasty, no surgery or medical intervention is necessary to be a valid trans person.

In 2024, she served as a jury member for the Drag Queen Gala of Las Palmas de Gran Canaria, where Drag Elektra was crowned the winner.

== Personal life ==
After moving to Madrid, Selena kept her identity as a trans woman secret, and it wasn't until two years later, at the age of 20, that she decided to come out publicly.
