= Patrik Selin =

Patrik Selin, also known as "Silent Selin" in the poker world, was the former CEO and president of the Ongame Network and Gnuf.com, and later chief executive officer of Bodog UK, an online gaming and entertainment website.

== Career ==
Following a period of senior management in the Internet banking sector in the late 1990s, Selin became president and CEO of the Ongame network, later selling it to Bwin for €475 million.

In 2005, Ongame was named IT Company of the Year by Sweden's business magazine Veckans Affärer. In the same year, Selin helped orchestrate the sale of Ongame to the Austrian publicly traded company Bwin (then BETandWIN.com Interactive Entertainment AG), a transaction which was completed in early 2006.

Following the sale of Ongame in 2006, Selin assumed the position of CEO at Gnuf.com, another online gambling website.

In September 2009, Selin announced that he had acquired the rights to source code of the Bodog poker product. Selin further secured the rights from the BodogBrand.com licensing enterprise to market the new poker network worldwide under the Bodog brand.

In June 2010, Selin became the CEO of Bodog UK, the first holder of the newly created UK licence. Bodog UK provides online sports betting and casino offering. In June 2012, Bodog was sold to Bodog88, and Selin resigned as CEO.

== Personal life ==
Selin finished in first place in the Ritz Club Poker Tournament in 2006, winning £22,000 and a trip and entry into the World Series of Poker (WSOP). In 2007, he was runner-up in the National Poker League tournament held in London. He also plays online under the nickname "Silent Selin".
