= Selin Arpaz =

German politician (born 1999)

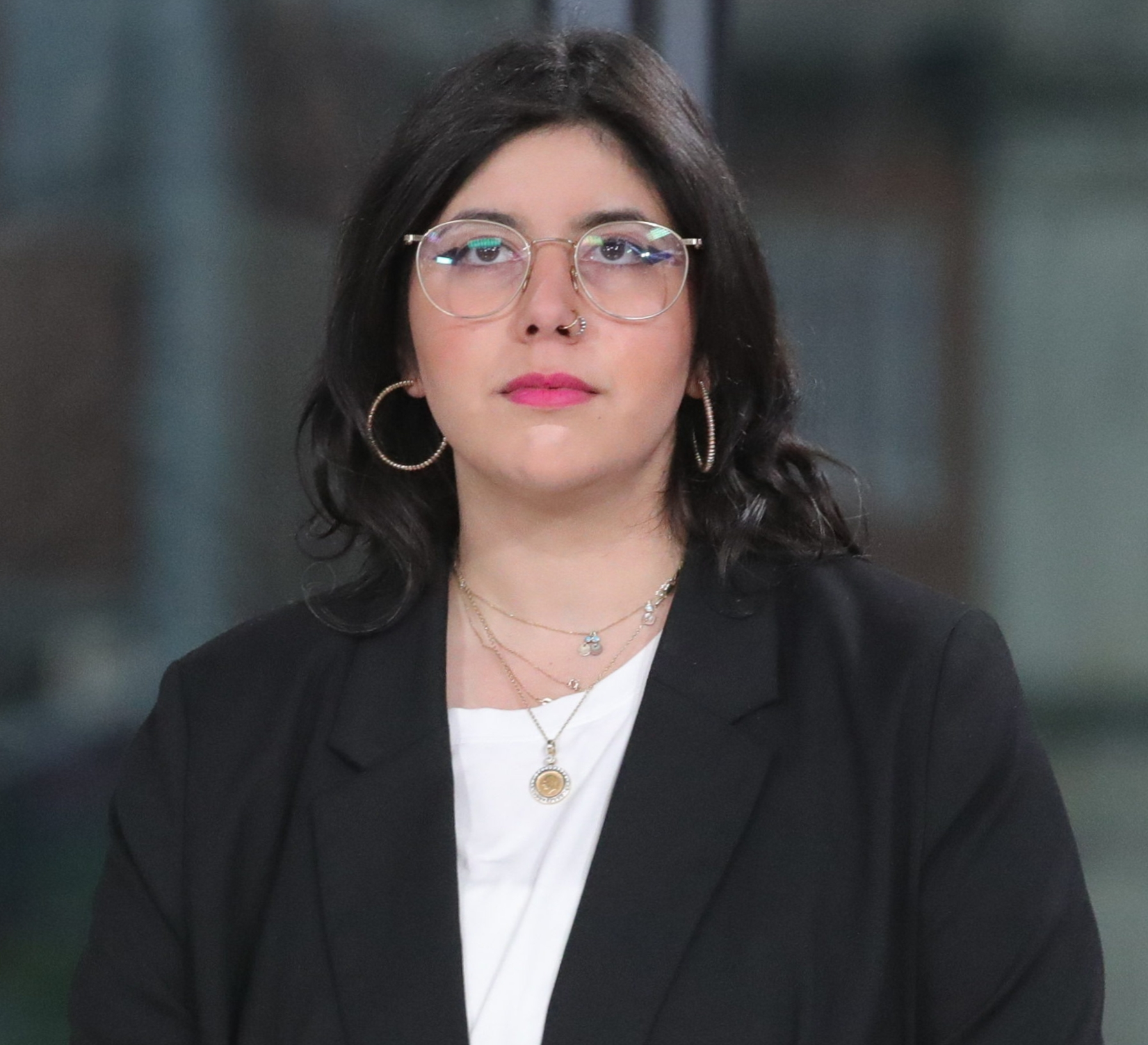
- Arpaz in 2023

Member of the Bürgerschaft of Bremen
- Incumbent
- Assumed office 29 June 2023

Personal details
- Born: 11 January 1999 (age 27)
- Party: Social Democratic Party (since 2017)

Selin Arpaz (born 11 January 1999) is a German politician who has served as a member of the Bürgerschaft of Bremen since 2023. She is the youngest current member of the Bürgerschaft.
