= Albert Aublet =

French painter (1851–1938)

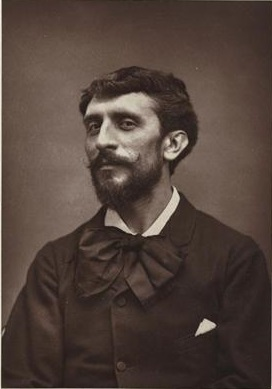
Albert Aublet (date unknown)

Albert Louis Aublet (French pronunciation: [albɛʁ oblɛ]; 18 January 1851 in Paris – 3 March 1938 in Neuilly-sur-Seine) was a French painter known primarily for his genre scenes and nudes.

== Biography ==
Trained in the workshops of Claudius Jacquand and Jean-Léon Gérôme, he had his first exhibit at the Salon in 1873. He received honorable mention there in 1879 and was awarded a third-class medal in 1880. He also collected medals at several international events, including the Exposition Universelle of 1889. He was decorated with the Legion of Honor in 1890.

During his overseas trip in 1881, his experiences in the Middle East had a profound influence on his artistic inspiration. Istanbul left an especially strong impression on him. His first Orientalist painting "Turkish Woman in the Baths" was a great success and he became President of the Société des Artistes in Tunis.

He was also a professor at the École nationale supérieure des Beaux-Arts, and is believed to have been the inspiration for M. Biche, a fictional painter in Remembrance of Things Past by Marcel Proust.

His son was the architect Louis Aublet (1901–1980), who married Marie-Germaine Ablett, daughter of the painter William Ablett, in 1931.

== Selected paintings ==
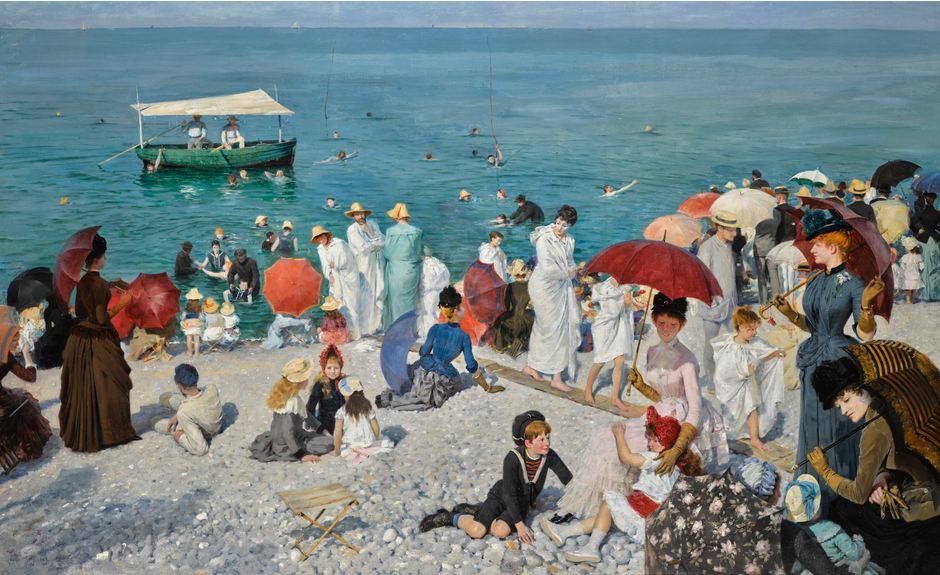
Bathing Time at Le Tréport

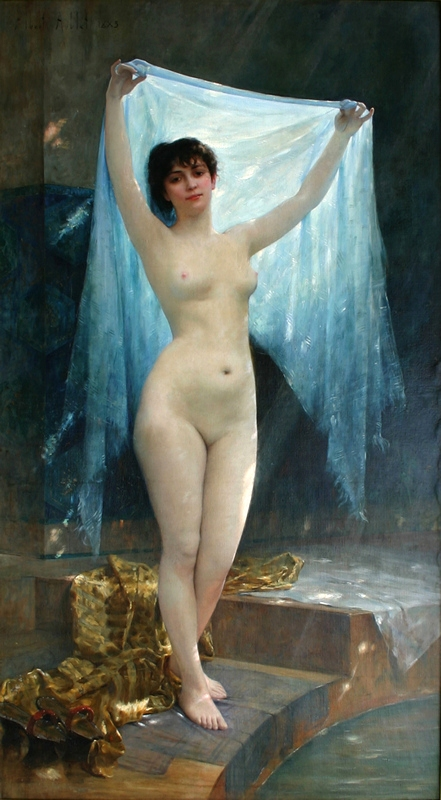
An Oriental Beauty

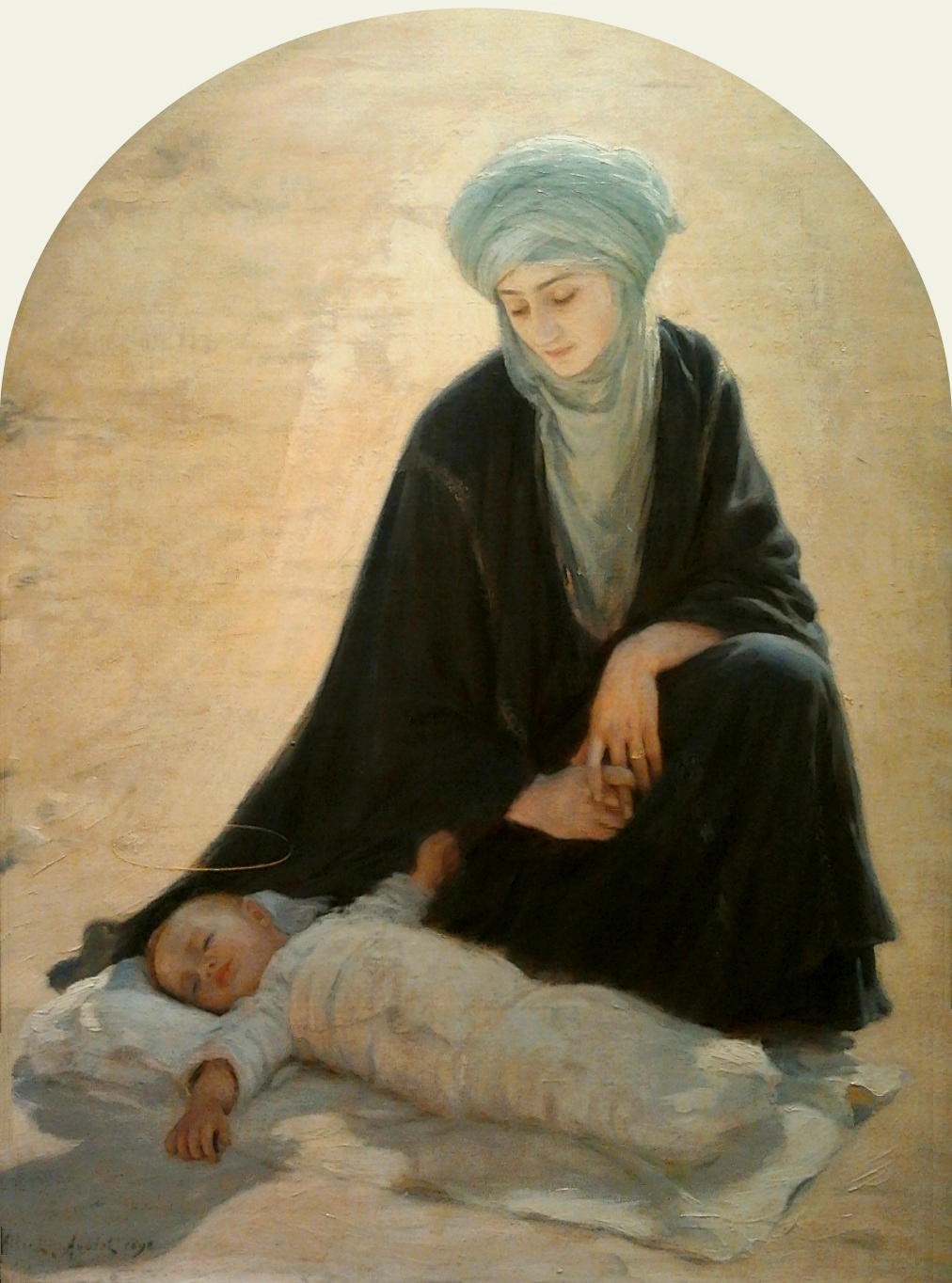
Arabic Madonna and Child

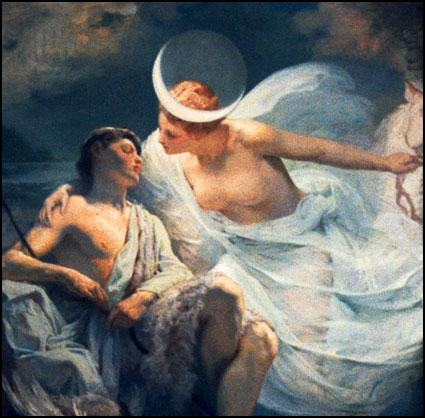
Selene and Endymion

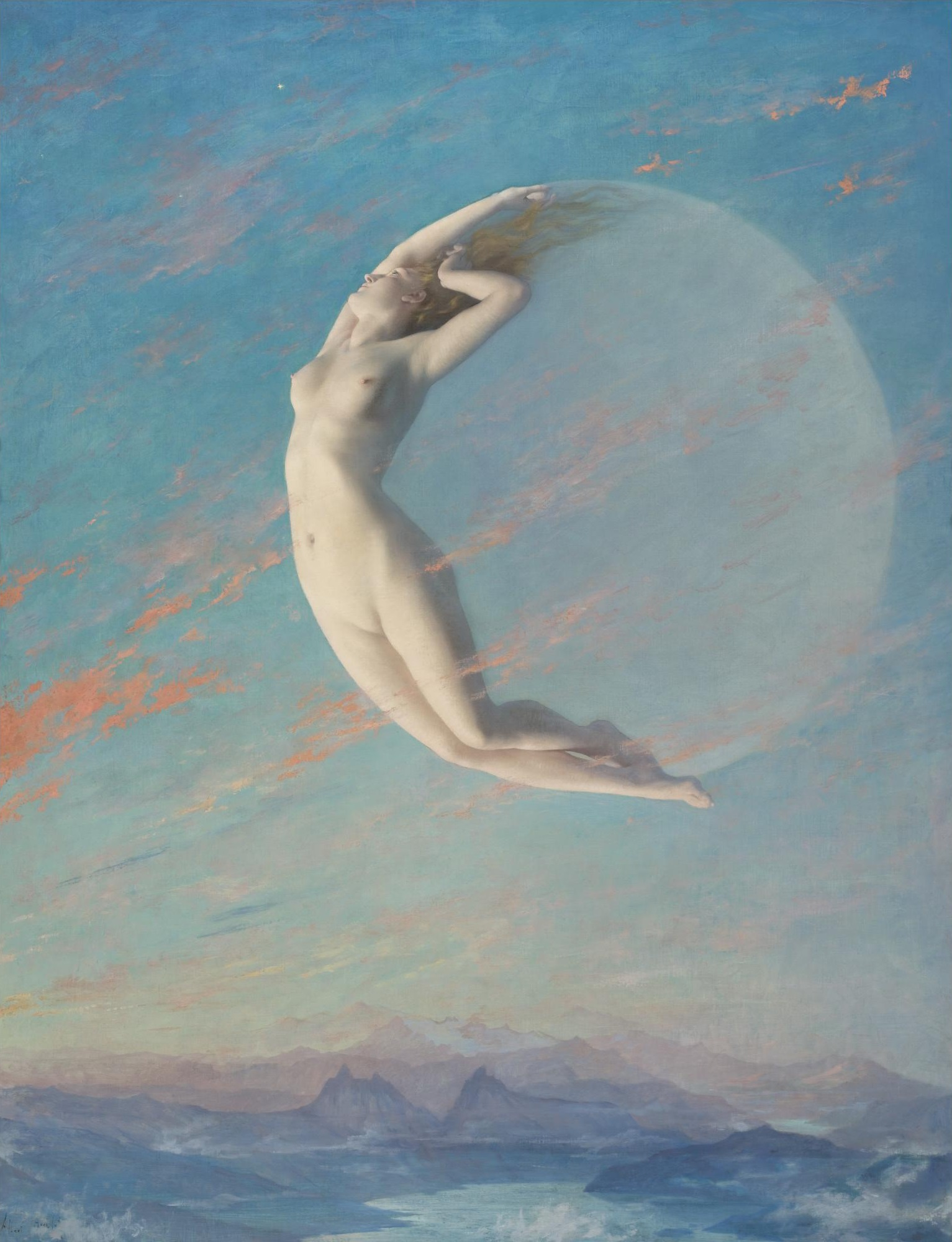
Selene
