= Selena Lee Canales =

American singer/songwriter (born 1995)

Selena Lee
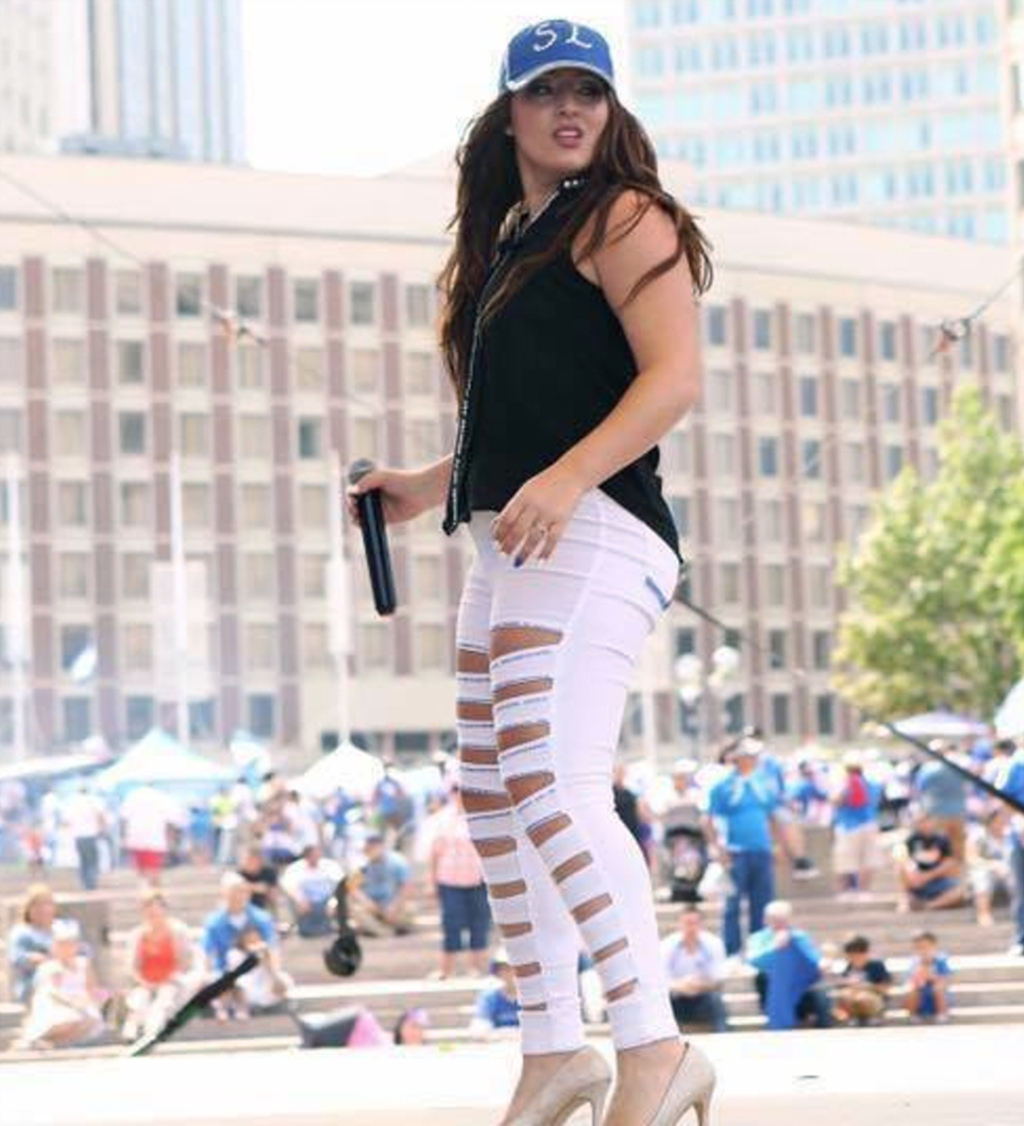

Background information
- Born: Selena Lee Canales; September 19, 1995 (age 31); Framingham, Massachusetts, USA
- Genres: Latin, Latin Pop, Cumbia, Tropical
- Occupations: Singer, Songwriter, Performer
- Years active: 2006–present
- Website: www.selenaleeofficial.com

Selena Lee (born September 19, 1995) is an American singer/songwriter. She has been recognized by the Secretary of State of Rhode Island as an individual who has made exceptional contributions to the Honduran community.

Selena Lee began her musical career at the age of 11. She launched her solo career with the single "I Remember" in 2013. Her song had a positive acceptance in the US and became popular in Central America, with radio play in Honduras.

Her popularity in Latin America became larger when she was invited to sing the US national anthem at Fenway Park in Boston. Selena Lee was featured in different magazines across the United States including the Spanish online news outlet El Planeta of Boston. In Honduras, Lee was featured in El Heraldo, Diez, La Tribuna, and the national news paper La Prensa.

== Early life and career ==
Lee was born in Framingham, Massachusetts, to Orvin Robles and Army veteran Christine Canales. Her father was born in Honduras, and her mother is of Italian descent. Shortly after her birth, her family relocated to Cranston, Rhode Island, where Lee attended school. She graduated from Cranston High School East. After graduating, she obtained an athletic scholarship for soccer, but her athletic career came to an end after a field accident that left her with brain injuries. After months of recovery, Lee returned to the world of music at Fenway Park with her rendition of "The Star-Spangled Banner" for the Boston Red Sox vs. Oakland A's game on May 11, 2016. She has been working on releasing a new album.

== Discography ==
Selena Lee singles:

- I Remember (2013)
- Never Again (2013)
- Hard To Let Go (2014)
- Sonando Contigo (2014)
- Todo Termino (2014)
- Te Encontré (2016)
- Caderas (2016)

== Performances ==
Performances by Selena Lee:

- USA World Showcase (2007)
- Festival Centro America (2014)
- Rebane Catracho (2015)
- Festival Dominicano (2015)
- Fenway Park (2016)
- Carnaval Salvadoreno (2016)
- Festival Puerto Rico (2016)
