= Cleopatra Selene =

Cleopatra Selene may refer to:

- Cleopatra Selene of Syria, daughter of Ptolemy VIII Physcon and Cleopatra III of Egypt
- Cleopatra Selene II, also known as Cleopatra VIII, daughter of Cleopatra VII and Mark Antony. Client Queen of Mauretania.
