= Historia Naturalis Brasiliae =

First scientific book about Brazil

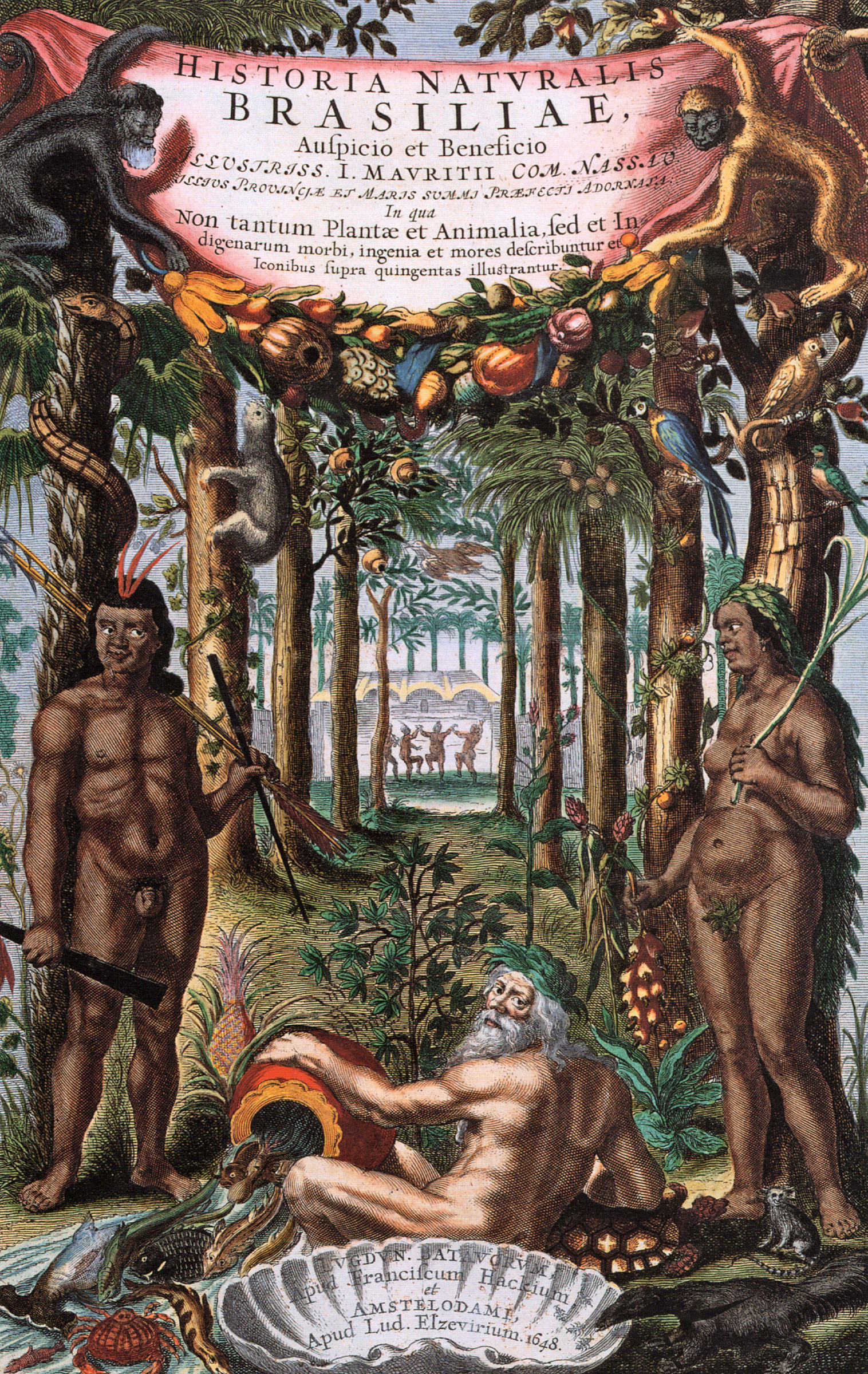
- Cover of the first edition
- Author: Willem Piso; Georg Marcgraf
- Language: Latin
- Genre: Scientific
- Publisher: Elzevir
- Publication date: 1648
- Publication place: Netherlands
- Media type: Print
- Pages: 293 pp

Historia Naturalis Brasiliae (English: Brazilian Natural History), originally written in Latin, is the first scientific work on the natural history of Brazil, written by Dutch naturalist Willem Piso and containing research done by the German scientist Georg Marcgraf, published in 1648. The work includes observations made by the German naturalist H. Gralitzio, in addition to humanist Johannes de Laet. It was dedicated to Johan Maurits, Count of Nassau, who was the patron of the project during the period of Dutch rule in Brazil.

The research of the work focuses on the coast of the Northeast, during its occupation by the Dutch West India Company. Marcgraf and Piso had started their field research of the area in 1637. The work covers tropical diseases and Indigenous therapies, but Piso depicts the Indigenous peoples of Brazil as barbarians who lack scientific education. Piso and his contemporaries thought that the Indigenous peoples would be unable to contribute to any studies on medicine and botany.

The book had wide circulation in Northern Europe, and was admired for the illustrations accompanying the text. The work remained unsurpassed until the 19th century. In Denmark, Ole Worm followed the book's organizational structure when documenting the natural history of Denmark. He reused some of the book's illustrations n his own work, Museum Wormianum. Carl Linnaeus and Albert Aublet also reused the work of Macgrave in several of their texts and images.

== The work ==
Historia Naturalis Brasiliae is a Latin-language scientific work on the natural history of Brazil, published in 1648 as a single volume of about 293 pages. It is regarded as the first scientific work to describe Brazil's natural environment. The work is also notable for its illustrations, with more than 500 images accompanying the text.

Written by the Dutch physician Willem Piso, it incorporates research by the German scientist Georg Marcgrave. It also includes observations by the German naturalist H. Gralitzio and contributions by the Dutch humanist Johannes de Laet.

The volume brings together observations of Brazilian plants and animals, studies of tropical diseases and their treatment, and accounts of Indigenous medical practices alongside European interpretations of those remedies. It also includes descriptions of the region and its inhabitants.

This research was carried out during Marcgrave and Piso's time in Brazil, beginning in 1637, and focused primarily on the coastal regions of northeastern Brazil under the control of the Dutch West India Company.

It was published in Leiden and Amsterdam. The title page gives the publication places as Lugdunum Batavorum (Leiden) and Amstelodamum (Amsterdam), and names the publishers as Franciscus Hackius and Ludovicus Elzevirius of the Elzevir publishing house. The volume measured approximately 40 cm (16 in) in height.

Modern scholarship has described the work as one of the most complete seventeenth-century accounts of Brazilian flora and fauna, noting its documentation of plant uses, vernacular names, and associated diseases, as well as its preservation of Indigenous and African knowledge within an early modern European scientific framework.

== Research focused on the coast of the Northeast Region ==
Though referring to Brazil generally throughout the text, the authors' research was of the coastal strip of the Northeast, occupied by the Dutch West India Company. It is based on Marcgraf and Piso's time in Brazil, starting in 1637. It offers an important early European insight into Brazilian flora and fauna by analyzing plants and animals, and studying tropical diseases and Indigenous therapies. Also included is William Piso's interpretation and first opinions of the Indigenous people who he would go on to describe as barbarous and lacking in science. This would lead to concern amongst Piso and his contemporaries that these people might not be able to contribute to studying medicine and botany.

== Impact ==
Historia Naturalis Brasiliae circulated widely in Northern Europe and beyond after its publication in 1648 and was noted for the quality and quantity of its illustrations. By the mid- to late seventeenth century, it had become an important reference for scholars, particularly those without direct access to Brazil. Its combination of detailed description and visual representation facilitated the study and comparison of tropical plants, animals, and diseases in Europe. The work remained unsurpassed until the nineteenth century.

The book also influenced the organization and practice of natural history. In the mid-seventeenth century, the Danish physician and antiquarian Ole Worm adopted a similar structure in his Museum Wormianum, a catalogue of his collection of natural and artificial curiosities, and reused some of its illustrations. Its combination of text and image, along with its systematic treatment of natural subjects, was taken up in subsequent works.

== Legacy ==
=== 20th-century herbariums ===
Relevancy was still found in the 20th century with a herbarium being discovered that would contain a hefty amount of items that were used in the Netherlands during the 17th century. The utility of these documents from John Maurice, Prince of Nassau-Siegen were able to assist other researchers and academics even in a more modern context. This discovery would also cause people to seek out a variety of these books detailing herbariums in order to achieve further information than those available to Maurice.

=== Influence on ecology and imitation by Ole Worm ===
This work would prove to be incredibly influential especially in the field of ecology, being used by a variety of different ecologists in different locations and time. The long lasting influence could be seen outside of just the field of ecology, as well, with various other forms of science utilizing the findings in various ways. In particular, Ole Worm utilized a similar organizational structure when documenting natural history of Denmark while even using some of the images in his work, Museum Wormianum. Carl Linnaeus and Albert Aublet would also use the work of Macgrave in several of their texts and images.

=== Reception and circulation ===
The Brazilian physician and researcher Juliano Moreira said of the work:

This clearly masterful work, when carefully reexamined, shows, at each perquisition, new excellences, and thus it is still one of the most authentic glories of Dutch medical literature. We owe to Pies a description, so accurate and meticulous, of the then reigning endemics in Brazil and the means of treating them. He observed the yaws, tetanus, various types of paralysis, dysentery, hemeralopia, maculopapular. He described Ipecac and emeto - cathartic qualities, which aboriginals used long before the famous doctor Adrian Helvetius, grandfather of the notable French philosopher Claudio Adriano Helvetius received from Louis XIV a thousand louis gold, titles and honors for having discovered exactly those same therapeutic virtues. The Treaty of Helvetius titled "Remède contre le cours du ventre.

Diverse writers referred to the text, including Miguel Venegas, author of Noticia de la California (1757), Anglo-American Protestant theologian Cotton Mather, who saw in the text evidence of divine planning; and amateur American naturalist Thomas Jefferson, who mentioned Marcgraf in his Notes on the State of Virginia.

Carl Linnaeus and Albert Aublet also reused the work of Macgrave in several of their texts and images.

== See also ==
- Dutch Brazil
- History of science
- Natural history
