= Willem Piso =

Dutch physician and naturalist (1611–1678)

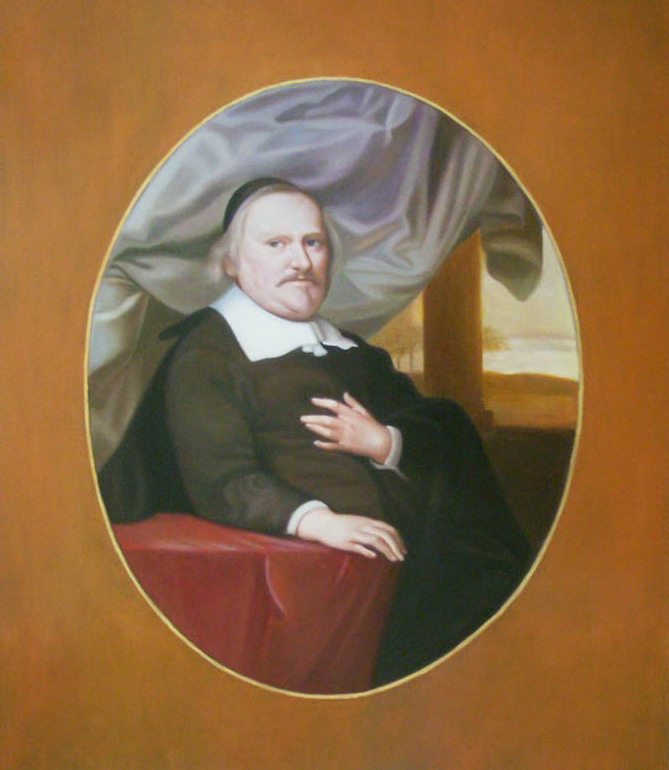
Willem Piso by Jan de Baen (1662)

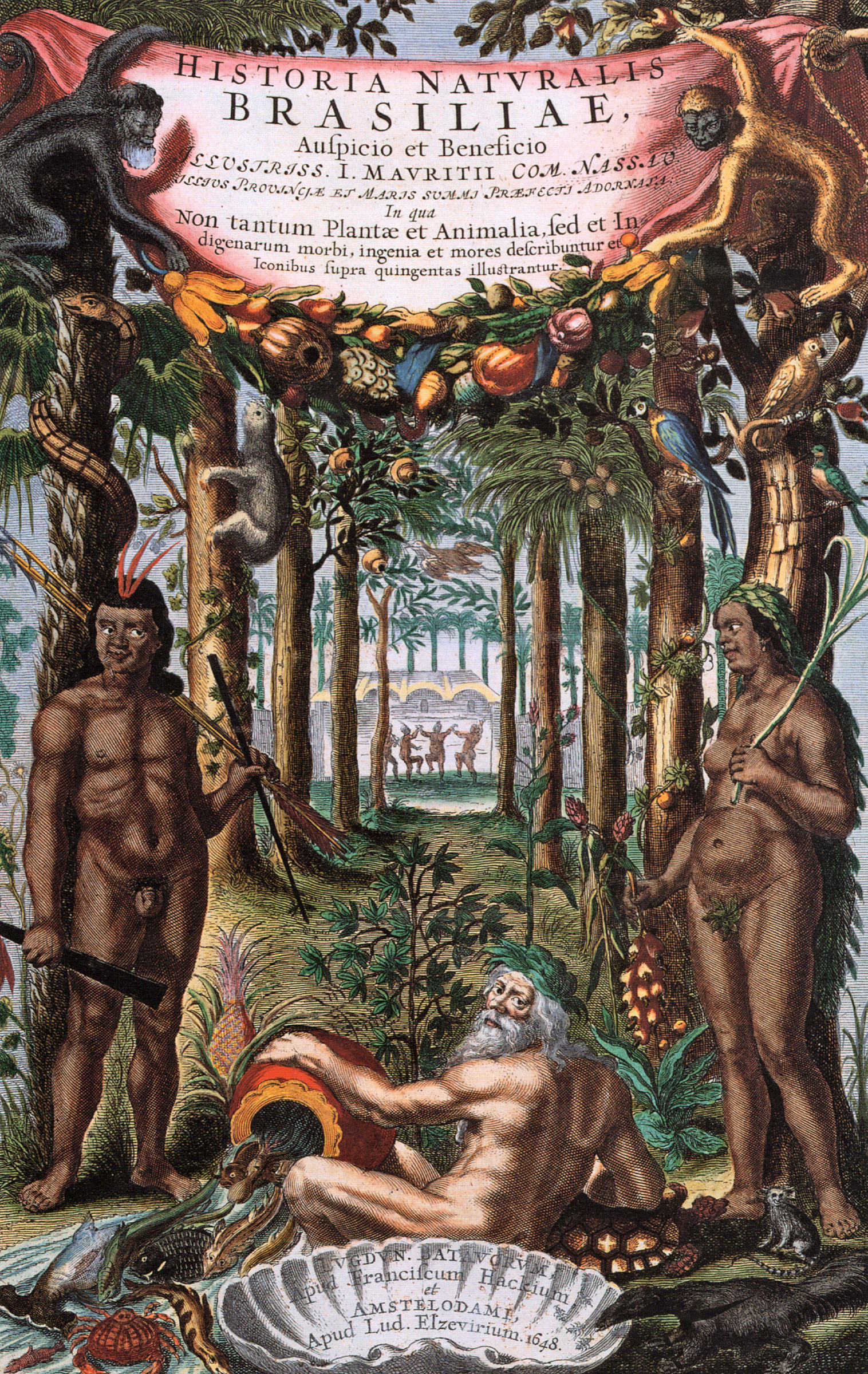
"Historia Naturalis Brasiliae" 1648

Willem Piso (1611 in Leiden – 28 November 1678 in Amsterdam) was a Dutch physician and naturalist who participated as an expedition doctor in Dutch Brazil from 1637 – 1644, sponsored by count Johan Maurits van Nassau-Siegen and the Dutch West India Company. Piso became one of the founders of tropical medicine.

== Early life and education ==
Willem Piso (born Willem Pies; c. 1611) was born in Leiden, in the Dutch Republic, to Cornelia van Liesvelt and the church organist Hermann Pies.

He is recorded under several name forms. In Dutch sources he appears as Willem Pies, while in Latin, he is identified as Gulielmus Piso; the genitive form Gulielmi Pisonis appears in titles and dedications. In Portuguese contexts, particularly in connection with his work in Brazil, he is referred to as Guilherme Piso. In botanical nomenclature, the standard author abbreviation "Piso" is used to identify him as the author of plant names.

Around the age of twelve, Piso began studying medicine at the University of Leiden. He later continued his education in France, earning his medical degree from the University of Caen on 4 July 1633, about ten years after he first enrolled.

== Career ==
Piso settled in Amsterdam as a physician. In 1637, he entered the service of the Dutch West India Company as a physician under Johan Maurits van Nassau-Siegen, governor of Dutch Brazil. He travelled to Brazil with a scientific and artistic team that included the naturalist Georg Marcgrave.

While in Brazil, Piso studied tropical diseases and the medicinal properties of local plants. He contributed observations on health and diet, noting the importance of fresh foods in preventing illness among European soldiers and seamen.

In 1644, Piso returned with Nassau-Siegen to the Dutch Republic. He later helped organize and publish the scientific results of the expedition, contributing to the Historia Naturalis Brasiliae (1648), one of the earliest European works describing the natural history of Brazil.

In 1655, he became inspector of the Amsterdam Medical College, and later its dean.

== Publications ==
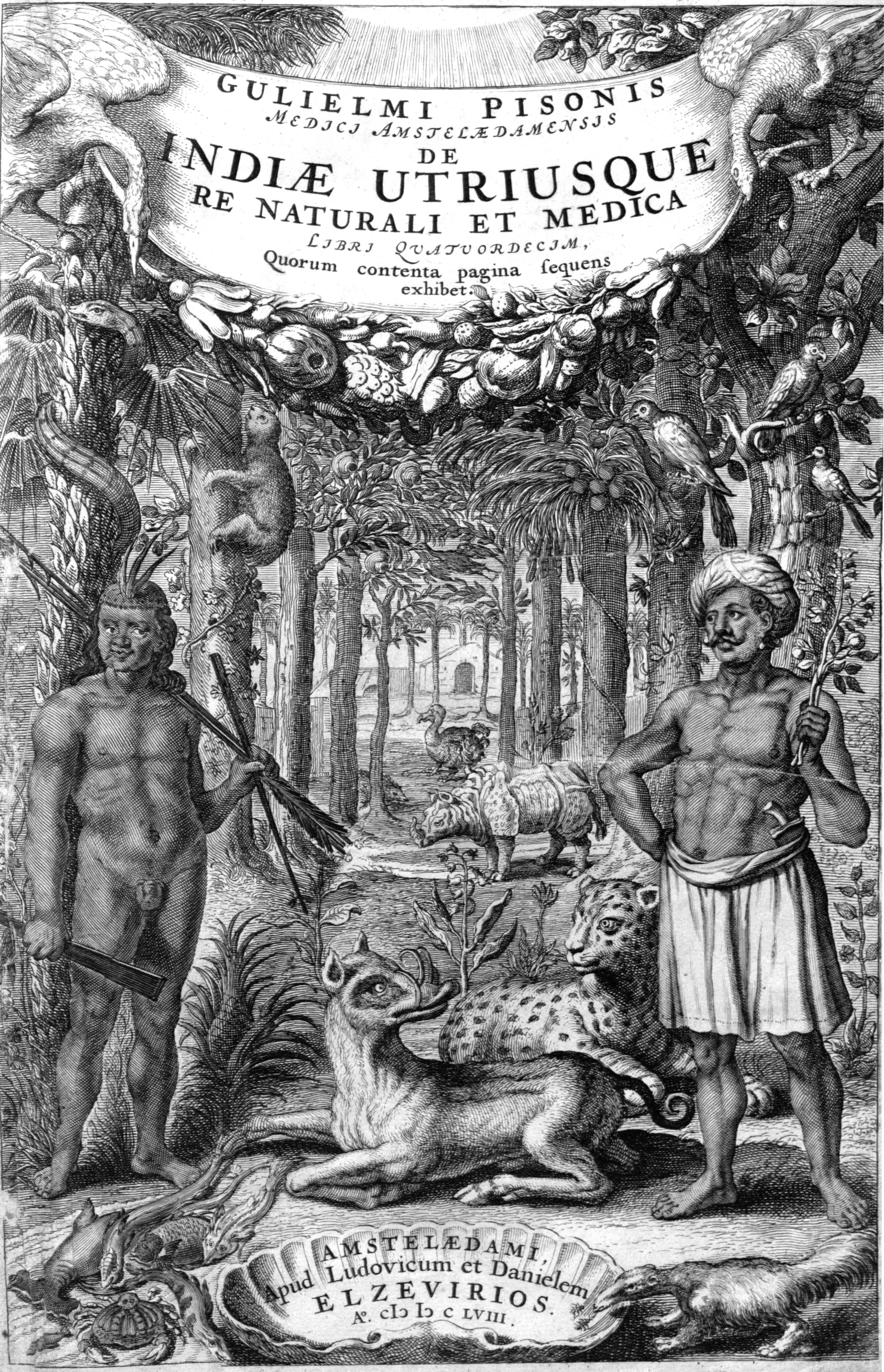
Title page of De Indiae utriusque re naturali et medica libri quatuordecim (1658)

Together with Georg Marcgrave, and originally published by Joannes de Laet, Piso wrote the Historia Naturalis Brasiliae (1648), an important early Western insight into Brazilian flora and fauna. He also published as part of this work four parts titled De medicina Brasiliense in which he examined tropical diseases and indigenous therapies (including the use of ipecacuanha-root and leaves of the jaborandi).

Piso collected plants and animals in Brazil. In 1658, he published another work, which is a second edition of the Historia titled De Indiae Utriusque re naturali et medica. He was the sole author of this and he is said to have tried to undermine Markgraf's work, and many careless errors, leading to criticism from Markgraf's brother and even Linnaeus.

== Death ==
Piso died on 28 November 1678 in Amsterdam, at about the age of 67.

== Legacy ==
Piso’s name is preserved in scientific nomenclature. The plant genera Pisonia and Pisoniella, both in the family Nyctaginaceae, are named in his honour.

His name is also commemorated in the mangrove tree crab, Aratus pisonii, and the minor planet 11240 Piso.
