= Georg Marcgrave =

German naturalist (1610–1644)

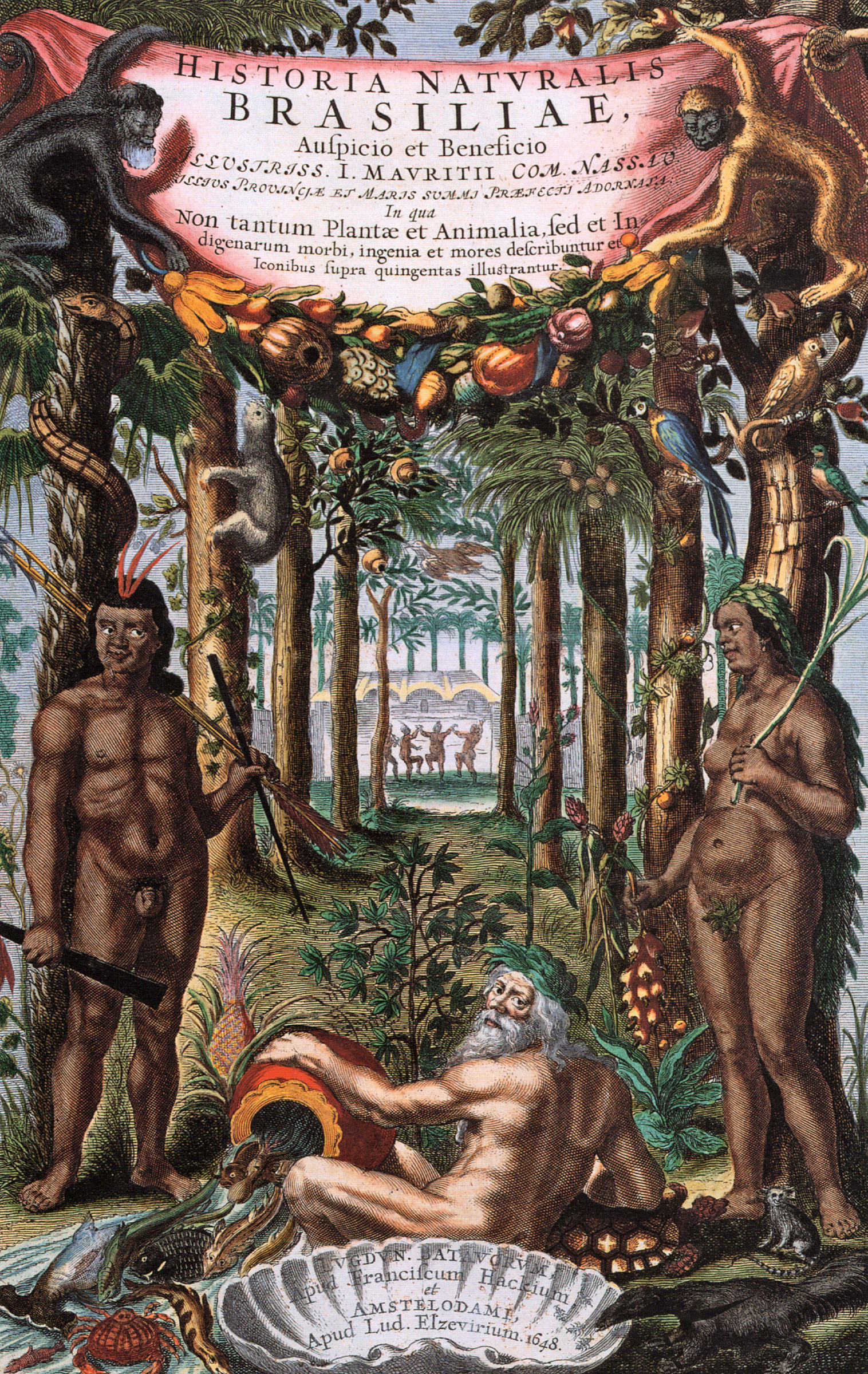
- Title page of the Historia, based in part on Marcgrave's observations
- Born: 20 September 1610; Liebstadt, Electorate of Saxony, Holy Roman Empire
- Died: August 1644 (aged 33); São Paulo de Loanda, Dutch Loango-Angola
- Occupations: Naturalist; astronomer; cartographer
- Known for: Research in Dutch Brazil; Contributions to Historia Naturalis Brasiliae (1648)

Georg Marcgrave (Note: Also spelled Marggraf, Marcgraf, and Markgraf. See Margrave.) (20 September 1610 – August 1644) was a German naturalist, astronomer, and cartographer. His research was included in the 1648 work Historia Naturalis Brasiliae by Dutch physician and naturalist Willem Piso, the first scientific treatment of the natural history of Brazil and a major contribution to early modern science.

== Early life ==
Georg Marcgrave was born on 20 September 1610 in Liebstadt, Electorate of Saxony. He received his early education in the German-speaking regions of the Holy Roman Empire before pursuing further study at universities in central Europe, including Leipzig University and the University of Basel, where he studied medicine, botany, mathematics, and astronomy.

His education followed the pattern of a peregrinatio academica (academic journey), moving between universities rather than completing a single course of study. During this period, he acquired practical skills in observation and scientific recording, including the use of astronomical instruments.

He later continued his studies in the Dutch Republic, where he was associated with Leiden University. There he received further instruction in botany, anatomy, and astronomy, including work with botanical collections and observational practice based on direct study of nature.

He does not appear to have completed a formal university degree. By 1637, he had completed this period of study and was prepared to join the Dutch expedition to Brazil.

== Career and works ==
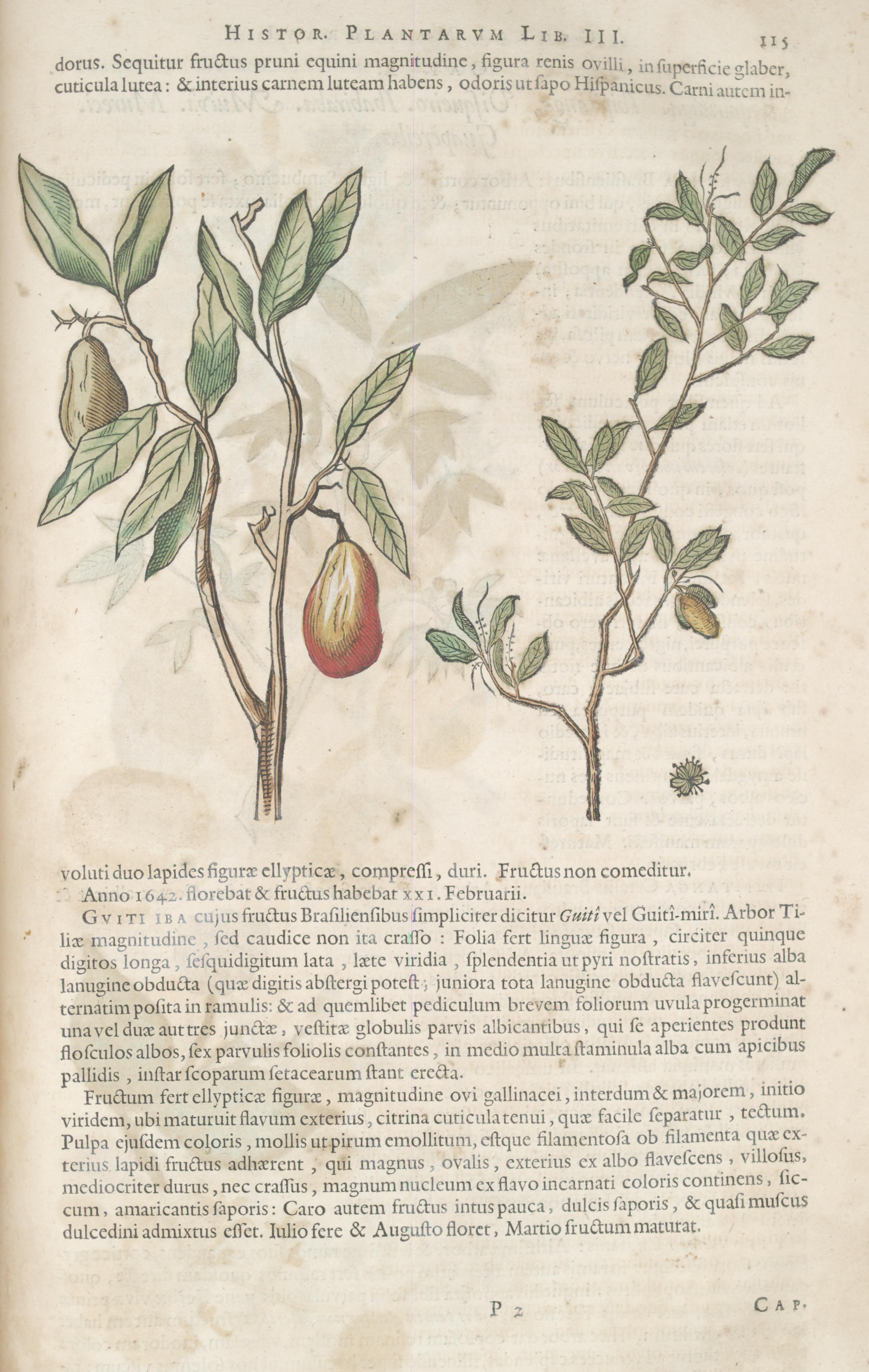
Botanical illustrations from the Historia (p. 115).

In 1637, Marcgrave was appointed astronomer to an expedition being organized to sail to Dutch Brazil. He was accompanied by physician Willem Piso. After arriving in the colony, he entered the service of its governor, Johan Maurits van Nassau-Siegen, whose patronage enabled him to explore several parts of Brazil.

Marcgrave arrived in Brazil in early 1638 and undertook zoological, botanical, and astronomical investigations. He travelled through different regions of the colony, studying its geography and natural history. During these journeys, he collected specimens and prepared drawings and descriptions of plants and animals that were largely unknown to European scholars.

Marcgrave also made geographic observations and produced maps of the region. His large map of Brazil, published in 1647, became an important contribution to 17th-century cartography.

His observations and illustrations later formed a substantial part of Historia Naturalis Brasiliae, published posthumously in 1648 and written in collaboration with Piso. The book became one of the earliest comprehensive studies of the natural history of Brazil and had lasting influence on the history of science.

According to Georges Cuvier, Marcgrave was among the most able and precise observers of the natural history of remote regions during the 16th and 17th centuries.

== Death and legacy ==
In 1643, Marcgrave left Brazil and travelled to Africa to conduct further research. He died in August 1644 at the Dutch settlement of São Paulo de Loanda (now Luanda, Angola), apparently after falling victim to the local climate and contracting a fever.

After his death, Marcgrave's scientific notes and drawings were brought back to Europe. They were later used by scholars, including Joannes de Laet, in preparing the publication of Historia Naturalis Brasiliae.
