= Selene (given name) =

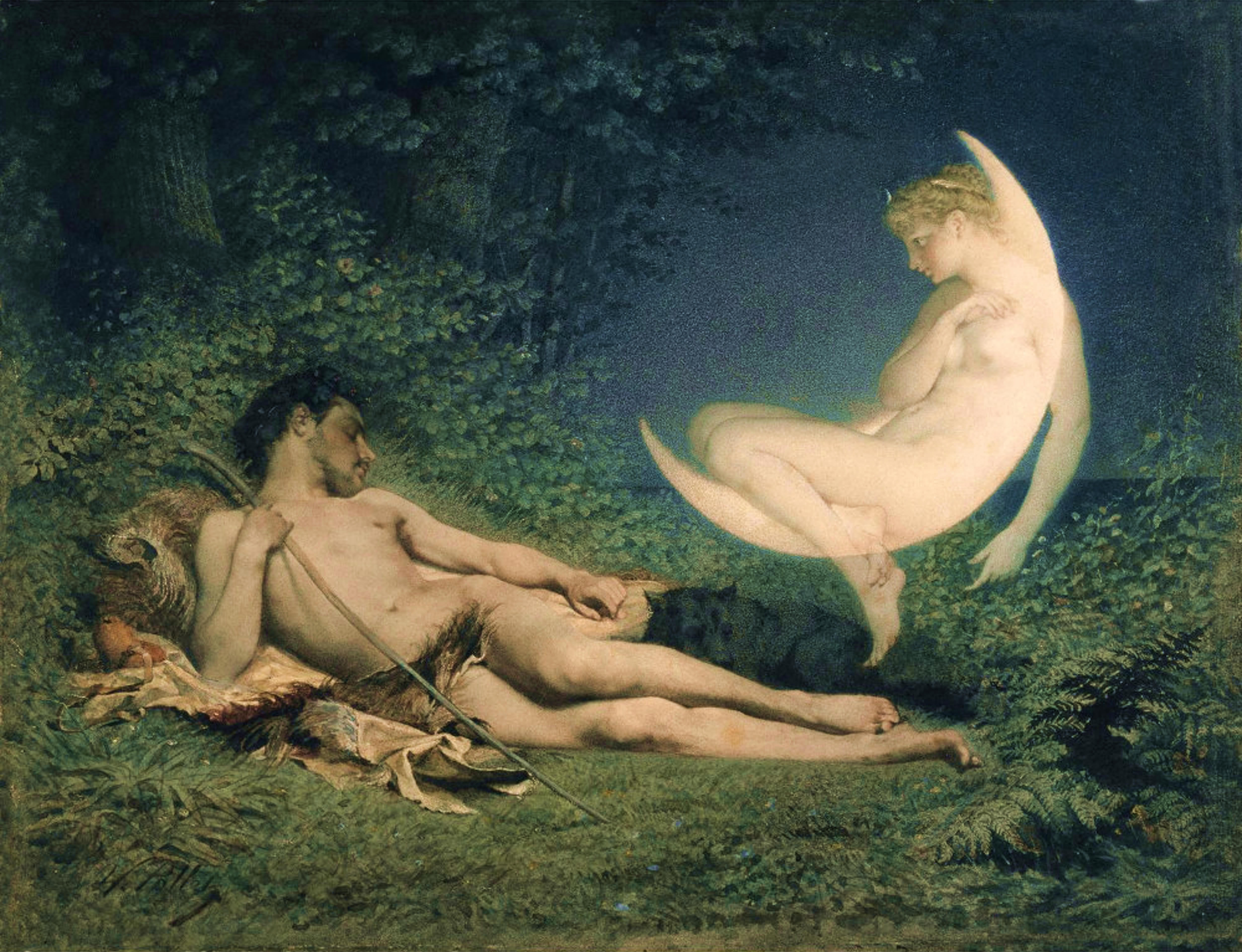
- Selene and Endymion by Victor Florence Pollett
- Pronunciation: [selɛ̌ːnɛː]
- Gender: Female
- Language: Greek
- Name day: April 2

Origin
- Meaning: Moon

Other names
- See also: Helen

Selene is a female given name taken from Selene (Greek Σελήνη, [selɛ̌ːnɛː], 'moon') in Greek mythology. Selene was an archaic lunar deity and the daughter of the Titans Hyperion and Theia. Her equivalent in ancient Roman religion and myth is Luna, Latin for "moon."

The etymology of Selene is uncertain, but if the word is of Greek origin, it is likely connected to the word selas (σέλας), meaning "brightness".

== List of people ==
Notable people with the name include:

- Selene Caramazza (born 1993), Italian actress
- Selene Delgado (born 1996), Venezuelan model and beauty pageant titleholder
- Selene Luna (born 1971), American actress, comedian, burlesque performer, and model
- Selene Vigil (born 1965), American singer and musician
- Cleopatra Selene (disambiguation), multiple people

== Fictional characters ==
- Selene Gallio, supervillain in Marvel Comics
