= Pandia (festival) =

Ancient festival in Athens

The Pandia was an ancient state festival attested as having been held annually at Athens as early as the time of Demosthenes. Although little that is known of the Pandia is certain, it was probably a festival for Zeus, and was celebrated in the spring after the City Dionysia in the middle of the month of Elaphebolion (late March and early April).

== Dates ==
The exact date of the Pandia has been much discussed. Demosthenes speech Against Midias (21.8) has a meeting, during which the conduct of the City Dionysia was reviewed, being held after the Pandia. This places the Pandia, at least during the time of Demosthenes, after the City Dionysia. Some have seen an association between the Pandia and the full moon, putting the celebration on 14 Elaphebolion. However, according to Pickard-Cambridge, Gould, and Lewis, the association with the full moon "can neither be affirmed nor rejected", and modern scholarship appears to favor the later dates of the 16 or 17 Elaphebolion.

== Rites ==
The derivation of the festival's name and exactly whom the festival may have honored have been the subject of considerable discussion. Zeus, the goddess Selene, Pandia, a daughter of Zeus and Selene, and Pandion, a mythical king, have all been seen as being possibly connected with the festival.

The name "Pandia" is associated with the goddess Selene, the Greek personification of the moon. Originally, Pandia may have been an epithet of Selene, but by at least the time of the Homeric Hymn to Selene, Pandia ("all brightness") had become a daughter of Selene and Zeus. Pandia Selene or Selene's daughter Pandia, have been offered as possible origins for the name of the festival.

Another mythological figure whose name has been suggested as a possible source for the name of the festival is Pandion, a legendary king of Athens who, as part of the tribal reforms of Cleisthenes at the end of the sixth century BC, became the eponymous hero of the Athenian tribe Pandionis. However, some scholars think it is more likely that the hero derived his name from the festival as its legendary founder. An inscription dating from c. 386 BC, which refers to a decree of the tribe Pandionis, commending a "priest of Pandion" for services performed at the Pandia, supports the notion of a link between Pandion and the festival.

While mentioning both Selene and Pandion in connection with the festival's name, Photius states that the festival was held for Zeus. Although, according to Robert Parker, this association with Zeus may only be "a probably correct etymological guess", many scholars are content to assign the festival to Zeus. It is also possible that more than one mythological figure was associated with the festival, and who the festival honored may have changed over time.

== Pandia of Plotheia ==
A festival of the same name is attested for the deme Plotheia; what relationship, if any, this festival may have had with the Pandia of Athens is unknown.

== See also ==
- Athenian festivals
