= Cynthus =

Mountain on Delos island, Greece

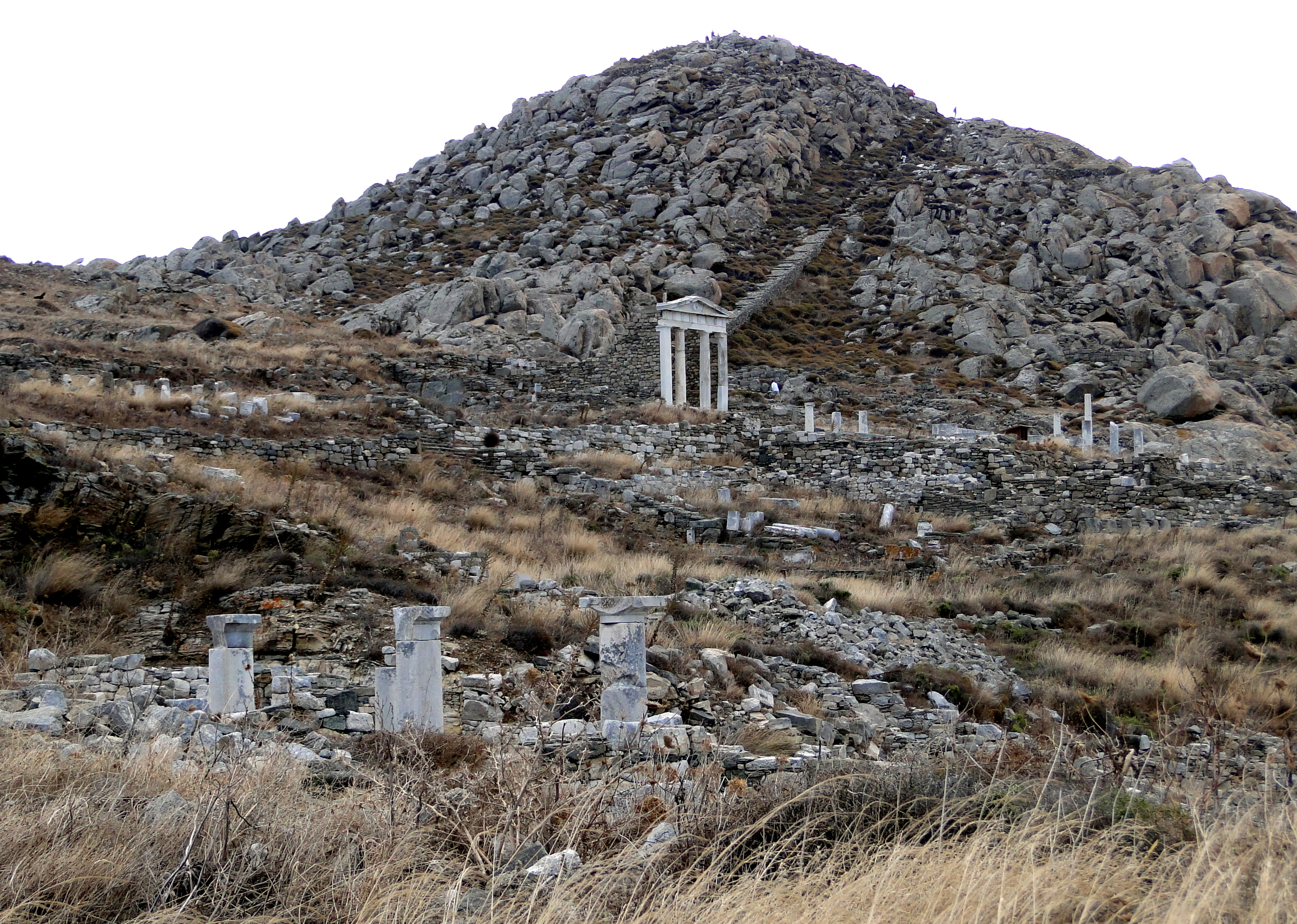
- View of Mount Cynthus

Highest point
- Elevation: 113 m (371 ft)
- Prominence: 113 m (371 ft)
- Coordinates: 37°23′43″N 25°16′21″E

Naming
- Native name: Κύνθος (Kýnthos)

Geography
- Location within Greece
- Location: Location of Mount Cynthus in Greece

Mount Cynthus (Greek: Κύνθος, romanized: Kýnthos) is located on the isle of Delos, part of the Greek Cyclades.

== Mythology ==
In Greek mythology, Leto gave birth to Apollo and Artemis on this island, having been shunned by Zeus' wife Hera who was extremely jealous of his liaison with Leto. They respectively carry the epithets of Cynthius and Cynthia—the latter eventually becoming a female given name, still current in English-speaking and other Western countries. The byname "Cynthia" was also applied to Selene, the moon goddess, due to her close association with Artemis, as well as the goddess Diana, Artemis's Roman counterpart.

== Description ==
Mount Cynthus is a bare granite rock rising at 113 metres (371 ft) high. It was probably the acropolis of the ancient town, and seems to have been surrounded by a wall. On its sides are many architectural fragments of white marble, and on its summit are the foundations and remains of a large building of the Ionic order. In antiquity two flights of steps led up to the summit of the mountain; the one on the northern, and the other on the western side. On the western side is an ancient gate, of which "the roof is formed of two stones rudely shaped, and resting against each other at an angle so obtuse that the rise is only 4.16 feet (1.27 m), above a breadth of 16.16 feet (4.93 m)".

The theatre stood at the western foot of Mount Cynthus, facing Rheneia, and not far from the stoa of Philip. Its extremities were supported by walls of white marble of the finest masonry, but of a singular form, having had two projections adjacent to the orchestra, by which means the lower seats were in this part prolonged beyond the semicircle, and thus afforded additional accommodation to spectators in the situation most desirable. The diameter, including only the projections, is 187 feet (57 m). The marble seats have all been carried away, but many of the stones which formed their substruction remain.

Immediately below the theatre, on the shore, are the ruins of a stoa, the columns of which were of granite. In a small valley which leads to the summit of Mount Cynthus, leaving the theatre on the left, many ruins of ancient houses are observable; and above them, in a level at the foot of the peak, there is a wall of white marble, which appears to have been the cell of a temple. Here lies an altar, which is inscribed with a dedication to Isis by one of her priests, Ctesippus, son of Ctesippus of Chius. Like many others, remaining both in this island and in Rheneia, it is adorned with bulls' heads and festoons. Another fragment of an inscription mentions Sarapis; and as both these were nearly in the same place where Spon and Wheler found another in which Isis, Anubis, Harpocrates, and the Dioscuri were all named, it is very probable that the remains of white marble belonged to a temple of Isis. Among them is a portion of a large shaft pierced through the middle, 4.16 feet (1.27 m) in diameter; and there is another of the same kind, 5.66 feet (1.73 m) in diameter, half-way up the peak of Cynthus.

As the nominal centre of the Cyclades archipelago, Mount Cynthus offers superb views of the innermost islands: Mykonos, Naxos, Paros, Syros, and Rheneia.

In modern times, this island is a major archaeological site and a tourist spot.
