= Selene =

Ancient Greek goddess of the Moon

- Goddess and personification of the Moon
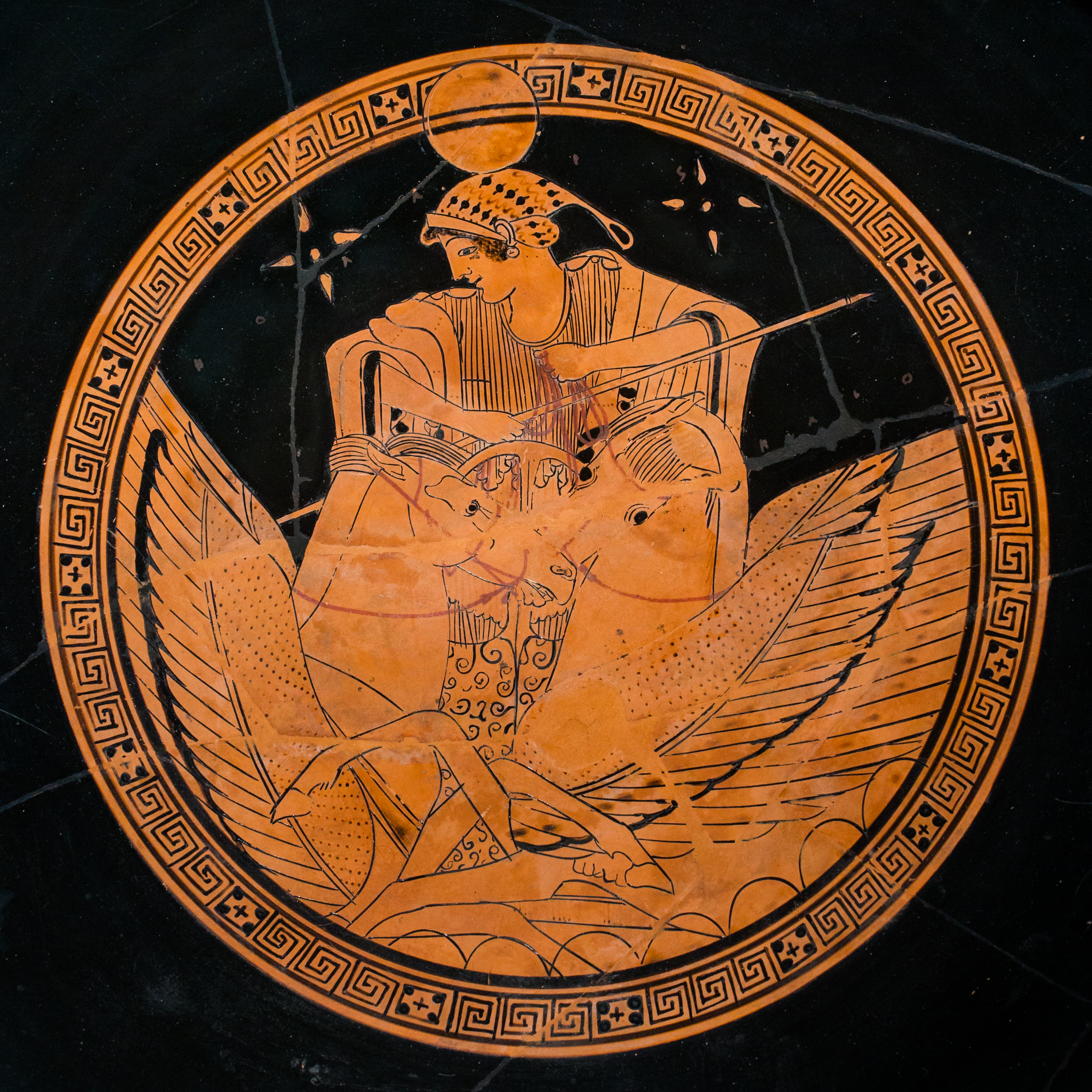
- Earliest known depiction of Selene in a chariot. It is said that the work portrays the Moon's ascension as the Giants are beaten in the Gigantomachy. Attic red-figure kylix, c. 490–480 BC, by the Brygos Painter.
- Other names: Mene (Μήνη)
- Greek: Σελήνη
- Abode: Sky
- Planet: Moon
- Animals: Horse, bull, mule
- Symbol: Crescent, chariot, torch, billowing cloak, bull, moon

Genealogy
- Parents: Hyperion and Theia
- Siblings: Helios and Eos
- Consort: Endymion, Zeus

Equivalents
- Roman: Luna
- Phrygian: Men

In ancient Greek mythology and religion, Selene (/sɪˈliːniː/; Ancient Greek: Σελήνη pronounced [selɛ̌ːnɛː] seh-LEH-neh) is the goddess and personification of the Moon. Also known as Mene (/ˈmiːniː/; Ancient Greek: μήνη pronounced [mɛ̌ː.nɛː] MEH-neh), she is traditionally the daughter of the Titans Hyperion and Theia, and sister of the sun god Helios and the dawn goddess Eos. She drives her moon chariot across the heavens. Several lovers are attributed to her in various myths, including Zeus, Pan, her brother Helios, and the mortal Endymion. In post-classical times, Selene was often identified with Artemis, much as her brother, Helios, was identified with Apollo. Selene and Artemis were also associated with Hecate and all three were regarded as moon and lunar goddesses, but only Selene was regarded as the personification of the Moon itself.

Her equivalent in Roman religion and mythology is the goddess Luna.

== Etymology and origins ==
=== Names ===
The name "Selene" is derived from the Greek noun selas (σέλας), meaning "light, brightness, gleam". In the Doric and Aeolic dialects, her name was also spelled Σελάνα (Selána) and Σελάννα (Selánna) respectively.

Selene was also called Mene. The Greek word mene, meant the moon, and the lunar month. The masculine form of mene (men) was also the name of the Phrygian moon-god Men. Mene and Men both derive from Proto-Hellenic *méns ("month"), itself from Proto-Indo-European *mḗh₁n̥s (meaning moon, the lunar month), which probably comes from the root *meh₁- ("to measure"), and is cognate with the English words "Moon" and "month". The Greek Stoic philosopher Chrysippus interpreted Selene and Men as, respectively, the female and male aspects of the same god.

Although no clear attestation for Selene herself has been discovered, in Mycenaean Greek the word for month 'men' has been found in Linear B spelled as 𐀕𐀜 (me-no, from genitive form μηνός, mēnós).

Just as Helios, from his identification with Apollo, is called Phoebus ("bright"), Selene, from her identification with Artemis, is also called Phoebe (feminine form). Also from Artemis, Selene was sometimes called "Cynthia", meaning "she of Mount Cynthus" (the birthplace of Artemis).

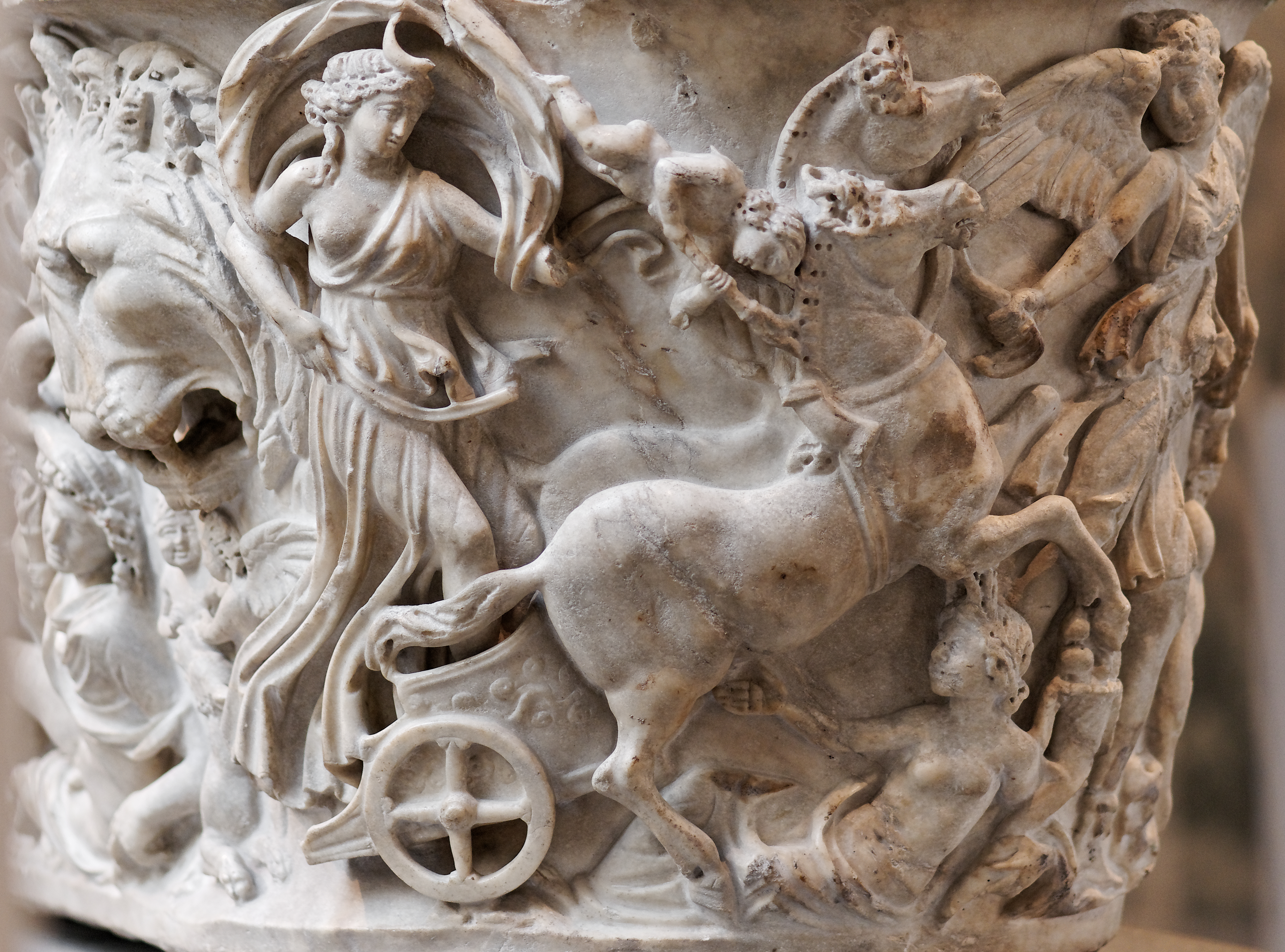
Detail of a sarcophagus depicting Endymion and Selene, shown with her characteristic attributes of lunate crown, billowing veil (velificatio) and heavenly chariot, from 3rd century AD, Roman Empire period.

=== Origin ===
Selene, along with her brother, her sister and the sky-god Zeus, is one of the few Greek deities of a clear Proto-Indo-European origin, although they were sidelined by later non-PIE newcomers to the pantheon, as remaining on the sidelines became their primary function, to be the minor deities the major ones were juxtaposed to, thus helping keep the Greek religion Greek.

The original PIE moon deity has been reconstructed as *Meh₁not (from which 'Mene', Selene's byname, is derived), and it appears that it was a male god. The Greek offshoot of this deity however is female. The ancient Greek language had three grammatical genders (masculine, feminine and neuter), so when a god or a goddess personified an object or a concept, they inherited the gender of the corresponding noun; selene, the Greek noun for 'Moon', is a feminine one (whereas men is a masculine one), so the deity embodying it is also by necessity female. In PIE mythology, the Moon, which is a male figure, was seen as forming a pair—usually wedlock—with the Sun, which is a female figure, and which in Greek mythology is recognized in the male deity and Selene's brother Helios. It seems however that unlike the Dawn (Eos) and the Sun (Helios), the Moon had very little importance in PIE mythology.

Although attempts have been made to connect Selene to Helen of Troy due to the similarity of their names, in two early dedications to Helen from Laconia her name is spelled with a digamma (Ancient Greek: Ϝελένα, romanized: Weléna), ruling out any possible connection between them. 'Helen' is more likely related to 'Helios' instead, and it seems that the two figures stem from a common Proto-Indo-European ancestor, the Sun Maiden.

== Descriptions ==
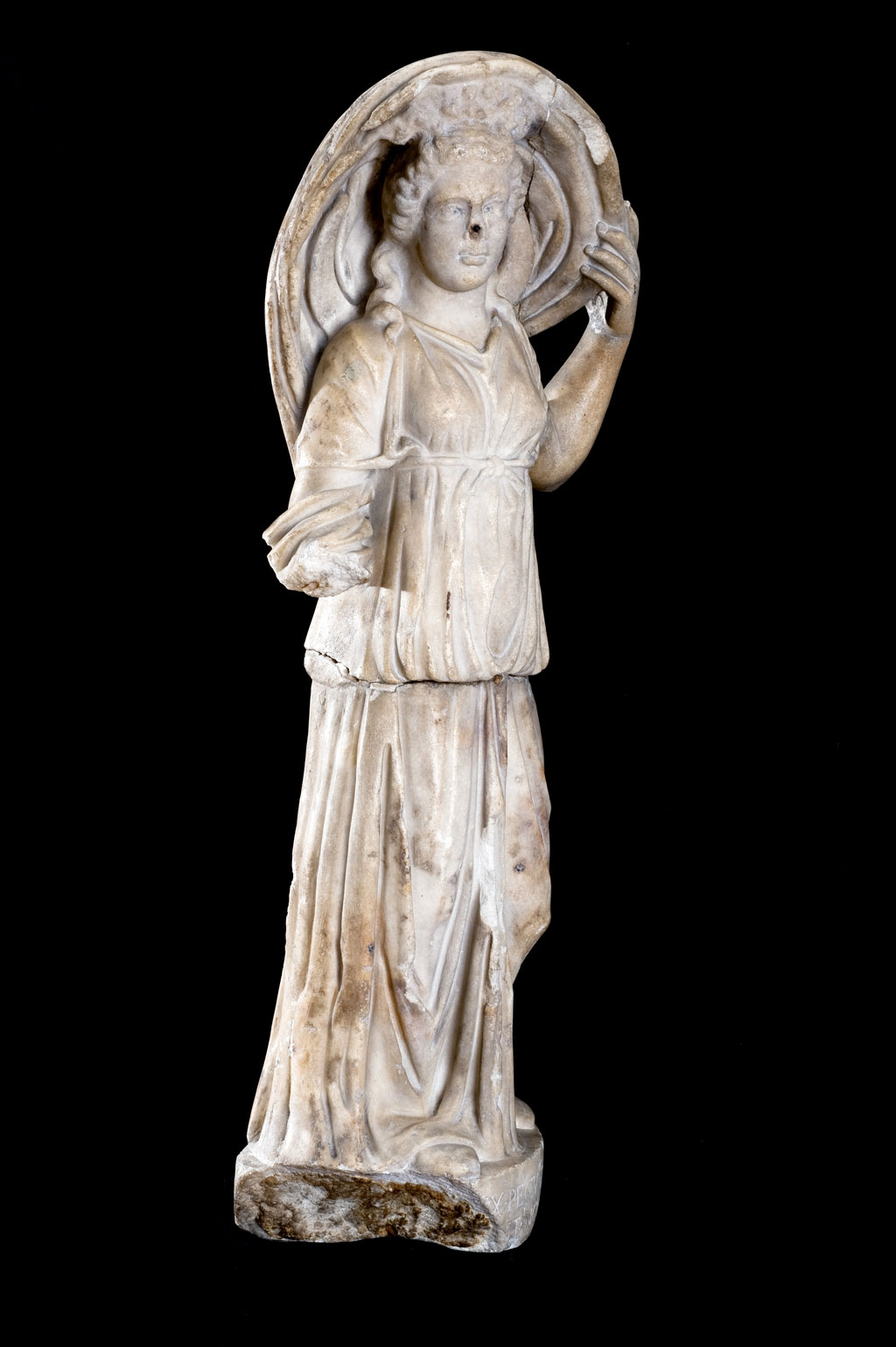
Statue of Selene in white marble, second half of the 3rd century AD

Surviving descriptions of Selene's physical appearance and character, apart from those which would apply to the Moon itself, are scant. There is no mention of Selene as a goddess in either the Iliad or the Odyssey of Homer, while her only mention in Hesiod's Theogony is as the daughter of Hyperion and Theia, and sister of Helios and Eos. She was, however, the subject of one of the thirty-three Homeric Hymns, which gives the following description:

And next, sweet voiced Muses, daughters of Zeus, well-skilled in song, tell of the long-winged Moon. From her immortal head a radiance is shown from heaven and embraces earth; and great is the beauty that ariseth from her shining light. The air, unlit before, glows with the light of her golden crown, and her rays beam clear, whensoever bright Selene having bathed her lovely body in the waters of Ocean, and donned her far-gleaming raiment, and yoked her strong-necked, shining team, drives on her long-maned horses at full speed, at eventime in the mid-month: then her great orbit is full and then her beams shine brightest as she increases. So she is a sure token and a sign to mortal men.

...

Hail, white-armed goddess, bright Selene, mild, bright-tressed queen!

Two other sources also mention her hair. The Homeric Hymn to Helios uses the same epithet εὐπλόκαμος ("bright-tressed"), used in the above Hymn to Selene (elsewhere translated as "rich-", "lovely-", or "well-tressed"), while Epimenides uses the epithet ἠυκόμοιο ("lovely-haired").

In late accounts, Selene (like the Moon itself) is often described as having horns. The Orphic Hymn to Selene addresses her as "O bull-horned Moon", and further describes her as "torch-bearing, ... feminine and masculine, ... lover of horses," and grantor of "fulfillment and favor". Empedocles, Euripides and Nonnus all describe her as γλαυκῶπις (glaukṓpis, "bright-eyed", a common epithet of the goddess Athena) while in a fragment from a poem, possibly written by Pamprepius, she is called κυανῶπις (kyanṓpis, "dark-eyed"). Mesomedes of Crete calls her γλαυκὰ (glaukà, "silvery grey").

== Family ==
=== Parents ===
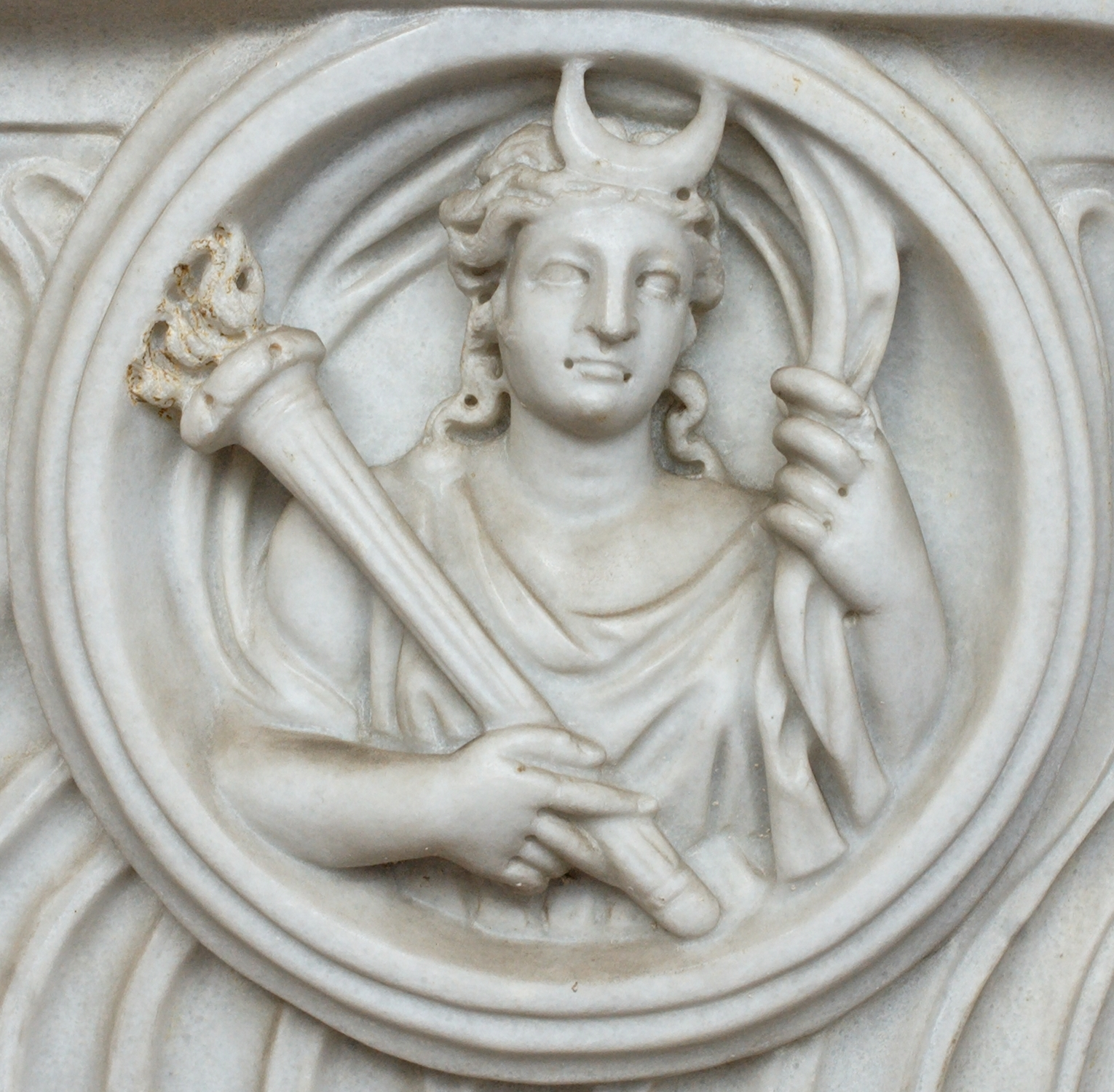
Detail of Selene from a Roman sarcophagus

The usual account of Selene's origin is given by Hesiod in his Theogony, where the sun-god Hyperion espoused his sister Theia, who gave birth to "great Helios and clear Selene and Eos who shines upon all that are on earth and upon the deathless Gods who live in the wide heaven". The Homeric Hymn to Helios follows this tradition: "Hyperion wedded glorious Euryphaëssa, his own sister, who bare him lovely children, rosy-armed Eos and rich-tressed Selene and tireless Helios", with Euryphaëssa ("widely shining") probably being an epithet of Theia. However, the Homeric Hymn to Hermes has Selene as the daughter of Pallas, the son of an otherwise unknown Megamedes. This Pallas is possibly identified with the Pallas, who, according to Hesiod's Theogony, was the son of the Titan Crius, and thus Selene's cousin. Other accounts give still other parents for Selene: Euripides has Selene as the daughter of Helios (rather than sister), while an Aeschylus fragment possibly has Selene as the daughter of Leto, as does a scholium on Euripides's play The Phoenician Women which adds Zeus as the father. Furthermore, in Virgil's Aeneid, when Nisus calls upon Selene/the Moon, he addresses her as "daughter of Latona."

=== Offspring ===
According to the Homeric Hymn to Selene, the goddess bore Zeus a daughter, Pandia ("All-brightness"), "exceeding lovely amongst the deathless gods". The 7th century BC Greek poet Alcman makes Ersa ("Dew") the daughter of Selene and Zeus. Selene and Zeus were also said to be the parents of Nemea, the eponymous nymph of Nemea, where Heracles slew the Nemean Lion, and where the Nemean Games were held.

From Pausanias we hear that Selene was supposed to have had fifty daughters, by her lover Endymion, often assumed to represent the fifty lunar months of the Olympiad. Nonnus has Selene and Endymion as the parents of the beautiful Narcissus, although in other accounts, including Ovid's Metamorphoses, Narcissus was the son of Cephissus and Liriope.

Quintus Smyrnaeus makes Selene, by Helios (not explicitly her brother or father in this source), the mother of the Horae, goddesses and personifications of the four seasons; Winter, Spring, Summer, and Autumn. Quintus describes them as the four handmaidens of Hera, but in most other accounts their number is three; Eirene ("peace"), Eunomia ("order"), and Dike ("justice"), and their parents are Zeus and Themis instead.

Lastly, Selene was said to be the mother of the legendary Greek poet Musaeus, with, according to Philochorus, the father being the legendary seer Eumolpus.

== Mythology ==
=== Goddess of the Moon ===
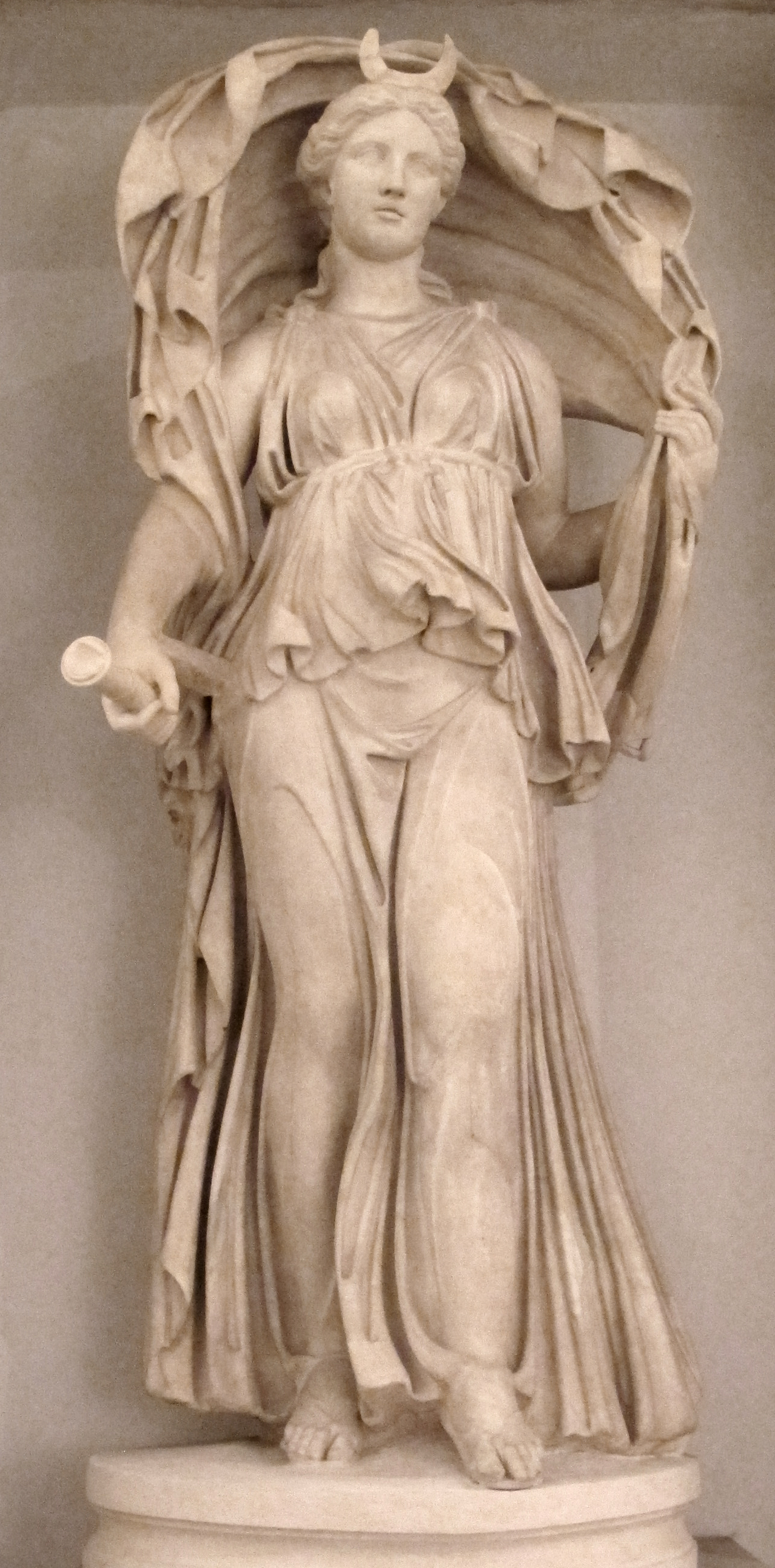
Statue of Selene, shown wearing the crescent on her forehead and holding a torch in her right hand, while her veil billows over her head.

Like her brother Helios, the Sun god, who drives his sun chariot across the sky each day, Selene is also said to drive a chariot across the heavens. There are no mentions of Selene's chariot in either Homer or Hesiod, but the Homeric Hymn to Selene gives the following description:

The air, unlit before, glows with the light of her golden crown, and her rays beam clear, whensoever bright Selene having bathed her lovely body in the waters of Ocean, and donned her far-gleaming raiment, and yoked her strong-necked, shining team, drives on her long-maned horses at full speed, at eventime in the mid-month: then her great orbit is full and then her beams shine brightest as she increases. So she is a sure token and a sign to mortal men.

The earliest known depiction of Selene driving a chariot adorns the inside of an early 5th century BC red-figure cup attributed to the Brygos Painter, showing Selene plunging her chariot, drawn by two winged horses, into the sea (Berlin Antikensammlung F 2293). The geographer Pausanias, reports seeing a relief of Selene driving a single horse, as it seemed to him, or as some said, a mule, on the pedestal of the Statue of Zeus at Olympia (c. 435 BC). While the sun chariot has four horses, Selene's usually has two, described as "snow-white" by Ovid. In some later accounts the chariot was drawn by oxen or bulls. Though the moon chariot is often described as being silver, for Pindar it was golden.

In antiquity, the lunar eclipse phenomena were thought to be caused by witches, particularly the ones from Thessaly, who brought the Moon/Selene down with spells and invocations of magic. References to this magical trick, variously referred to as καθαιρεῖν (kathaireĩn), are scattered throughout ancient literature, whereas eclipses of both the Sun and the Moon were called kathaireseis ("casting-downs") by the Greek populace. A famous example of that is Aglaonice of Thessaly, an ancient Greek astronomer, who was regarded as a sorceress for her (self-proclaimed) ability to make the Moon disappear from the sky (καθαιρεῖν τὴν σελήνην: kathaireĩn tén selénen). This claim has been taken–by Plutarch at first, and subsequently by modern astronomers–to mean that she could predict the time and general area where an eclipse of the Moon would occur. Those who brought down the Moon were thought to bring ill fortune upon themselves, as evidenced by the proverb ἐπὶ σαυτῷ τὴν σελήνην καθαιρεῖς ("you are bringing down the Moon on yourself") said for those who caused self-inflicted evils; some witches supposedly avoided this fate by sacrificing their children or their eyeballs.

In popular and common belief, Selene as the Moon came to be associated with physical growth, menstruation and sickness, the latter particularly in the context of demonic possession or even epilepsy. Owing to her role as the moon goddess, she was sometimes called Nyctimedusa (Ancient Greek: Νυκτιμέδουσα, romanized: Nuktimédousa), meaning "queen of the night".

=== Endymion ===
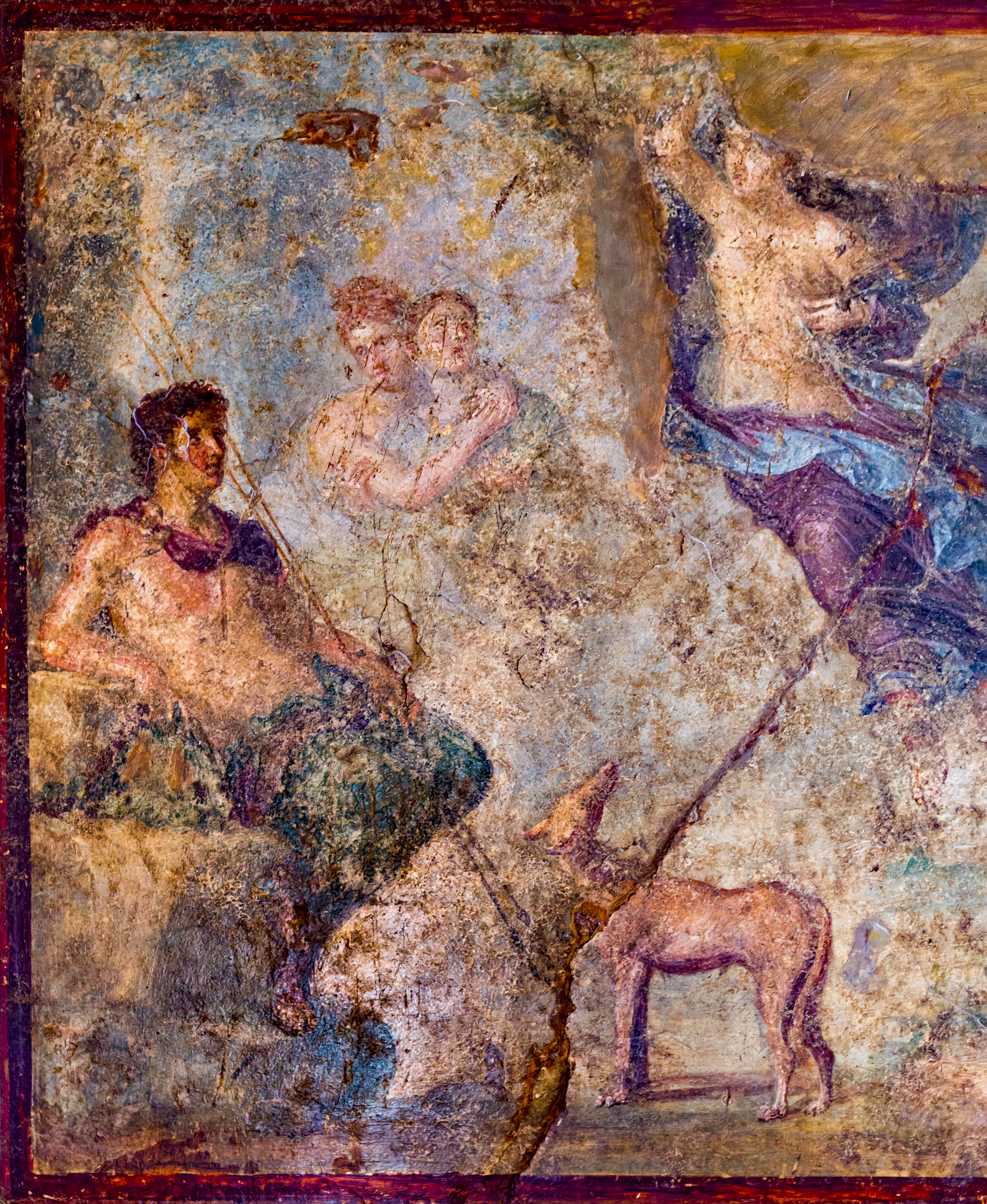
Endymion as hunter (with dog), sitting on rocks in a landscape, holding two spears, looking at Selene who descends to him. Antique fresco from Pompeii.

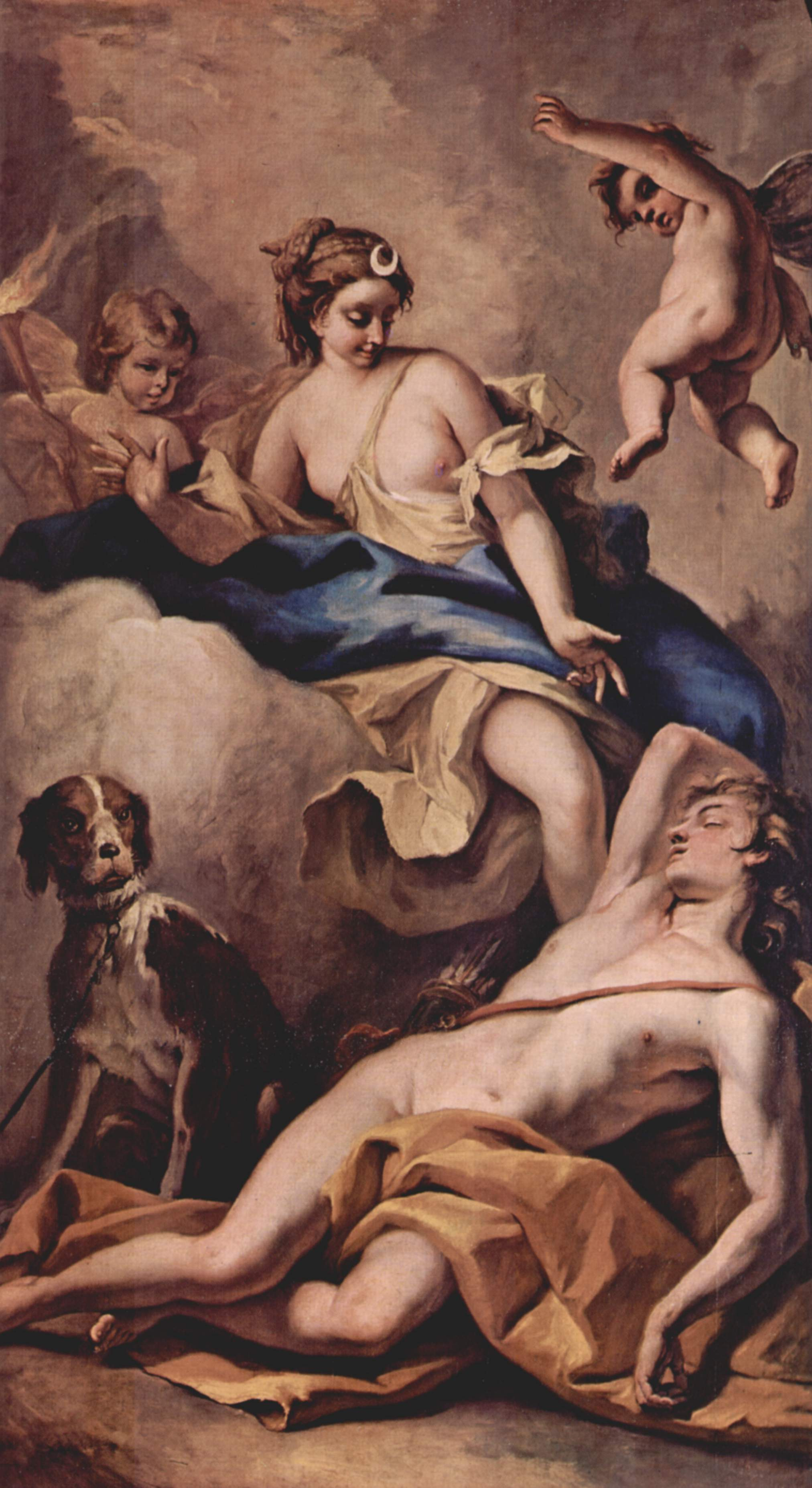
Selene and Endymion, by Sebastiano Ricci (1713), Chiswick House, England.

Selene is best known for her affair with the beautiful mortal Endymion. The late 7th-century – early 6th-century BC poet Sappho apparently mentioned Selene and Endymion. However, the first account of the story comes from the third-century BC Argonautica of Apollonius of Rhodes, which tells of Selene's "mad passion" and her visiting the "fair Endymion" in a cave on Mount Latmus:

And the Titanian goddess, the moon, rising from a far land, beheld her [Medea] as she fled distraught, and fiercely exulted over her, and thus spake to her own heart:

"Not I alone then stray to the Latmian cave, nor do I alone burn with love for fair Endymion; oft times with thoughts of love have I been driven away by thy crafty spells, in order that in the darkness of night thou mightest work thy sorcery at ease, even the deeds dear to thee. And now thou thyself too hast part in a like mad passion; and some god of affliction has given thee Jason to be thy grievous woe. Well, go on, and steel thy heart, wise though thou be, to take up thy burden of pain, fraught with many sighs."

The eternally sleeping Endymion was proverbial, but exactly how this eternal sleep came about and what role, if any, Selene may have had in it is unclear. According to the Catalogue of Women, Endymion was the son of Aethlius (a son of Zeus), and Zeus granted him the right to choose when he would die. A scholiast on Apollonius says that, according to Epimenides, Endymion fell in love with Hera, and Zeus punished him with eternal sleep. However, Apollodorus says that because of Endymion's "surpassing beauty, the Moon fell in love with him, and Zeus allowed him to choose what he would, and he chose to sleep for ever, remaining deathless and ageless". Theocritus portrays Endymion's sleep as enviable because (presumably) of Selene's love for him. Cicero seems to make Selene responsible for Endymion's sleep, so that "she might kiss him while sleeping". The Roman playwright Seneca, has Selene abandoned the night sky for Endymion's sake having entrusted her "shining" moon chariot to her brother Helios to drive. The Greek satirist Lucian's dialogue between Selene and the love goddess Aphrodite has the two goddesses commiserate about their love affairs with Endymion and Adonis, and suggests that Selene has fallen in love with Endymion while watching him sleep each night. In his dialogue between Aphrodite and Eros, Lucian also has Aphrodite admonish her son Eros for bringing Selene "down from the sky". While Quintus Smyrnaeus wrote that, while Endymion slept in his cave beside his cattle:

Divine Selene watched him from on high,

and slid from heaven to earth; for passionate love

drew down the immortal stainless Queen of Night."

Lucian also records an otherwise unattested myth where a pretty young girl called Muia becomes Selene's rival for Endymion's affections; the chatty maiden would endlessly talk to him while he slept, causing him to wake up. This irritated Endymion, and enraged Selene, who transforms the girl into a fly (Ancient Greek: μυῖα, romanized: muía). In memory of the beautiful Endymion, the fly still grudges all sleepers their rest and annoys them.

Philologist Max Müller's interpretation of solar mythology as it related to Selene and Endymion concluded that the myth was a narrativized version of linguistic terminology. Because the Greek endyein meant "to dive," the name Endymion ("Diver") at first simply described the process of the setting sun "diving" into the sea. In this case, the story of Selene embracing Endymion, or Moon embraces Diver, refers to the sun setting and the moon rising.

=== Gigantomachy ===
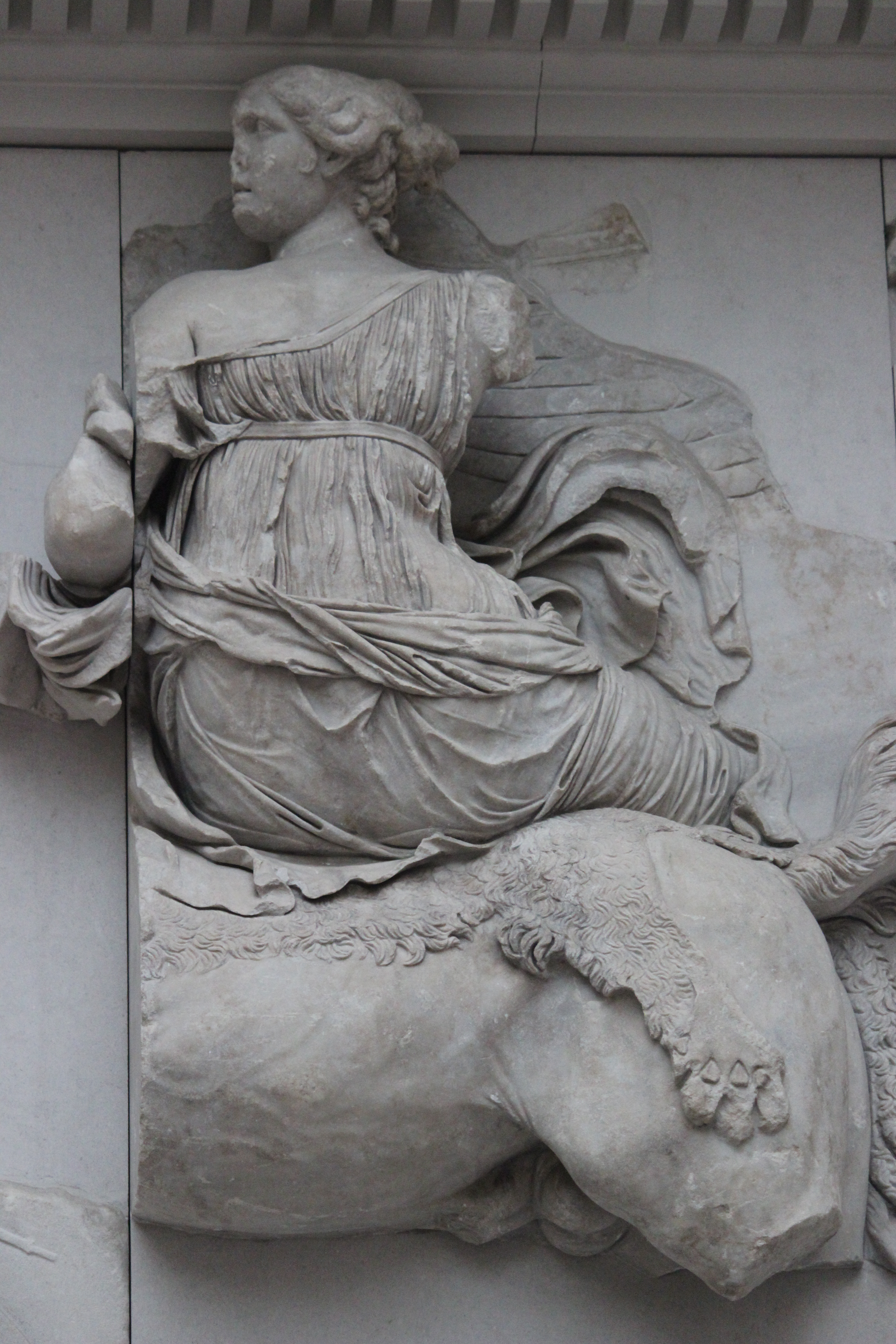
Selene riding horseback, detail of the Gigantomachy frieze, Pergamon Altar, Pergamon museum, Berlin, c. 180–159 BC.

Gaia, angered about her children the Titans being thrown into Tartarus following their defeat, brought forth the Giants, to attack the gods, in a war that was called the Gigantomachy. When Gaia heard of a prophecy that a mortal would help the gods to defeat the giants, she sought to find a herb that would make them undefeatable. Zeus heard of that, and ordered Selene as well as her siblings Helios (Sun) and Eos (Dawn) not to shine, and harvested all of that plant for himself. Selene's participation in the battle is evidenced by her inclusion in the Gigantomachy frieze of the Pergamon Altar, fighting against Giants next to her siblings Helios and Eos and her mother Theia in the southern frieze. Selene gallops sidesaddle in advance, and wears a woolen undergarment and a mantle. Additionally, on a rein guide for a chariot a goddess thought to be Selene with a crescent and veil over her head is depicted, who stands with Helios on a gate tower and tries to repel the attacks of snake-legged Giants.

=== Fight with Typhon ===
According to the late account of Nonnus, when the gigantic monster Typhon laid siege against the heavens, he attacked Selene as well by hurling bulls at her, though she managed to stay in her course, and rushed at her hissing like a viper. Selene fought back the giant, locking horns with Typhon; afterwards, she carried many scars on her orb, reminiscent of their battle.

=== Ampelus ===
Ampelus was a very beautiful satyr youth, loved by the god Dionysus. One day, in Nonnus' account, Ampelus rode on a bull, and proceeded to compare himself to Selene, saying that he was her equal, having horns and riding bulls just like her. The goddess took offense, and sent a gadfly to sting Ampelus' bull. The bull panicked, threw Ampelus and gored him to death.

=== Heracles ===
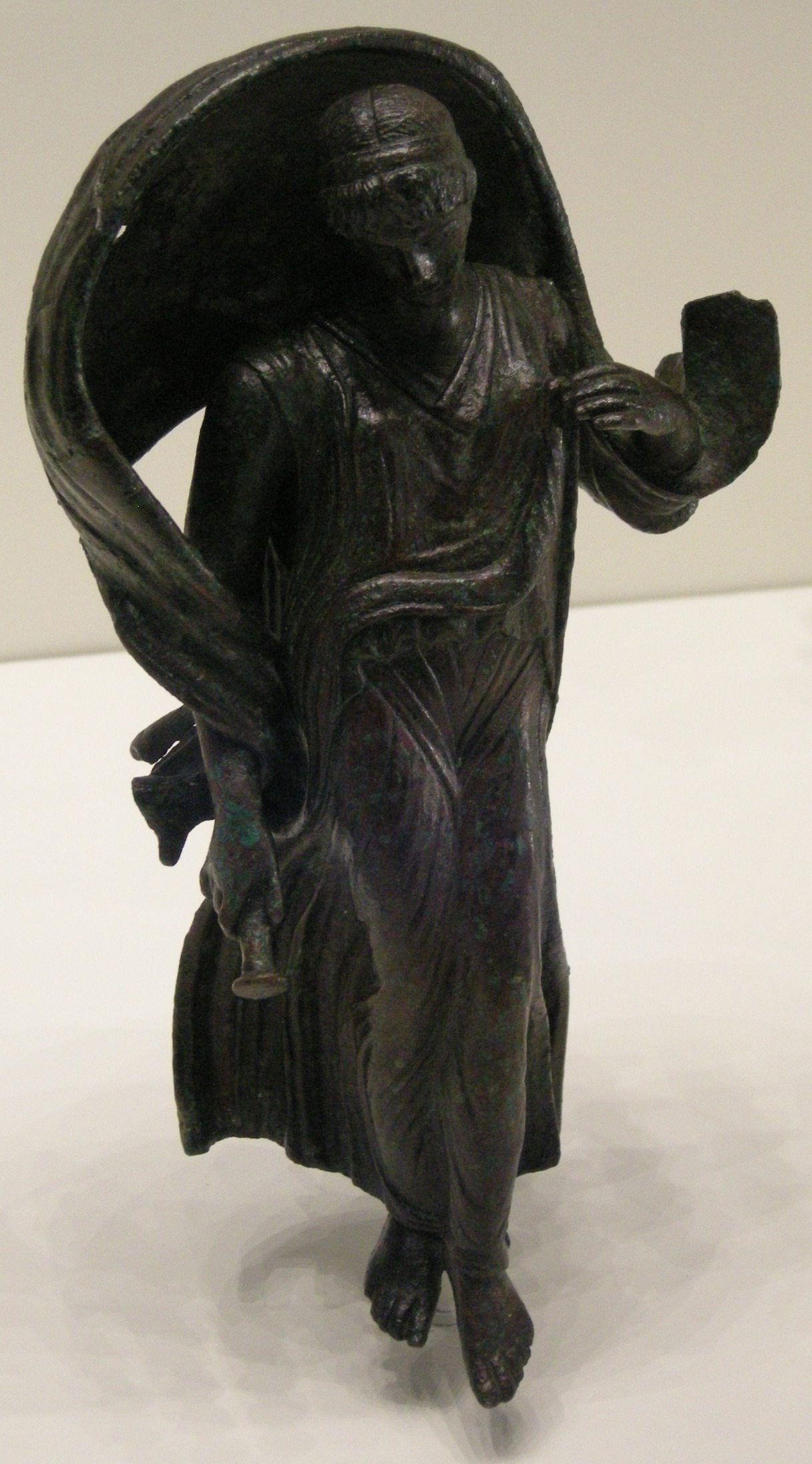
Roman-era bronze statuette of Selene velificans or Nyx (Night) (Getty Villa).

When Zeus desired to sleep with the mortal queen Alcmene and sire Heracles, he made the night last three days, and ordered Selene via Hermes to dawdle in the sky during that time.

Selene also played a small role in the first of Heracles' twelve labours; whereas for Hesiod, the Nemean Lion was born to Orthrus and the Chimera (or perhaps Echidna) and raised by Hera, other accounts have Selene involved in some way in its birth or rearing. Aelian states: "They say that the Lion of Nemea fell from the moon", and quotes Epimenides as saying:

For I am sprung from fair-tressed Selene the Moon, who in a fearful shudder shook off the savage lion in Nemea, and brought him forth at the bidding of Queen Hera.

Anaxagoras also reports that the Nemean lion was said to have fallen from the Moon. Pseudo-Plutarch's On Rivers has Hera collaborating with Selene, "employing magical incantations" to create the Nemean Lion from a chest filled with foam. Hyginus says that Selene had "nourished" the lion in a "two-mouthed cave".

=== Pan ===
According to Virgil, Selene also had a tryst with the god Pan, who seduced her with a "snowy bribe of wool". Scholia on Virgil add the story, ascribed to Nicander, that as part of the seduction, Pan wrapped himself in a sheepskin.

=== Other accounts ===
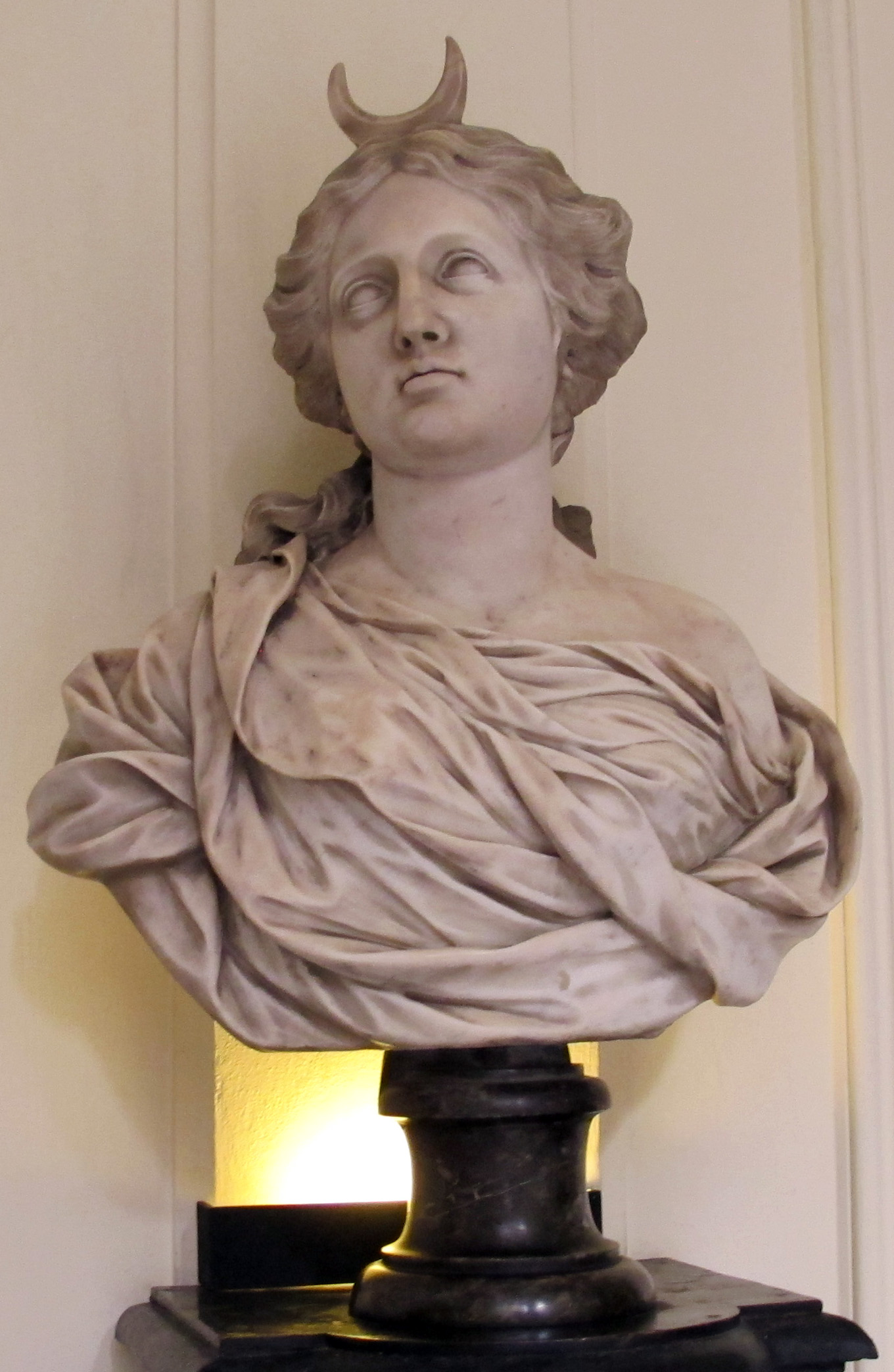
Bust of Selene, in the courtyard of Palazzo Gerini.

Diodorus Siculus recorded an unorthodox version of the myth, in which Basileia, who had succeeded her father Uranus to his royal throne, married her brother Hyperion, and had two children, a son Helios and a daughter Selene, "admired for both their beauty and their chastity". Because Basileia's other brothers envied these offspring, and feared that Hyperion would try to seize power for himself, they conspired against him. They put Hyperion to the sword, and drowned Helios in the river Eridanus. Selene herself, upon discovering this, took her own life. After these deaths, her brother appeared in a dream to their grieving mother and assured her that he and his sister would now transform into divine natures; and:

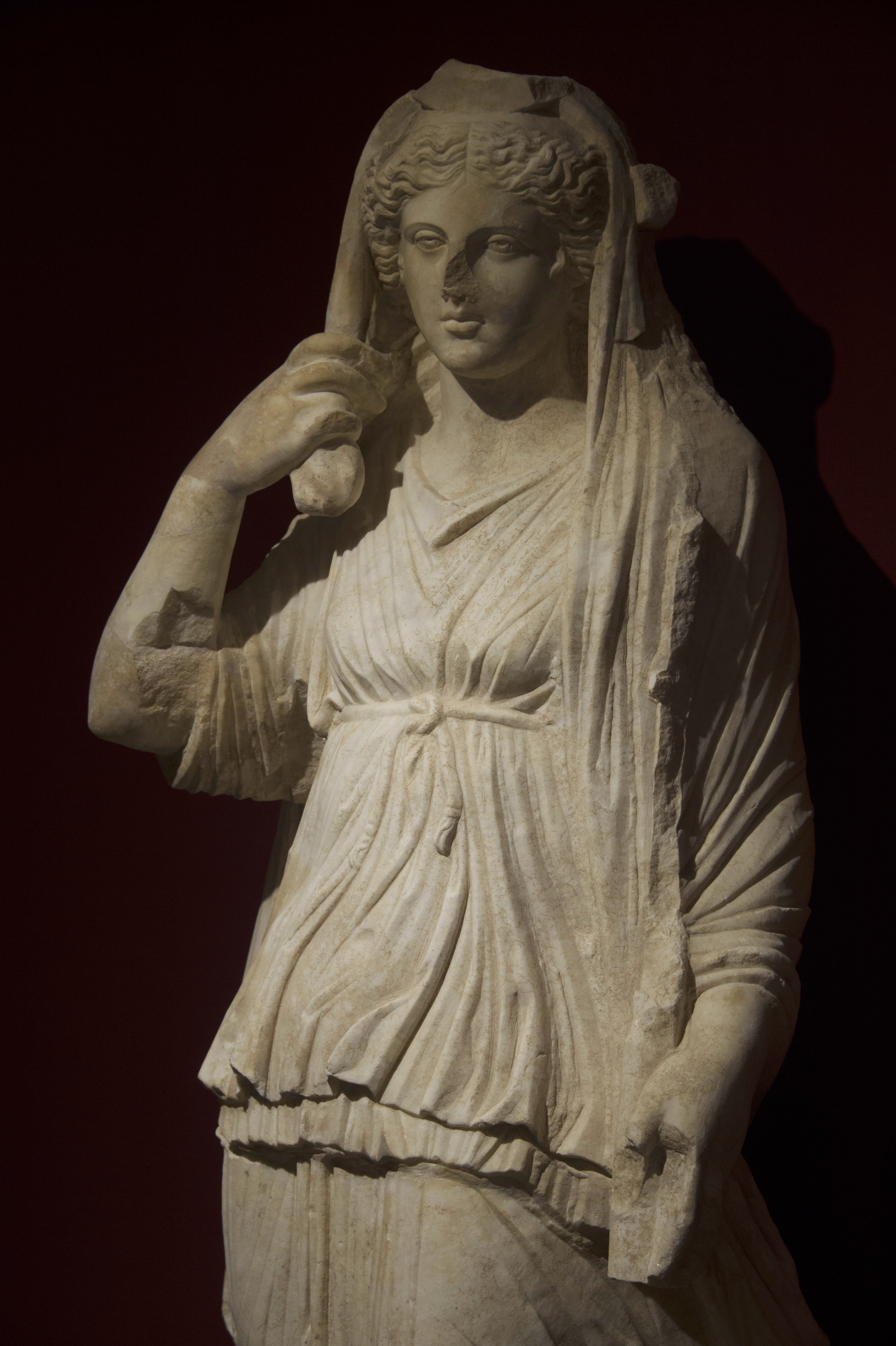
Roman statue of Selene, marble 2nd century AD, Museum of Antalya.

that which had formerly been called the "holy fire" in the heavens would be called by men Helius ("the sun") and that addressed as "menê" would be called Selenê ("the moon").

Plutarch recorded a fable-like story in which Selene asked her mother to weave her a garment to fit her measure, and her mother replied that she was unable to do so, as she kept changing shape and size, sometimes full, then crescent-shaped and others yet half her size.

In Lucian's Icaromenippus, Selene complains to the titular Menippus of all the outrageous claims philosophers are making about her, such as wondering why she is ever waxing or gibbous, whether she is populated or not, and stating that she is getting her stolen light from the Sun, causing strife and ill feelings between her and her brother. She asks Menippus to report her grievances to Zeus, with the request that Zeus wipes all these natural philosophers from the face of the earth. Zeus agrees, urged by Selene's complaints and having long intended to deal with the philosophers himself.

Claudian wrote that in her infancy, when her horns had not yet grown, Selene (along with Helios – their sister Eos is not mentioned with them) was nursed by her aunt, the water goddess Tethys.

According to pseudo-Plutarch, Lilaeus was an Indian shepherd who only worshipped Selene among the gods and performed her rituals and mysteries at night. The other gods, angered, sent him two lions to tear him apart. Selene then turned Lilaeus into a mountain, Mt. Lilaeon.

Ovid mentions how in the myth of Phaethon, Helios' son who drove his father's chariot for a day, when Phaethon lost control of the chariot and burned the earth, Selene in the sky looked down to see in amazement her brother's horses running wild lower than normal.

== Iconography ==
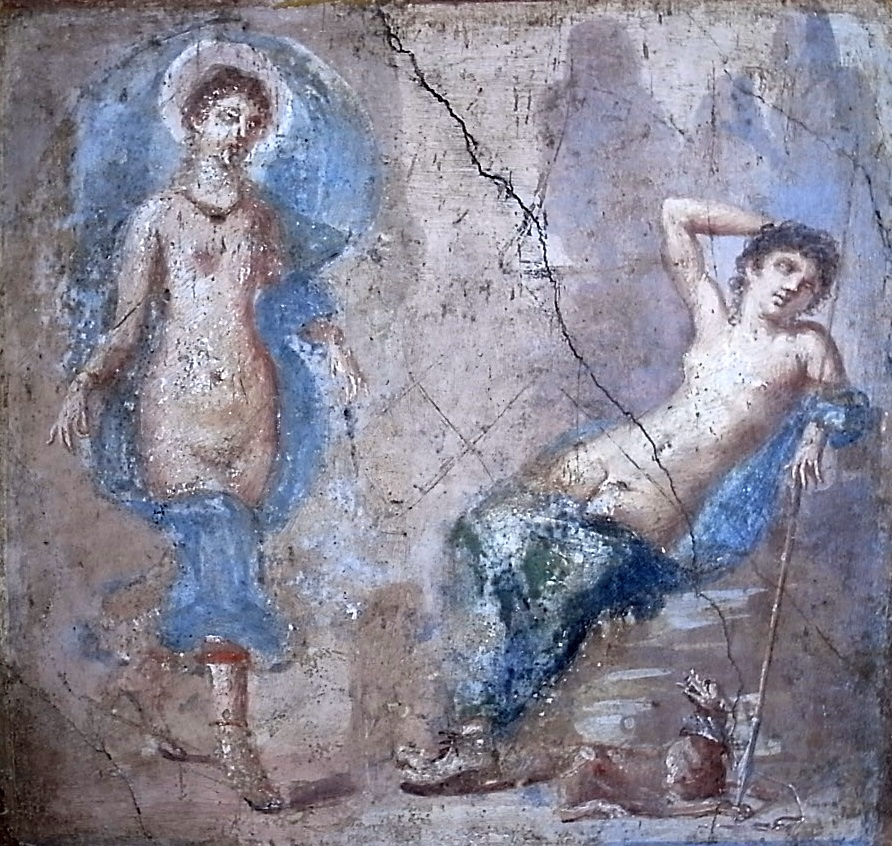
Selene and Endymion, antique fresco in Pompeii

In antiquity, artistic representations of Selene/Luna included sculptural reliefs, vase paintings, coins, and gems. In red-figure pottery before the early 5th century BC, she is depicted only as a bust, or in profile against a lunar disk. In later art, like other celestial divinities such as Helios, Eos, and Nyx (Night), Selene rides across the heavens. She is usually portrayed either driving a chariot (see above) or riding sideways on horseback (sometimes riding an ox, a mule or a ram).

Selene was often paired with her brother Helios. Selene (probably) and Helios adorned the east pediment of the Parthenon, where the two, each driving a four-horsed chariot, framed a scene depicting the birth of Athena, with Helios and his chariot rising from the ocean on the left, and Selene and her chariot descending into the sea on the right. Selene and Helios also appear on the North Metopes of the Parthenon, with Selene this time entering the sea on horseback. From Pausanias, we learn that Selene and Helios also framed the birth of Aphrodite on the base of the Statue of Zeus at Olympia. There are indications of a similar framing by Selene and Helios of the birth of Pandora on the base of the Athena Parthenos. Pausanias also reports seeing stone images of Helios, and Selene, in the market-place at Elea, with rays projecting from the head of Helios, and horns from the head of Selene. Selene also appears on horseback as part of the Gigantomachy frieze of the Pergamon Altar.

Selene is commonly depicted with a crescent moon, often accompanied by stars; sometimes, instead of a crescent, a lunar disc is used. Often a crescent moon rests on her brow, or the cusps of a crescent moon protrude, horn-like, from her head, or from behind her head or shoulders. Selene's head is sometimes surrounded by a nimbus, and from the Hellenistic period onwards, she is sometimes pictured with a torch.

In later second and third century AD Roman funerary art, the love of Selene for Endymion and his eternal sleep was a popular subject for artists. As frequently depicted on Roman sarcophagi, Selene, holding a billowing veil forming a crescent over her head, descends from her chariot to join her lover, who slumbers at her feet.

== Cult ==
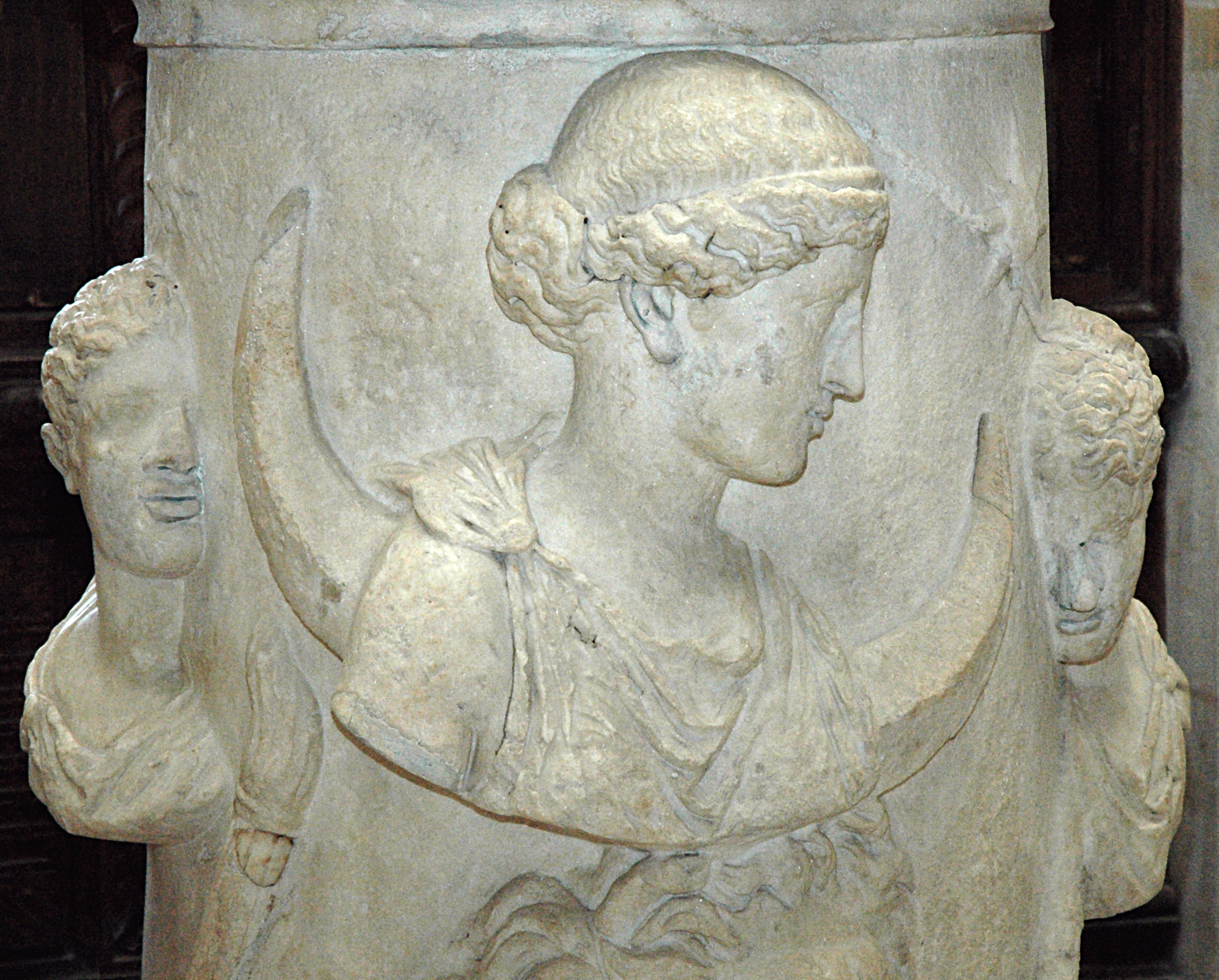
Selene from an altar piece, flanked by either the Dioscuri, or by Phosphorus and Hesperus.

Selene's presence in ancient Greek worship is very limited, even in comparison to her brother. Her presence in cult was linked to her connection to more major, important divinities such as Artemis and Hecate, and she is hardly divorced from her identifications when it comes to worship; in later times, she was adopted into pre-existing cults that had not originally included her, along with several other figures.

Moon figures are found on Cretan rings and gems (perhaps indicating a Minoan moon cult), but apart from the role played by the moon itself in magic, folklore, and poetry, and despite the later worship of the Phrygian moon-god Men, there was relatively little worship of Selene. An oracular sanctuary existed near Thalamai in Laconia. Described by Pausanias, it contained statues of Pasiphaë and Helios. Here Pasiphaë is used as an epithet of Selene, instead of referring to the daughter of Helios and wife of Minos. Pausanias also described seeing two stone images in the market-place of Elis, one of the sun and the other of the moon, from the heads of which projected the rays of the sun and the horns of the crescent moon. Selene (along with Helios, Nyx and others) received an altar at the sanctuary of Demeter at Pergamon, possibly in connection with the Orphic mysteries.

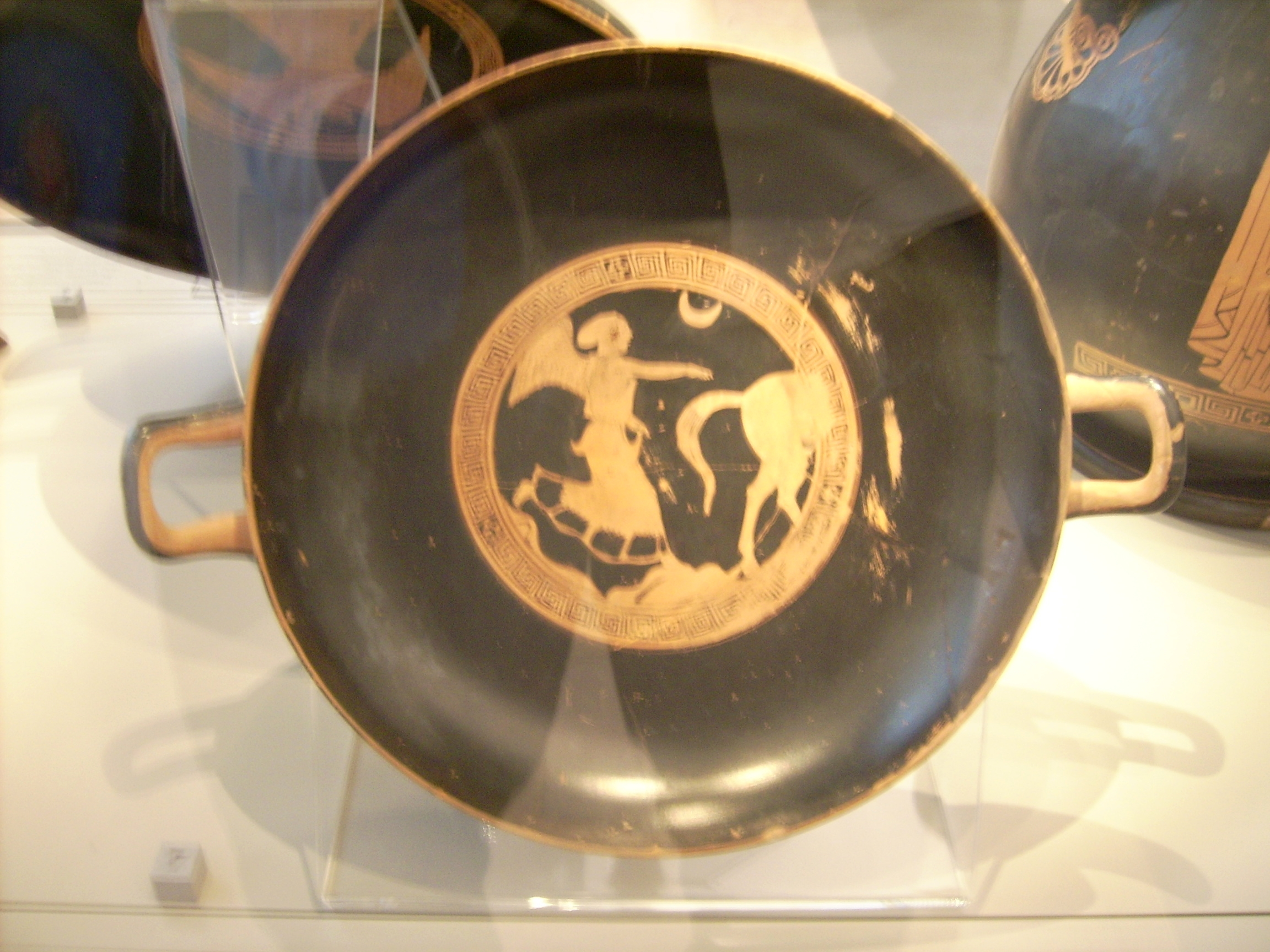
Attic Kylix with Selene and her horse and crescent Moon, circa 450 BC, by the Brygos Painter.

Originally, Pandia may have been an epithet of Selene, but by at least the time of the late Hymn to Selene, Pandia had become a daughter of Zeus and Selene. Pandia (or Pandia Selene) may have personified the full moon, and an Athenian festival, called the Pandia, usually considered to be a festival for Zeus, was perhaps celebrated on the full moon and may have been associated with Selene. At Athens, wineless offerings (nephalia) were made to Selene, along with other celestial gods, Selene's siblings Helios and Eos, and Aphrodite Ourania; in Attica, it seems that Selene was identified with Aphrodite.

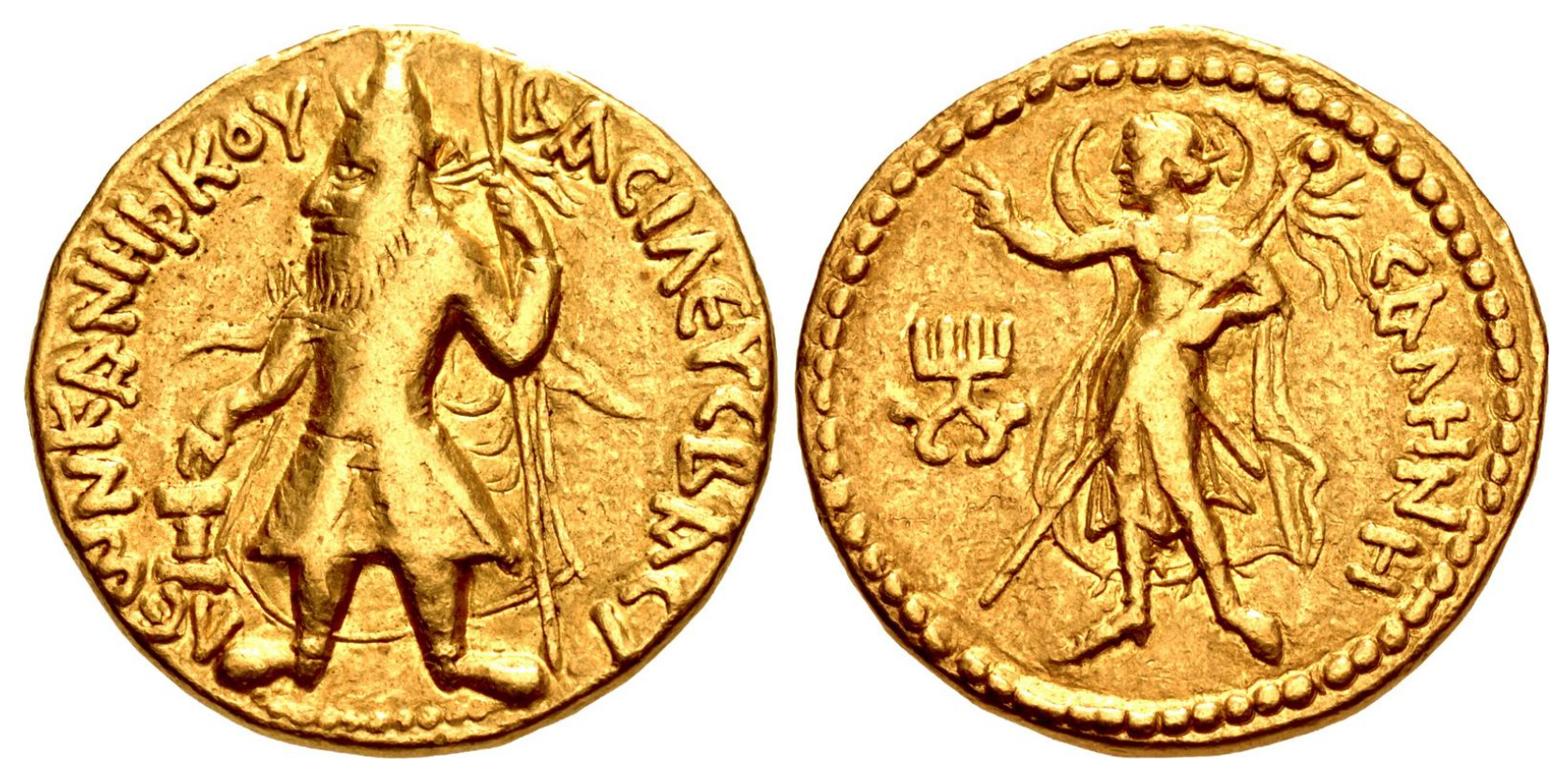
Kushan coinage of Kanishka I with Selene (Greek legend "CAΛHNH") on the reverse, wearing lunar horns, c. AD 127 – 151.

Selene was sometimes associated with childbirth, for it was believed that during the full moon women had the easiest labours; this helped in her identification with the goddess Artemis, as well as other goddesses connected to women's labours. The idea that Selene would also give easy labours to women paved way for identification with Hera and the Roman Juno and Lucina, three other childbirth goddesses; Plutarch calls Selene "Hera in material form." Roman philosopher Cicero connected Selene's Roman counterpart Luna's name to childbirth goddess Lucina's, both deriving from "light" (thus bringing the unborn child into the light). Nonnus also identified Selene with Eileithyia.

Selene played an important role in love magic. In Theocritus' second Idyll, a young girl invokes Selene in a love-spell. The idyll opens with the girl ordering her maid to bring potions and magical utensils, followed by an invocation to Selene and Hecate, and finally the rather lengthy spell itself; once she finishes her spell, the girl recounts to Selene of how she met and was betrayed by her lover, and calls upon the goddess to witness and help her, hence the love tail is woven into the love spell. And, according to a scholium on Theocritus, Pindar wrote that lovesick women would pray to Selene for help, as Euripides apparently had Phaedra, Selene's great-niece, do in his lost play Hippolytus Veiled. Plutarch wrote that Selene was called upon in love affairs because she, the Moon, constantly yearns for the Sun, and compared her in that regard to Isis.

Her and her brother's worship is also attested in Gytheum, a town in Laconia near Sparta, via an inscription (C.I.G. 1392). In the city of Epidaurus, in Argolis, Selene had an altar dedicated to her. Records show that a type of cake called βοῦς (boûs, "ox") decorated with horns to represent the full moon or an ox was offered to her and other divinities like Hecate, Artemis and Apollo. In addition, a type of flat, round moon-shaped cake was called 'selene' ("moon") and was offered "to the goddess." The ancient Greeks also called Monday "day of the Moon" (ἡμέρα Σελήνης) after her.

== Orphic literature ==
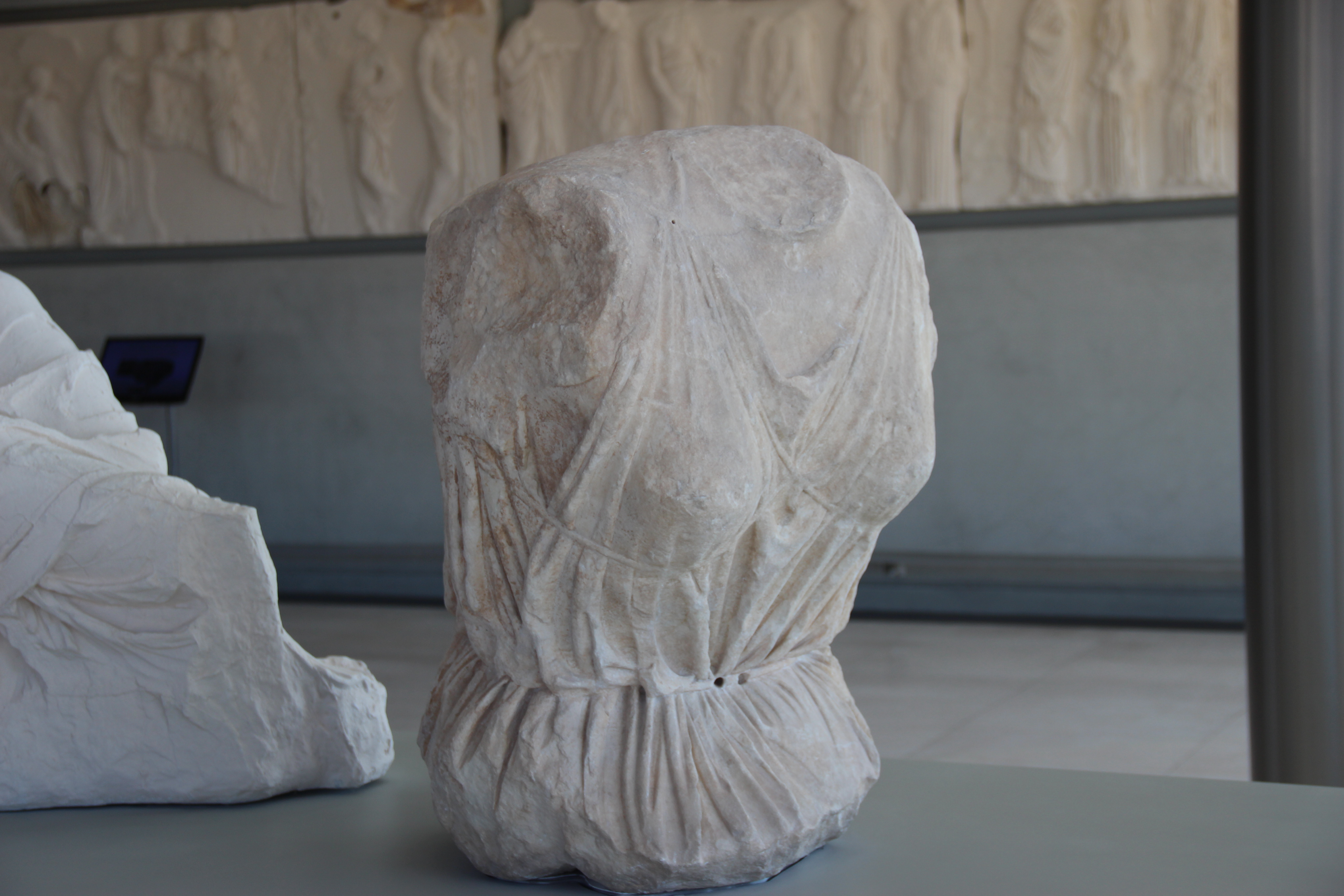
Torso of Selene from the East Pediment of the Parthenon, Acropolis Museum.

According to a certain Epigenes, the three Moirai, or Fates, were regarded in the Orphic tradition as representing the three divisions of Selene, "the thirtieth and the fifteenth and the first" (i.e. the crescent moon, full moon, and dark moon, as delinted by the divisions of the calendar month).

== Namesakes ==
Selene is the Greek proper name for the Moon, and 580 Selene, a minor planet in the asteroid belt, is also named after this goddess. Scientific study of the Moon, particularly lunar geology, is sometimes referred to as selenology, and its practitioners selenologists, to distinguish from Earth-based study.

The chemical element Selenium was named after Selene by Jöns Jacob Berzelius, because of the element's similarity to the element tellurium, named for the Earth (Tellus).

The second Japanese lunar orbiter spacecraft following was named SELENE (Selenological and Engineering Explorer) after Selene, and was also known as Kaguya in Japan. HMS Selene (P254), a 1944 British submarine and Ghia Selene, a concept car from the Ghia design studio from 1959, also bore her name.

== Gallery ==
Selene in art

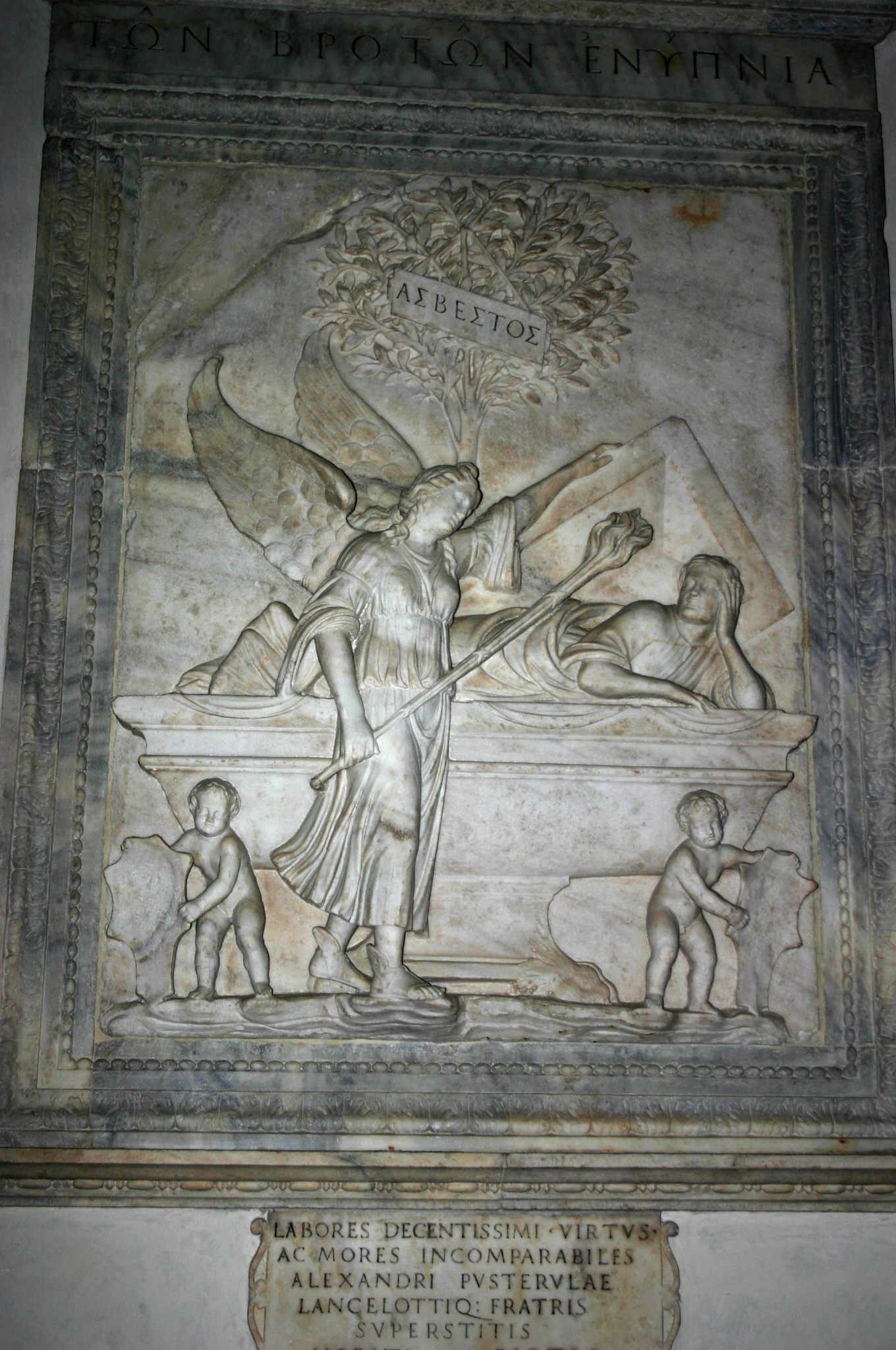
Selene and Endymion relief, Alessandro and Lancellotto Pusterla's gravestone, 16th century.

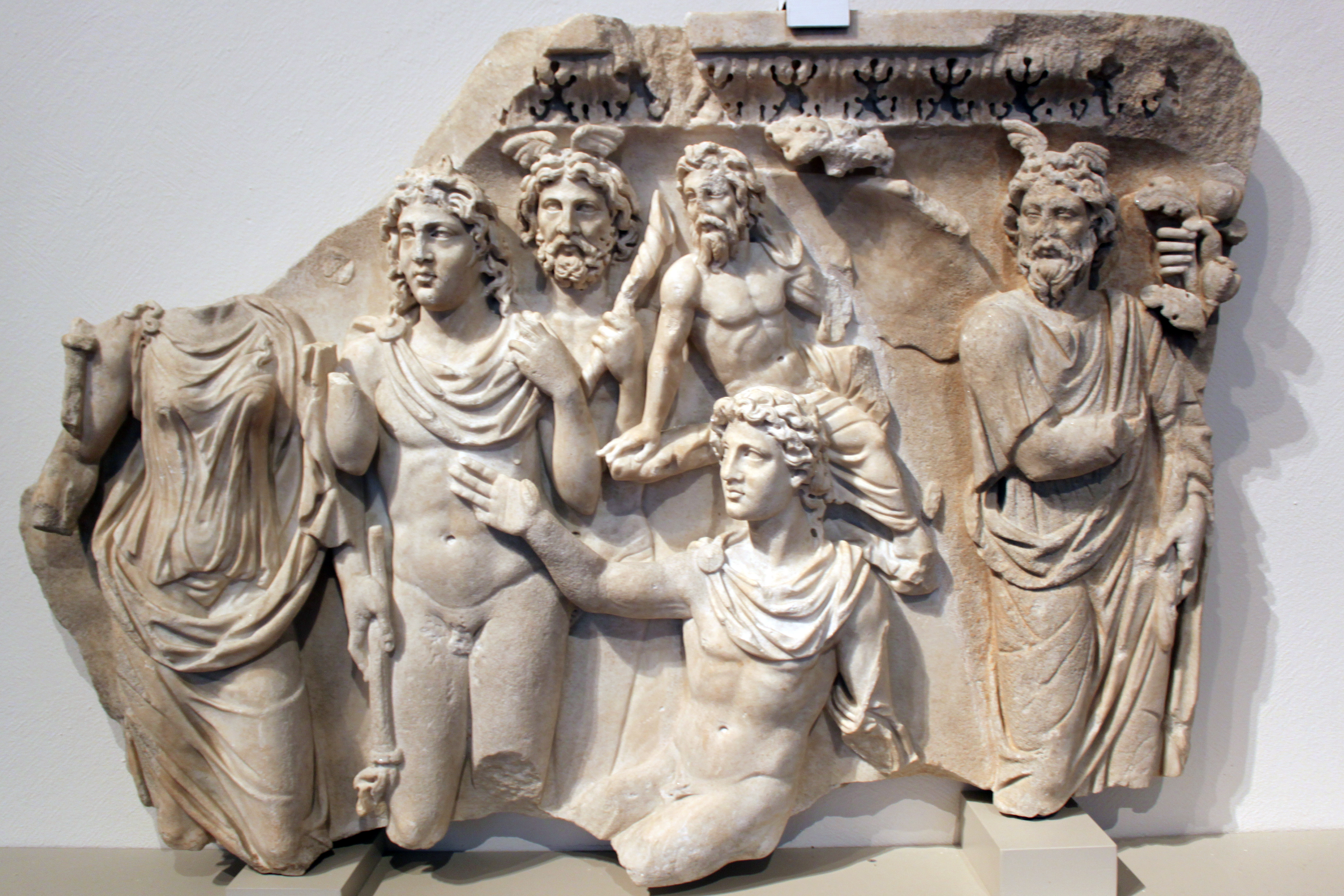
Selene and Endymion standing next to each other, sarcophagus fragment, end of 2nd century AD.

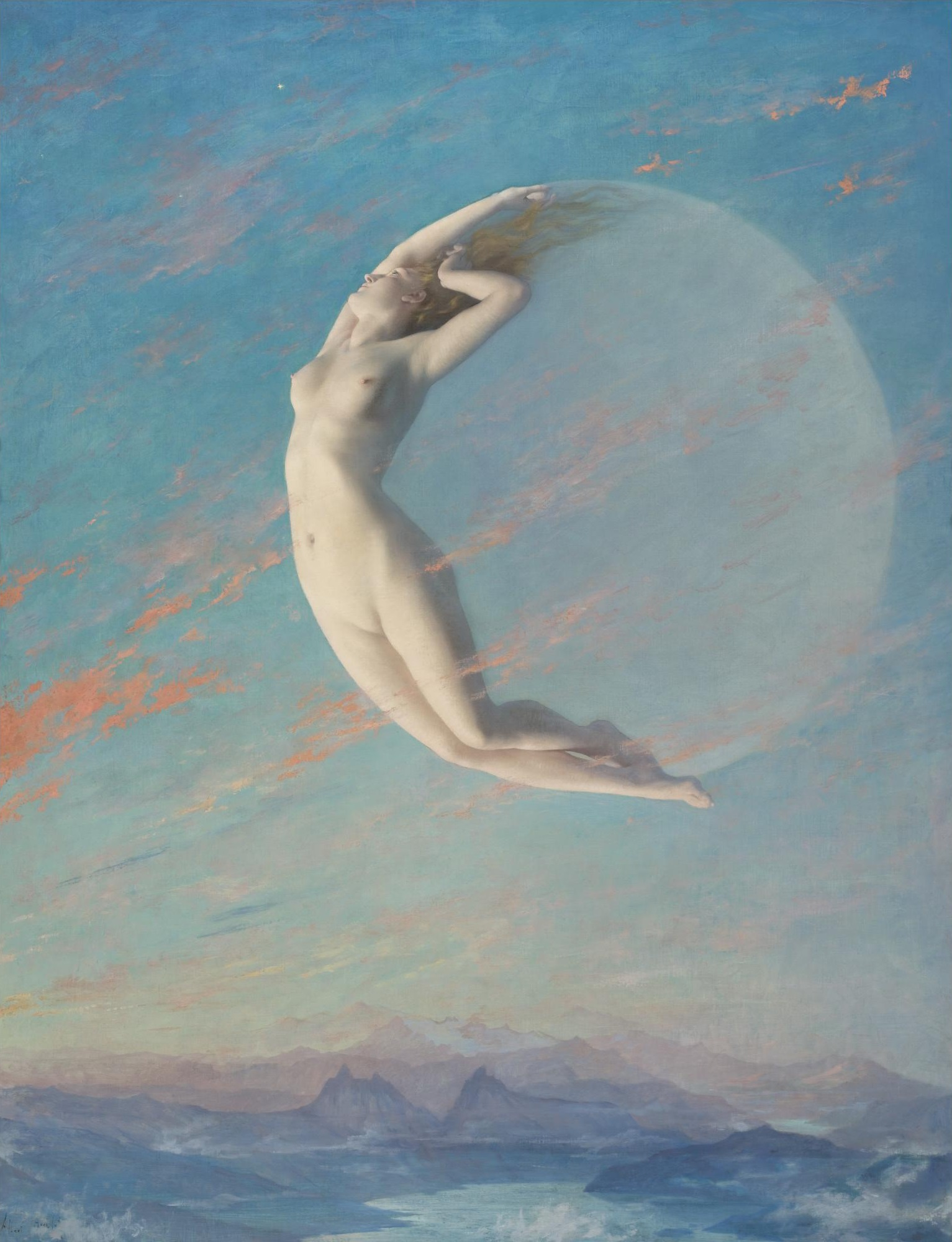
Selene, 1880 painting by Albert Aublet.

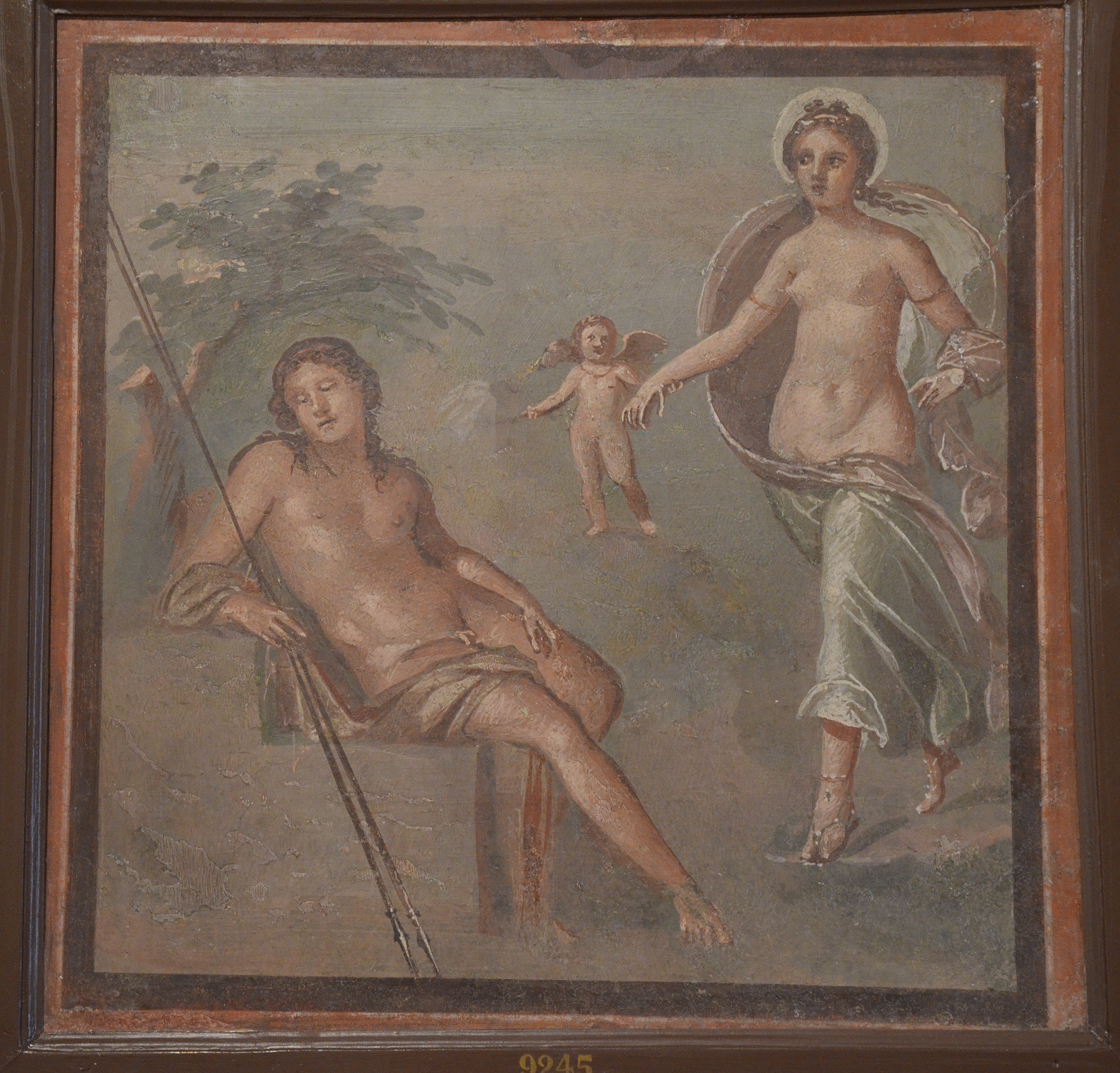
Selene with sleeping Endymion, fresco in the fourth Pompeian style.

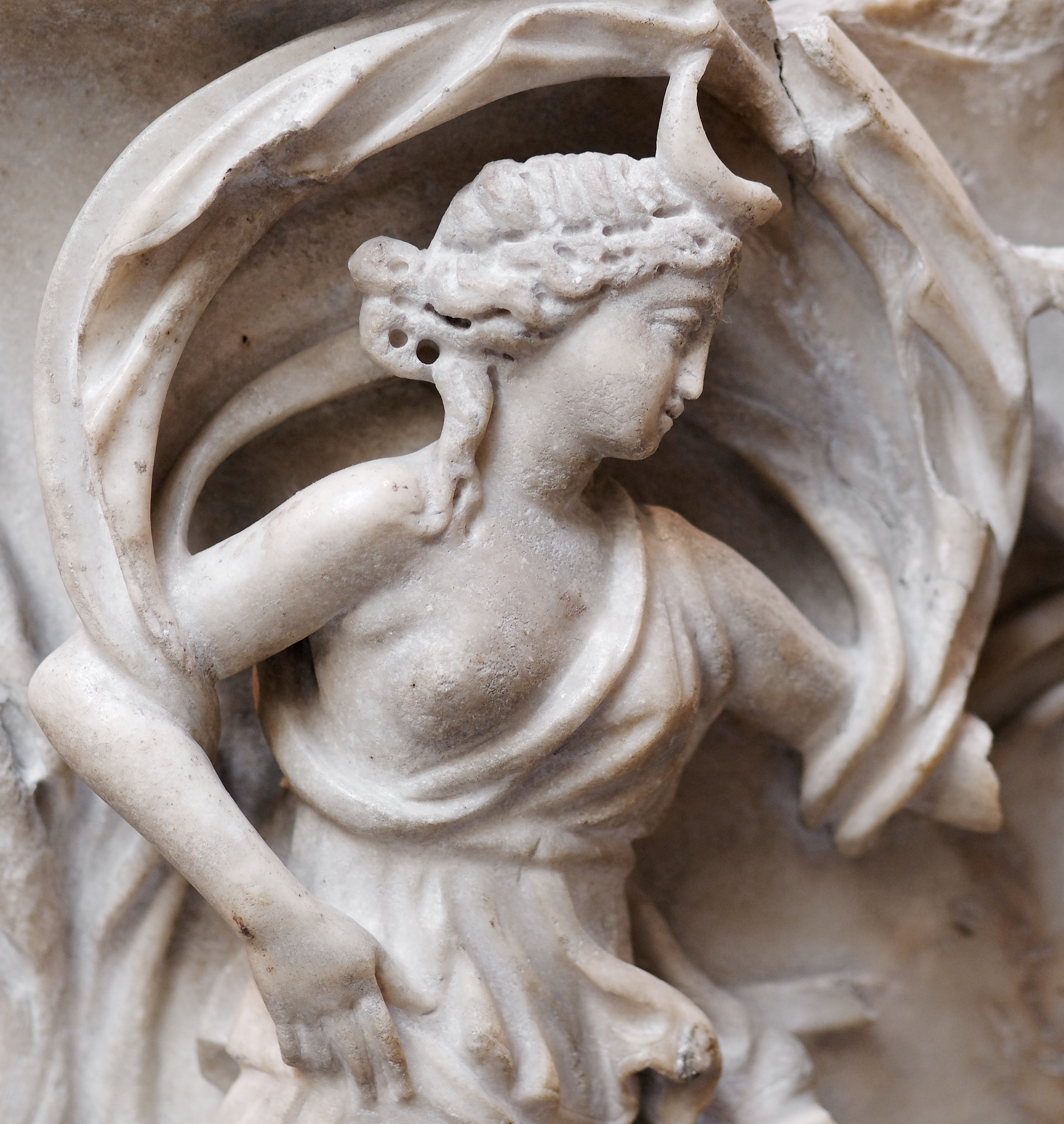
Selene detail from a sarcophagus, imperial period.

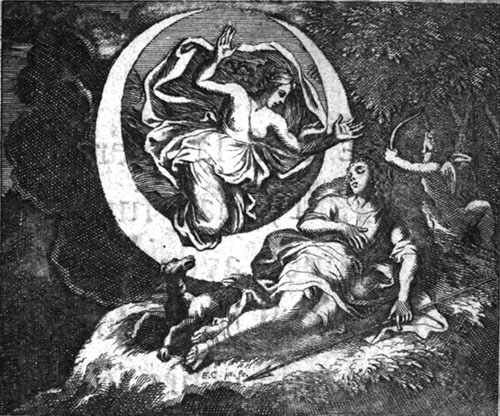
Selene, engraving by François Chauveau.

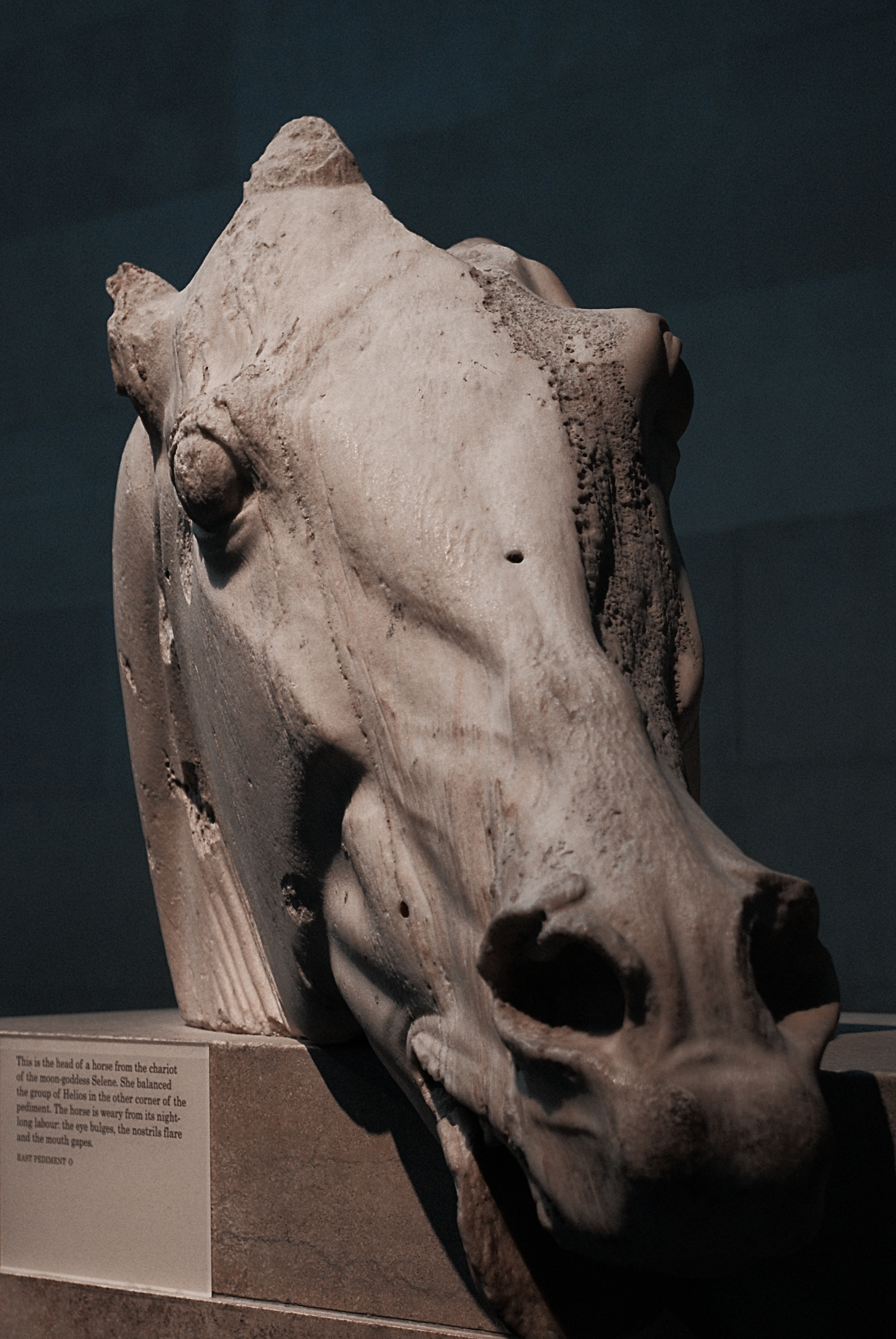
Head of one of Selene's horses.

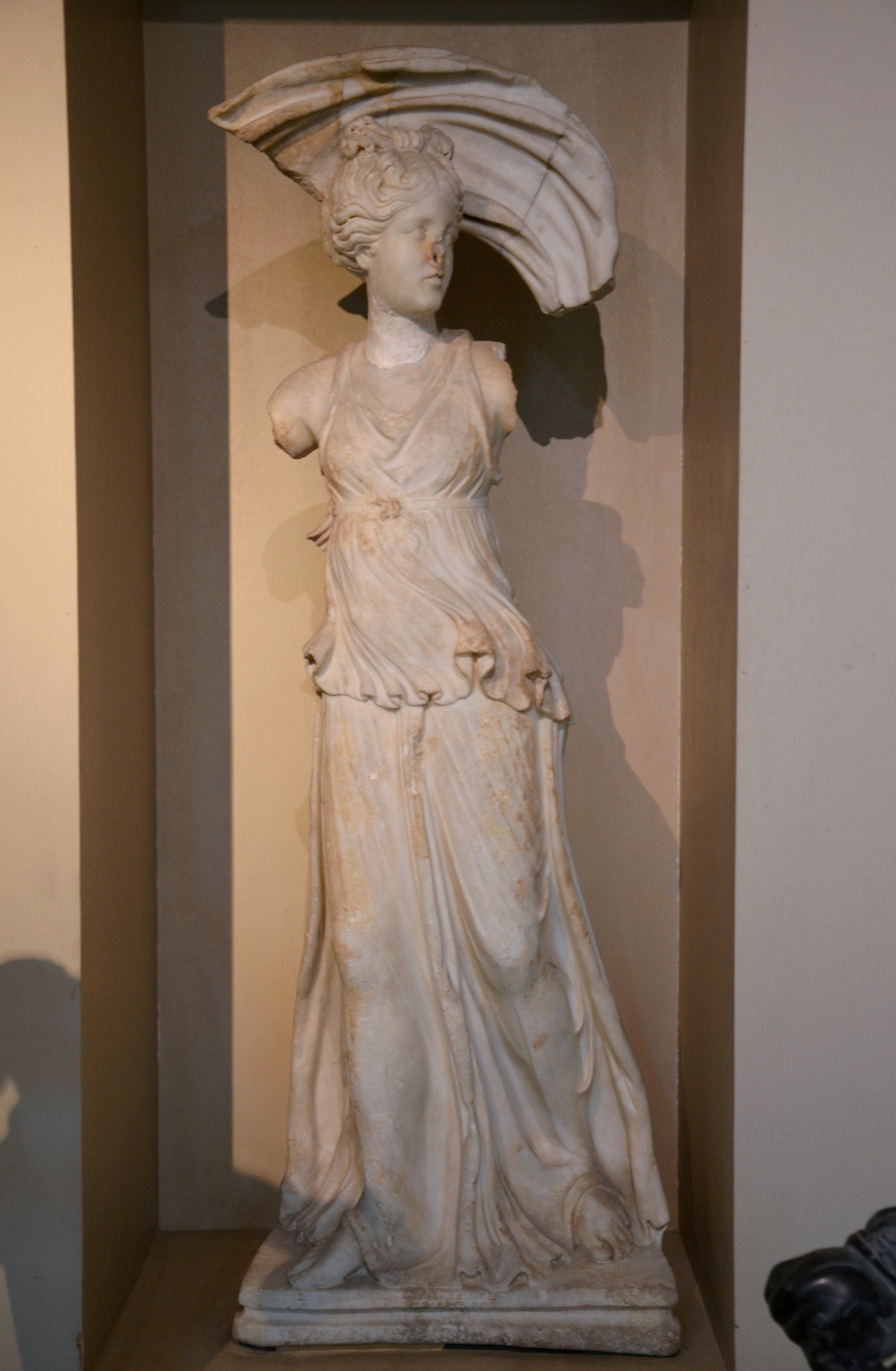
Statue of Selene from the Silahtarağa group representing the Gigantomachy, Istanbul Archeology Museum.

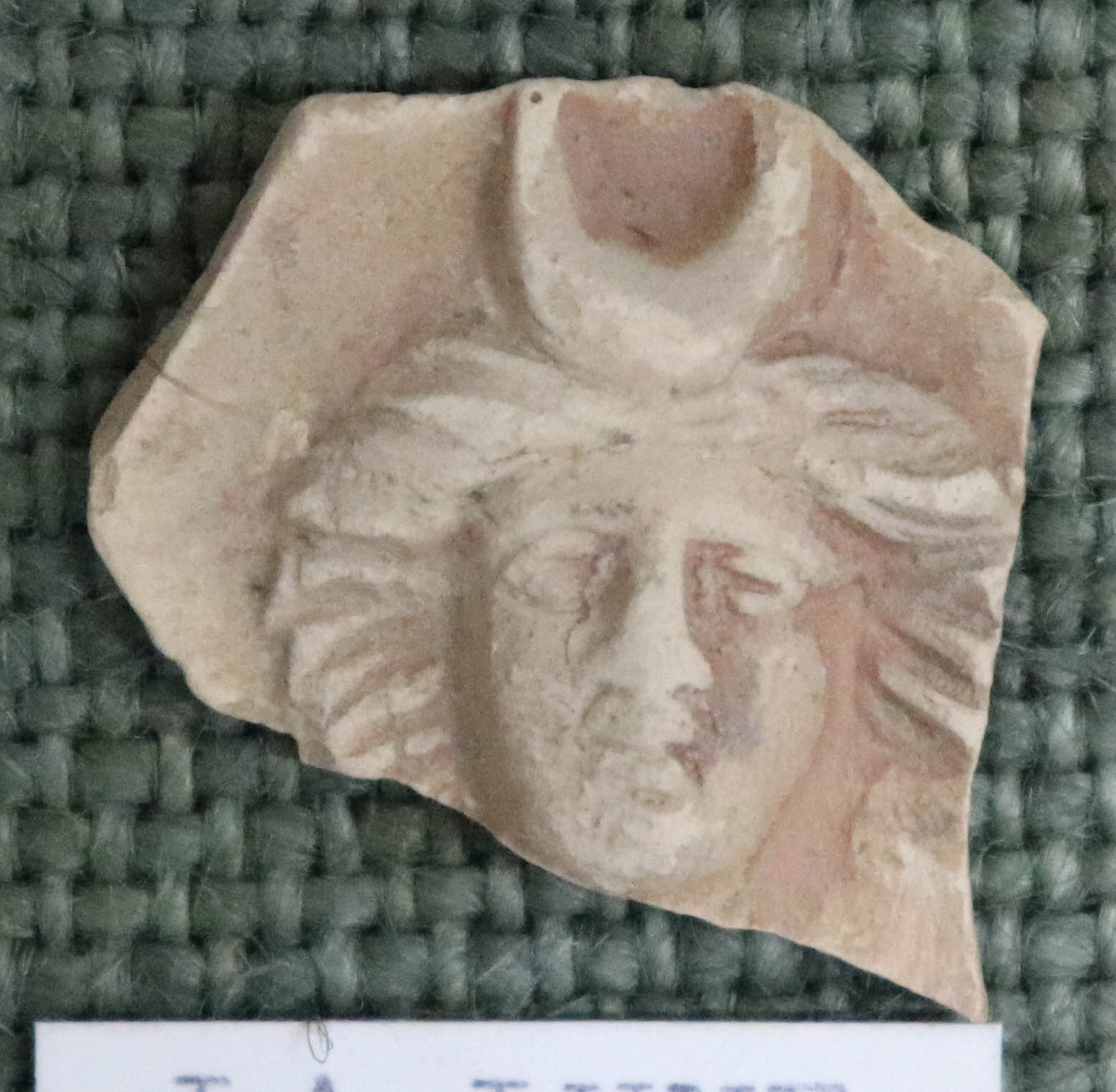
Oil lamp fragment with the head of Selene, early classical period, Musée de Die.

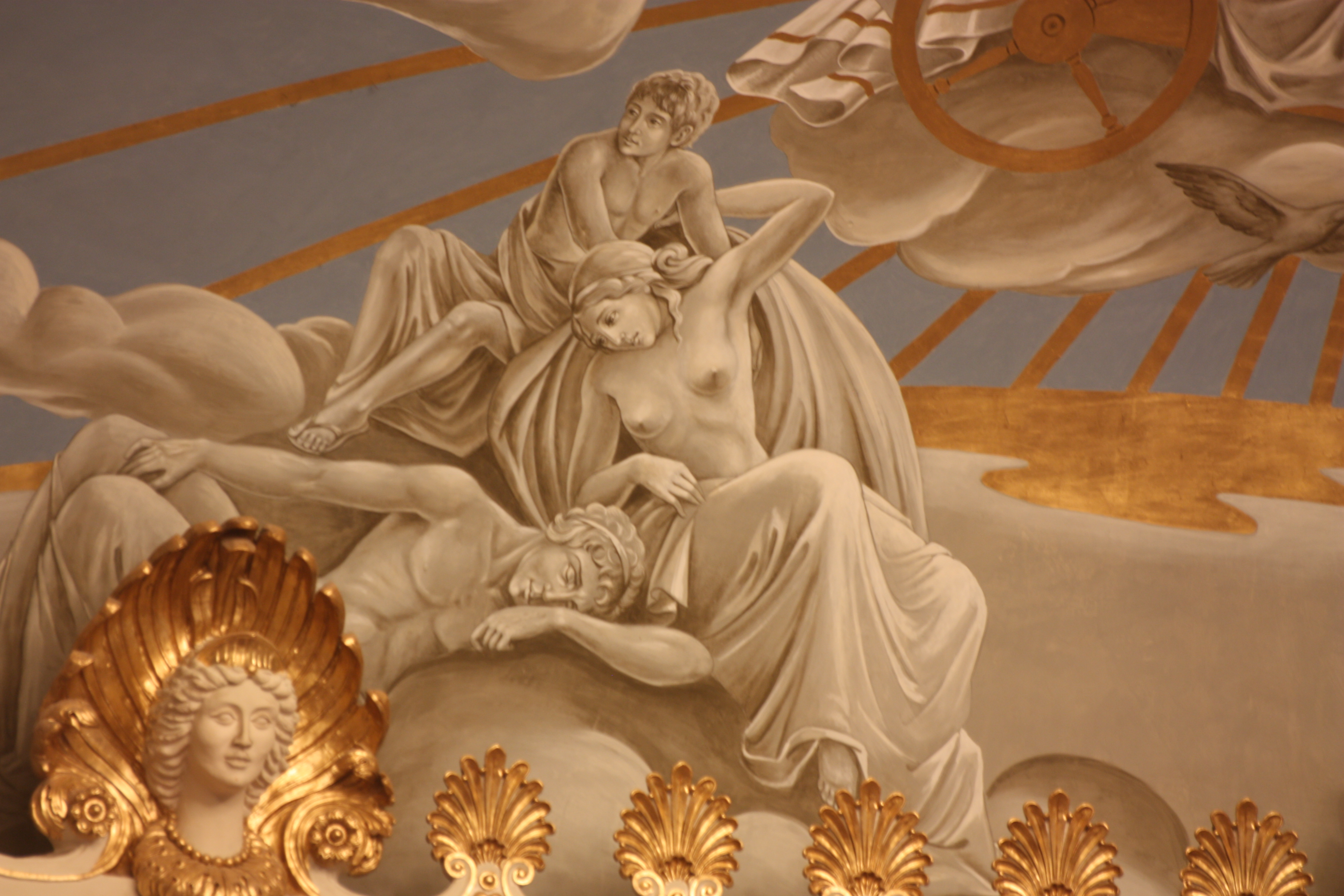
Selene and Endymion, in the mural above the stage of the Friedrich von Thiersch Saal in the Wiesbaden Kurhaus.

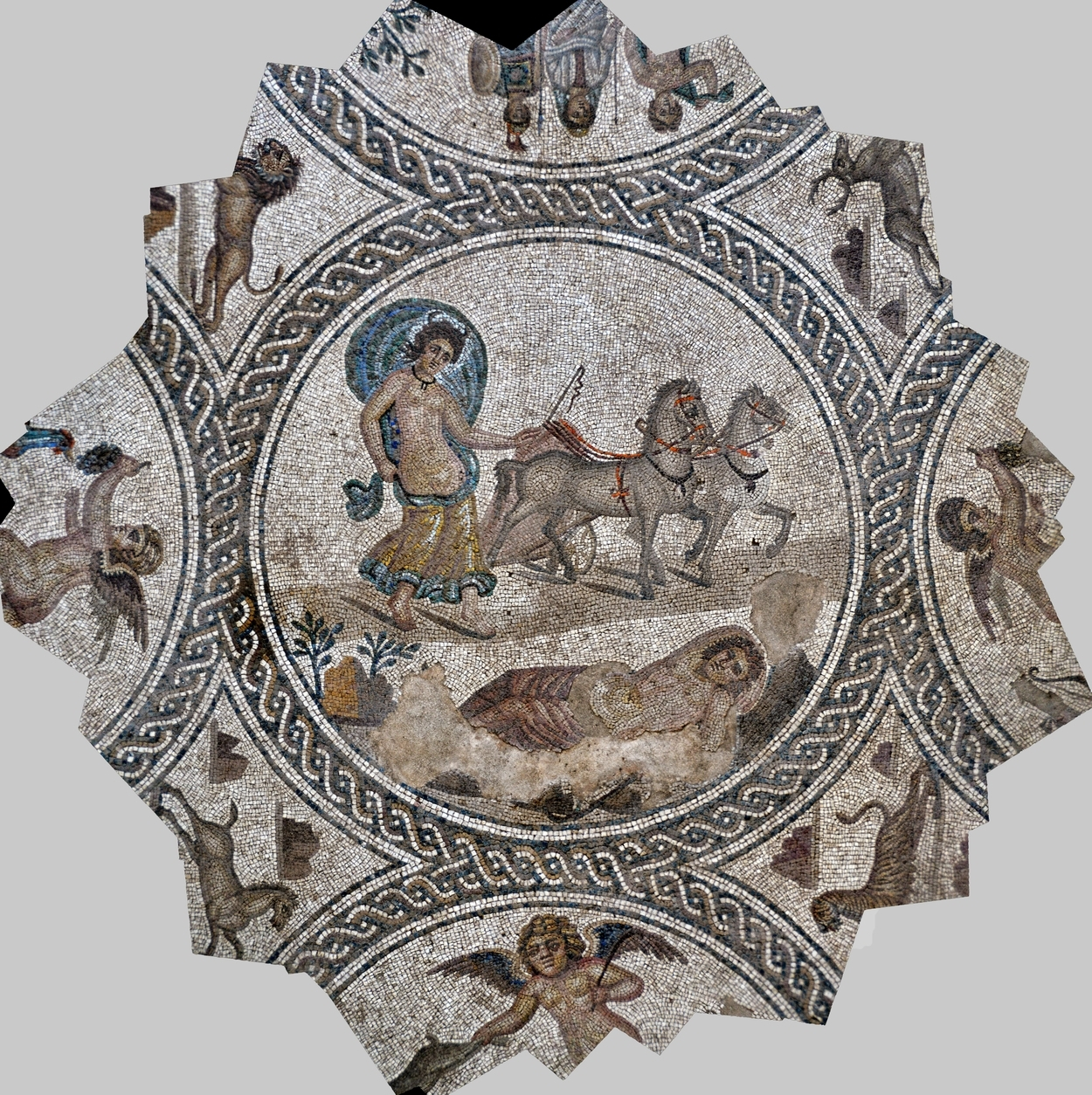
Selene leaving her chariot, Roman mosaic, Andalusia.

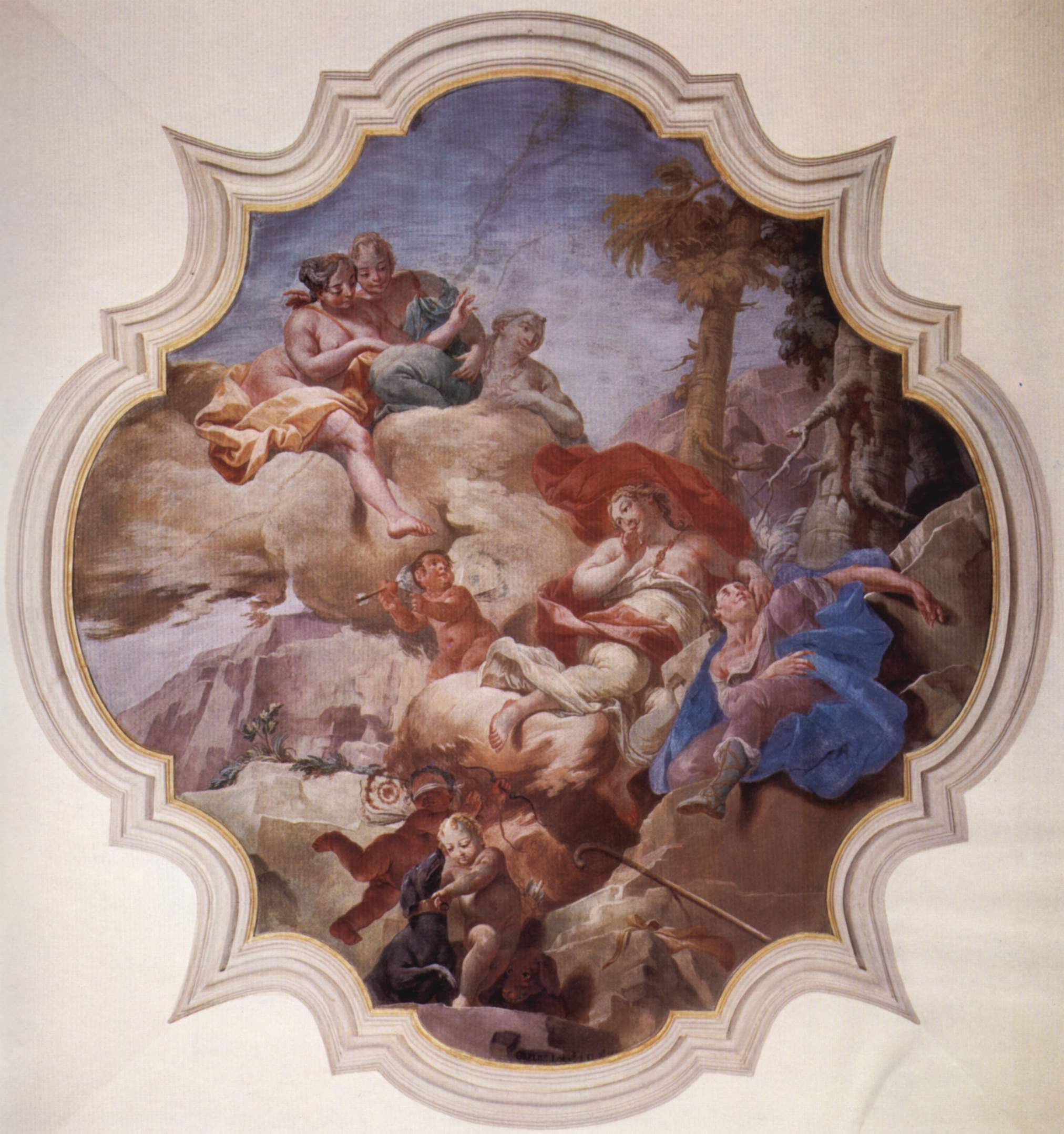
Selene and Endymion, fresco on ceiling by Giuseppe Antonio Orelli, circa 1730–1770, Palazzo Riva.

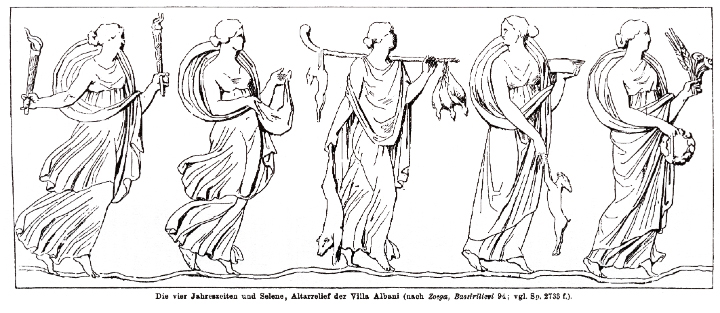
Selene and the Horae, by Wilhelm Heinrich Roscher.

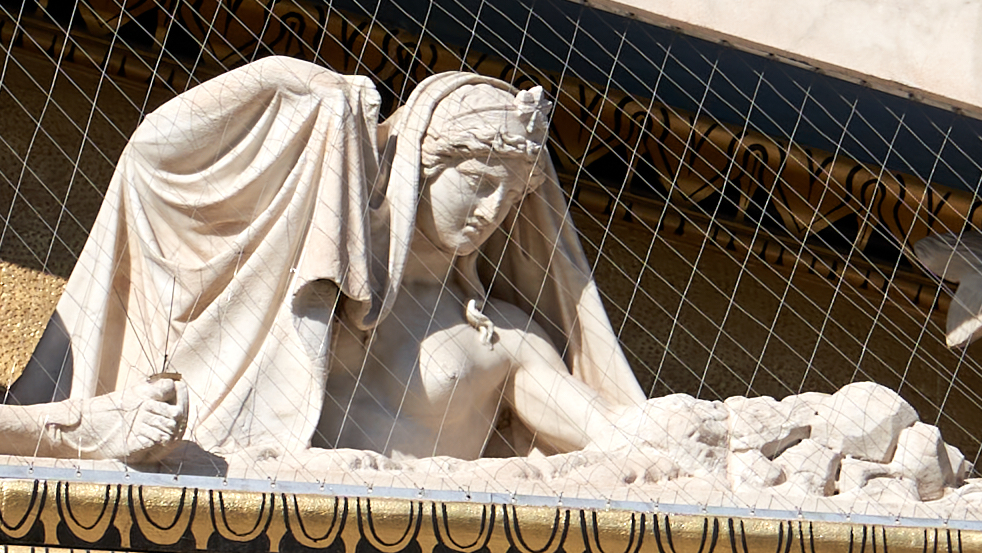
Selene or Nyx in the Academy of Athens, Greece.

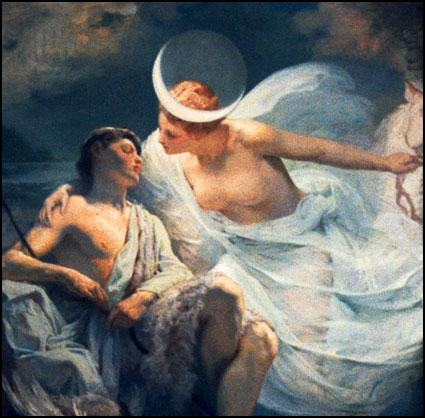
Selene and Endymion, by Albert Aublet.

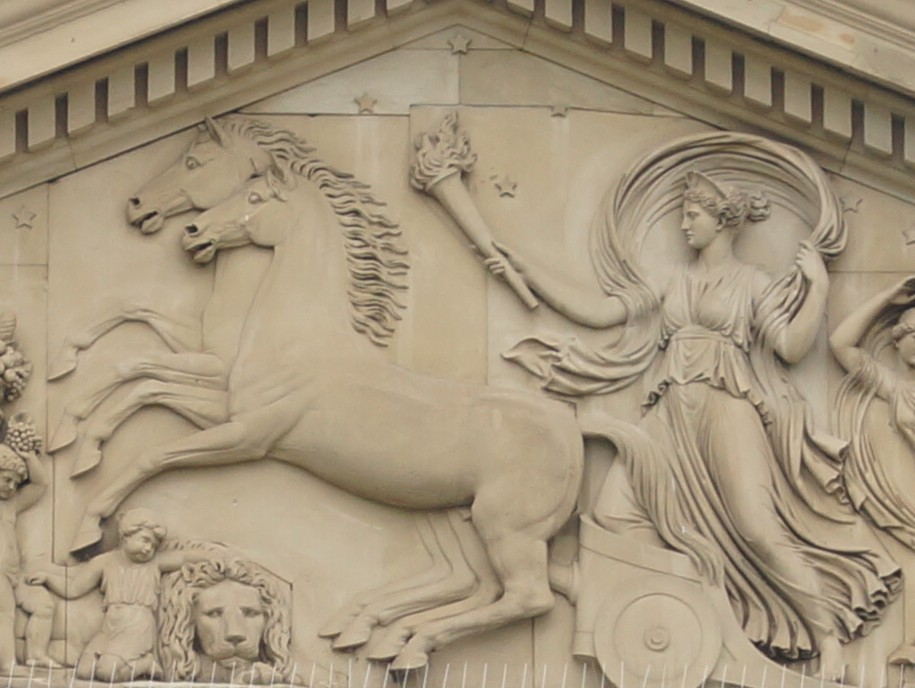
Selene with her chariot in the relief of Rosenstein Palace, Germany.

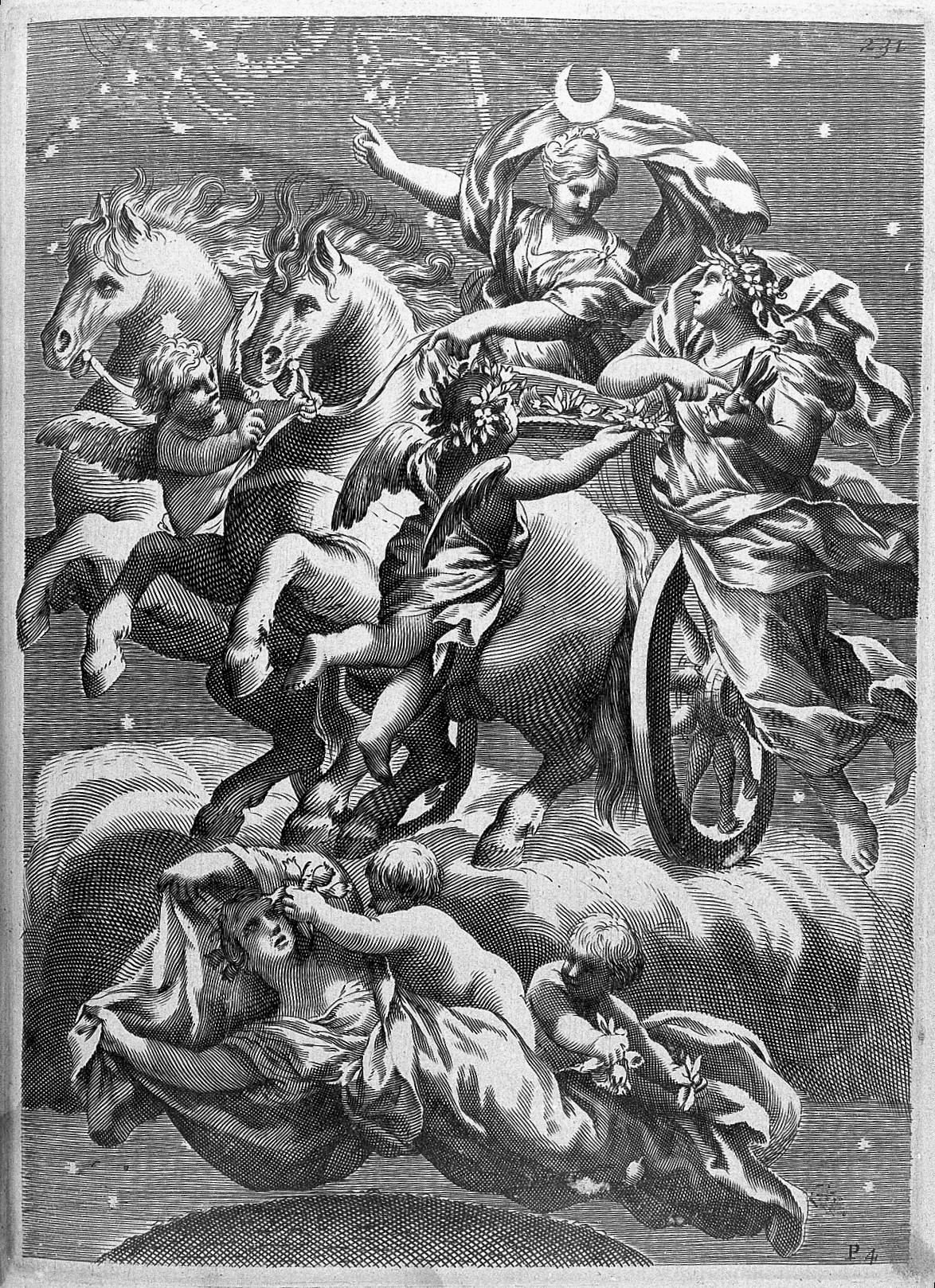
Selene in a flying chariot drawn by two white horses from "Flora, seu florum...", Ferrari 1646.

== Genealogy ==
Selene's family tree

Uranus	Gaia	Pontus
Oceanus	Tethys	Hyperion	Theia	Crius	Eurybia
The Rivers	The Oceanids	Helios	SELENE	Eos	Astraeus	Pallas	Perses
Cronus	Rhea	Coeus	Phoebe
Hestia	Hera	Hades	Zeus	Leto	Asteria
Demeter	Poseidon
Iapetus	Clymene (or Asia)	Mnemosyne	(Zeus)	Themis
Atlas	Menoetius	Prometheus	Epimetheus	The Muses	The Horae

== See also ==
- Diana (mythology)
- Horned deity
- List of lunar deities
- Star and crescent
