= 580 Selene =

Outer main-belt asteroid

Discovery
- Discovered by: M. F. Wolf
- Discovery site: Heidelberg
- Discovery date: 17 December 1905

Designations
- Pronunciation: /səˈliːniː/
- Alternative designations: 1905 SE

Orbital characteristics
- Epoch 31 July 2016 (JD 2457600.5)
- Uncertainty parameter 0
- Observation arc: 110.29 yr (40283 d)
- Aphelion: 3.4971 AU (523.16 Gm)
- Perihelion: 2.9628 AU (443.23 Gm)
- Semi-major axis: 3.2300 AU (483.20 Gm)
- Eccentricity: 0.082713
- Orbital period (sidereal): 5.81 yr (2120.3 d)
- Mean anomaly: 45.310°
- Mean motion: 0° 10^{m} 11.244^{s} / day
- Inclination: 3.6614°
- Longitude of ascending node: 99.154°
- Argument of perihelion: 334.542°

Physical characteristics
- Mean radius: 22.895±1.6 km
- Synodic rotation period: 9.47 h (0.395 d)
- Geometric albedo: 0.1218±0.019
- Absolute magnitude (H): 10.3

580 Selene is a minor planet orbiting the Sun in the asteroid belt. The name Selene is that of an ancient Greek goddess of the Moon. The name may have been inspired by the asteroid's provisional designation 1905 SE.

This body orbits the Sun nearly midway between the orbits of Mars and Jupiter. The orbital eccentricity is slightly lower than that of Mars. Based on its light curve, Selene has an estimated rotation period of 0.3947±0.0004 days, or just under 9.5 hours. During each rotation, the apparent magnitude varies by 0.27. The approximate diameter of this asteroid is 46 km. (Some sources list a diameter of up to 56 km.) The albedo is about 7%, comparable to that of the Earth's Moon.
