= Pandia =

Greek goddess, daughter of Zeus and Selene

In Greek mythology, the goddess Pandia /pænˈdaɪə/ or Pandeia (Ancient Greek: Πανδία, Πανδεία, meaning "all brightness") was a daughter of Zeus and the goddess Selene, the Greek personification of the moon. From the Homeric Hymn to Selene, we have: "Once the Son of Cronos [Zeus] was joined with her [Selene] in love; and she conceived and bare a daughter Pandia, exceeding lovely amongst the deathless gods." An Athenian tradition perhaps made Pandia the wife of Antiochus, the eponymous hero of Antiochis, one of the ten Athenian tribes (phylai).

Originally Pandia may have been an epithet of Selene, but by at least the time of the late Homeric Hymn, Pandia had become a daughter of Zeus and Selene. Pandia (or Pandia Selene) may have personified the full moon, and an Athenian festival called the Pandia (probably held for Zeus) was perhaps celebrated on the full-moon and may have been connected to her.
