= Cecilia =

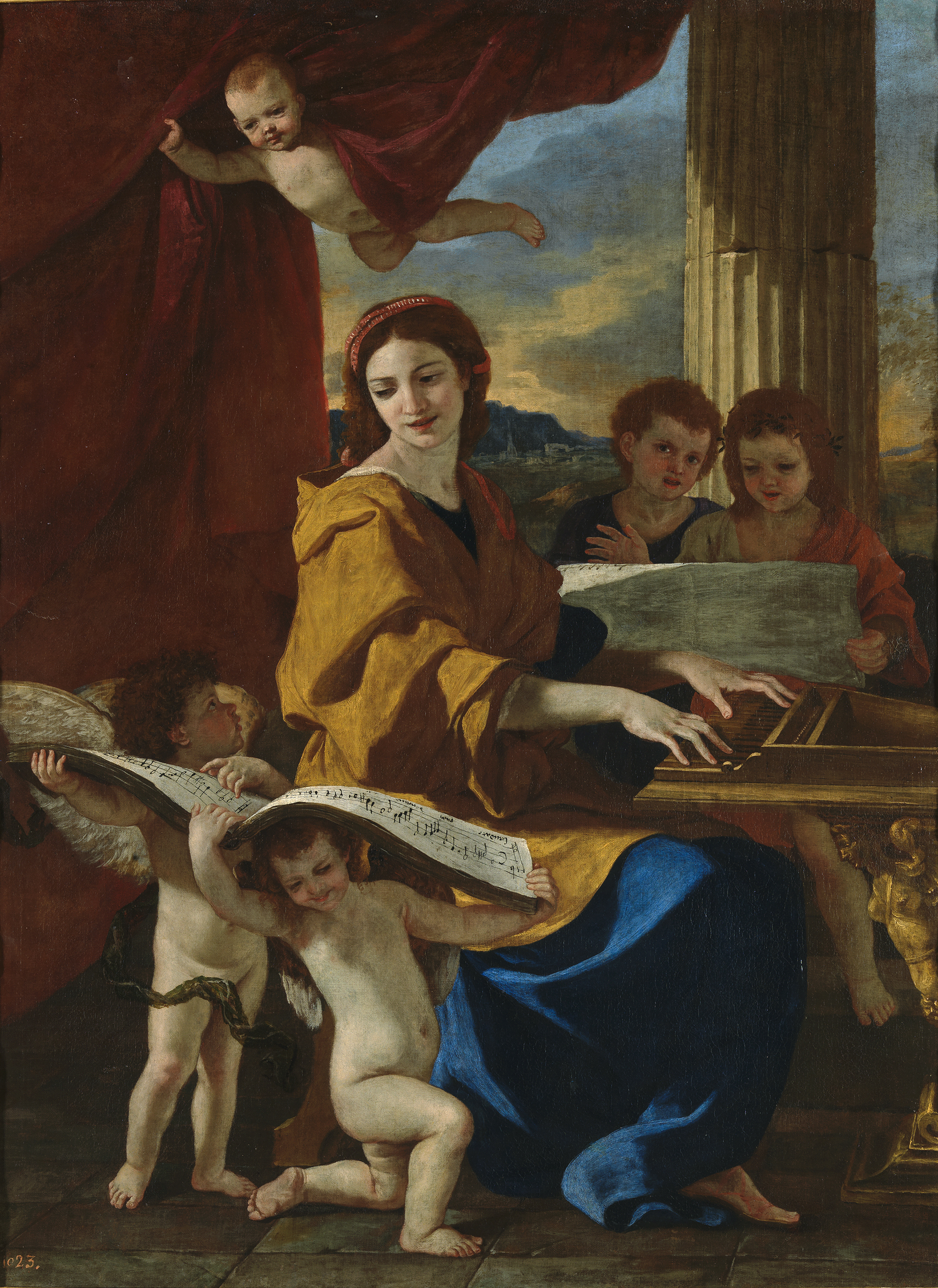
- Saint Cecilia is the patron saint of musicians.
- Pronunciation: /sɪˈsɪliə, -ˈsiːl-/ siss-IL-ee-ə, -EEL-
- Gender: Female
- Name day: November 22

Origin
- Language: Latin

Other names
- Nicknames: Celia, Ceci, Cece, Celie, Lia
- Related names: Cecelia, Cécile, Celia, Celina, Sille

Cecilia is a personal name originating in the name of Saint Cecilia, the patron saint of music.

== History ==
The name has been popularly used in Europe (particularly the United Kingdom and Italy, where in 2018 it was the 43rd most popular name for girls born that year), and the United States, where it has ranked among the top 500 names for girls for more than 100 years. It also ranked among the top 100 names for girls born in Sweden in the early years of the 21st century, and was formerly popular in France.

The name "Cecilia" applied generally to Roman women who belonged to the plebeian clan of the Caecilii. Legends and hagiographies, mistaking it for a personal name, suggest fanciful etymologies. Among those cited by Chaucer in "The Second Nun's Tale" are: lily of heaven, the way for the blind, contemplation of heaven and the active life, as if lacking in blindness, and a heaven for people to gaze upon.

== People ==
- Saint Cecilia, 2nd century virgin martyr and patron saint of musicians and church music
- Cecilia of Normandy (died 1126), thought to be the daughter of William the Conqueror
- Cecilia (royal mistress) (died after 1459), royal mistress and later morganatic wife of Eric of Pomerania, king of Denmark, Norway and Sweden
- Princess Cecilia of Sweden (1540–1627)
- Princess Cecilia of Sweden (1807–1844)
- Cecilia (Norwegian singer), Spanish singer-songwriter Evangelina Sobredo Galanes (born 1967)
- Cecilia Angmadlok Angutialuk (born 1938), Canadian Inuk artist
- Cecilia Arizti (1856–1930), Cuban composer, pianist and music educator.
- Cécilia Attias (born 1957), former First Lady of France, ex-wife of President Nicolas Sarkozy
- Cecilia Bartoli (born 1966), Italian mezzo-soprano
- Cecilia Beaux (1855–1942), American society portrait painter
- Cecilia Bolocco (born 1965), Chilean television entertainer, former Miss Universe 1987 and former wife of ex-Argentine president Carlos Menem
- Cecilia Bowes-Lyon, Countess of Strathmore and Kinghorne (1862–1938), British aristocrat and grandmother of Queen Elizabeth II
- Cecilia Cacabelos (born 1958; disappeared 1976), Argentine student taken by Argentine security forces
- Cecilia Calderón Prieto (born 1949), Ecuadorian economist
- Cecilia Chacón Castillo, Ecuadorian politician
- Cecilia LW Chan, Chinese social scientist
- Cecilia Cheung (born 1980), Hong Kong singer and actress
- Cecilia Colledge (1920–2008), British figure skater
- Cecilia Curbelo (born 1975), Uruguayan writer
- Cecilia Cuțescu-Storck (1879–1969), Romanian painter
- Cecilia Dalman Eek (born 1960), Swedish politician
- Cecilia Damström (born 1988), Finnish composer
- Cecilia Danieli (1943–1999), Italian entrepreneur and industrialist
- Cecília Dassi (born 1989), Brazilian actress
- Cecilia Dazzi (born 1969), Italian actress, television personality and songwriter
- Cecilia D'Elia (born 1963), Italian politician
- Cecilia Eguiluz (born 1974), Uruguayan lawyer and politician
- Cecilia Engström (born 1972), Swedish politician
- Cecilia Eusepi (1910–1928), Italian beatified Roman Catholic
- Cecilia Flores Armenta, Mexican missing persons activist
- Cecilia Gallerani (1473–1536), favourite and most celebrated mistress of Ludovico Sforza, Duke of Milan
- Cecilia Gasdia (born 1960), Italian soprano
- Cecilia Gentili (1972–2024), Activist and Artist
- Cecilia Gillie (1907–1996), English radio executive
- Cecilia Grierson (1859–1934), Argentine physician and activist
- Cecilia Hart (1948–2016), American actress
- Cecilia Heyes (born 1960), British psychologist
- Cécilia Hornus (born 1963), French actress
- Cecilia Immergreen, German VTuber
- Cecilia Johansdotter of Sweden (fl. 1193), Queen Consort of King Canute I of Sweden
- Cecilia Julin (born 1955), Swedish diplomat
- Cecilia Keaveney (born 1968), Irish politician
- Cecilia Knutsdatter (1081/85 – aft. 1131), Danish princess
- Cecilia Loftus (1876–1943), Scottish actress, vaudevillian, and music hall performer
- Cecilia de Madrazo (1846–1932), Spanish textiles collector
- Cecília Malan (born 1983), Brazilian journalist
- Cecilia Malmström (born 1968), Swedish politician
- Cecilia Mangini (1927–2021), Italian film director
- Cecilia Suyat Marshall (1928–2022), American civil rights activist and historian
- Cecília Meireles (1901–1964), Brazilian writer, educator and poet
- Cecília Meireles (politician) (born 1977), Portuguese politician and lawyer
- Cecilia Moens, Canadian developmental biologist
- Cecilia Morel (born 1954), Chilean First Lady, wife of President Sebastián Piñera
- Cecilia Muñoz (born 1962), Director of Intergovernmental Affairs at the White House
- Cecilia del Nacimiento (1570–1646), Spanish writer
- Cecilia Noël (fl. 1990s–2020s), Peruvian-born Latin music artist
- Cecilia Nilsson (actress) (born 1957), Swedish actress
- Cecilia Nilsson (athlete) (born 1979), Swedish retired hammer thrower
- Cecilia Nilsson (orienteer) (born 1966), Swedish orienteering competitor
- Cecilia Pantoja (1943–2023), better known as Cecilia, Chilean singer songwriter
- Cecilia Parker (1914–1993), Canadian actress
- Cecilia Payne-Gaposchkin (1900–1979), English-American astronomer
- Cecilia Peters, Australian actor
- Cecilia Prins (born 1979), Swedish politician
- Cecilia Requena (born 1967), Bolivian politician
- Cecilia Rich, American politician
- Cecilia Santacroce (born 1990), Italian archer
- Cecilia Amoafowaa Sefa (born c. 1983), Ghanaian writer and educator
- Cecilia Soria (born c. 1991), Argentine politician
- Cecilia Strzyzowksi (1994–2023), Argentine murder victim
- Cecilia Suárez (born 1971), Mexican actress
- Cecilia Tait (born 1962), Peruvian volleyball player and politician
- Cecilia Tan (born 1967), American writer
- Cecilia Törn (born 1994), Finnish ice dancer
- Cecilia Tshabalala, South African educator, women's rights activist, clubwoman and writer
- Cecilia Young (1712–1789), English soprano
- Cecilia Zandalasini (born 1996), Italian basketball player

== Fictional characters ==
- Celia Mae, character in Monsters, Inc.
- Cecilia Nuthatch, a character in We're Back! A Dinosaur's Story
- Cecilia Reyes, a character in Marvel Comics
- Cecilia Tallis, the main character in the novel Atonement by Ian McEwan
- Cecilia, one of the characters in the indie video game Jackpot Crash Course

== See also ==
- Cecelia, a variation of this name
- Cécile
- Cecily
- Cäcilia Weber (1727–1793), mother-in-law of Mozart
- Celia (given name)
- Cissy (disambiguation)
- Orpheus
