= Cécile =

Cécile or Cecile is a feminine given name and surname. It is the French form of the name Cecilia, which is derived from the Roman Caecili family.

== People ==
=== Given name ===
- Ce'cile (Cecile Charlton, born 1976), Jamaican musician
- Severin Cecile Abega (1955–2008), Cameroonian author
- Cécile Aubry (1928–2010), retired French film actress and television screenwriter and director
- Princess Cécile of Bourbon-Parma (1935–2021), French humanitarian and political activist
- Cecile Bonnifait (born 1971), French architect based in New Zealand
- Cécile Bozanga (born 1951), Central African politician and banker
- Cécile Breccia, French actress
- Cécile Brunschvicg (1877–1946), French feminist politician
- Cécile Bruyère (1845–1909), Benedictine nun
- Cécille Calmette (born 1968), French tennis player
- Cécile Chabot (1907–1990), Canadian poet and illustrator
- Cécile Chaminade (1857–1944), French composer and pianist
- Cécile Charrier (born 1983), French neurobiologist
- Cecile de Brunhoff (1903–2003), French storyteller
- Cécile de France (born 1975), Belgian actress
- Cecile of France (c. 1097–1145), French princess
- Cécile Delpirou (born 1964), French politician
- Cécile DeWitt-Morette (1922-2017), French mathematician and physicist
- Cécile Fatiman (fl. 1791), voodoo priestess and a figure of the Haitian Revolution
- Cécile Guillame (1933–2004), French engraver
- Cécile Haussernot (born 1998), French chess player
- Cecile Hulse Matschat (1895–1976), American author, geographer and botanist
- Cecile Jospé (1928–2004), American photographer and watercolorist
- Cecile Licad (born 1961), Filipina virtuoso classical pianist
- Cécile Lignot-Maubert (born 1971), French hammer thrower
- Cecile Brawley Long (1900–1983), American clubwoman
- Cécile Manorohanta (21st century), Malagasy politician
- Cécile Mourer-Chauviré (born 1939), French paleontologist
- Cécile de Massy (born 1968), member of the Monegasque Princely Family
- Cecile O'Rahilly (1894–1980), Irish scholar
- Cécile Ousset (born 1936), French pianist
- Cécile Paoli (born 1961), French actress
- Cecile Pin (born 1995), French-born author based in London
- Cecile Platovsky (20th century), Belgian American fashion designer
- Cecile Reynaud (born 1953), volleyball educator
- Cecile Richards (1957–2025), American feminist and abortion-rights activist
- Cécile Rigaux (born 1969), French beach volleyball player
- Cécile McLorin Salvant (born 1989), American jazz vocalist
- Cécile Schott (21st century), French musician
- Cecile Sinclair (born 1987), Dutch model
- Cecile D. Singer (born c. 1929), New York politician
- Cécile Untermaier (born 1951), French politician and civil servant
- Cécile Vogt-Mugnier (1875–1962), French neurologist

=== Surname ===
- Louis-Pierre Cécile (1905–1995), Ontario lawyer and political figure

== Fictional characters ==
- Cécile Croomy, a minor character in the 2006–2008 anime Code Geass
- Cécile de Maron, a character on the German soap opera Verbotene Liebe
- Cécile Cosima Caminades, a minor character in the 2010 video game Metal Gear Solid: Peace Walker
- Cecile Horton, a character in DC Comics and The Flash
- Cécile de Volanges, a character in the French epistolary novel Les Liaisons dangereuses by Pierre Choderlos de Laclos
- Cécile, fictional character in Bonjour Tristesse
- Cecille, fictional character in Sesame Street

== Science ==
- Cecile (moth) a genus of moths in the family Apatelodinae

== See also ==
- Sainte-Cécile (disambiguation)
