= Danieli (surname) =

Danieli is a surname and may refer to:

- Cecilia Danieli (1943–1999), Italian entrepreneur and industrialist
- Emma Danieli (1936–1998), Italian actress and television personality
- Francesca Danieli (1953 – 2006), American collage artist, photographer, and filmmaker.
- Francesco Danieli (born 1981), Italian historian and iconologist.
- Isa Danieli (born 1937), Italian film actress
- Nicola Danieli (born 1998), Italian football player
- Otto Danieli, Swiss curler and 1975 World Champion

== See also ==
- Danieli (disambiguation)
