= Silye =

Silye is a surname. Notable people with the surname include:

- Erik Silye (born 1996), Hungarian footballer
- Jim Silye (born 1946), Canadian politician and former football player

== See also ==
- Sille (given name)
