= Danielli (disambiguation) =

Danielli (born 1987) is a female Brazilian football midfielder.

Danielli may refer to:

== People ==
Given name

- Danielli Yuri-Barbosa (born 1984), judoka from Brazil

Surname

- Donatella Danielli (born 1966), professor of mathematics
- James Frederic Danielli FRS (1911–1984), English biologist
- Maurizio Danielli (born 1949), Italian rower
- Simon Danielli (born 1979), English retired rugby union player

== Other uses ==
- Danielli Furton, human rare genetic disorder formed by Macrosomia, Obesity, Macrocephaly and Ocular abnormalities
- Davson–Danielli model, a model of the plasma membrane of a cell, proposed in 1935 by Hugh Davson and James Danielli.
- Equus quagga danielli, a plains zebra that lived in South Africa until becoming extinct late in the 19th century
- Thaumatococcus daniellii, a plant species from Africa, known for being the natural source of thaumatin

== See also ==
- Daniel (disambiguation)
- Danieli (disambiguation)
