= Siciliano (surname) =

Siciliano is a surname. Notable people with the surname include:

- Andrew Siciliano (born 1974), American sports television anchor, reporter and radio broadcaster
- Angelo Siciliano (aka Charles Atlas, 1892–1972), Italian-born American bodybuilder
- Antonio Siciliano (born 1936), Italian film editor
- Barbara Siciliano (1972–2025), Italian volleyball player
- Bruno Siciliano (footballer) (born 1938), Brazilian footballer
- Dani Siciliano, American singer
- Enzo Siciliano (1934–2006), Italian writer, playwright, literary critic and intellectual
- Louis Siciliano (born 1975), Italian music composer,
- Robert Siciliano (born 1968), American security analyst, author and media personality

== See also ==
- Siciliano (disambiguation)
- Sicilia (surname)
