= Saint Peter the Apostle Church =

Historic church in New Jersey, United States

- U.S. National Register of Historic Places
- New Jersey Register of Historic Places
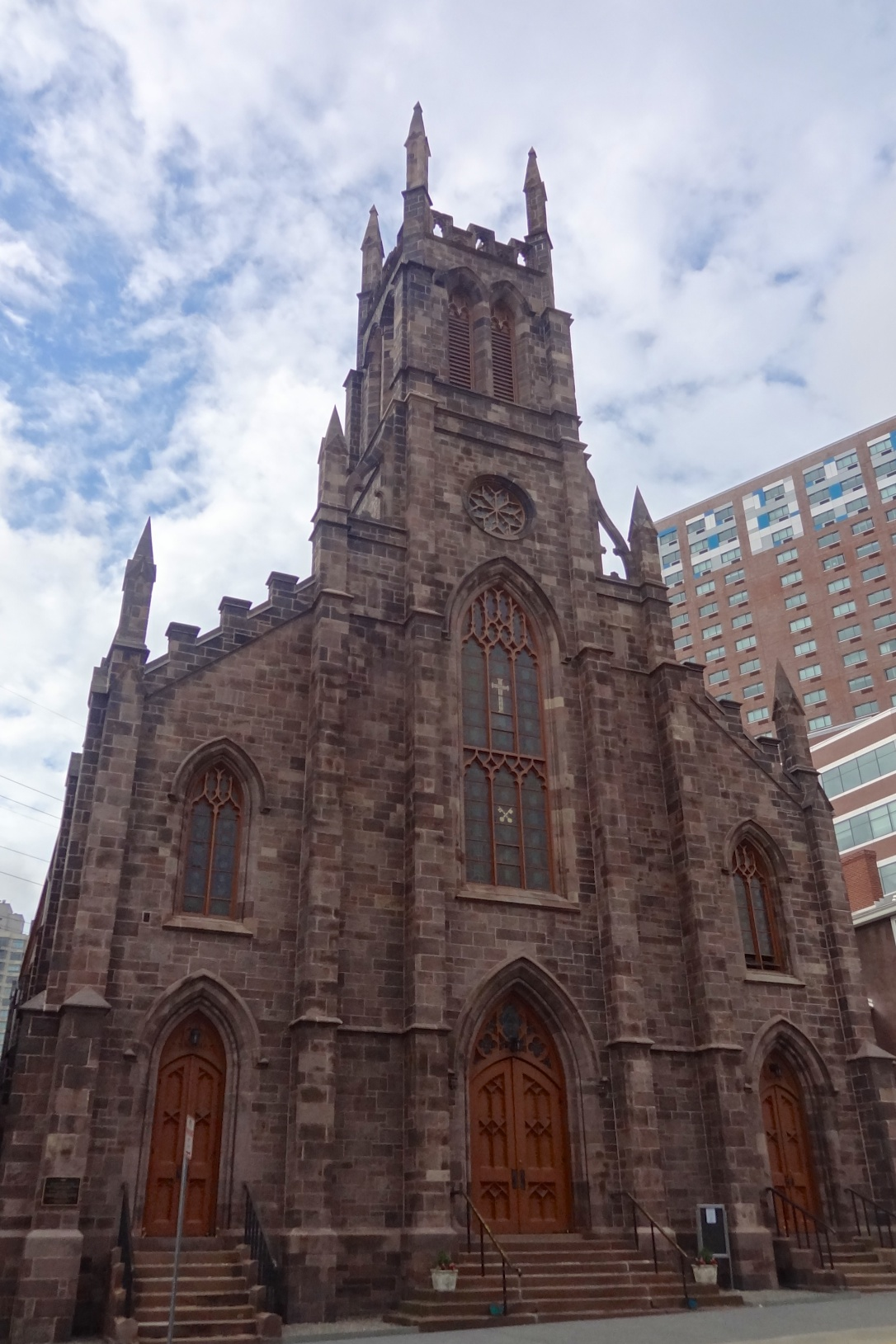

- Location within Middlesex County, New Jersey Location within New Jersey Location within the United States
- Location: 94 Somerset Street, New Brunswick, New Jersey
- Coordinates: 40.4977°N 74.44610°W
- Area: 0.9 acres (0.4 ha)
- Built: 1865
- Architect: Keely, Patrick Charles; O'Rourke, Jeremiah, et al.
- Architectural style: Gothic Revival, Greek Revival
- NRHP reference No.: 05001332
- NJRHP No.: 4257

Significant dates
- Added to NRHP: November 25, 2005
- Designated NJRHP: May 25, 2005

Saint Peter the Apostle Church is a historic Roman Catholic church at 94 Somerset Street in New Brunswick, Middlesex County, New Jersey, United States.

Originally, St. Peter's, the first Catholic church in New Brunswick was on Bayard Street consisted mostly of Irish Catholics, and was set up in 1829.

The newer church building was built in 1865 and was added to the National Register of Historic Places on November 25, 2005, for its significance in architecture.

== History ==
The first recorded visit of a Catholic priest to New Brunswick occurred in 1825, when a Fr. McDonough who was traveling from New York to Philadelphia stopped to visit a Catholic family here. That same year, Father John Powers, from St. Peter's Parish in New York City, came and celebrated Mass. He began offering Mass here monthly, first in a private home and then in a large room over a wheelwright's shop on George Street.

In 1829, the Bishop of New York, John Dubois, sent Father Joseph Schneller to continue the monthly visits to New Brunswick. Bishop Dubois erected St. Peter & Paul Parish in 1829, and a simple brick church was built on Bayard Street in New Brunswick in 1831, although not without difficulty. Anti-Catholic sentiment made it necessary for Father Schneller to use creative means to obtain land for the new church. In 1833, Father Bernard McArdle became the first resident pastor in New Brunswick, and it was during his tenure that the New Brunswick Tornado of June 19, 1835 partially destroyed the church, which remained in use after being closed up with boards.

Father John Rogers, an Irishman who came to America and became a priest at the invitation of Bishop Dubois, after meeting him in Dublin during the 1820s, became the first permanent resident pastor in 1845. In addition to his pastoral zeal, Father Rogers is rightly considered the “founding pastor” of St. Peter's as we know it today. He began his tenure at St. Peter's by rescuing the church building from foreclosure, repairing and expanding it, and constructing the first parish school. However, this was only a foretaste of great things to come. With New Brunswick thriving and the Catholic population rapidly increasing, Father Rogers often traveled to surrounding towns to celebrate the sacraments. St. Peter's became the “Mother Church” of Central Jersey, with missions throughout Middlesex and Somerset Counties.

In 1853, property was purchased for a new and larger church on Somerset Street across from the campus of Rutgers College. The well-known Irish-American church architect Patrick Charles Keely was commissioned to design a new “cathedral”. The present church was built from 1854 through 1865, with the cornerstone laid upon the completion of the lower church in 1856. In 1870, a magnificent chime of bells was installed, one of only three of its kind in New Jersey, which is still played on significant feasts and other special occasions. A sorely needed sacristy was added to the church in 1891. The current marble altar and reredos were installed in 1919 (the altar was reconfigured in 1967, in accordance with the liturgical reforms of Vatican II), and the stained-glass windows were replaced in 1950. In 1999, the current electronic organ was installed. The Lyceum building, constructed in 1920, served various needs of the parish and schools until 2009.

The St. Peter's Rectory is a fine example of Greek Revival architecture which was built sometime before the parish acquired the Somerset Street property. It has been the home of every pastor since Father Rogers, as well as almost 75 other priests who have served St. Peter's over the past 150 years. Today, the rectory is home to the New Brunswick Congregation of the Oratory of St. Philip Neri, a community of priests and brothers who serve St. Peter's Parish, Catholic Campus Ministry at Rutgers, and other pastoral works in the Diocese of Metuchen.

The Sisters of Charity of Convent Station were invited to staff the parish school in 1867, and a convent was constructed for the sisters next to the new church. The convent was enlarged in 1897, 1922 and again in 1952, in order to provide accommodations for thirty-five sisters. Sisters of Charity and sisters from other communities continued to reside there through 2004. After significant exterior restoration and a complete interior renovation, the convent building reopened in January 2010 as the new campus ministry center for Catholic students at Rutgers University.

In 1892, a new parish school, which came to be known as Columbia Hall, was built near the original St. Peter's Hospital on Somerset Street. Next door, a new elementary school with a gymnasium was constructed in 1960, and a new high school replaced Columbia Hall in 1970. St. Peter the Apostle High School closed in 2007, amid declining enrollment. The elementary school, after merging briefly with St. Mary of Mount Virgin School, closed in 2010. The parish is currently exploring potential uses for the school buildings, which remain in serviceable condition.

St. Peter's Hospital, founded out of the parish in the 1860s, moved from Somerset Street to its present location on Easton Avenue in the 1920s. Since then, the hospital has been rebuilt and greatly expanded, and it currently serves as the only Catholic hospital in the Diocese of Metuchen.

In 1991, the basement church with its replica Lourdes grotto was converted to a parish hall. The basement was renovated in 2010-2011 for continued use as a parish hall to be shared by the parish and campus ministry communities, and to house new parish offices in previously underutilized space. The new offices and parish hall opened in December 2011.

St. Peter the Apostle Parish celebrated its 175th anniversary in 2004. The 150th anniversary of the laying of the church's cornerstone was observed in 2006. In 2005, the Church, Rectory and Convent were placed on both the New Jersey and National Registers of Historic Places. Currently, a multi-phase restoration process is underway in order to preserve these beautiful buildings while also ensuring they will be safe and attractive spaces to be used by future generations of parishioners.

Today, St. Peter's Parish is a center of Catholic life in New Brunswick, just as it has been for over 175 years and for generations to come.

St. Peter's is recognized as having the finest historical archives in the Diocese of Metuchen.

== Gallery ==
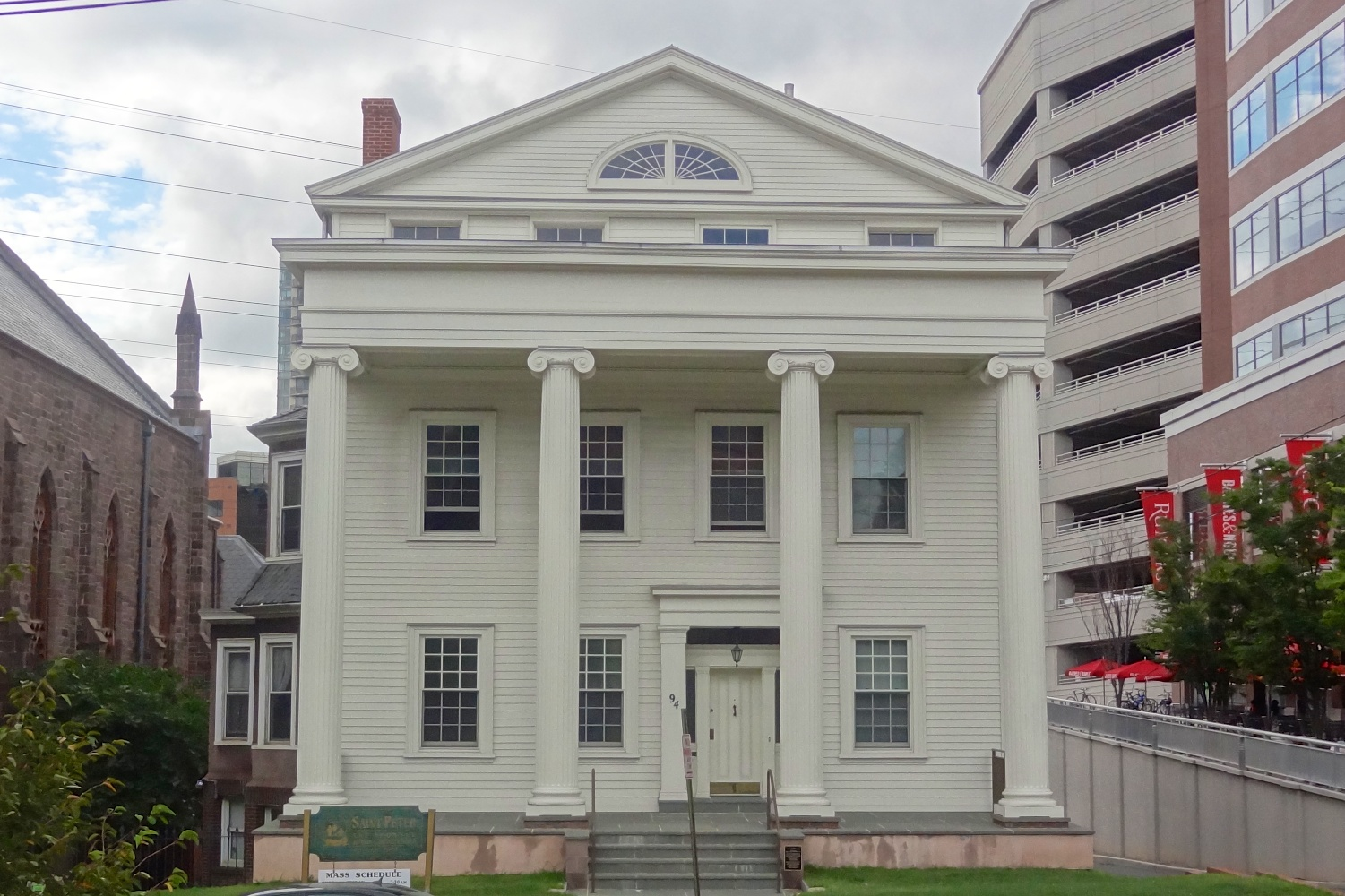
The rectory

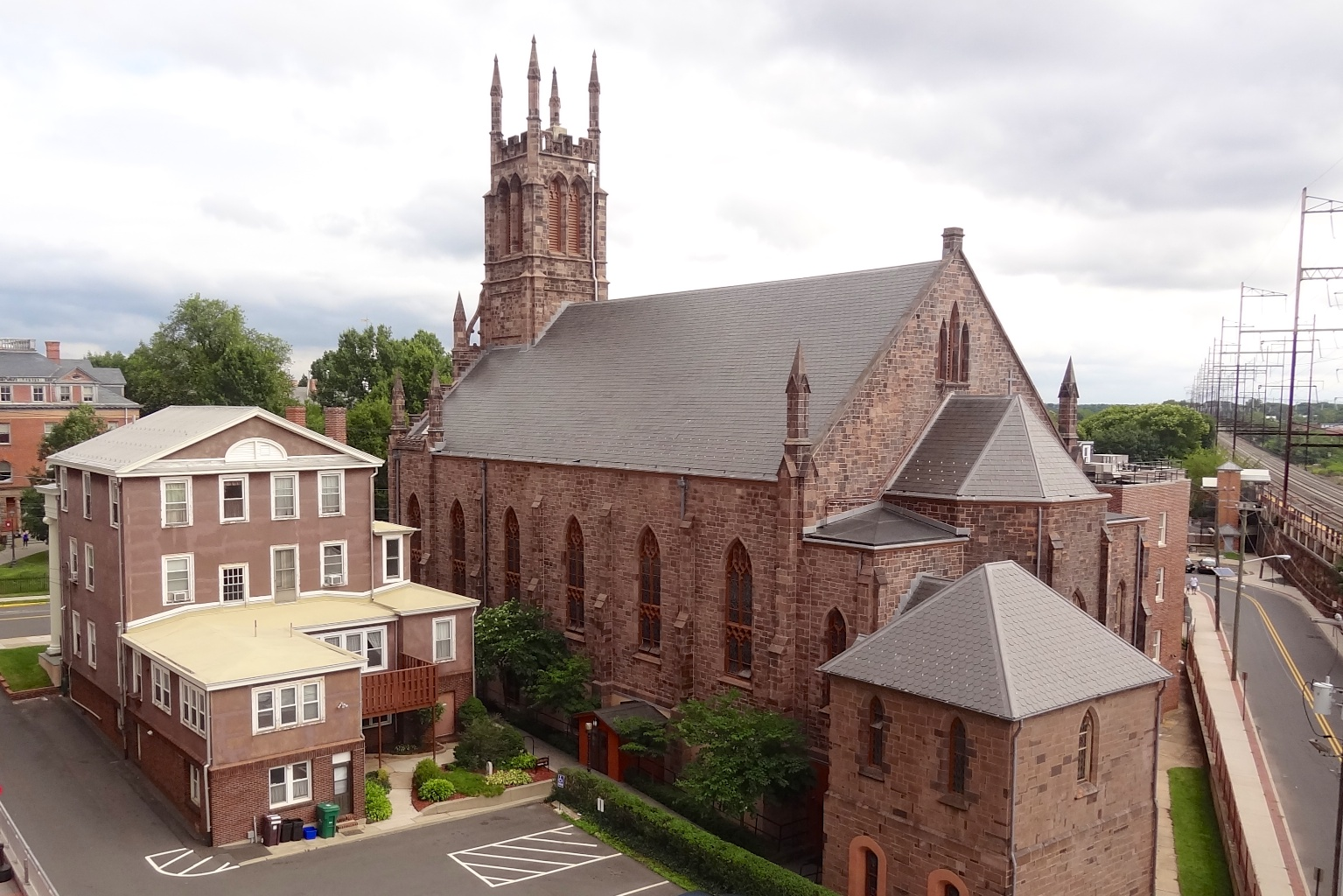
The back yard
