= Sicilia (disambiguation) =

Sicilia refer to Sicily

Sicilia may also refer to:

- Sicilia (Roman province), a Roman province
- Sicilia (surname), a surname
- Sicilia!, a 1998 Italian black-and-white film directed by Danièle Huillet and Jean-Marie Straub
- Italian ironclad Sicilia
- SS Sicilia, a German steamship
- La Sicilia, Italian national daily newspaper for the island of Sicily., breed of horse from Sicily
- Vega Sicilia, a Spanish winery in the Ribera del Duero
- 1258 Sicilia, dark background asteroid from the outer regions of the asteroid belt

== See also ==
- Sicilian
- Siciliana
- Siciliano (disambiguation)
- Sicily (disambiguation)
