= Torre degli Sciri =

Coordinates: 43°06′46″N 12°23′05″E

Sciri tower
- Torre degli Sciri
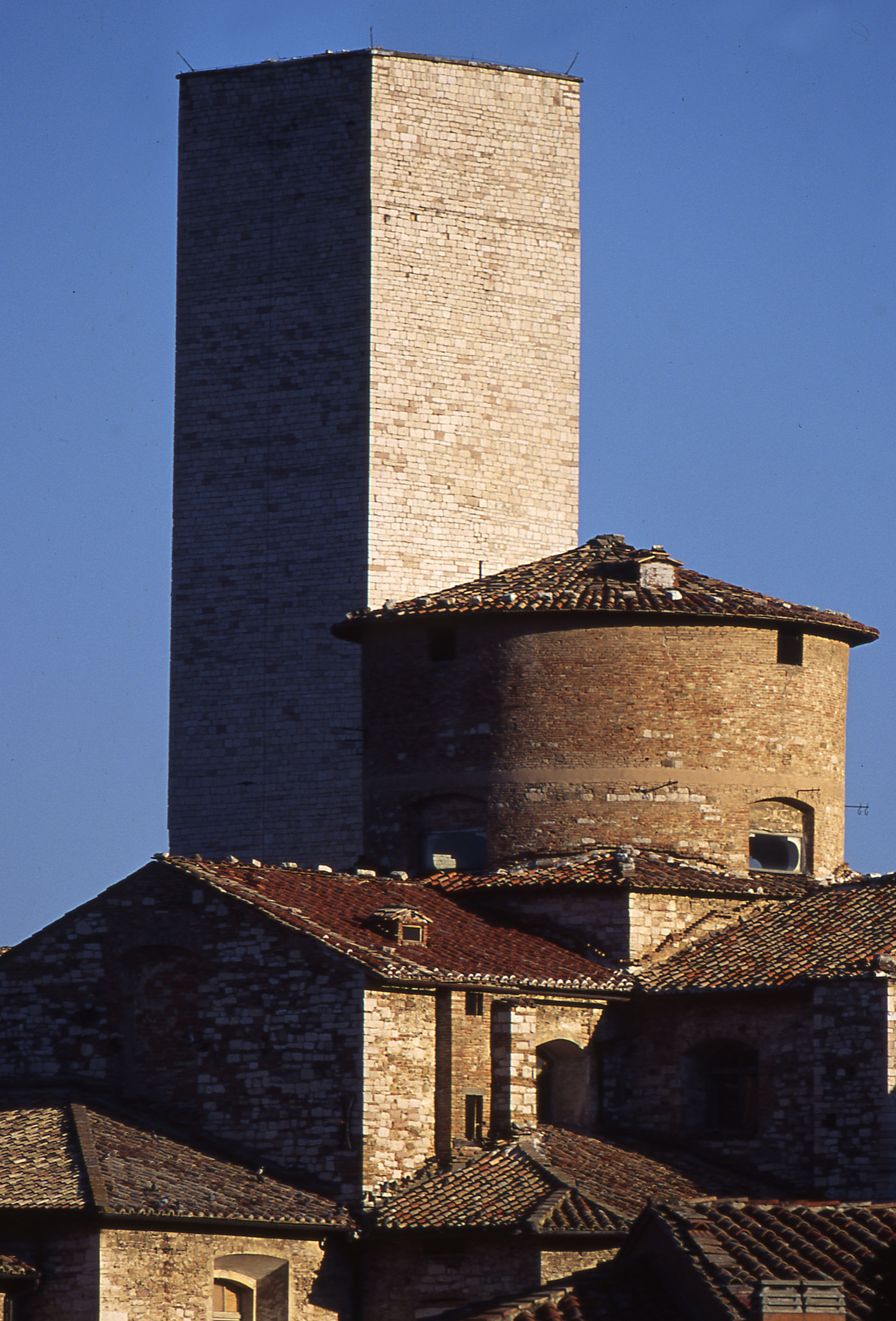
- Interactive map of Sciri tower
- Alternative names: Torre degli Scalzi

General information
- Architectural style: Medieval
- Location: Perugia, Via dei Priori, Italy
- Completed: XIII th century
- Height: 42 m

Website
- https://www.visitaperugia.it/torre-degli-sciri/

The Torre degli Sciri (English: Sciri Tower, or Tower of Scalzi), is a medieval tower dating back to the 13th century, located in Perugia, Italy. It stands in the historic district of Porta Santa Susanna, at the beginning of the Via dei Priori. Reaching a height of 42 meters, it is the last complete such tower remaining in the city.

== History ==
Originally, this structure was likely part of an ancient cluster of houses belonging to the noble Oddi clan. Only in the 16th century did it pass to the Sciri family, who lived in the houses below (the Sciri family became extinct in the 17th century). It is possible that the Sciri family took possession of the palace and tower after the defeat and expulsion of the Oddi family from Perugia by the Baglioni in 1488, with the Sciri family among those who supported them. The motivations to build such towers were as defensive fortifications and as expressions of prestige, wealth and power. The Oddi family may have had an additional impetus; they originally owned the castle of Pierle, on the border between Umbria and Tuscany. Having been compelled to relinquish Pierle, and having established themselves as part of the ruling elite in Perugia, it is possible that they wanted to replicate in an urban context the appearance of the castle they had surrendered. Pierle Castle retains, although partially collapsed, a very tall tower that could have been the model that inspired the builders of the original tower.

With the extinction of the Sciri family in the 17th century, the structure, which had passed into the ownership of Caterina della Penna, was donated by her to Sister Lucia Tartaglini of Cortona. In 1680, she founded the conservatory known as Suor Lucia. This institution welcomed orphaned girls of humble origins, willing to live a simple life of prayer and work according to the rule of the Franciscan Third Order. These nuns were called "becchette" by the people of Perugia, so the tower was also known as the "Tower of the Becchette." The name "Tower of the Scalzi" is derived from the convent of the Discalced Carmelites located in the adjacent church of St. Teresa. Subsequently, the Oblate Sisters of St. Philip Neri took over this conventual building, where they resided until a few years ago.

From October 24, 2011, restoration work was carried out on the tower, the church, and a portion of the residential building, resulting in a total of 12 housing units. The renovation of the tower was completed in January 2015.

The tower has been the subject of scientific investigation into the impact of earthquakes on masonry towers.

== Architecture and description ==
The tower stands 46 meters high and is constructed of limestone blocks. It is the only complete such tower remaining in the city. There are thought to have been around 50 such towers in the city at the height of its mediaeval importance. On the lintel of the door at the base of the tower, there is a heraldic shield with a crest composed of a rooster's leg, representing the emblem of the Sciri family. The shield is flanked by two capital letters, namely an "N" and an "I," which are believed to refer to Nicola Iacobi degli Sciri. Just above, to the right, there is a panel made of ceramic tiles depicting the Madonna on a throne, with the infant Jesus holding a goldfinch in his left hand. At the base of the votive image, the inscription reads "MATER DIVINÆ GRATIÆ ORA PRO NOBIS" (Mother of Divine Grace, pray for us).

== Gallery ==
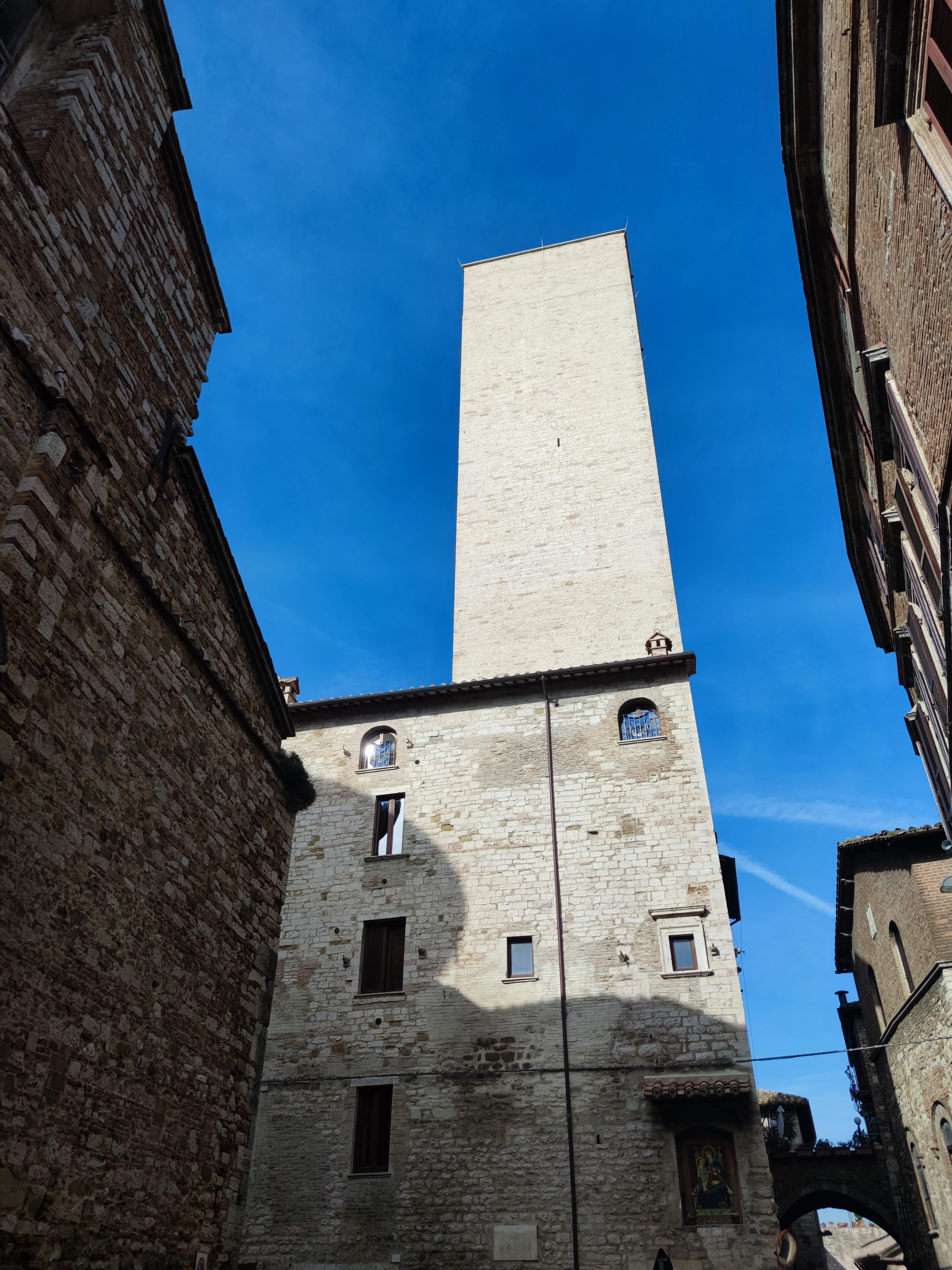
Sciri tower in 2022

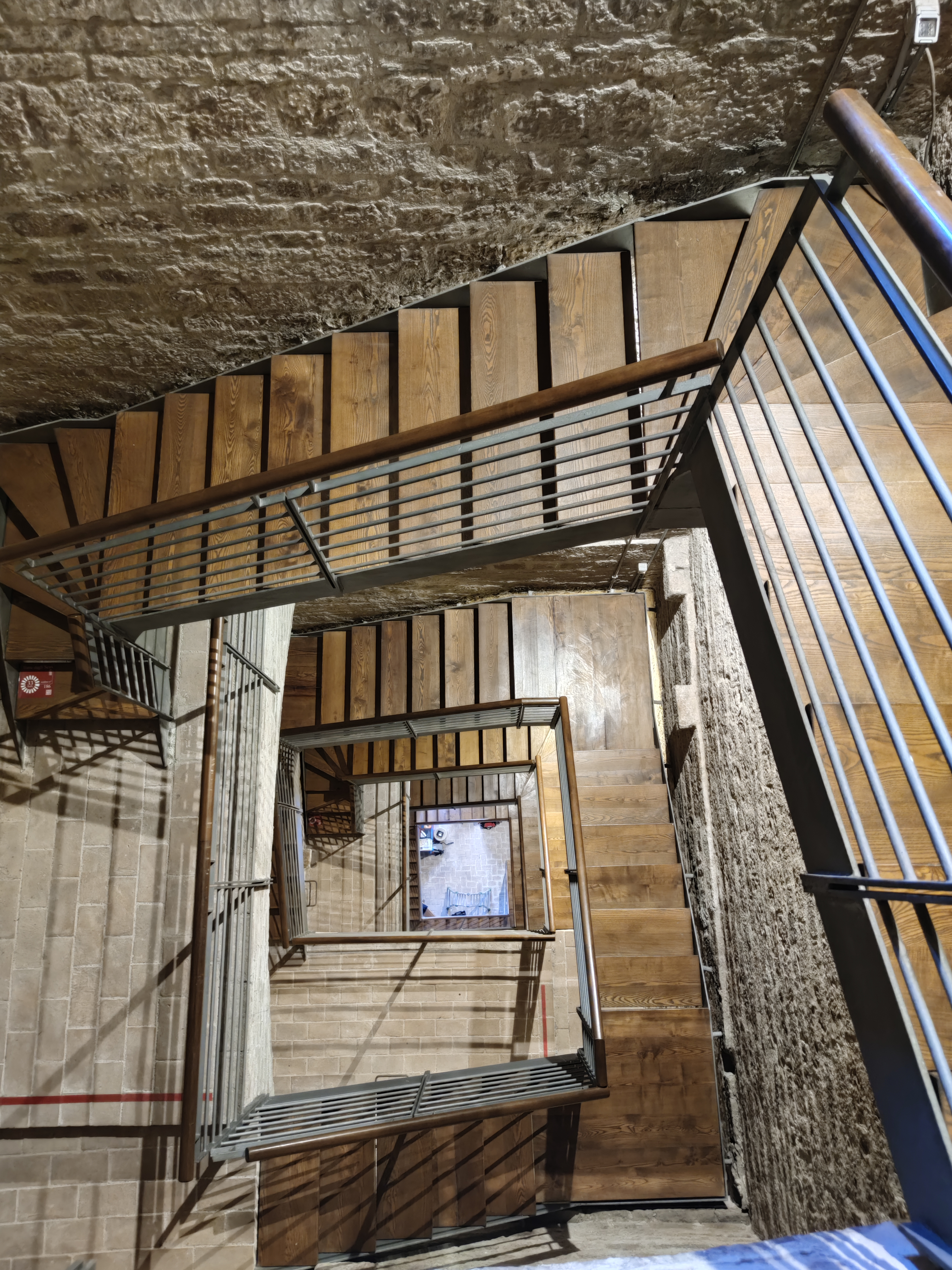
Inside the tower

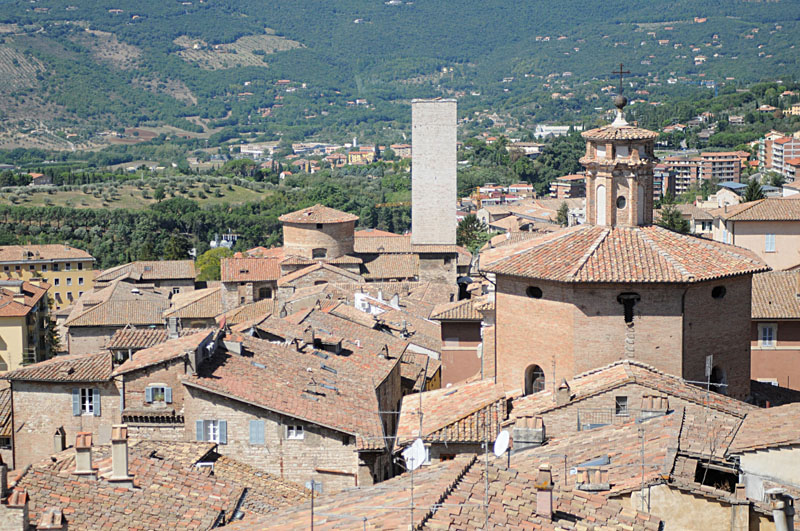

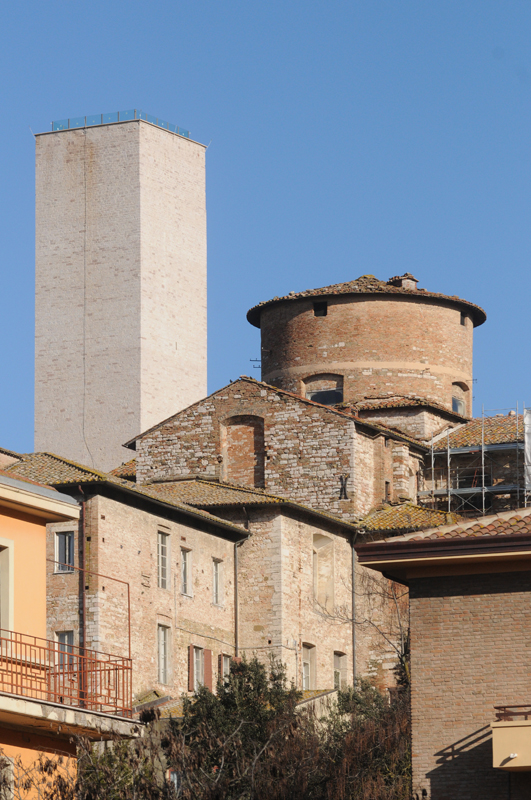

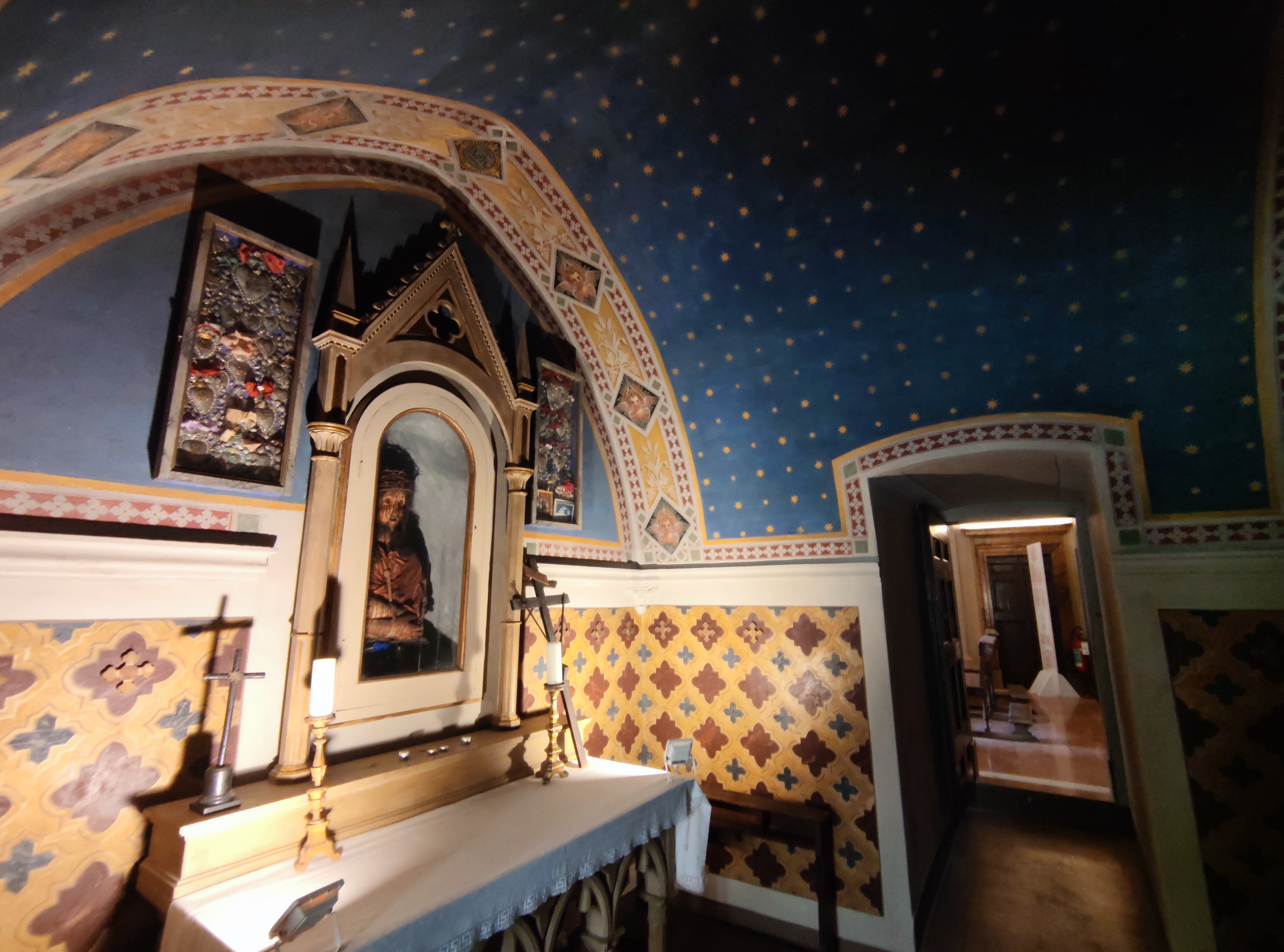

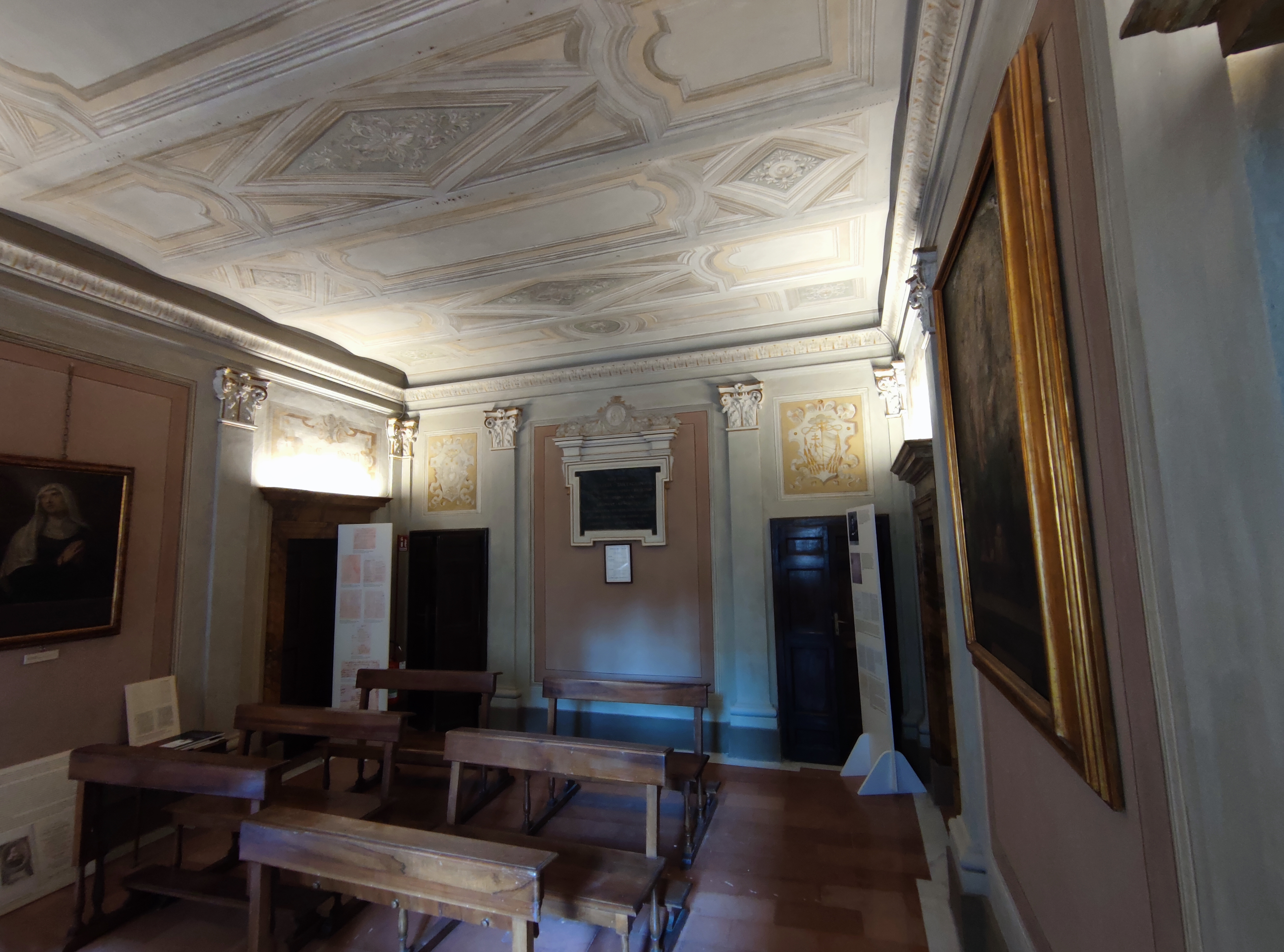

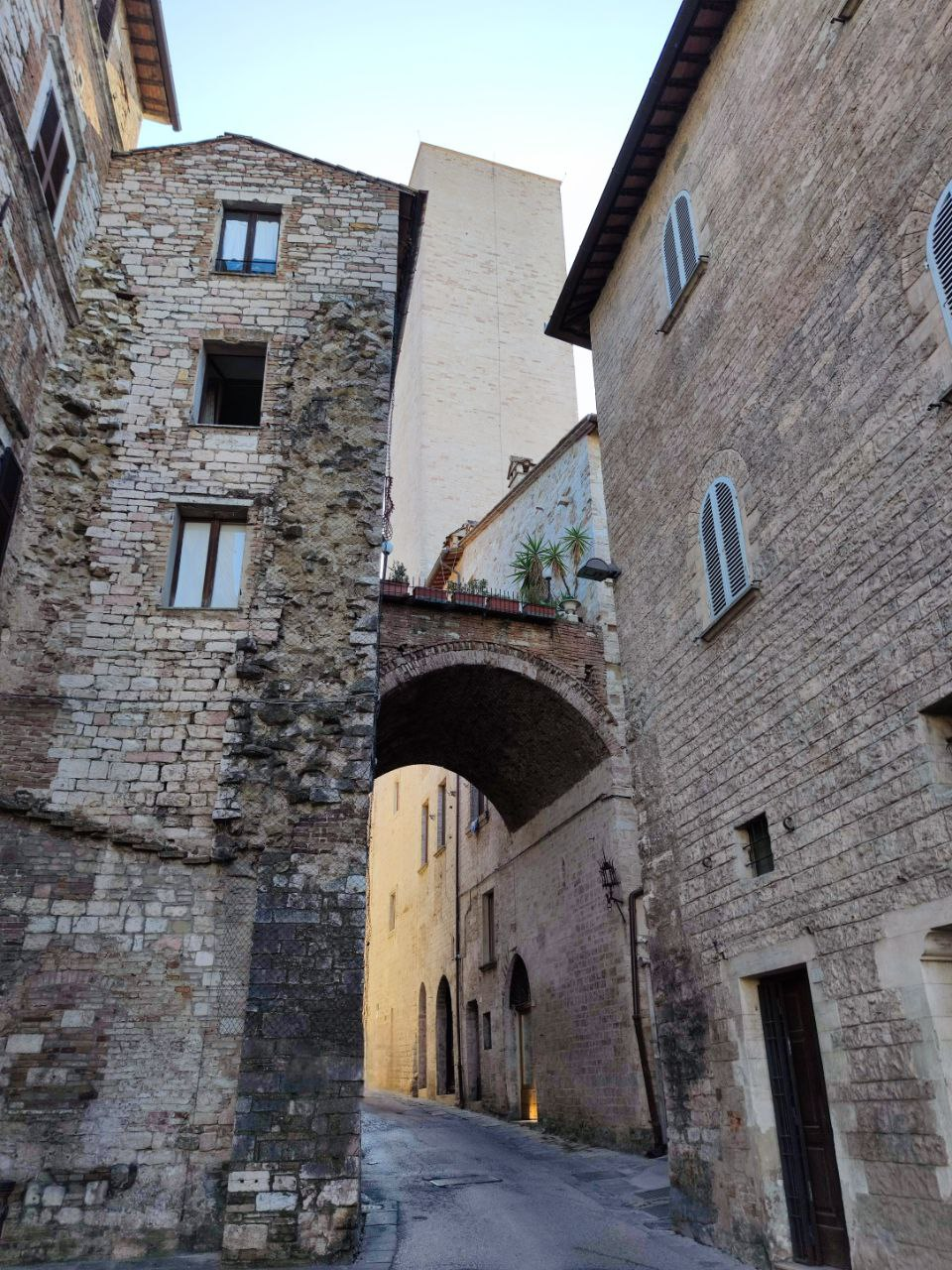
