= Siciliano =

Siciliano may refer to:

- Siciliana or siciliano (also known as sicilienne or ciciliano), a musical style or genre
- Siciliano (surname), surname
- Siciliano indigeno, breed of horse from Sicily
- Nero Siciliano, breed of domestic pig from Sicily

== See also ==
- Sicilian
- Sicilia (disambiguation)
- Sicily (disambiguation)
