= Cicely (disambiguation) =

Cicely is an herb, Myrrhis odorata

Cicely may also refer to:

- Osmorhiza, a genus of plants referred to as cicely in North America

== People ==
- Cicely Mary Barker (1895–1973), English illustrator of books, greeting cards, and postcards
- Cicely Carew (born 1982), American artist
- Dame Cicely Courtneidge (1893–1980), English actress, comedian, and Dame Commander of the Order of the British Empire (DBE); granddaughter of singer and actress Cicely Nott
- Cicely Hamilton (1872–1952), English actress, feminist, journalist, writer, and, most notably, suffragist
- Cicely Mayhew (1924–2016), first British woman diplomat
- Dame Cicely Saunders (1918–2005), English nurse, physician and writer, member of the Order of Merit and DBE
- Cicely Tyson (1924–2021), African-American actress known for The Autobiography of Miss Jane Pittman, Roots, and Diary of a Mad Black Woman
- Cicely Pearl Blair (1926–2005), British dermatologist

== Other ==
- Cicely, Alaska, the fictional setting of the television series Northern Exposure
- The Groovy Girls doll line, by Manhattan Toy, features a doll named Cicely.

== See also ==
- Cecily (disambiguation)
- Sicily (disambiguation)
