= Sicilia (surname) =

Sicilia is a surname. Notable people with the surname include:

- Gina Sicilia (born 1985), American singer, songwriter, and musician
- Gustavo Sáenz de Sicilia (1885 – 1950), a Mexican silent film director, producer, journalist, civil engineer, and founder of Compañía Nacional Productora de Películas
- Horacio Sicilia (born 1974), Argentine rower
- Javier Sicilia (born 1956), Mexican poet, essayist, novelist, peace activist and journalist
- Joan Enric Vives i Sicília (born 1949), Spanish cleric
- Joan Francesc Ferrer Sicilia (born 1970), Spanish former footballer
- José María Sicilia (born 1954), Spanish abstractionist painter
- Nina Sicilia (born 1962), Venezuelan model and beauty queen
- Pablo Sicilia (born 1981), Spanish former footballer
- Sam Sicilia (born 1986), American professional mixed martial artist

== See also ==
- Sicilia (disambiguation)
- Siciliano (surname)
