= Cecily =

Cecily is a feminine given name. It is an English form of the Latin name Cecilia, which is derived from the Roman Caecili family.

Notable people with the name include:

- Cecily Adams (1958–2004), American actress, casting director, and lyricist
- Cecily Bonville, 7th Baroness Harington (1460–1529), English peeress
- Cecily Brown (born 1969), British painter
- Cecily Lefort (1900–1945), British World War II agent
- Cecily Neville, Duchess of York (1415–1495), mother of two English kings
- Cecily Norden (1918–2011), South African author and equestrian
- Cecily Maude O'Connell (1884–1965) Australian trade unionist and religious social worker
- Cecily O'Neill, American theater educator
- Cecily Polson, Australian actress
- Cecily Rosol, Australian politician
- Cecily Sash (1924–2019), South African painter, professor
- Cecily Strong (born 1984), American actress and comedian
- Cecily Tynan (born 1969), Philadelphia broadcast personality
- Cecily of York (1469–1507), sister of King Edward V of England
- Cecily von Ziegesar (born 1970), American author of novels written for teenagers

== See also ==
- Cicely (disambiguation)
