= Sicily (disambiguation) =

Sicily is an island and region of Italy.

Sicily or may also refer to:

== History ==
- Sicilia (Roman province)
- Sicily (theme), the Byzantine province
- The Emirate of Sicily, a 10th-century Islamic state
- The Kingdom of Sicily, a medieval and early modern Italian kingdom (1130–1816)
- The Kingdom of Naples, an early modern Italian kingdom that called itself the Kingdom of Sicily (1282–1816)
- The Kingdom of the Two Sicilies, successor state to the Kingdom of Sicily and Kingdom of Naples (1816–1861)

== Places ==
- Sicily Bridge, a proposed bridge across the Strait of Messina
- Sicily, Illinois
- Sicily Island, Louisiana
- Sicily Township, Gage County, Nebraska

== Other uses ==
- Sicily Sewell, an American actress
- "Sicily", a poem written by John Petrozzi and later a song by The Wiggles from their Sailing Around the World album

== See also ==
- Sicilì, an Italian village in Campania
- Sicilia (disambiguation)
- Sicilian (disambiguation)
- Siciliano (disambiguation)
- Cicely (disambiguation)
