= Jean Vuaillat =

French poet

- Born: 1915; Lyon, France
- Died: 2009 (aged 93–94); Lyon, France
- Occupations: Poet, priest

Jean Vuaillat (1915–2009) was a French Roman Catholic priest, poet and biographer. He served as a priest in Lyon as well as small towns in the Loire and Rhône regions until he became a canon at the Lyon Cathedral in 1982. He published many poetry collections and several biographies. He won five literary prizes from the Académie française.

== Early life ==
Jean Vuaillat was born in 1915 in Lyon.

== Career ==
Vuaillat was ordained as a Roman Catholic priest in 1940. He served as a vicar in Givors near Lyon, and later at the Église Saint-Pierre de Vaise in Lyon. In the midst of World War II, in 1943, he served as a vicar to the Catholic youth in the Service du travail obligatoire in Germany. He subsequently published an account of his service in Poland entitled Ma vie en Pologne sous le IIIème Reich. At the end of the war, in 1945, he became the director of the Catholic school in Fourvière.

Vuaillat served as the vicar in Saint-Martin-en-Coailleux in the Loire region from 1950 to 1959. He was a vicar at the Basilica of St. Thérèse in Lisieux from 1959 to 1967, with a stint at Our Lady of Laus. He served as a vicar in Sainte-Catherine in the Rhône region from 1967 to 1982. Finally, he served as a canon at the Lyon Cathedral from 1982 to 1999.

Vuaillat was the founder and editor of Laudes, a journal, from 1967 to 2006.

Vuaillat published many poetry collections. He won five literary prizes from the Académie française: the Prix Véga et Lods de Wegmann for Solitude de neige in 1966; the Prix Archon-Despérouses for Douze psaumes in 1970; the Prix Marie Havez-Planque for Apprivoiser la mort in 1976; the Prix Capuran for Mariales et signets pour Noël in 1980; and the Prix François Coppée for Ciels d’arrière-saison in 1996.

Aside from poetry, Vuaillat authored the biographies of Saint Philip Neri as well as missionaries Jean-Pierre Néel and Benoît Berthet. He also published the biographies of composers Mozart and Gabriel Fauré.

Vuaillat was a significant book collector. He maintained a correspondence with Léopold Sédar Senghor, among many others.

== Death and legacy ==
Vuaillat died in 2009. He bequeathed half his book collection to the Bibliothèque municipale de Lyon; the other half was auctioned.

== Works ==
- Vuaillat, Jean (1942). Résonances : poèmes, 1932-1942. Lyon: Jean Vuaillat. OCLC 758745333.
- —— (1943). Collines du silence. Lyon: E. Vitte. OCLC 417576248.
- —— (1946). D'ombre et de soleil. Lyon: Éditions Penser vrai. OCLC 11061291.
- —— (1948). Accords mineurs. Lyon: J. Vuaillart. OCLC 417576254.
- —— (1953). Patrice. Saint-Etienne: Dumas. OCLC 373535671.
- —— (1957). Les Anges de midi. Lyon: Ed. I.G.S.E. OCLC 490212352.
- —— (1959). Wolfgang-Amédée Mozart. Lyon: Éditions et imprimeries du sud-est. OCLC 492055188.
- —— (1960). Sacerdotales: Le prêtre et sa messe. Rodez: Editions Subervie. OCLC 420154546.
- —— (1962). Eaux fortes et sanguines. Lyon: Éditions et imprimeries du sud-est. OCLC 420061638.
- —— (1964). Solitude de la neige. Rodez: Subervie. OCLC 35640918.
- —— (1967). Saint Philippe Néri : le saint toujours joyeux. Lyon: Éditions et imprimeries du Sud-Est. OCLC 460693224.
- —— (1967). Miroirs de ton amour. Aurillac: Éditions Gerbert. OCLC 490232969.
- —— (1969). Douze psaumes. Lyon: Laudes. OCLC 77302091.
- —— (1970). Exégèse de la nuit. Rodez: Editions Subervie.
- —— (1972). L'argile et le feu. Aurillac: Éditions Gerbert.
- —— (1973). Gabriel Fauré. Lyon: Vitte. OCLC 643853086.
- —— (1975). Apprivoiser la mort. Aurillac: Éditions Gerbert. OCLC 3480165.
- —— (1977). Chemins. Aurillac: Éditions Gerbert. OCLC 4882806.
- —— (1978). Mariales, suivi de Signets pour Noël. OCLC 5414447.
- —— (1979). Ligne de crête. Condé-sur-Noireau: Editions du Chemin Corlet. OCLC 406757818.
- —— (1981). Jean Pierre Néel, martyr et bienheureux, 1832-1862. Aurillac: Éditions Gerbert. OCLC 9324505.
- —— (1983). Mémoires du sablier. Rodez: Jean Vuaillat. OCLC 417775158.
- —— (1984). Benoît Berthet : en religion le R.P. Marie-Dominique... : un missionnaire à La Trinidad. Aurillac: Éditions Gerbert. OCLC 417594125.
- —— (1986). Bestiaire alphabétique : vingt six poèmes. Aurillac: Gerbert. OCLC 461820343.
- —— (1988). Alphabet de Noël : XXV poèmes inédits. Aurillac: Éditions Gerbert. OCLC 417066411.
- —— (1989). Le Miel du silence : poèmes : 1984-1989. Aurillac: Éditions Gerbert. OCLC 417573772.
- —— (1991). Fleurilège : pour fêter cinquante années en poésie. Lyon: Jean Vuaillat. OCLC 417573662.
- —— (1993). Regards obliques sur la ville. Lyon: Laudes. OCLC 414871283.
- —— (1994). Alphabet du bibliophile. Lyon: Jean Vuaillat. OCLC 417238710.
- —— (1995). Ciels d'arrière-saison. Lyon: Laudes. OCLC 407659977.
- —— (1997). Douze poèmes pour les douze mois de l'année. Lyon: Jean Vuaillat. OCLC 492946925.
- —— (1998). Souvenirs : quinze poèmes de circonstance : 1933-1995. Lyon: Jean Vuaillat. OCLC 421707427.
- —— (2000). Alphabet des gastronomes. Aurillac: Gerbert. OCLC 491284014.
- —— (2002). Les cailloux du Petit Poucet : cinquante-quatre poèmes semés de 1976 à 2001. Aurillac: Gerbert. OCLC 469702835.
- —— (2003). Au jardin du bonheur : des fruits, des bêtes et des fleurs. Aurillac: Gerbert. OCLC 469546125.
- ——. Ma vie en Pologne sous le IIIème Reich. OCLC 420252960.
