= Cecil Jospé =

American painter (1928–2004)

- Born: Cecil Joan Weiner; August 15, 1928; New Jersey, United States
- Died: May 17, 2004 (aged 75); London, England, United Kingdom
- Education: Radcliffe College
- Occupations: Photographer, watercolorist
- Spouse: Roger Jospé (m. 1958)
- Children: 3

Cecil Jospé (née Weiner; August 15, 1928 – May 17, 2004) was an American photographer and watercolorist. A bachelor of arts graduate in art history and the theory and practice and drawing and painting from Harvard University's Radcliffe College, she exhibited her work in photography at The Photographers' Gallery. Jospé was elected a member of the Chelsea Art Club, the Royal Watercolour Society, the New English Art Club and exhibited her art work at the latter two societies.

== Biography ==
She was born Cecil Weiner on August 15, 1928, in New Jersey. She was given the name Cecil after her aunt, Cecil Mosbacher (1934): First female judge in Alameda County, California (1951). Her artistic career commenced in the late 1940s when she was educated at Harvard University's Radcliffe College, where she read art history and the theory and practice of drawing and painting. Jospé graduated with a Bachelor of Arts degree in 1951. She lived in New York in the early 1950 and was a representational painter when abstract expressionists emerged within the art world.

She married the Belgian Roger Jospé in 1957 in Connecticut, then moved to Brussels and relocated to London 15 years later, in 1972. Jospé's marriage and the birth of her three children stopped her from working as a creative artist until she enrolled on a part-time degree in professional photography at the Polytechnic of Central London (now the University of Westminster). She learnt how to print color transparencies and was intrigued in 5x4 camera technology. Jospé used the skills she learnt to photograph her life as a housewife and mother over the past quarter of a century; her obituarist in The Times described them as "icons of domesticity with an undercurrent of irony" and "profoundly personal and psychologically eerie."

Jospé held solo exhibitions of her work at The Photographers' Gallery in Great Newport Street, London in 1983 and 1985. She also considered training as a psychologist and was the Analytical Psychology Club of London's secretary, for which she designed a club logo and letterhead. Between 1985 and 1997 Jospé went to classes at the Slade School of Fine Art in the belief she would help other professional art bodies, and was mentioned in the Richard Platt's The Ultimate Photo Data Guide in 1989 for her work on a French phrasebook.

Eventually, she ceased to work in photography and returned to her first interest of painting; she focused mainly on watercolours. In 1992, Jospé underwent an operation for cancer and was able to continue painting for as long as she could. She was elected to the Chelsea Art Club, the Royal Watercolour Society in 2001, and the New English Art Club two years later. Jospé was a regular exhibitor at the latter two societies with studies on ponies, purple buds, and white flowers put on a dark background. She died in London on May 17, 2004. The New English Art Club named the Cecil Jospé Prize after her. It is awarded to "members to the work of a non-members."

== Personality ==
Simon Fenwick in The Independent described her as "stylish and articulate" and said several prominent members of the Analytical Psychology Club of London entertained by her family at her home. Her obituarist in The Times noted Jospé was attracted to "an aesthetic of precision, order and simplicity" in a desire "to learn when to stop and how not to over-elaborate or take a picture too far into the realm of the overwrought and fussy."
