= Cecilia Cacabelos =

Argentine student and enforced disappearance

- Born: Cecilia Inés Cacabelos De La Flor; 25 November 1958
- Disappeared: 11 October 1976; Buenos Aires, Argentina
- Occupation: High school student

Cecilia Inés Cacabelos De La Flor (25 November 1958; disappeared 11 October 1976) was an Argentine student kidnapped by security forces on 11 October 1976 during the country's last military dictatorship.

== Disappearance ==
Cacabelos was detained at the age of 17 by armed men, along with her brother José, while she was in a coffee shop on the Dorrego and Corrientes streets in Buenos Aires. Both were later transferred to the clandestine detention center of the Navy Petty-Officers School (ESMA).

Her case was mentioned during the final indictment of the Trial of the Juntas in 1985 by deputy prosecutor Luis Moreno Ocampo.

On 29 June 2013, a commemorative tile in honor of Cecilia was placed at Avenida Corrientes 6195, in the neighborhood of Chacarita.
