= Cecilia Gillie =

English radio executive (1907–1996)

- Born: Cecilia Grace Hunt Reeves; 17 August 1907; Sheerness, Kent, England
- Died: 20 April 1996 (aged 88); Warsaw, Poland
- Citizenship: United Kingdom
- Education: King Edward VI High School for Girls; Newnham College, Cambridge
- Occupation: Radio executive
- Years active: 1933–1972
- Spouse: Darsie Gillie (m. 1955; died 1972)

Cecilia Grace Hunt Gillie (née Reeves; 17 August 1907 – 20 April 1996) was an English radio executive for the BBC. She joined the BBC Foreign Liaison Office in 1933 and had her first foreign assignment in establishing the BBC Paris Office six years later. Gillie was appointed the BBC French Service's senior talks assistant in 1940 and became head of the BBC European Liaison Office towards the end of the Second World War. From 1947 to 1967, she served as the BBC's Paris representative, and assisted senior members Robin Scott and Noble Wilson on radio matters.

== Early life ==
Gillie was born Cecilia Grace Hunt Reeves to the naval engineer Albert Robert Reeves and his wife Ella, née Hunt, on 18 August 1907, at Alma Road, Sheerness, the Isle of Sheppey, Kent. She was raised in Birmingham and taught at King Edward VI High School for Girls. Gillie enrolled at Newnham College, Cambridge and graduated with a degree in modern languages.

== Career ==
In 1933, she joined the BBC Foreign Liaison Office, which had been recently formed at the time, and was made assistant to the foreign liaison officer Richard Marriott. During these duties, Gillie became especially worried with the arrangements of Edward R. Murrow, the CBS network's European director, with the two becoming close friends. She arranged from Broadcasting House for the uncensored broadcast of Murrow's report on Adolf Hitler's Anschluss to the United States in March 1938. Gillie had her first assignment abroad when she assisted Marriott in establishing the BBC's Paris Office in 1939. The two worked in Paris during the Phoney War period of the Second World War, but returned to London in mid-1940 after the Battle of France.

Gillie was appointed the BBC French Service's senior talks assistant and attempted to form a team of French broadcasters to contribute to the programme Les Francais Parlent aux Francais (English: The French Speak to the French) to control the expansion of the service necessitated by Nazi German control of French broadcasting. Peter Pooley, the creator of Radio Newsreel and theatre expert, consulted her and told her the stage director Michel Saint-Denis, was in England awaiting repatriation to France after the French Army demobbed him. Gillie persuaded Pooley Saint-Denis would be more useful in broadcasting. She worked as talks assistant, producer of the programme and mentored those working on it. By the war's conclusion, she had become the head of the BBC European Liaison Office in London, and was appointed the BBC's Paris representative in 1947.

In the early post-war era, Gillie assisted Documentation française in giving a full account of the BBC French Service's contribution to the war effort, which went unpublished but was stored at the BBC Written Archives Centre in Caversham. She oversaw an increased interest in French cultural life on BBC Radio, mainly the BBC Third Programme giving the French a platform to be heard on. Gillie provided BBC Radio's current affairs and talk programmes with French experts who were fluent in English. Gillie left her post in 1958, when Robin Scott was appointed a representative in an era that saw an increased interest in television. She assisted Scott and fellow senior BBC staff member Noble Wilson on radio matters.

In July 1962, Gillie was a producer on the BBC Third Programme production The French on the French, and appeared on the BBC Home Service programme Woman's Hour three years later to discuss her life in wartime with the writer Flora Groult. She retired from the BBC in April 1967, and moved to Mirabeau, Vaucluse near to river Durance. Gillie taught herself cooking and authored a cookery book. She also taught English in the local area, earning the nickname "La Dame Anglaise". As she was about to be filmed at length by BBC Television Archives for an interview on 20 April 1986, she had a major stroke, which made it difficult for her to communicate and incapacitated her. Gillie was cared for by a friend from Poland, and she had more strokes that almost rendered her unable to speak.

== Personal life ==
Gillie was married to the broadcaster and correspondent Darsie Rutherford Gillie from 1955 until his death from illness in 1972. She was cared for by an old Polish friend and staff he found for her home in France. In 1995, Gillie was transported by plane on a stretcher to Warsaw, where she died on 20 April 1996. After being cremated, Gillie' ashes were scattered over the English Channel.
