= Robert Siciliano =

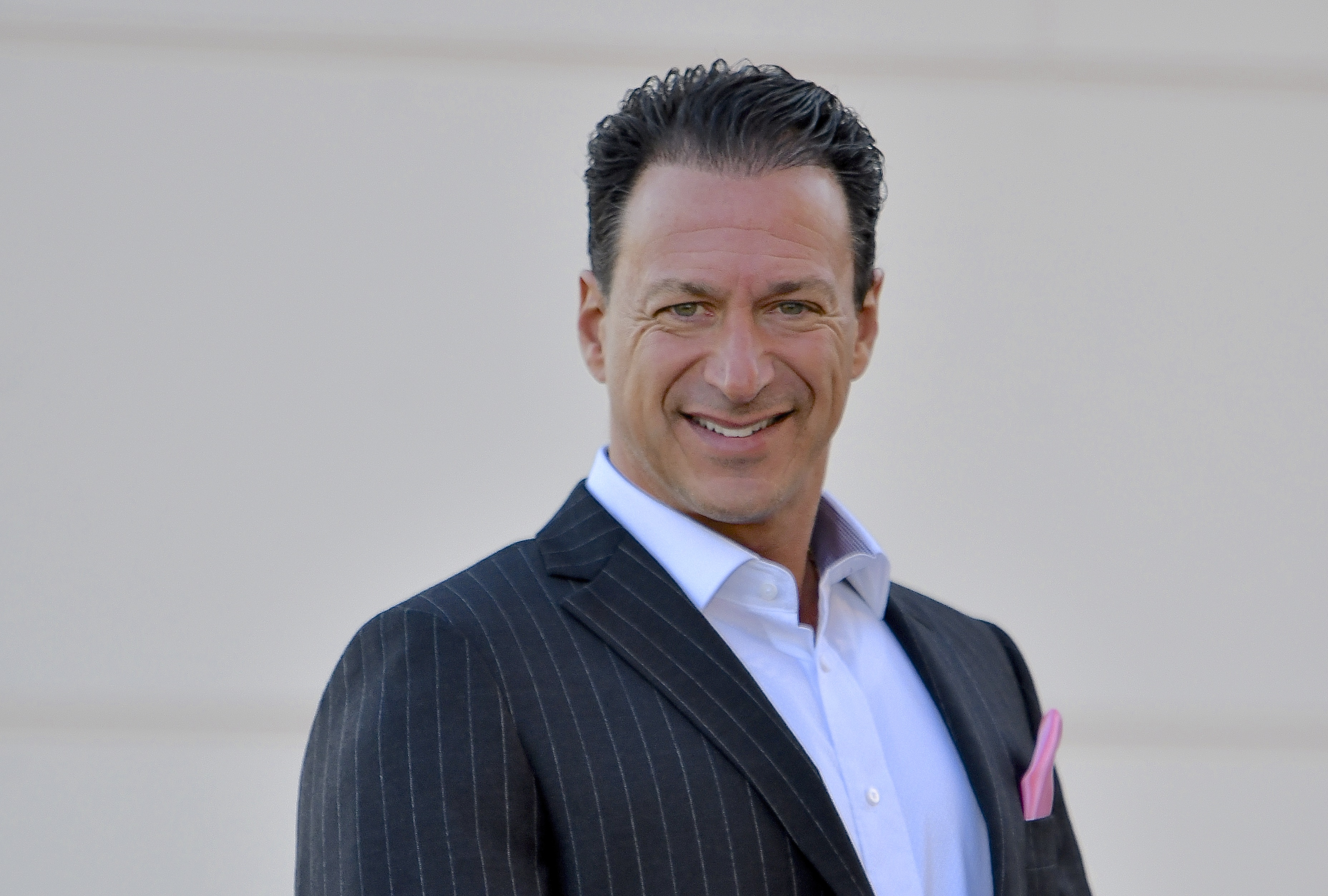
- Self-portrait photograph
- Born: May 25, 1968 (age 58)
- Occupations: Author, Security Analyst
- Notable work: “Identity Theft Privacy” (2018), “The Safety Minute” (2003)
- Website: safr.me

Robert Siciliano (born May 25, 1968) is an American security analyst, author and media personality. He delivers presentations throughout the United States and Canada on identity theft protection and personal security, including self-defense.

Siciliano has appeared on United States–based television programming such as The Today Show, Anderson Cooper 360°, CNN, MSNBC, Fox News, CNBC, Inside Edition, Tyra Banks Show, Sally Jesse Show, Montel Williams, Maury Povich Show, Gayle King Show and the Howard Stern Show. In addition, he has been quoted in American news print publications such as USA Today, Forbes, Cosmopolitan, Good Housekeeping, The New York Times, Los Angeles Times, Washington Times, Chicago Tribune, Boston Globe, and Entrepreneur. Siciliano serves on the board of directors for the Identity Theft Resource Center, contributes to the Realtor Safety Initiative Team for Realtor Safety Week, and is a regular keynote speaker at security-related events.

== Life and career ==
Robert Siciliano grew up in and around Boston, Massachusetts. Robert earned his certification in Private Investigations from Boston University, as well as his certificate as a Certified Speaking Professional from the NSA (National Speakers Association). For the last 20+ years, Siciliano has been refining his rhetoric, content, message to carry out his mission of informing the public on the issues and solutions surrounding security issues.

Talk show host Montel Williams was the first to broadcast Siciliano nationally. Show producers worked with Siciliano to develop scenarios where he would socially engineer his way into resident's homes in Elizabethtown, New Jersey, posing as a utility worker.

After the September 11 attacks, Siciliano provided commentary as a news correspondent in regards to many security issues such as school shootings, workplace violence, privacy issues, child abductions, and travel security.

In September 2009, Siciliano conducted an experiment that tested the ease of buying and deploying a retail ATM and as a result raised a few eyebrows in the ATM industry. He was able to purchase an ATM for US$750.00 on Craigslist.org, then program and deploy the retail ATM without any red tape or paperwork registration.

On April 15, 2013, Siciliano ran the 117th edition of the mass-participation Boston Marathon as a charity runner for Boston Children's Hospital. Roberts experience during the bombing was chronicled by the Boston Globe.

=== Keynotes ===
- The Western States Director Education Foundation Symposium
- National Association of Credit Managers
- Massachusetts Association of Realtors
- Industrial Asset Management Council
- Meetings Professionals International
- Louisiana State University
- United Bankers Bank
- Tools of the Trade REALTOR Expo
- Parady Financial
- National Association of Realtors
- Michigan Credit Union League
- Global Business Travel Association
- Realtors Triple Play

== Books authored ==
Siciliano is the author of five books:

1. Siciliano, Robert. The Safety Minute: How To Be Safe In The Streets At Home And Abroad So You Can Save Your Life! 1996. SafetyZone Press. Boston, MA. ISBN 0-9648126-2-2
2. Siciliano, Robert. The Safety Minute: Living On High Alert; How To Take Control Of Your Personal Security And Prevent Fraud. 2003. SafetyZone Press. Boston, MA. ISBN 0-9648126-7-3
3. Siciliano, Robert. 99 Things You Wish You Knew Before Your Identity Was Stolen. 2011. McAfee. Florida, NY. ASIN B0060GBP8Y
4. Siciliano, Robert. 99 Things You Wish You Knew Before Your Mobile Device Was Hacked. 2012. McAfee. Florida, NY. ISBN 1937801195
5. Siciliano, Robert. Identity Theft Privacy. 2018. Tross Consulting. Tempe, AZ. ISBN 978-0-9969500-8-4.

He has also contributed to the development of five other books, including ones such as Protect your business against threats internally and externally and Riches In Niches, How to make it big in a small market.
