= Cecilia LW Chan =

Chinese social scientist

Cecilia LW Chan is a Chinese social scientist, currently the Si Yuan Professor in Health and Social Work at University of Hong Kong.
