= Sille (given name) =

The name Sille is a female (occasionally male) name, that is mainly used in Scandinavia. The name is a shortening of Cecilie, a variant of Cecilia (a female version of the Roman name Caecilius), and from Sylvester.

People with the name include:

- Sille Lundquist (1970–2018), Danish fashion model and author
- Sille Struck (born 1998), Danish football player
- Sille Thomsen (born 1992), Danish handball player
