= Francesco Danieli =

Italian historian, iconologist and painter

Francesco Danieli (1981 in Nardò) is an Italian historian, iconologist, art critic and painter.

== Life and activities ==
He is known for his work on art and faith in Tridentine Italy and his study on Philip Neri and his aesthetic experience. Danieli studied Philosophy, Theology, Archaeology, Art and History in Naples and Rome. He is Editor of Gli Argonauti, series of publications by Edizioni Universitarie Romane (Rome). and he is also Director of the magazine Krínomai. Rivista italiana di storia e critica delle Arti (Milan). He has been involved in various international research projects and conferences. His publication record includes books, essays, reviews, and newspaper columns; he has also painted a number of coffee watercolors.

== Selected bibliography ==
- S. Francesco d’Assisi in un codice bizantino del sec. XV, Galatina, Congedo, 2005.
- Il mistero dei segni, Galatina, Congedo, 2007.
- La freccia e la palma. San Sebastiano fra storia e pittura con 100 capolavori dell’arte, Rome, Edizioni Universitarie Romane, 2007.
- Laudario dei semplici, Rome, Edizioni Universitarie Romane, 2008.
- San Filippo Neri. La nascita dell’Oratorio e lo sviluppo dell’arte cristiana al tempo della riforma, Cinisello Balsamo, San Paolo, 2009.
- Fasti e linguaggi sacri. Il barocco leccese tra riforma e controriforma, Lecce, Grifo, 2014.
- Casaranello and its mosaic. Per aspera ad astra, Monteroni di Lecce, Esperidi, 2018.
- A Journey of the Soul. Catharsis and Salvation in the Mosaic of Casaranello (Italy, 6th Century), in American Journal of Art and Design. Vol. 6, No. 3, New York, 2021, pp. 84-94.
- Echi danteschi e onirismo fiammingo in un dipinto di Donato Antonio D'Orlando (1562-1622), Rome, Edizioni Universitarie Romane, 2022.
- Cristoforo Solari detto 'Il Gobbo' e il suo 'Cristo alla colonna'. Uno scalpello archetipico del Rinascimento nel Duomo di Milano, in Krínomai. Rivista italiana di storia e critica delle Arti, I, n. 2, Milan 2025, pp. 51-62.
