= Danieli (disambiguation) =

Danieli is an Italian supplier of equipment and physical plants to the metal industry.

Danieli may also refer to:

- Danieli (surname)
- Danieli Haloten (born 1980), Brazilian journalist, actress and lecturer
- Danieli Piuma, a family of Italian high-wing, strut-braced, pusher configuration single-seat motor gliders
- Hotel Danieli, formerly Palazzo Dandolo, is a five-star palatial hotel in Venice, Italy
- Ædes Danielis, a heritage residence in Zejtun, Malta.

== See also ==
- Daniel (disambiguation)
