= Sicilian =

Sicilian refers to the Italian island of Sicily.

Sicilian can also refer to:

- Sicilian language, a Romance language spoken on the island of Sicily, its satellite islands, and southern Calabria
- Sicilians, people from or with origins in Sicily
- Sicilian Defence, a chess opening
- The Sicilian, a 1984 novel by Mario Puzo
- The Sicilian (film), a 1987 action film based on the novel

== See also ==
- Caecilian, an order of amphibians, occasionally pronounced Sicilian
- Sicily (disambiguation)
- Siciliano (disambiguation)
