= Cecilia Amoafowaa Sefa =

Ghanaian writer, poet, and educator

- Born: c. 1983; Kwahu, Eastern Region, Ghana
- Education: Kwame Nkrumah University of Science and Technology; University for Development Studies
- Occupations: Writer, poet, teacher
- Writing career
- Notable works: Poetry Excursion on an African Mind, Secondary Rhythms

Cecilia Amoafowaa Sefa (born c. 1983) is a Ghanaian writer, poet and educator. She is known for her published poetry collections and contributions to contemporary Ghanaian literature. Her work has been used in university curricula and she is involved in advocacy efforts for children with special needs.

== Early life and education ==
Cecilia Amoafowaa Sefa was born in Kwahu in the Eastern Region of Ghana. She earned a Bachelor of Arts degree in English Language from the Kwame Nkrumah University of Science and Technology (KNUST) and later studied at the University for Development Studies where she prepared for a teaching career.

== Career ==
Sefa works professionally as a high school English teacher at Tamale Senior High School in northern Ghana. In addition to her work in education, she is active in literary circles and community outreach.

She is the President of the Autism Help Foundation (AHF), an organization focused on supporting individuals with neurodevelopmental conditions and their families.

Sefa has published at least two book-length works of poetry and prose.

== Personal life ==
Sefa maintains a personal online presence through writing and blogs where she shares poetry, essays and reflections on culture and society. She is active in promoting reading and writing among young people and advocates for social causes such as autism awareness.

== Selected works ==
- Poetry Excursion on an African Mind – her first poetry collection, which was selected for study in a course on Female Writers of Africa at KNUST.
- Secondary Rhythms – a book that explores the experiences of young people and social themes.
