= Sainte-Cécile =

Sainte-Cécile may refer to:

- Sainte Cécile de Rome, Catholic Saint

== Places in France ==
- Sainte-Cécile, Indre, a commune in the Indre department
- Sainte-Cécile, Manche, a commune in the Manche department
- Sainte-Cécile, Saône-et-Loire, a commune in the Saône-et-Loire department
- Sainte-Cécile, Vendée, a commune in the Vendée department

== Other places ==
- Sainte-Cécile, Belgium, a village in the Luxembourg province of Belgium
- Sainte-Cécile, New Brunswick, a community in Canada
  - Ste. Cecile, a local service district containing the community
