= Cecile Platovsky =

American fashion designer

- Cecile Platovsky
- Born: Antwerp, Belgium
- Occupations: Fashion Designer and former President Tricots St. Raphael

Cecile Platovsky, a designer, was raised in Belgium, before moving to New York City, where she began Tricots St. Raphael, the menswear company in 1974. She is often cited as one of the most notable people in fashion, in addition to a sweater "maverick" and "doyenne".

She helped change the movement of women in the fashion industry, along with Donna Karan and Liz Claiborne.

== Awards ==
Tricots St. Raphael was awarded the "Partners in Excellence Awards" in 1995. Tricots was selected from among 35,000 companies doing business with Nordstrom at the time. "The three companies selected exceeded our expectations in each of the judging categories: quality, value, service, partnership and business ethics," said John Whitacre, Nordstrom co-president at the time.

== Business life ==
Platovsky founded Tricots St. Raphael, a menswear company that manufactures sweaters, mostly out of Uruguay, in 1973. Growing up with a family in the textile industry in Belgium, Cecile was very familiar with fashion at a young age, and in a 2009 interview she said, "I have always wanted to design clothes" since I was young. Cecile said she wanted to "make sweaters for traditional people that wanted to be fashionable". When Cecile decided to start Tricots, she felt that Uruguay was the place to start, because they were well known for being a wool producing country, and "I figured if they produce wool, there must be factories". When she arrived in Montevideo, she knew one name through a relative and asked if he would like to manufacture menswear. When he agreed, the ecstatic Cecile began Tricots. While in Uruguay, Cecile stayed in the resort town of Punte del Este. She was so taken with the country and the places she had been that she named her company after her favorite hotel in Montevideo, The Hotel St. Raphael. She added "Tricots" which means "knitwear" in French.

After designing her first line, she brought a few samples to a gentlemen she had met in New York. When he looked at the samples he said, "these are great, you should take part in a menswear fashion show next week". In her first day, she sold 8,000 sweaters. Later she tells Snyder, "I had a feeling that someone was watching over me."

Later that year, she received a call from the Neiman Marcus seller in Paris, he said "I cannot come to New York, but heard great things about your line and would love to see it, can you come and meet me in Dallas?" This was well before Tricots had a travel budget, so Cecile took the gamble and flew down to Dallas. On the spot Neiman Marcus made an order for $80,000 and put Tricots on the map. Tricots continued to grow and began selling to many better retail stores such as, Nordstrom, Saks Fifth Avenue and Lord and Taylor.

In an interview discussing her career she said:

"I worked very hard for 32 years, six days a week, but looking back I had a ball"

As the company grew, so did potential buyers, and in December 2000, Tricots was purchased by Salant Corp. Platovsky continued to run the division. After 32 years in the business, Platovsky stepped down from the helm in July 2004.

== Personal life ==
Cecile has three children and lives on the Upper West Side. Her son Ronald was the Vice President of Tricots before she sold it in 2004.
