= Cecilia Moens =

Canadian developmental biologist

Cecilia Moens is a Canadian developmental biologist. Moens is part of the faculty at the Fred Hutchinson Cancer Research Center in Seattle, Washington, where she researches the vertebrate brain using zebrafish as a model organism.

== Early life ==
Moens was born and raised in Toronto, Canada. From a young age, Moens worked in the laboratory of her father, Peter Moens, a biology professor at York University; she would prepare agar plates and solutions and later performed electron microscopy. She decided to study developmental biology after she saw a time-lapse film of a chick embryo's development, set to the Egmont Overture, during her high school biology class.

== Education and career ==
Moens studied at York University, where she initially worked in her father's laboratory and later studied environmental carcinogens in the laboratory of Barry Glickman. After she completed her Bachelor of Science in 1987, she spent a year at Harvard University in the U.S. before beginning a PhD in molecular and medical genetics at the University of Toronto. Her research, supervised by Janet Rossant, concerned the development of mouses; she earned her PhD in 1993.

Moens became a postdoctoral fellow in the laboratory of Charles Kimmel at the University of Oregon, where her work involved searching for genes that controlled the development of hindbrain neurons. In 1998, she joined the faculty at the Fred Hutchinson Cancer Research Center in Seattle, Washington, within their Basic Sciences Division. She runs a laboratory that studies the development of the vertebrate brain, using the zebrafish as a model organism. She is also an affiliate faculty member in the University of Washington Department of Biology.

== Awards and honors ==
- Human Frontier Science Program Long-Term Fellowship (1994-1996)
- U.S. Presidential Early Career Award for Scientists and Engineers (2000)
- Howard Hughes Medical Institute Investigator (2000-2012)

== Selected publications ==
- Houwing, S; Kamminga, LM; Berezikov, E; Cronembold, D; Girard, A; van den Elst, H; Filippov, DV; Blaser, H; Raz, E; Moens, CB; Plasterk, RH; Hannon, GJ; Draper, BW; Ketting, RF (April 6, 2007). "A role for Piwi and piRNAs in germ cell maintenance and transposon silencing in Zebrafish". Cell. 129 (1): 69–82. doi:10.1016/j.cell.2007.03.026. hdl:11858/00-001M-0000-0012-E169-6. PMID 17418787. S2CID 13373509.
- Tobin, DM; Vary JC, Jr; Ray, JP; Walsh, GS; Dunstan, SJ; Bang, ND; Hagge, DA; Khadge, S; King, MC; Hawn, TR; Moens, CB; Ramakrishnan, L (March 5, 2010). "The lta4h locus modulates susceptibility to mycobacterial infection in zebrafish and humans". Cell. 140 (5): 717–30. doi:10.1016/j.cell.2010.02.013. PMC 2907082. PMID 20211140.
- Moens, Cecilia B.; Selleri, Licia (March 2006). "Hox cofactors in vertebrate development". Developmental Biology. 291 (2): 193–206. doi:10.1016/j.ydbio.2005.10.032. PMID 16515781.
- Prince, VE; Moens, CB; et al. (February 1998). "Zebrafish hox genes: expression in the hindbrain region of wild-type and mutants of the segmentation gene, valentino". Development. 125 (3): 393–406. doi:10.1242/dev.125.3.393. PMID 9425135.
- Monk, KR; Naylor, SG; Glenn, TD; Mercurio, S; Perlin, JR; Dominguez, C; Moens, CB; Talbot, WS (September 11, 2009). "A G protein-coupled receptor is essential for Schwann cells to initiate myelination". Science. 325 (5946): 1402–5. Bibcode:2009Sci...325.1402M. doi:10.1126/science.1173474. PMC 2856697. PMID 19745155.
