= Philip Neri =

Italian Roman Catholic saint

Saint Philip Neri Cong. Orat.
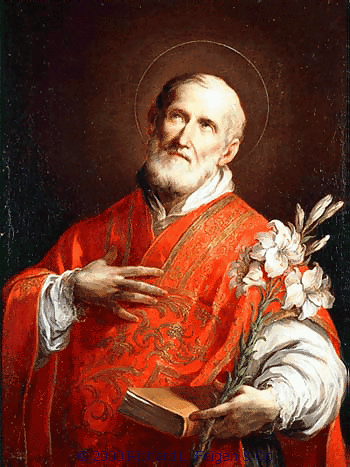

Priest, Confessor, and Founder of the Oratorians
- Born: 21 July 1515; Florence, Republic of Florence
- Died: 26 May 1595 (aged 79); Rome, Papal States
- Venerated in: Catholic Church; Church of England
- Beatified: 11 May 1615 by Pope Paul V
- Canonized: 12 March 1622 by Pope Gregory XV
- Feast: 26 May
- Patronage: Rome, Italy; Candida, Italy; Mandaluyong, Philippines; Albuquerque, New Mexico; US Special Forces; Institute of Christ the King Sovereign Priest; Catbalogan, Philippines; laughter; joy; comedians; artists; writers

Philip Neri CO, born Filippo Romolo Neri, pronounced [fiˈlippo ˈrɔːmolo ˈneːri] (21 July 1515 – 26 May 1595) was an Italian Catholic priest who founded the Congregation of the Oratory, a society of secular clergy dedicated to pastoral care and charitable work. He is sometimes referred to as the "Second Apostle of Rome" after Peter the Apostle, and sometimes as the "Third Apostle of Rome", after Peter and Paul the Apostle. Neri's spiritual mission emphasised personal holiness and direct service to others, particularly through the education of young people and care for the poor and sick. His work played a significant role in the Counter-Reformation, especially within the city of Rome.

Neri's early life in Florence and later move to Rome in 1533 marked the beginning of his dedication to missionary work. He initially gained prominence for his pastoral care and efforts to minister to marginalised communities, including prostitutes and the destitute. His passion for reform and personal holiness drew many followers, leading to the formation of the Church of the Most Holy Trinity of the Pilgrims and the Congregation of the Oratory. The Oratory became a centre of spiritual renewal and pastoral innovation, focusing on prayer, music, and informal spiritual gatherings that combined religious instruction with personal reflection.

As a spiritual leader, Neri was noted for his humility, humour, piety, and ability to inspire deep devotion among both clergy and laypeople. His friendship with figures such as Ignatius of Loyola and influence over the Society of Jesus played a role in the broader movement of Church reform. Neri also engaged in limited political activity, most notably when he intervened to secure the reconciliation of Henry IV of France with the Church.

Canonised in 1622, Philip Neri remains a significant figure in Catholic tradition. His feast day is celebrated on 26 May, and he is venerated for his contributions to personal spirituality and the Catholic Church. His legacy is associated with the Seven Churches Walk, a pilgrimage he initiated, and his promotion of musical forms such as the "laude" and oratorios, which had lasting impacts on sacred music.

== Early life ==
Philip was the son of Francesco di Neri, a lawyer, and his wife Lucrezia da Mosciano, whose family were nobility in the service of the state. He was carefully brought up and received his early teaching from the friars at San Marco, the famous Dominican monastery in Florence. He was accustomed in later life to ascribing most of his progress to the teaching of two of them, Zenobio de' Medici and Servanzio Mini. At the age of 18, in 1533, Philip was sent to his uncle, Romolo, a wealthy merchant at San Germano (now Cassino), a then Neapolitan town near the base of Monte Cassino, to assist him in his business, and with the hope that Philip might inherit Romolo's fortune. Philip did gain Romolo's confidence and affection, but during his stay, he also experienced a religious conversion. From then onward, Philip no longer cared for the things of this world. In 1533, he left San Germano to live in Rome.

== Founding of the Oratory ==
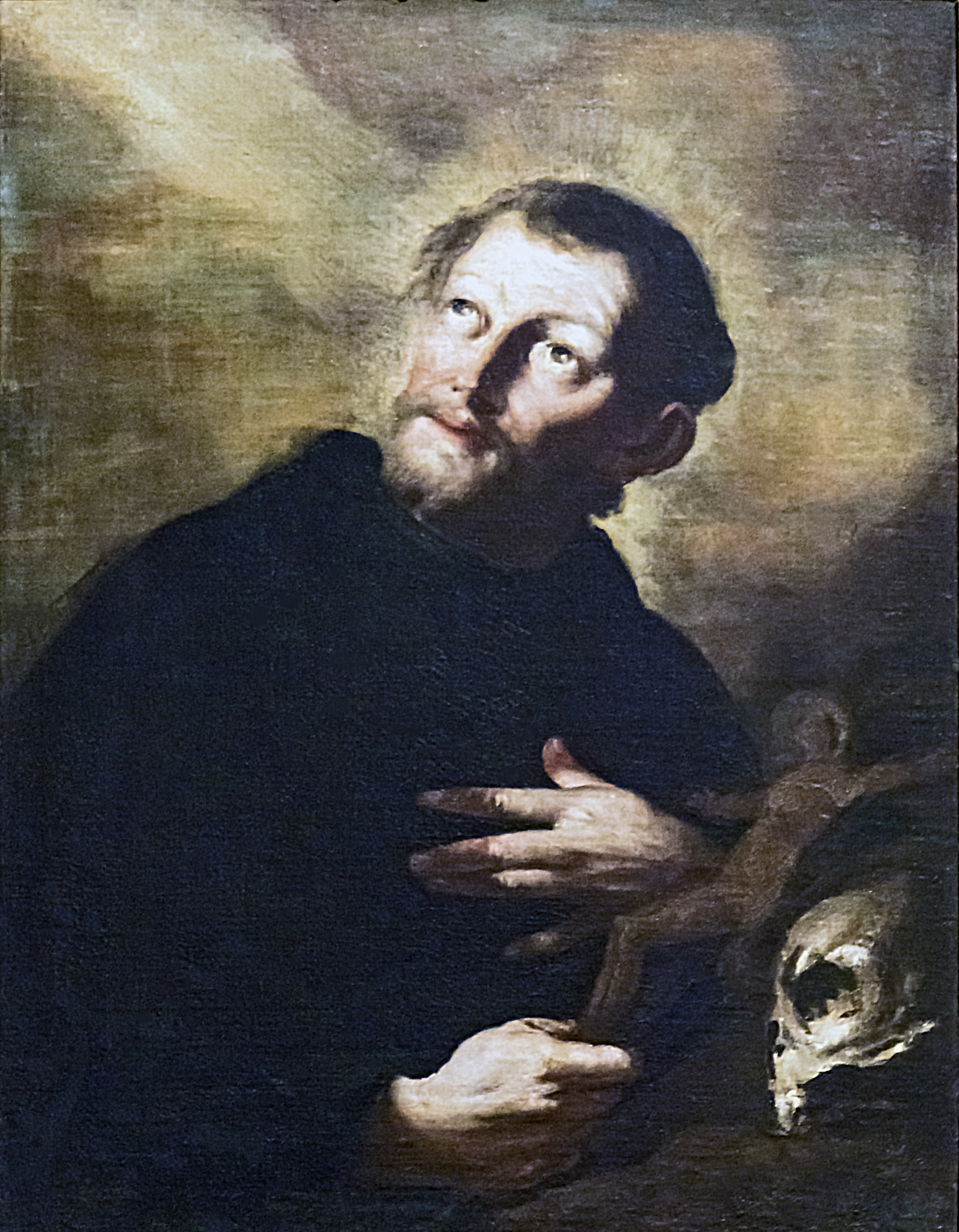
Philip Neri

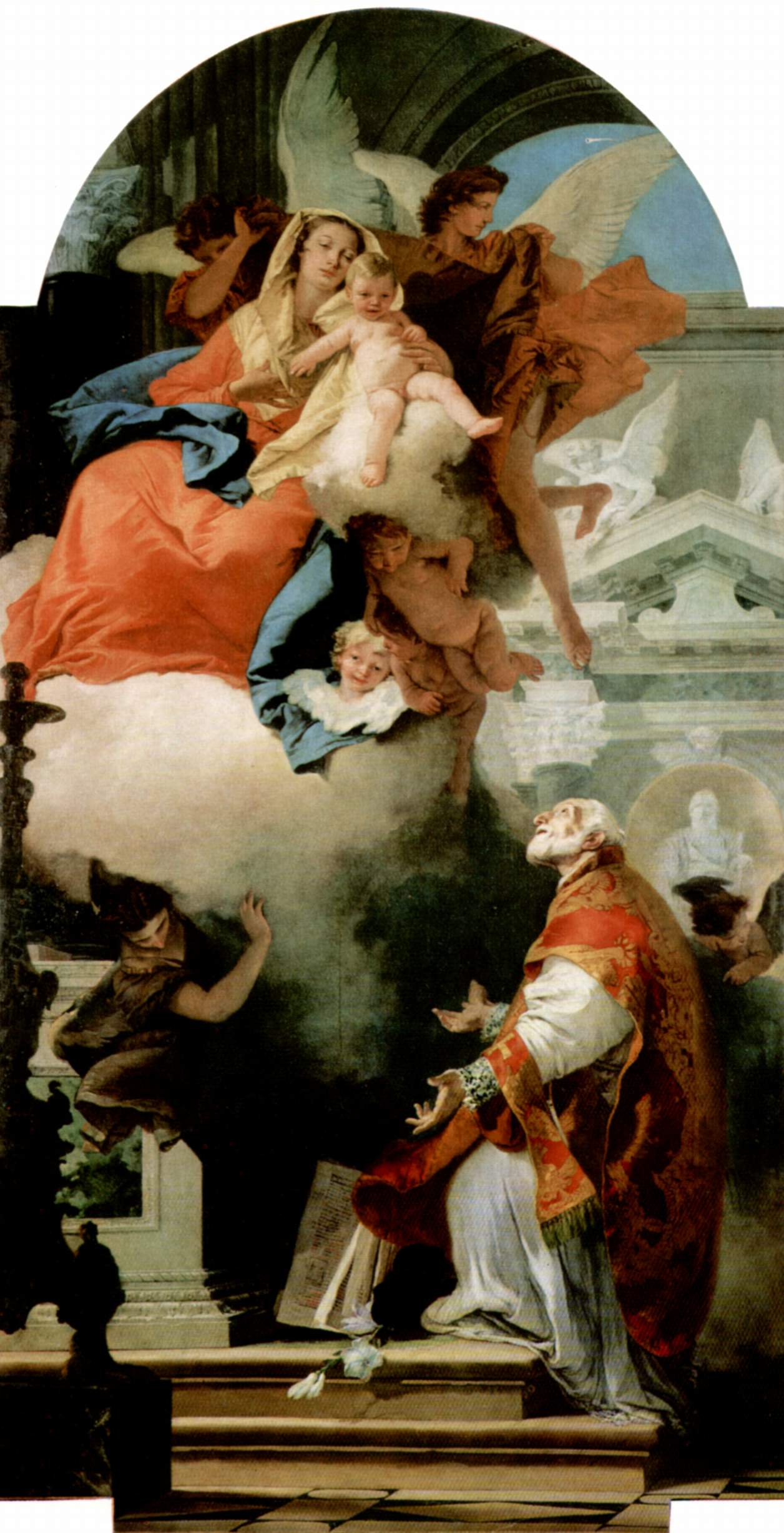
St. Philip Neri and the Virgin Mary, by Tiepolo

=== Mission work ===
After arriving in Rome, Philip became a tutor in the house of a Florentine aristocrat named Galeotto Caccia. After two years, he began to pursue his studies (for three years) under the guidance of the Augustinians. Following this, he began those labours amongst the sick and poor which, in later life, gained him the title of "Apostle of Rome". He also ministered to the prostitutes of the city. In 1538, he entered into the home mission work for which he became famous, travelling throughout the city, seeking opportunities of entering into conversation with people, and of leading them to consider the topics he set before them. For seventeen years Philip lived as a layman in Rome, probably without thinking of becoming a priest. Around 1544, he made the acquaintance of Ignatius of Loyola. Many of Philip's disciples found their vocations in the infant Society of Jesus.

=== Confraternity of the Holy Trinity ===
In 1548, together with his confessor, Persiano Rossa, Philip founded the Confraternity of the Most Holy Trinity of Pilgrims and Convalescents (Italian: Santissima Trinità de' Pellegrini e de' Convalescenti), whose primary object was to minister to the needs of the thousands of poor pilgrims who flocked to Rome, especially in jubilee years, and also to relieve the patients discharged from hospitals but who were still too weak for labor. Members met for prayer at the Church of San Salvatore in Campo where the devotion of the Forty Hours of Exposition of the Blessed Sacrament was first introduced into Rome.

=== The Oratory ===
In 1551, Philip received all the minor orders and was ordained deacon and finally priest (on 23 May). He thought of going to India as a missionary but was dissuaded by his friends who saw that there was abundant work to be done in Rome. Accordingly, he settled down, with some companions, at the Hospital of San Girolamo della Carità. There in 1556, he tentatively founded the Congregation of the Oratory, an institute with which his name is especially connected. The scheme at first was no more than a series of evening meetings in a hall (the Oratory), at which there were prayers, hymns, and readings from Scripture, the church fathers, and the Martyrology, followed by a lect of some religious question proposed for consideration. The musical selections (settings of scenes from sacred history) were called oratorios. Giovanni Palestrina was one of Philip's followers and composed music for the services. The program developed, and the members of the society undertook various kinds of mission work throughout Rome, notably the preaching of sermons in different churches every evening, a completely new idea at that time. He also spent much of his time hearing confessions and effected many conversions in this way.

In 1564, the Florentines requested that Philip leave San Girolamo to oversee their newly built church in Rome, San Giovanni dei Fiorentini. He was at first reluctant, but by consent of Pope Pius IV he accepted while remaining in charge of San Girolamo where the exercises of the Oratory were kept up. At this time, the new society included among its members Caesar Baronius (the ecclesiastical historian), Francesco Maria Tarugi (afterwards Archbishop of Avignon), and Ottavio Paravicini – all of whom later became cardinals – and also Gallonius (Antonio Galloni, author of a well-known work on the Sufferings of the Martyrs), Ancina, Bordoni, and other men of ability and distinction. In 1574, the Florentines built a large oratory or mission room for the society, next to San Giovanni – to save them the fatigue of the daily journey to and from San Girolamo, and to provide a more convenient place of assembly – and the headquarters were transferred there.

As the community grew, and its mission work extended, the need for a church entirely its own made itself felt, and the small parish church of Santa Maria in Vallicella, conveniently situated in the middle of Rome, was offered and accepted. The building, however, not large enough for their purpose, was pulled down, and a splendid church was erected on the site. It was immediately after taking possession of their new quarters that Philip formally organised, under permission of a papal bull dated 15 July 1575, a community of secular priests, called the Congregation of the Oratory. The new church was consecrated early in 1577, and the clergy of the new society at once resigned the charge of San Giovanni dei Fiorentini; Philip himself did not leave San Girolamo until 1583, and then only by an injunction of the pope that he, as the superior, should reside at the chief house of his congregation. He was at first elected for a term of three years (as was common in modern societies) but in 1587 was nominated superior for life. He was, however, entirely free from personal ambition, and had no desire to be superior general over several dependent houses, so he desired that all congregations formed on his model outside Rome should be autonomous, governing themselves, and with no provision for Philip to retain control over any new foundation they might themselves make elsewhere – a regulation afterward formally confirmed by a brief of Gregory XV in 1622.

== Political activity ==
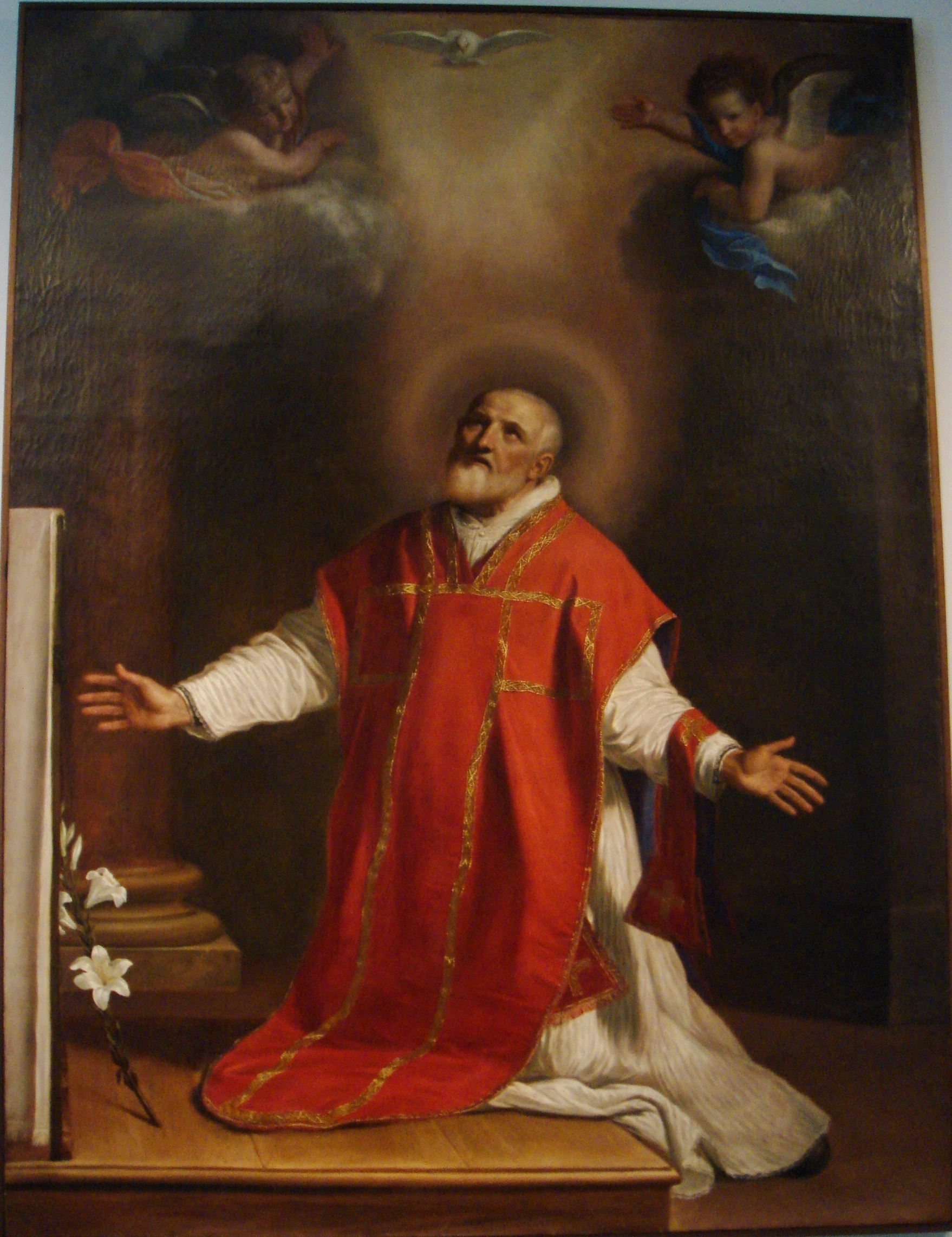
Philip Neri, as painted by Guercino in 1656

Although Philip refrained from becoming involved in political matters, he broke this rule in 1593–1595 when he persuaded Pope Clement VIII to revoke the excommunication and anathema pronounced against Henry IV of France and the refusal to receive his ambassador, even though the king had formally renounced Calvinism. Philip saw that the pope's attitude was more than likely to drive Henry to relapse and rekindle the civil war in France, and directed Caesar Baronius, a member of the Oratory who was then the pope's confessor, to refuse the pope absolution and to resign the office of confessor unless the pope withdrew the anathema. Clement yielded at once, though the whole College of Cardinals had supported his policy; and Henry, who did not learn the facts until several years afterwards, testified lively gratitude for the timely and political intervention. Philip continued in the government of the Oratory until his death. He was succeeded by Baronius.

== Personal character ==
Philip Neri embodied several contradictions, combining popular veneration with intensely individual piety. He became deeply involved with the Church while seeking to reform a corrupt Rome and an indifferent clergy.

Philip possessed a playful sense of humour, combined with a shrewd wit. He considered a cheerful temper to be more Christian than a melancholic one and carried this spirit into his whole life: "A joyful heart is more easily made perfect than a downcast one." This was the secret of Neri's popularity and his place in the folklore of the Roman poor. Many miracles were attributed to him. When his body was examined after death, it was found that two of his ribs had been broken, which was attributed at the time to the expansion of his heart while fervently praying in the catacombs c. 1545. Benedict XIV, who reorganized the rules for canonization, decided that Philip's enlarged heart was caused by an aneurysm. Ponnelle and Bordet, in their 1932 biography St. Philip Neri and the Roman Society of His Times (1515–1595), conclude that it was partly natural and partly supernatural. What is certain is that Philip himself and his penitents associated it with divine love.

"Practical commonplaceness," says Frederick William Faber in his panegyric on Philip, "was the special mark that distinguishes his form of ascetic piety from the types accredited before his day. He looked like other men. ...He was emphatically a modern gentleman, of scrupulous courtesy, and sportive gaiety, acquainted with what was going on in the world, taking a real interest in it, giving and getting information, very neatly dressed, with a shrewd common sense always alive about him, in a modern room with modern furniture, plain, it is true, but with no marks of poverty about it – in a word, with all the ease, the gracefulness, the polish of a modern gentleman of good birth, considerable accomplishments, and widespread knowledge."

Accordingly, Philip was ready to meet the needs of his day to an extent and in a manner which even the versatile Jesuits, who much desired to enlist him in their company, did not rival; and, though an Italian priest and head of a new religious order, his genius was entirely unmonastic and unmedieval – frequent and popular preaching, unconventional prayer, and unsystematized, albeit fervent, private devotion.

Philip prayed, "Let me get through today, and I shall not fear tomorrow."

Philip had no difficulties in respect of the teaching of his Church. His great merit was the instinctive tact that showed him that the system of monasticism could never be the leaven of secular life in the world of his day, but that something more homely, simple, and everyday in character was needed for the new times then emerging.

== Death and veneration ==
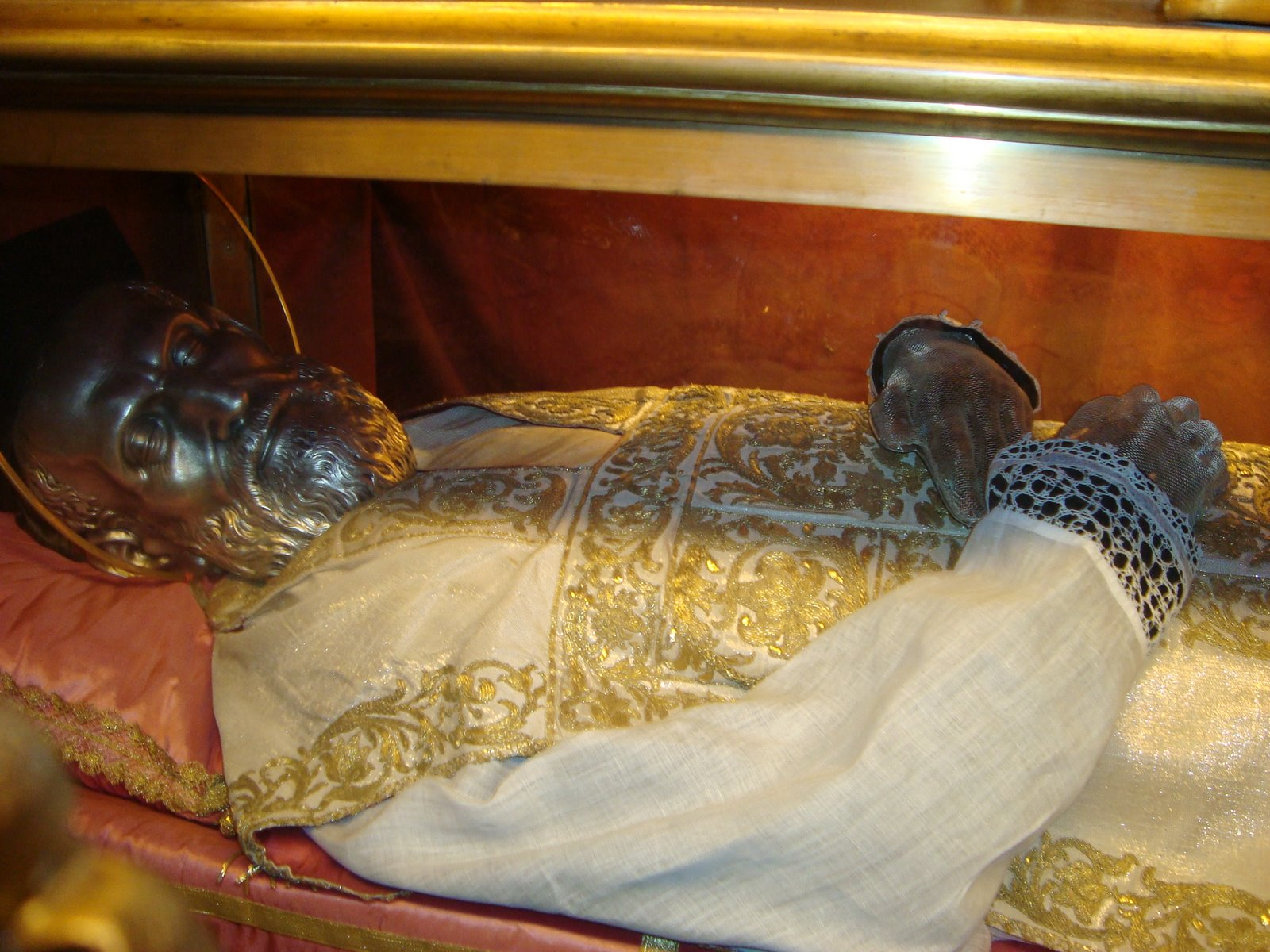
Philip Neri's effigy at his tomb

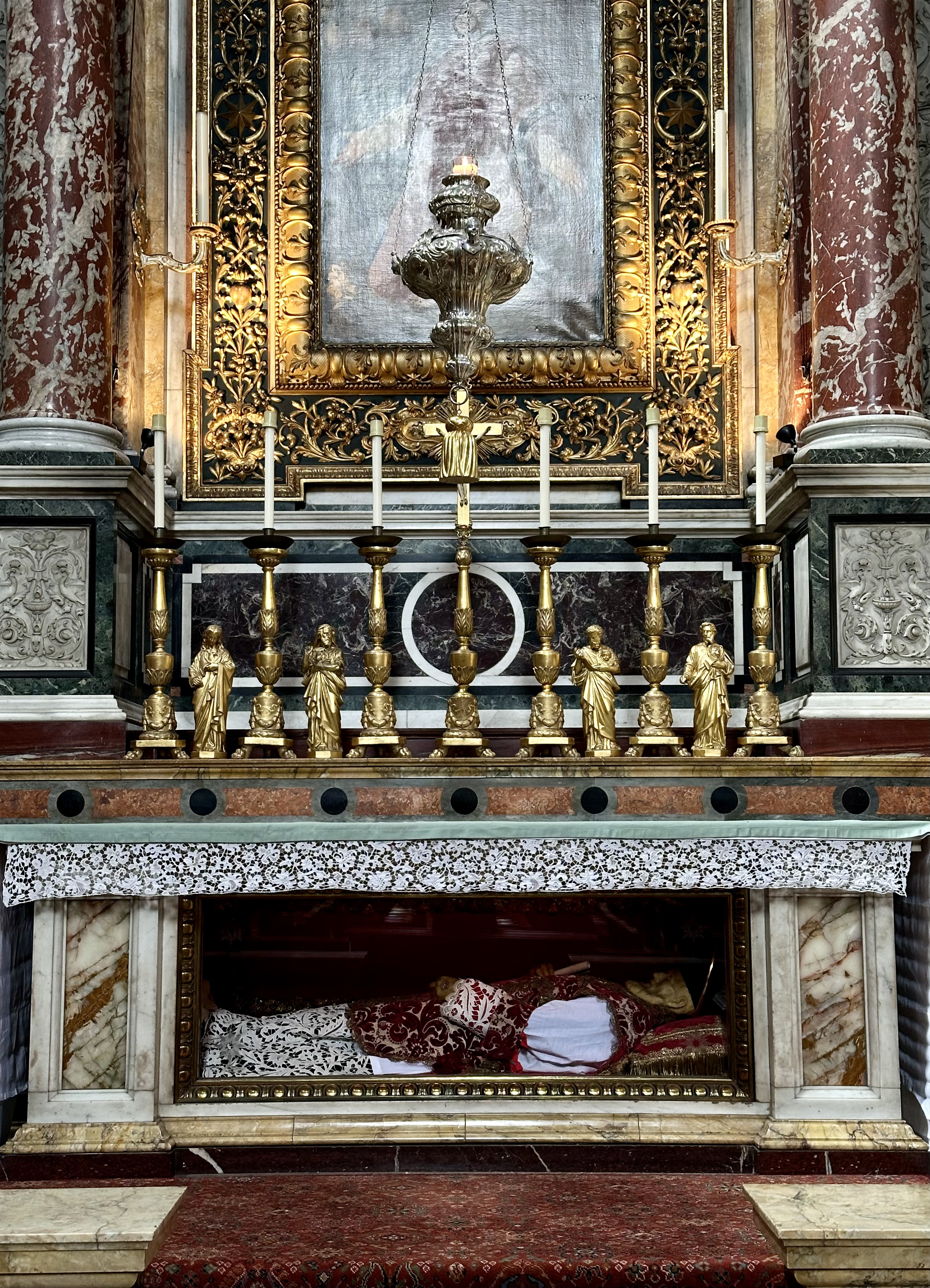
An altar dedicated to St Philip Neri at Brompton Oratory in London, containing a wax effigy of the saint

Philip Neri died around the end of the day on 25 May 1595, the Feast of Corpus Christi that year, after having spent the day hearing confessions and receiving visitors. About midnight, he began haemorrhaging, and Baronius read the commendatory prayers over him. Baronius asked that he bless his spiritual sons before dying, and, though he could no longer speak, he blessed them with the sign of the cross and died.

Philip Neri was beatified by Paul V in 1615 and canonised by Pope Gregory XV in 1622. His memorial is celebrated on 26 May. His body is venerated in the Chiesa Nuova ("New Church") in Rome.

Philip Neri is one of the influential figures of the Counter-Reformation and is noted for converting to personal holiness many of the influential people within the church itself. His attitude towards animals is referred to in the Catechism of the Catholic Church as offering an example to be followed, alongside the gentleness shown to animals by Francis of Assisi.

Philip is remembered in the Church of England with a commemoration on 26 May.

== Iconography ==
The first major depiction of the Saint is by Guido Reni: Saint Philip Neri and the Madonna of the Vallicella. Painted in 1614-15 for the chapel dedicated to the Saint in the Church of Santa Maria in Vallicella in Rome, the canvas was later moved to the Oratorian convent adjoining the church; it established the iconographic model that was replicated countless times over the following two centuries. Philip is shown kneeling in deep contemplation as the Madonna and Child appear to him, accompanied by angels. Created to mark the Saint's beatification, the image helped define his canonical appearance. It is significant that the Virgin occupies a relatively small space: the focal point of the composition is Saint Philip's mystical experience, not merely the apparition of the Madonna. Between 1640 and 1642, Pietro da Cortona painted Saint Philip Neri Healing Clement VIII of Gout, a work housed in the Uffizi Gallery in Florence. Also between 1664 and 1665, Pietro da Cortona painted the vault fresco of the Church of Santa Maria in Vallicella in Rome, depicting the Vision of Saint Philip Neri; the Saint is said to have experienced this vision during the church's reconstruction, seeing the Virgin Mary miraculously supporting a beam to prevent it from collapsing onto the chapel, the image of the Virgin, and the Blessed Sacrament. In the 1660s, Carlo Maratta painted Saint Philip Neri Having a Vision of the Madonna and Child for the Basilica of San Giovanni dei Fiorentini in Rome. The painting is now housed in the gallery of Palazzo Pitti the Pitti Palace in Florence. Between 1724 and 1730, Francesco Solimena created a cycle of frescoes depicting the life of Saint Philip for the Church of the Girolamini in Naples. A few years later, in 1740, Giovanni Battista Tiepolo painted The Apparition of the Virgin to Saint Philip Neri for the Church of San Filippo in Camerino. Some years later, Sebastiano Conca painted the Madonna and Child Conversing with Saint Philip Neri in the Presence of Saint Nicholas of Bari for the Basilica of San Lorenzo in Damaso in Rome; the Madonna and Child with Saint Philip Neri and Saint Francis in the Church of Santa Maria in Monticelli, also in Rome, is attributed to Conca. In 1745, Jacopo Zoboli painted Saint Philip Neri Kneeling Before the Madonna for the Church of Santa Maria della Pace a Brescia.

== Legacy ==
=== The Oratory ===
The congregation Philip Neri founded is of an original stamp, little resembling a monastery of the older type, and its rules (not drawn up by Philip Neri, but approved by Pope Paul V in 1612) leave considerable freedom of action compared with traditional religious foundations.

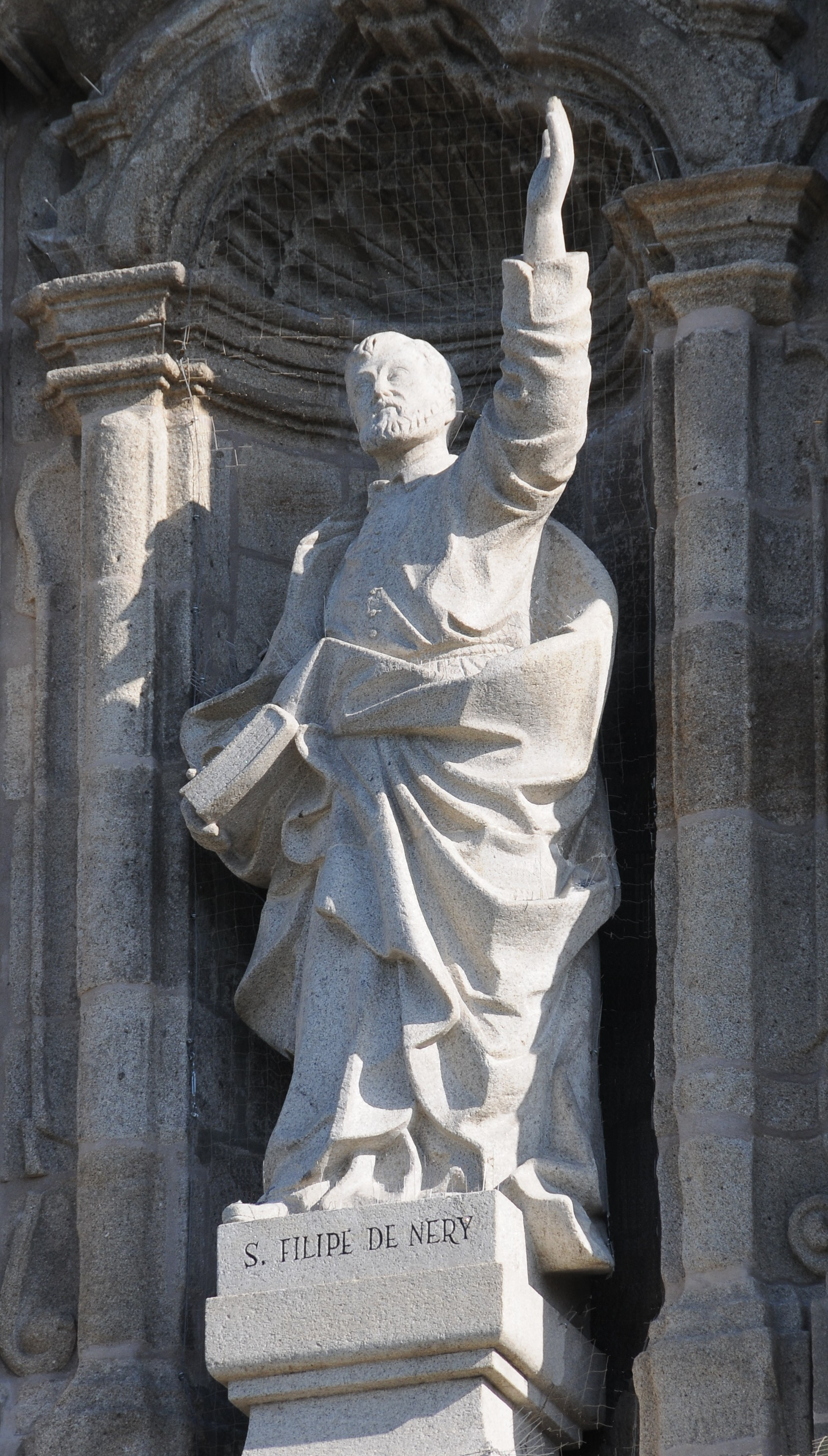
Statue of Philip Neri in Congregados Church, Braga, Portugal

The Congregation of the Oratory of Saint Philip Neri is a pontifical society of apostolic life of Catholic priests and lay brothers who live together in a community bound together but without formal vows. They are commonly referred to as Oratorians (Oratorian Fathers). Oratorians commit themselves to membership in a particular, independent, self-governing local community (an Oratory, usually named for the place in which it is located). In some locations, the local Oratory has been designated to administer a particular parish; others may be tasked with campus ministry.

=== The French Oratory ===
The Oratory movement spread in the early period, especially in Italy. In France, a separate and distinct foundation from the Oratory of Saint Philip Neri was founded, though inspired by St Philip's model. Best known as the French Oratory, it was founded in 1611 in Paris, France, by Pierre de Bérulle (1575–1629), later a cardinal of the Catholic Church. The French Oratory had a determinant influence on the French school of spirituality throughout the 17th century. Unlike St Philip's Oratory, it operates under the central authority of a Superior General. Early members included Nicolas Malebranche, Louis Thomassin, Jules Mascaron and Jean Baptiste Massillon. Suppressed at the French Revolution, it was revived by Pierre Pététot, curé of St Roch, in 1852, as the "Oratory of Jesus and Mary Immaculate".

=== Music ===
Philip Neri encouraged the singing of the Lauda spiritual (laude) in his oratory services. The prominent composers Tomás Luis de Victoria and Giovanni Pierluigi da Palestrina probably participated in this music. Historian Francesco Danieli speculates that this would have produced a unique and varied aesthetic experience.

=== Seven Churches Walk ===
Philip sometimes led "excursions" to other churches, often with music and a picnic on the way. In 1553, Neri started the tradition of making a one-day pilgrimage to seven churches, starting from St. Peter's Basilica and ending at the Basilica di Santa Maria Maggiore.

The tradition of visiting all seven churches was started by Neri to combine conviviality and the sharing of a common religious experience through discovering the heritage of the early saints. Neri drew up an itinerary that included visits to St. Peter's Basilica, then St. Paul Outside-the-Walls, St. Sebastian's, St. John Lateran, Holy Cross-in-Jerusalem, St. Lawrence-Outside-the-Walls, and finally St. Mary Major. He and a few friends and acquaintances would gather before dawn and set out on their walk. At each church, there would be prayer, hymn singing, and a brief sermon by Neri.

A simple meal was pre-arranged at the gardens of the Villa Mattei. The Mattei family opened their grounds for pilgrims to rest and provided them with bread, wine, cheese, eggs, apples, and salami. During these "picnics", musicians would play, and singers would perform.

The street which links Basilica of Saint Paul Outside the Walls with San Sebastiano fuori le mura is still called "Via Delle Sette Chiese" (Seven Churches Walk). These pilgrimages were designed to be a counterpoint to the raucous behaviour of Carnival. The Walks became very popular and began to attract others. From this developed the custom of visiting seven churches on Maundy Thursday. In Rome, the Seven Church Walk is traditionally done on Wednesday of Holy Week.

== In popular culture ==
Johnny Dorelli played Philip Neri in a 1983 Italian movie State buoni se potete.

Gigi Proietti played Philip Neri in a 2010 Italian movie made for television, Saint Philip Neri: I Prefer Heaven.

== See also ==
- Oratory School
- Saint Philip, patron saint archive
- Seven Churches Visitation

== Sources ==
- Danieli, Francesco (2009). San Filippo Neri. La nascita dell'Oratorio e lo sviluppo dell'arte cristiana al tempo della riforma. San Paolo: Cinisello Balsamo.
- Ingold, A M.P. (1911). "The Oratory of Saint Philip Neri" . In Herbermann, Charles (ed.). Catholic Encyclopedia. Vol. 11. New York: Robert Appleton Company.
- Smither, Howard E. (2001). "Filippo Neri". In Sadie, Stanley; Tyrrell, John (eds.). The New Grove Dictionary of Music and Musicians (2nd ed.). London: Macmillan. ISBN 978-1-56159-239-5.
- Walsh, M., ed. (1991). Butler's Lives of the Saints. New York: HarperSanFrancisco.

Attribution:

=== Further reading ===
- Türks, Paul (1995). Philip Neri: The Fire of Joy. Translated by Daniel Utrecht. Edinburgh, Scotland, UK: T&T Clark. ISBN 0567293033. Authorised English translation of Philipp Neri oder Das Feuer der Freude (Freiburg im Breisgau: Herder, 1986, ISBN 3-451-20809-1).
- Alfonso Capecelatro, The life of Saint Philip Neri, Apostle of Rome v.1 (1894).
- Vuaillat, Jean (1967). Saint Philippe Néri : le saint toujours joyeux. Lyon: Éditions et imprimeries du Sud-Est. OCLC 460693224.
- The life of Saint Philip Neri, Apostle of Rome v.2 (1894).
- Bacci, Pietro Giacomo. The life of Saint Philip Neri, Apostle of Rome, and founder of the congregation of the oratory (1902).
- Neri, Philip (1847). The maxims and sayings of St Philip Neri .
