= Cecilia Danieli =

Italian entrepreneur and industrialist (1943–1999)

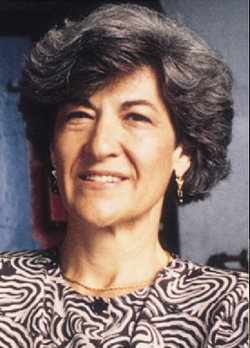
- Born: 22 June 1943; Udine, Italy
- Died: 17 June 1999 (aged 56); Aviano, Italy
- Citizenship: Italy
- Education: University of Trieste
- Occupations: Entrepreneur; Industrialist
- Years active: 1965–1999
- Employer: Danieli
- Spouse: Italo Moreschi
- Children: 3

Cecilia Danieli (22 June 1943 – 17 June 1999) was an Italian entrepreneur and industrialist who was director and later chairperson of the family-owned Danieli steel company. She began working in the company in 1965, as an assistant to her father. Danieli was made financial director in 1976, establishing a managerial department and expanded sales abroad. She was made general director in 1980. When she was appointed managing director four years later, she oversaw the design and development of small units called mini-mills, expanded Danieli's production centres abroad to co-ordinate specialised businesses, and floated Danieli on the Italian Bourse. She was inducted into the American Metal Market Hall of Fame in 2013.

== Biography ==
Danieli was born on 22 June 1943, in Udine, Italy. She was the daughter of the steel magnate Luigi Danieli and Teresa Zoratti. Danieli's grandfather Mario was born in Valsugana and he and his brother Timo were the first in Italy to employ electric arc furnaces in producing steel in 1914. She was the eldest of four daughters and was raised primarily in the commune of Buttrio. She was educated at elementary schools in Argentina from 1949 to 1950 as her father undertook a steel project in the country. Following graduation from Undine's A. Zanon di Udine (English: A. Zanon Technical Institute) with a degree in accounting, Danieli spent some time overseas, learnt English, and worked as a student for a period of time on a truck farm close to Schuylerville, New York.

She decided to follow her father into the steel business, since she was the only one of his daughters to become interested in the family-operated business Danieli and learnt of the trade from her father, and began working as his assistant in 1965. That same year, Danieli enrolled at the University of Trieste in its Faculty of Economics and Commerce, graduating with an economics degree in July 1969 with a thesis on the family business called Tutela dell'invenzione industriale. For three years, she was employed in the company's commercial section. In 1976, the Danieli Group registered the first loss in its history as an increase in oil prices decreased the capital available for steel investment; Danieli was named financial director, leading its day-to-day operations following the resignation of its previous holder. She established a managerial department focused on the company's commercial, production and technical side, and expanded sales to Asia, the Americas and the Soviet Union. Danieli was able to secure a $240 million contract to construct a steel mill in East Germany.

Her responsibilities in the business grew as the 1970s drew to a close, and she was appointed general manager in 1980, replacing her father. The following year, Danieli oversaw the construction of the world's biggest continuous casting plant on behalf of the Società europea tubifici e acciaierie (English: European Steel Tube Company), and alongside the Austrian-based Voestalpine, secured an order to build a steel plant in Belarus in 1982. In 1984, she was named managing director of the company. In the same year, on the advice of corporate experts, Danieli accepted the idea of making the company public as a financial tool to allow her to strive of the business' new objectives. She and her longtime companion Gianpietro Benedetti floated the company on the Italian Bourse despite opposition from her father; Danieli and Benedetti retained 54 per cent of the company.

During her leadership, she focused on the design and development of relatively small units called mini-mills which could allow for the more efficient and cheap production of high-quality steel than traditional mills. Danieli and the company constructed or equipped half of the 250 mini-mills across the globe between 1981 and the early 1990s. The company purchased the Swedish-based Morgardshammar and Danieli acquired shares in Falck Steelworks as well as being appointed a director of the business in 1988. She also expanded Danieli's production centres to Pittsburgh, Smedjebacken, Paris and Olpe to co-ordinate the operations of 15 specialised businesses. In 1991, Danieli was appointed chair of the board, when the shareholders unanimously elected her to the position during a meeting. She once spent Christmas Day negotiating a sale in the Iranian mountains during the mid-1990s. Danieli also became a shareholder of INA in 1994 and declined an offer to lead the General Confederation of Italian Industry since she wanted to keep a low profile.

== Personal life ==
Danieli was known as "Italy's First Lady of Steel" by the foreign press and her peers. In 1997, she was awarded the Leonardo qualità Italia Award (English: Leonardo Quality Italy Award) and the Epifania Award. Danieli was married to the lawyer Italo Moreschi; they had three children. She died from cancer in the Centro di riferimento Oncologico (English: Oncology Reference Center) in Aviano, late on 17 June 1999. On the morning of 19 June, Danieli was given a funeral in the Danieli Group's manufacturing plant outside Udine attended by around 3,000 people.

== Legacy ==
John Tagliabue of The New York Times noted that as a woman, Danieli was "one of a handful who reached the top in the male domain of heavy industry" and that her leadership allowed her to say she had "a higher percentage of women in management posts than Italian companies of comparable size." She was inducted into the American Metal Market Hall of Fame in 2013 "for her role in guiding Danieli Group to the forefront in the construction and equipping of steel mini-mills".
