= Tselina (disambiguation) =

Tselina (IPA: [tsɨlʲɪˈna]) is an umbrella term for underdeveloped, scarcely populated high-fertility lands.

Tselina may also refer to:

== Places ==
- Tselina, Bulgaria, a populated place in Chirpan Municipality of Stara Zagora Province, Bulgaria
- Tselina, Russia, a rural locality (a settlement) in Tselinsky District of Rostov Oblast, Russia
- Tselinograd (Russian: Целиноград, lit. 'City of tselina'), a former name of Astana - the present capital city of Kazakhstan.

== Other uses ==
- Virgin Lands campaign, 1953–1965 Soviet project to boost agriculture
- Tselina (satellite), a Russian satellite used for military space-based radio surveillance system
- 2111 Tselina, a main-belt asteroid

== See also ==
- Celina (disambiguation)
