= Celina =

Celina may refer to:

== Places ==
- Celina, Indiana, an unincorporated community
- Celina, Minnesota, an unincorporated community
- Celina, Ohio, a city
- Celina, Tennessee, a city
- Celina, Texas, a city
- Čelina, Czech Republic, a village
- Čelina, Konjic, a village in Bosnia and Herzegovina
- Čelina, Croatia, a village near Omiš
- Celina, Kosovo, a village near Rahovec

== Other uses ==
- Celina (beetle), a genus of water beetle
- Moderate Tropical Storm Celina, in the 2007–2008 South-West Indian Ocean cyclone season

== See also ==
- Celine
- Cellino
- Cellina (disambiguation)
- Selina
- Selena (given name)
- Tselina
- Tselina (disambiguation)
