= Cellino =

Cellino may refer to:

- 3857 Cellino, a main-belt asteroid
- Cellino Attanasio, an Italian municipality of the Province of Teramo, Abruzzo
- Cellino San Marco, an Italian municipality of the Province of Brindisi, Apulia
- Cellino & Barnes, a law firm

== People with the surname ==
- Massimo Cellino, Italian-American businessman

== See also ==
- Celina
- Cellina (disambiguation)
