= Return of the Chinese Eastern Railway =

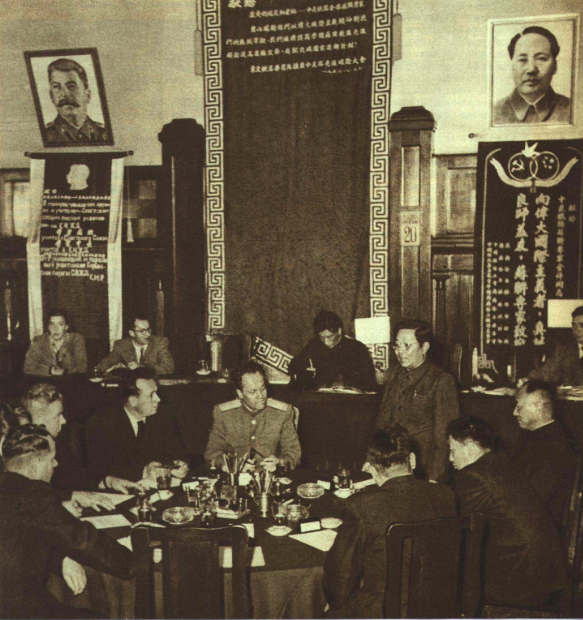
Chinese and Soviet representatives working for transferring the Chinese Eastern Railway to China, September 1952

On 31 December 1952, the Soviet Union returned full control of the Chinese Eastern Railway to the People's Republic of China. The return of the railway marked the first time that the Chinese Eastern Railway (known as the Chinese Changchun Railway at the time) had been under full Chinese control since its construction in 1898. The handover of the railway was the result of negotiations between the Soviet Union and the People's Republic of China culminating in the signing of the Sino-Soviet Treaty of Friendship, Alliance and Mutual Assistance. The Friendship Treaty stipulated that the Chinese Changchun Railway (CCR) be handed over to China no later than 31 December 1952. On that date, China received all of the assets of the Chinese Changchun Railway including 3,282.7 kilometers of railway lines, 10,200 railcars, 880 locomotives, power plants, heavy industries, and coal mines as well as houses, medical facilities, and schools. The transfer of this fully operable railway gave the People's Republic of China control over a politically and economically significant rail line. The Chinese Changchun Railway connected the national railway system to the important ports of Dalian, and Lüshun as well as to international border crossings with the Soviet Union (at Manzhouli and Suifenhe) and to North Korea (at Dandong, Ji'an and Tumen).

Map of the Chinese Eastern Railway

The history of the Chinese Eastern Railway played an integral role in Sino-Soviet relations throughout the 1950s. The railway was a key part of the negotiations that culminated with the Sino-Soviet Friendship Treaty and marked the high point of Sino-Soviet cooperation. As a crucial transportation link for the country, the Chinese Changchun Railway connected China to the outside world, as well as the factories of the Northeast of China to the agricultural centers outside of Manchuria. The railway was and still is crucial to China's economic growth as it connects valuable coal and oil fields to the coastal cities, as well as the important cities of Shenyang, Harbin and Dalian. On the political side, the return of the Chinese Eastern Railway was a diplomatic victory for the Chinese Communist Party, gaining Chinese control over an enterprise that was one of the last remnants of European colonization. Furthermore, the return of the railway and associated Friendship Treaty established the era of Sino-Soviet cooperation that would last until the Sino-Soviet split. The railroad would prove valuable during both the Korean War and the military tensions of the Sino-Soviet border conflict as well, by providing the PLA logistical support to the important border cities of Manzhouli and Suifenhe.

== Background ==
At the Yalta Conference in February 1945, the Soviet government agreed to join the war against Japan ninety days after the surrender of Nazi Germany. One condition of the Soviet Union's agreement to enter the war against Japan was for the return of all Russian territory and property taken during the 1904–1905 Russo-Japanese War. As a result of the Yalta Agreement, upon the end of the war against Japan, the Soviet Union would regain partial control of the Chinese Eastern Railway in the same arrangement as the original Russian concession from 1896. The railway was to be jointly owned and operated by the Soviet Union and Republic of China. In addition, the Soviet Union would regain sovereign interest in the ports of Lüshun and Dalian, which were at the terminus of the southern branch of the Chinese Changchun Railway, the South Manchuria Railway. The Yalta Agreement stated:

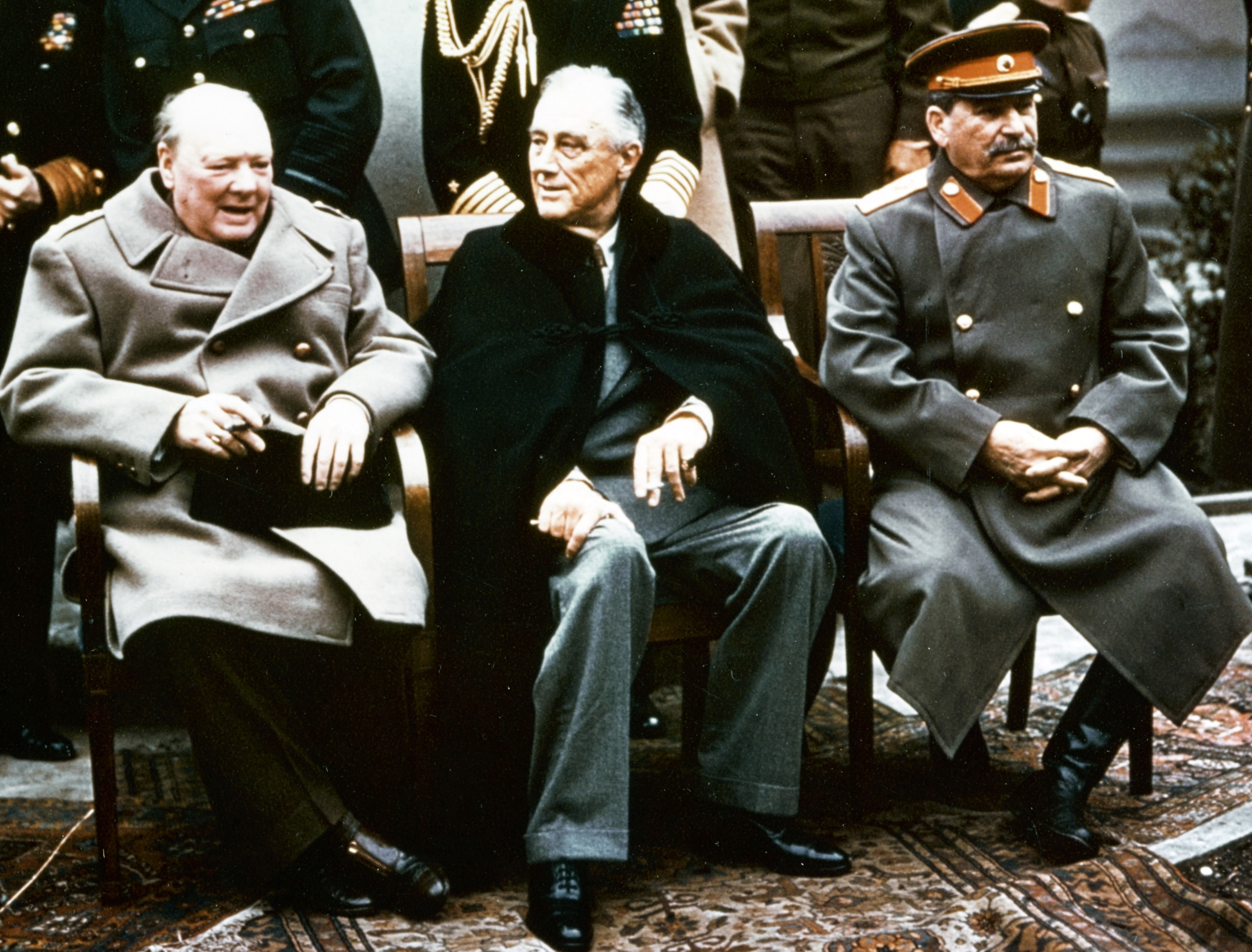
Franklin Roosevelt, Winston Churchill and Joseph Stalin at Yalta in February 1945. The Yalta Accord decided that the USSR would regain control of the Chinese Eastern Railway and the ports of Dalian and Lüshun.

"The Chinese–Eastern Railroad and the South Manchuria Railroad, which provides an outlet to Dairen shall be jointly operated by the establishment of a joint Soviet–Chinese Company, it being understood that the preeminent interests of the Soviet Union shall be safeguarded and that China shall retain full sovereignty in Manchuria."

On 9 August 1945, the Soviet Union invaded through Outer Manchuria and soon occupied Japanese Manchukuo including the entirety of the Chinese Eastern Railway. Shortly thereafter, the Republic of China government and the Soviet Union signed the "Agreement between the Republic of China and the Soviet Socialist Republic on the Changchun Railway of China." This agreement recognized the joint control of the Chinese Eastern Railway and renamed the line to the Chinese Changchun Railway.

In the spring of 1946, the Soviet Army withdrew from much of Manchuria having regained Soviet interests in the Chinese Changchun Railway, and the ports of Dalian and Lüshun. The Chinese Civil War had resumed and Manchuria became a battleground once more. In April 1946, the Chinese Communist Party took control of Harbin, the operations center of the Chinese Changchun Railway. On 25 July 1946, the CPC established their first railway management administration, the Northeast Railway Administration in Harbin, with Chen Yun and Lü Zhengcao serving as the deputy chief secretaries. These two men alongside the railway managers from the Soviet Union formed the joint management of the CCR, taking control of the railway from the retreating Republic of China. During the civil war, the Chinese Changchun Railway became a battlefield and sustained serious damage during the Battle of Siping, and the Liaoshen Campaign. One of the most critically damaged sites was the bridge over the Songhua River in Harbin which had been destroyed by the retreating Republic of China Army. In response, the Soviet Union deployed the Army's Fifth Engineering Group to help rebuild the bridge and restore service along the CCR. This team of 150 workers and Soviet experts worked alongside Chinese workers to repair the Songhua River Railway Bridge, which reopened in 24 October 1948. By January 1949, the remainder of the Chinese Changchun Railway had been reopened for operation, with the railway administration remaining in the joint Chinese–Soviet ownership and management. The railway was essential for the advancing People's Liberation Army as a pipeline for Soviet aid, making the railroad a significant part of USSR–CPC relations before the establishment of the People's Republic of China on 1 October 1949.

== Timeline of events ==
1896 — The Qing Dynasty grants a concession to build the railway to Tsarist Russia.

1898 — Russia leases the Liaodong Peninsula from China.

1901 — Railway is completed from Manzhouli to Suifenhe and from Harbin to Dalian and Lüshun.

1905 — The Treaty of Portsmouth is signed; Russia loses control of the Liaodong Peninsula, the southern railway as far as Changchun and the ports of Dalian and Lüshun to the Japanese Empire, which established the South Manchuria Railway to operate it after regauging.

1917 — The October Revolution which leads to the founding of the Soviet Union.

1924 — The Republic of China and USSR agree to joint administration of the Chinese Eastern Railway.

1929 — The USSR and ROC fight a brief war over control of the railway. Soviet victory ensures that the railway stays jointly administered and Soviet owned.

1935 — The USSR sells the Chinese Eastern Railway to Manchukuo; the railway is regauged and becomes part of Manchukuo National Railway.

1945 — Railway jointly administered by ROC and USSR as the Chinese Changchun Railway.

1949 — The founding of the People's Republic of China.

1950 — The Sino-Soviet Treaty of Friendship and Mutual Assistance is signed.

1952 — The Chinese Changchun Railway is returned to China.

== Negotiations ==
The negotiations between the Chinese Communist Party and the Soviet Union regarding the return of the Chinese Eastern Railway began even before the establishment of the People's Republic of China. In January and February 1949, Anastas Mikoyan visited the CPC headquarters at Xibaipo to meet with Mao Zedong. By this point in 1949, it appeared like the Communists would soon defeat the Kuomintang, so Joseph Stalin sent Mikoyan, the minister of foreign trade and a Politburo member as a diplomat to discuss the terms of Soviet involvement in a Communist China. The unequal treaties of the past were brought up and Mao Zedong declared that all treaties signed by previous governments of China would not be recognized by a new government led by the CPC. However, as a fellow Communist power, the Soviet claims to China would be examined more closely. The Soviet control of the Port of Lüshun was declared to be unequal to CPC but Mao Zedong deemed the presence of the Soviet Army and Navy at Lüshun to be acceptable until a permanent peace with Japan was declared. On the subject of the CCR, Mikoyan later recorded:

"As for the CCR (Chinese Changchun Railway) Treaty, we do not think it is an unequal treaty, this is because the Railway was mainly financed by Russia. The treaty may not fully reflect the principle of equality, however, I said, we intend to discuss and resolve this issue with the Chinese comrades in a friendly manner."

Already it was clear to both the CPC and USSR that the status of the CCR would have to be negotiated once the CPC gained control of China. However, both sides wanted to demonstrate goodwill towards each other, and recognition of their mutual interests in China's security and economy.

=== The 1950 Sino-Soviet Friendship Treaty ===
With the establishment of the People's Republic of China on 1 October 1949, the PRC adopted a policy of "leaning to one side", that is allying itself with the Soviet Union. Mao Zedong visited Moscow from December 1949 to February 1950 to establish closer ties with the Soviet Union as well as to receive economic assistance. Mao also wanted to renegotiate the previous 1945 Treaty made between the USSR and Republic of China. For the first two months of his visit, Stalin refused to renegotiate the 1945 Treaty, as it was written alongside the Yalta Agreements and he feared any negotiation of the older treaty would weaken other Soviet positions in the Yalta Agreement. The Soviets had gained significant territory and influence through Yalta and Stalin did not want to give the Western Allies any excuse to broach those parts of the Yalta Agreement. Repeatedly, Stalin turned down Mao's request to discuss a new treaty between the PRC and USSR. On 1 January 1950, Mao Zedong told the Soviet Ambassador to China, N.V. Roshchin, that India, Burma, and Britain were thinking about recognizing the People's Republic of China. With this simple message, Mao told Stalin that Chinese relations with the West were warming, which the Soviet Union did not want, but Mao was also showing that the signing of a new Sino-Soviet treaty would prevent any rapproachment between China and the Western Powers. The very next day, Vyacheslav Molotov visited Mao and told him that negotiations for a new treaty between the USSR and China would begin shortly.

The issue of the Chinese Changchun Railway proved to be a sticking point on the Soviet side of the negotiations. In a report for Stalin in January 1950, Kovalev wrote that "it is not in the interests of the Soviet Union to permit a change in the conditions of the 1945 treaty on the Chinese Changchun Railway and that the order for its use as defined by this treaty should be preserved." Furthermore, Kovalev recommended that the new treaty firmly repeat the shared ownership and management of the CCR, create separate accounting for the Railway as the USSR was incurring financial loses under current operations, and combine the operations of the Port of Dalian and the Dal'dok Ship Repair Plant with the operations of the CCR. On 22 January, Zhou Enlai and Mao Zedong met with Joseph Stalin and Vyacheslav Molotov to work out the treaty. Despite Kovalev's recommendations, Stalin was willing to negotiate the status of the CCR in response to the threat to Chinese rapproachment with the West. The Soviets wanted to maintain their joint ownership of the Chinese Changchun Railway and the ports of Dalian and Lüshun, however they were willing to negotiate on the length of ownership from the 30 years stipulated in the original treaty. The Chinese were determined to achieve full sovereignty over the Chinese Changchun Railway and the ports, however they also desired that the Soviet Union make significant capital investments in these properties before eventually returning them to China. In the end, the two sides agreed that the Soviet Union would return the Chinese Changchun Railway to China in two years' time, but would not make capital investments before the handover. In terms of the port at Dalian, it was agreed that the port would also return to China however it would remain a free port to the Soviet Union. The naval port at Lüshun would remain in Soviet control until a permanent peace treaty was signed with Japan, then the port was to be turned over to China and all Soviet troops would leave excepting those who were advisors to the People's Liberation Army Navy.

On 14 February 1950, the People's Republic of China and the Soviet Union formally signed the new Treaty of Friendship, Alliance and Mutual Assistance, as well as the individual treaties regarding the Chinese Changchun Railway, and the ports of Lüshun and Dalian. Article One of the Transfer of Territory and Property Agreement stated:

"Both Contracting Parties agree that the Soviet Government transfer without compensation to the Government of the People's Republic of China all its rights to joint administration of the Chinese Changchun Railway with all the property belonging to the Railway. The transfer shall be effected immediately after the conclusion of a peace treaty with Japan, but not later than the end of 1952."

Furthermore, the Sino-Soviet Treaty also included a 300 million dollar loan and several aid packages that would directly benefit the Chinese Changchun Railway and its associated industries. These included credits for the purchase of Soviet-built railway equipment, rails, and mining machinery. In addition the treaty also set up joint stock companies to manage railway border crossings between the USSR and China, allowing China to have access to Eastern Europe via the Soviet Railway system. These companies at the Chinese Changchun Railway terminals of Manzhouli and Suifenhe provided joint bills of lading, tickets, and shipment for Chinese imports and exports via these important land links.

With the formal signing of this agreement, Mao Zedong and Zhou Enlai returned to China having regained China's sovereignty over the Chinese Changchun Railway. This marked the first time since the railway's construction in 1896 that the railway had been property of China.

== Political impact ==
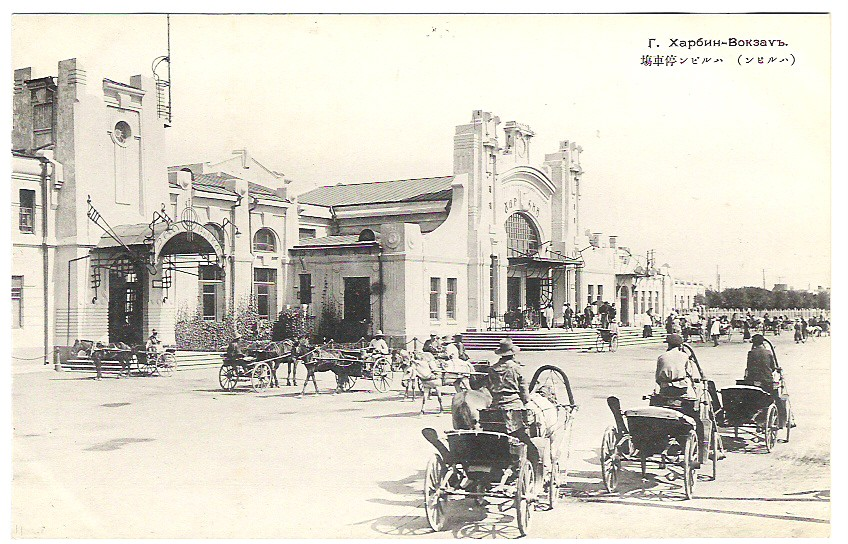
Harbin railway station while under Soviet management

With the return of the Chinese Changchun Railway finalized in the Treaty, the new Chinese Changchun Railway Company began operations on 1 May 1950. This new railway company under joint PRC–USSR ownership was intended to operate the railway until it was fully returned to China by the end of 1952. Despite the proximity of the Korean War to the railway line, the joint operations and preparations for return to China continued uninterrupted for the next two years. In August–September 1952, Zhou Enlai traveled to Moscow to discuss Sino-Soviet relations as well as the ongoing war in Korea. As part of these meetings, the Sino-Soviet Joint Commission was established and released a communique declaring that the commission "should complete the transfer of the CCR to the PRC before 31 December 1952."

The transfer preparations went smoothly and on 31 December 1952, the Chinese Changchun Railway was handed over to the PRC in an afternoon ceremony at the railway headquarters in Harbin. The joint company of the CCR was abolished and the Harbin Railway Management Bureau of Chinese Railways was formally established. That day, the PRC and USSR released a joint communique announcing:

"The CCR property that the Soviet government transferred to the People's Republic of China without charge included the basic trunk line of the railway from Manzhouli station to Suifenhe station as well as from Harbin to Dalian and Lüshunkou, along with the lands working for the line, railway buildings and equipments, vehicles — locomotives, wagons, and carriage compartments, internal-combustion engine vehicles, repair factories of locomotives and compartments, power plants, telephone and telegraph offices, communication equipments and communication lines, railway branches, technical business buildings and residential buildings, economic organizations, subsidiary enterprises and other enterprises and organs, as well as property redeemed, recovered, and built newly during the Sino-Soviet joint management period."

The return of the CCR strengthened the Sino-Soviet alliance which would be crucial for both nations for the next decade. The return of the CCR gave the Treaty legitimacy as it proved that the Soviet Union was good on its word, and was an ally willing to give up crucial economic resources in the name of the Friendship Treaty and Alliance. The majority of Chinese and western scholars have written that "the primary reason the Soviet Union abandoned the rights and interests in the CCR was to establish Sino-Soviet friendship on a reliable basis and turn China into a Soviet strategic ally in the Far East." The return of the railway property, no matter the costs or benefits, effectively established mutual trust between the two nations, cementing their alliance. Zhou Enlai summed up at the handover ceremony:

"The Soviet government fulfills generously and selflessly its obligations which it shoulders. This shows that the Soviet government is infinite loyal to the fraternal Sino-Soviet cause... The great friendship between China and the Soviet Union becomes more consolidated and developed."

The return of the CCR laid the basis for future Sino-Soviet cooperation. In the years following the handover, the CPC emphasized the friendly relationship between the two communist powers and how China should learn from the Soviet Union. The phrase "the Soviet Today is China's Tomorrow" was repeated all across China as the new nation developed in the model of the USSR. The trust required to follow the "Big Brother" Soviet Union had been firmly established with the handover of the CCR and now spread into all sectors of the alliance. In the development of the modern China National Railways, the Soviet model and CCR were broadcast as an example for all railroad development:

"Learning from and the promotion of the CCR's experience is to substantively carry out socialist transformation of the national railway in operation and management. It must be recognized that... the CCR is an advanced example, which is created with the help of more than 1500 Soviet experts, and with the use of Soviet advanced experience, and according to China's railroad special situation. With the help of Soviet experts stationed in China's Ministry of Railways, the CCR's experience has been consolidated, therefore the national railroad must learn from the CCR."
— Chinese Ministry of Railways (1954)

As the China National Railways continued to develop along Soviet lines, the CCR would be touted as the model railway, showcasing the productivity and high-technology of a modern Soviet-style railroad. Furthermore, the entire management of all other railway bureaus, and even the management of the Ministry of Railways would follow the Soviet example as embodied in the CCR. It would be this management model that the China National Railways follow under the First Five Year Plan.

=== Impacts on the PRC ===
The political impacts of the return of the Chinese Changchun Railway were widespread and reflected several issues of the era. According to historian Zhang Shengfa, the return of this property "removed the fetters imposed on China by the Yalta Agreement and the Sino-Soviet agreements in 1945, obtaining territorial integrity, full Chinese sovereignty, and reviving the national self-esteem and self-confidence of the Chinese people." The return of the railway finally ended the era of foreign railway ownership which had lasted since the first railway was built by British interests in 1876. The CPC could be proud of this achievement and rightly so, as they had regained a piece of property of immense significance. By connecting Manchuria to the rest of China, as well as to two points of the Soviet Railway system, the Chinese Changchun railway was of political, economic, and strategic importance. This railway was crucial in connecting the PLA to China's borders, enhancing national security. In terms of political significance, not only did the CPC gain legitimacy by ending unequal ownership, but also they gained control over all transportation in Manchuria, solidifying their new national railway network.

Furthermore, the cementing of the Sino-Soviet alliance through the CCR would be extremely beneficial for the new nation. The Sino-Soviet alliance guaranteed China a superpower ally in an era when it was directly fighting the United States in Korea. By controlling the railway, the PRC gained total control of a very strategic part of China, as not only did the CPC control the land but also all of the ways of communication. This monopoly on the logistical lines and lines of communication gave the CPC the means to begin its new agenda of development in Manchuria.

=== Impacts on the USSR ===
After the failure of the Berlin Blockade, Stalin had sought to strengthen Soviet alliances with friendly powers in other parts of the world, and had succeeded in this regard with the new treaty with the People's Republic of China. Stalin had shown that he was willing to give up Soviet rights to Manchuria in exchange for a military, political and economic alliance with the PRC. By making this alliance, Stalin gained a crucial geopolitical ally in a region where the US had allies in South Korea, Japan, and Taiwan. The timing of the handover also helped Stalin's further goals in East Asia. Stalin had been pressuring the Chinese to take a hard line in the Korean War Armistice negotiations in order to prolong the war in Korea. The war was becoming increasingly costly for the United States, and Stalin wanted to continue the war in order to weaken the United States further. Not only would a weakened United States present less of a threat to Soviet influence in Asia, but in Europe as well, where Stalin's real ambitions lay. The CCR became a form of payment for China's continued involvement in the Korean War and a demonstration that Stalin was a trustworthy and supportive ally. The return of the CCR was used to show the closeness of the Sino-Soviet Alliance to the outside world as well:

"We can see how scrupulously the Soviet Government abides by its international treaties and agreements. All rumors and attempts of imperialists to cause a rift in the Sino-Soviet relations are thus utterly crushed."
— Sino-Soviet Friendship Association, September 18th, 1952

On the Soviet side, it originally appears that returning the Chinese Changchun Railway to China weakened the USSR's position in China, and certainly hurt its hold on the Chinese economy. Moreover, it affected the thousands of Soviet citizens living in China and working for the CCR and associated properties. With the end of the CCR and the beginnings of Nikita Khrushchev’s Virgin Lands program, these Soviet citizens gradually returned to the USSR. Despite these side effects, overall the return benefited the USSR. Using the return of the CCR as a sign of goodwill, the Soviet Union also gained huge political capital and bargaining power with the new Friendship Treaty. To the outside world, the Sino-Soviet Treaty firmly put China in the Soviet camp for the beginning of the Cold War. In addition, the operation of the CCR was proving to be a financial loss for the Soviet Union, as it was not physically integrated with the Soviet Railway System, giving Stalin a good reason to return the railway sooner instead of spending the capital investments requested by the CPC. The CCR and CER had always operated at a financial loss for the Russian and Soviet Governments. Despite the many industries built along these railroad lines, the two international borders and break-of-gauge points were a huge operating cost for the Soviet Union. By transferring these operating costs to China National Railways, the Soviet Union was able to maintain trade access to China at lower cost. Furthermore, the CCR was significantly underdeveloped compared to the remainder of the Soviet Trans-Siberian Railway (which was being rapidly modernized after World War II). All of these factors combined to make returning the railway to China a cheaper bargain than upgrading and integrating the CCR into the Soviet Railway system.

Ultimately the strategic loss of the CCR was more than made up for by the strategic benefits of the new Sino-Soviet Alliance. These benefits were seen both immediately with the Korean War but also later with the increased trade and cooperation between the two nations.

=== Sino-Soviet split ===
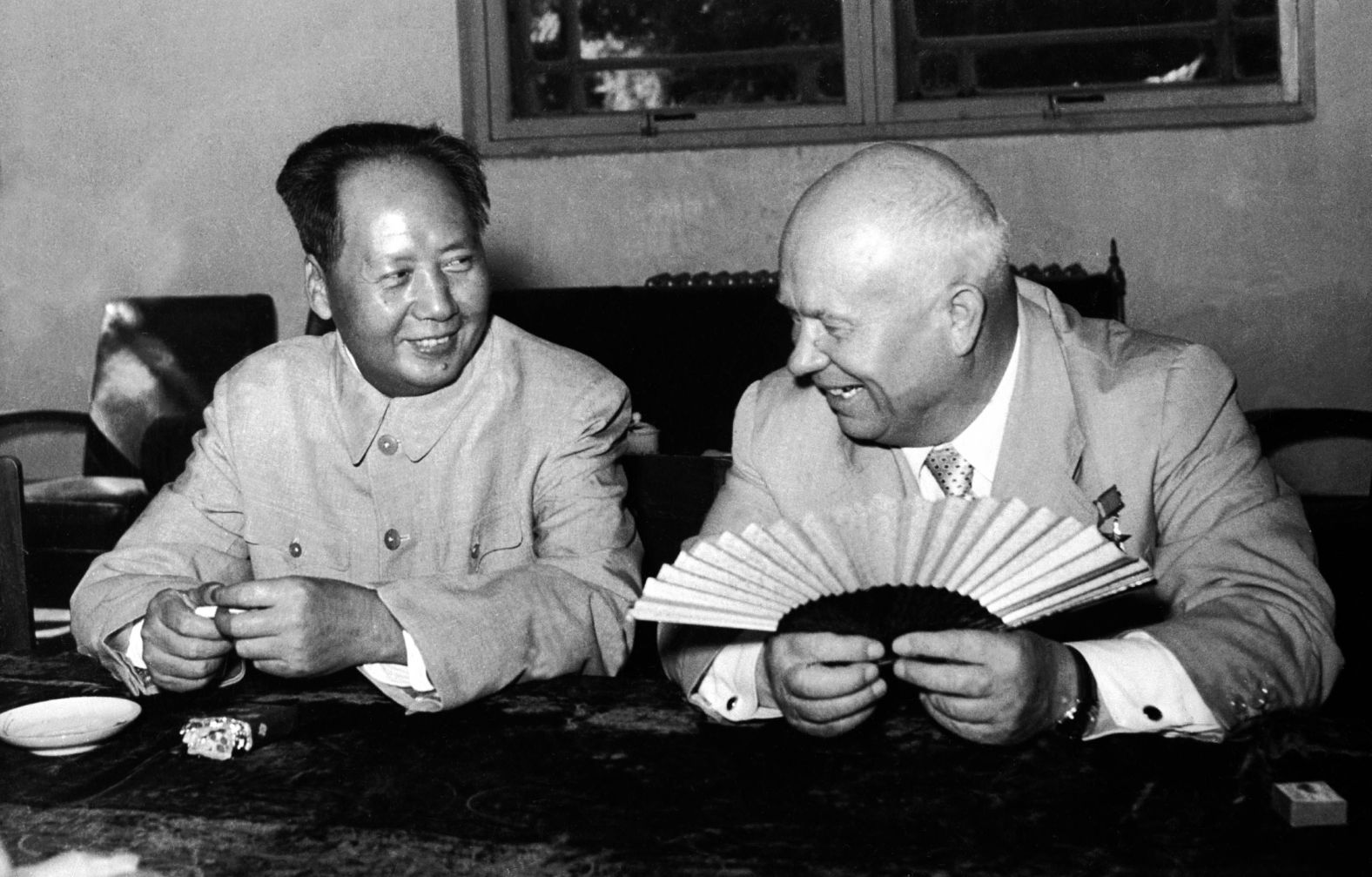
Mao Zedong and Nikita Khrushchev in 1958

The earliest disagreements between the Soviet Union and China were soon reflected in the CCR. With Khrushchev's Secret Speech and the slow deterioration of Sino-Soviet relations in 1956, China began to turn away from blindly copying the Soviet model. This extended to the former lines of the CCR, where the Soviet style of railway management was no longer directly copied. In 1957, the Ministry of Railways proposed that "learning and promoting 'the CCR experience' would no longer govern the way in which railways nationwide were managed." In September 1960, the Sino-Soviet economic alliance officially came to an end with the complete withdrawal of all Soviet aid and advisors from the PRC. Over the next decade, Sino-Soviet relations would continue to deteriorate until armed conflict broke out along the Sino-Soviet border in 1969. In 1970, the CPC released a booklet commemorating the 100th anniversary of V.I. Lenin's birth and condemning the Soviet Union for becoming another foreign imperialist power. The Chinese Changchun Railway played a tiny part in this as it had long been seen as an element of Soviet imperialism in China, even after it was returned to China in 1952. An indication of these feelings of animosity can be seen as early as 1953, when Peng Zhen said to the Soviet Ambassador to China, A.S. Paniushkin: "A majority of the intelligentsia in China openly refer to the Soviet Union as imperialist asking things like, why until now has the Chinese Changchun Railway been the property of the Soviet Union." The former Soviet ownership of the CCR, and the ports of Dalian and Lushun became one of the many examples used by China to portray the USSR as an imperialist power at this time.

As the Sino-Soviet split heated up into a border conflict, the CCR played a key part in moving troops and materials to China's important border crossings. China National Railways was heavily utilized by the PLA for defense during the tense years leading up to the Sino-Soviet Border conflict. This fact had been recognized as early as 1956, when the Soviet Union was building the connection between the new Trans-Mongolian Railway (operated integrally with Soviet Railways) and China National Railways. This connection was seen as important for defense as well as trade, because it allowed the Soviet Union to rapidly deploy troops to the Mongolian border.

"If we remember the differences in Russian and Chinese character, and between the personalities of their leaders, the paths to Communism may eventually follow separate courses, and these two territorial giants may even become hostile to each other. In that case China with its 600 million people and with a railway leading right up to the underbelly of the Russian Soviet Empire could become an actual menace and a threat to the Soviet Union."
— Victor P. Petrov (1956)

With the beginning of the Sino-Soviet border conflict in 1969, the railways along the two communist powers borders became hives of military activity. The PLA used the former CCR to move troops to the two border posts of Manzhouli and Suifenhe, as well as to the connecting railways to the battle sites on the Ussuri River. Meanwhile, as predicted by Petrov, the Mongolian and Xinjiang Railways shuttled troops to those areas of the Soviet and Mongolian borders. While battles did break out in Xinjiang and on the Zhenbao Island in the Ussuri River, the border clashes did not develop into a full-fledged war between the two nuclear equipped communist powers and eventually the border dispute was settled with the Sino-Soviet Border Agreement in 1991.

== Economic impact ==
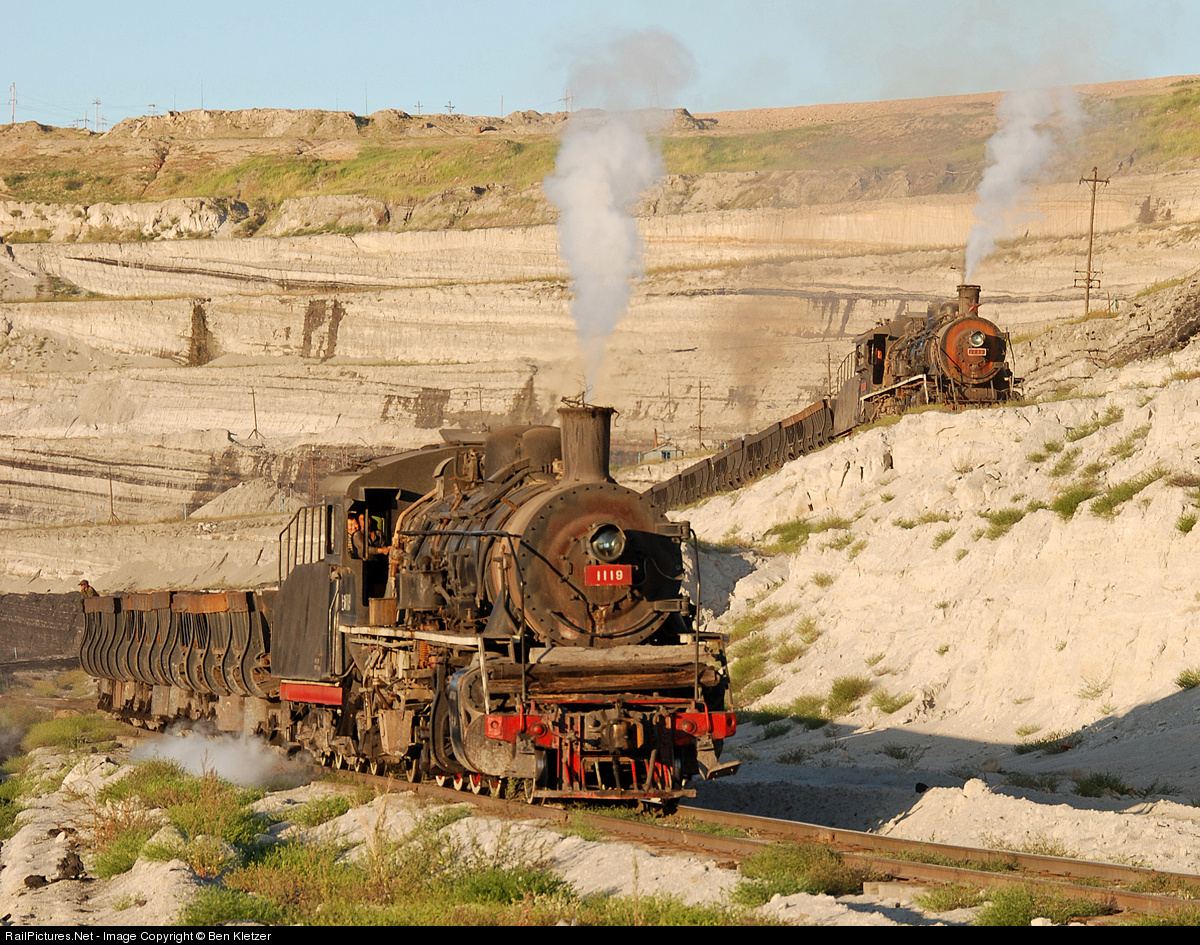
Jalainuer Opencast Pit Coal Mine was one of the two coal mines returned to China with the assets of the Chinese Changchun Railway.

With the return of the Chinese Changchun Railway, the People's Republic of China received all of the fixed and liquid assets of the CCR valued at 2.28 billion RMB or US$600 million. The fixed assets included 3,282.7 kilometers of railway lines, 10,200 railcars, 880 locomotives, 1.85 million square meters of houses, 121 medical facilities (including hospitals, clinics and vaccination centers), 69 schools, 25 cultural centers and railway clubs, and 322 "Red corners" (entertainment houses). In addition, China received all of the railway communication equipment (telegraphs, telephones, and radios), the electric railway signals, telephone office, and business buildings including the railway headquarters in Changchun, and local management buildings. The transfer also included the two electric power plants and power transmission equipment for the railroad. Moreover, the value of the CCR at $600 million was twice of the value of the original (1950) Soviet loan of $300 million for development. According to historian Zhang Shengfa, "these immensely valuable assets allowed China to enhance development of the railroad industry and economy, particularly in the Northeast region."

The Chinese Eastern Railway (including the South Manchurian Railway) carried almost half of all railway tonnage in China. As early as 1933, these two railway lines combined to carry 6,410 million ton-kilometers of railway freight. In 1952, the situation was the same with the Chinese Changchun Railway handling more than half of the 60,160 million ton-kilometers handled by railways in China. With the return of the CCR, all of this railway tonnage was now under the administration of China. The newly enlarged China National Railways continued to grow in traffic, carrying 134,590 million ton-kilometers of freight and 36,130 million passenger-kilometers by 1957. With the Sino-Soviet Alliance, the majority of all trade between the USSR and PRC was conducted via the CCR. This made the handover of the railway a huge benefit for the PRC, as they had total control of this railway traffic. At the time of the return, the Soviet Union accounted for 60–70 percent of China's trade with the outside world, and nearly all of this trade was conducted via the CCR. In the same year, "about 80 percent of East China's raw and processed silk, as well as 70 percent of the tea output in the Shanghai area, went to the Soviet Union and Eastern Bloc" via the CCR.

Outside of the railway equipment, as part of the transfer China also received the industrial assets of the CCR including two large coal mines at Muling and Jalainuer, and several forestry enterprises including tree farms and lumber mills along the railway. China also received the Harbin and Dalian locomotive and railway vehicle repair factories. The Dalian Locomotive factory, now known as CNR Dalian Loco, was significant as this was the main locomotive manufacturing facility for Manchukuo and was a modern facility, thereby allowing China to build its own locomotives. The Harbin repair factory was also immediately put to work, building new passenger and freight railcars for the entirety of China National Railways, and is now still in operation as CRRC Harbin Rolling Stock.

=== New industrial projects ===
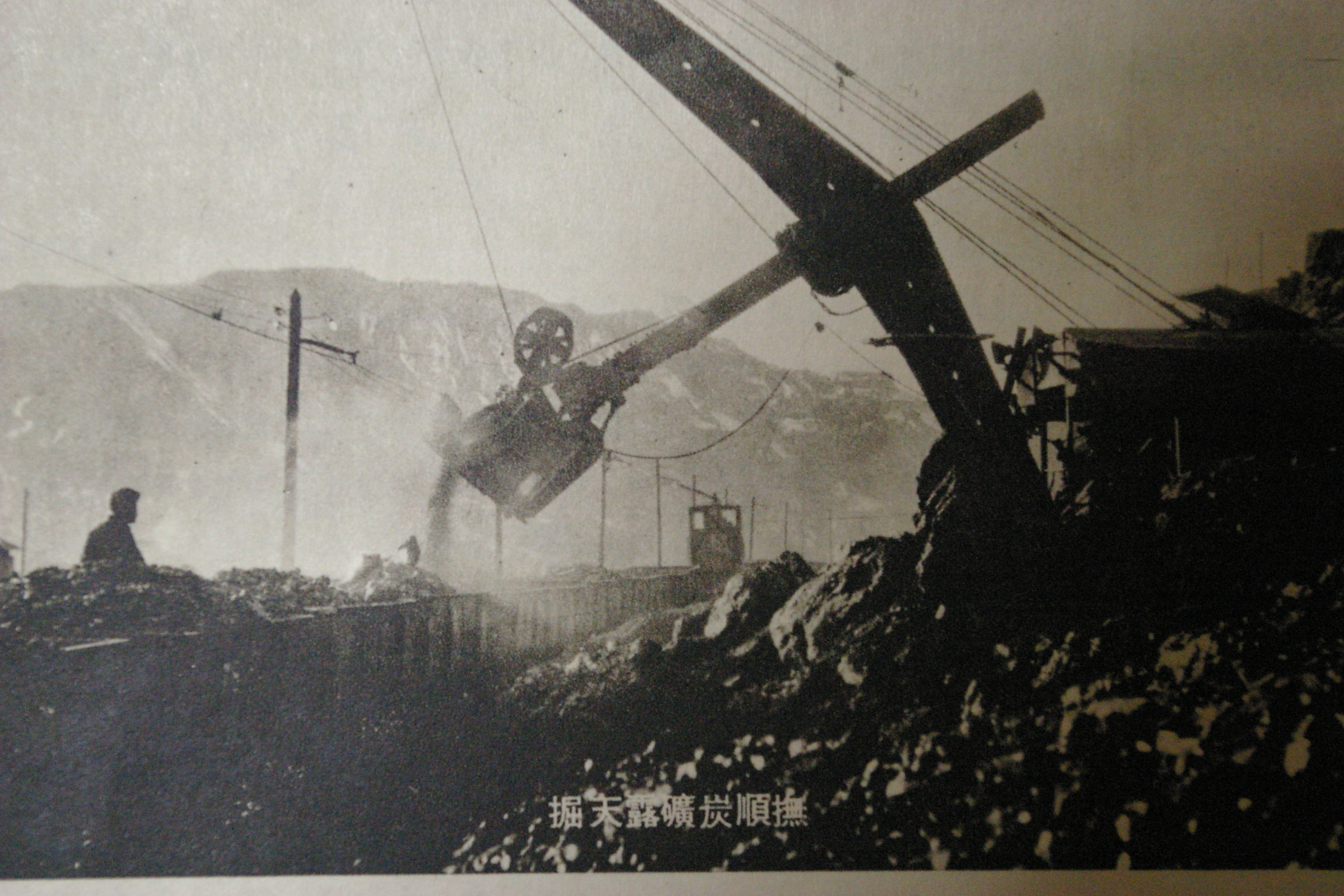
Fushun Coal Mine

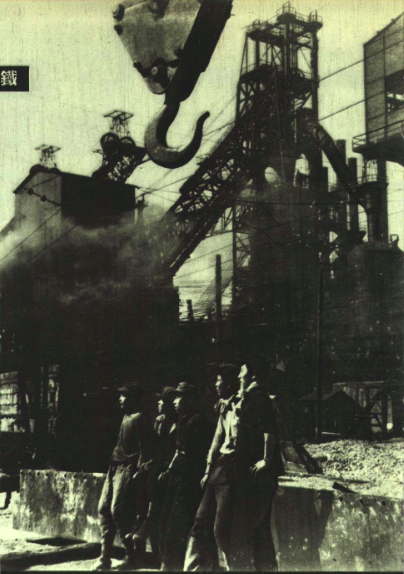
Anshan Steelworks

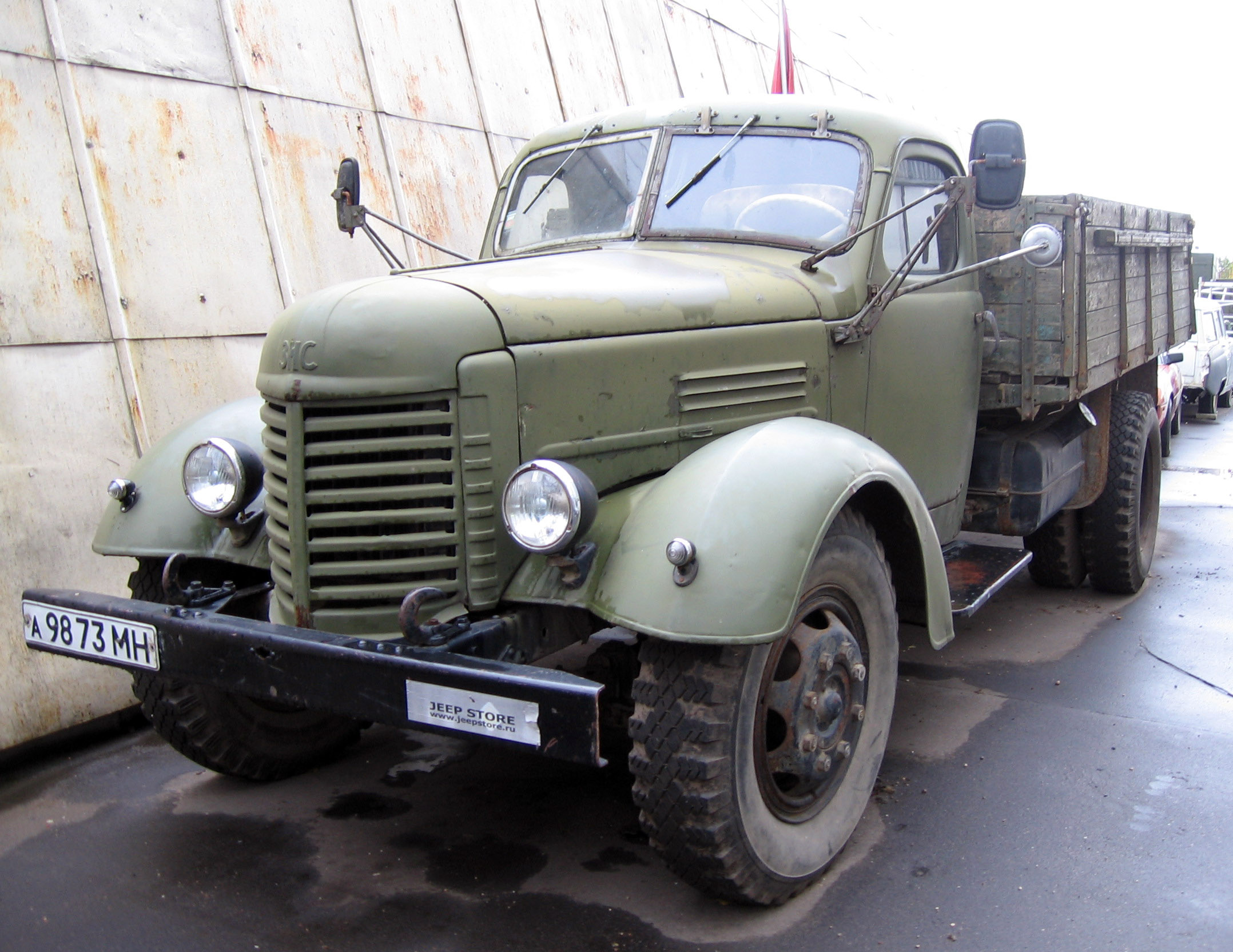
Changchun First Automotive Works JieFang CA–10

Alongside the return of the railway, the Sino-Soviet Friendship Treaty also guaranteed Soviet economic assistance to develop China, in the form of economic advisors and aid in constructing 156 major projects. Many of these projects were built along the lines of the former Chinese Changchun Railway, and their placement along this railway line was no accident, as the railway provided crucial transportation for these new heavy industrial enterprises. As a modern operating railway, the CCR provided a ready-made transportation network that connected raw materials, international borders, and ocean ports, all of which were required for the new heavy industrial enterprises. By fulfilling all of these preconditions, the Northeastern cities along the CCR became a natural site for new heavy industrial enterprises. Unlike many other areas of China, no new railway links needed to be built for the factories sited along the CCR. Furthermore, the important railway junctions and terminals of the CCR were focal points of the 156 major projects including the cities of Harbin, Shenyang, Dalian, and Changchun.

The Construction Projects during the First Five-Year Plan
| Project name | Construction Type | Location | Years Built | Size of Construction |
Coal Mines (25 projects nationwide) Total: 21,650,000 tons of coal mined and 9,500,000 tons of coal processed
| Hegang Dongshan Mine #1 | Modernized | Hegang | 1950~1955 | 900,000 tons of coal mined |
| Hegang Xing'an Tai Mine #10 | Modernized | Hegang | 1952~1956 | 1,500,000 tons of coal mined |
| Hegang Xing'an Mine #2 | New construction | Hegang | 1956~1961 | 1,500,000 tons of coal mined |
| Hegang Xing'an Coal Processor | New construction | Hegang | 1957~1959 | 1,500,000 tons of coal processed |
| Chengzihe Coal Washery | New construction | Jixi | 1957~1959 | 1,500,000 tons of coal processed |
| Chengzihe East Mine #9 | New construction | Jixi | 1955~1959 | 750,000 tons of coal mined |
| Fushun West Pit Mine | Reconstruction | Fushun | 1953~1959 | 3,000,000 tons of coal mined |
| Fushun East Pit Mine | New construction | Fushun | 1956~1961 | 7,000,000 cubic meters of oil shale mined |
| Fushun Longfeng Mine | Reconstruction | Fushun | 1953~1958 | 900,000 tons of coal mined |
| Fushun Laohutai Mine | Reconstruction | Fushun | 1953~1957 | 800,000 tons of coal processed |
| Fushun Shengli Mine | Reconstruction | Fushun | 1953~1957 | 900,000 tons of coal processed |
| Liaoyuan Central Mine | Modernized | Liaoyuan | 1950~1955 | 900,000 tons of coal processed |
| Shuangyashan Coal Mine | New construction | Shuangyashan | 1954~1958 | 1,500,000 tons of coal processed |
Oil Production (2 projects nationwide) Total: 1,700,000 tons refined
| Fushun Oil Plant #2 | Reconstruction | Fushun | 1956~1959 | 700,000 tons of crude oil refined |
Power Plants (25 projects nationwide) Total: 288.65 million kilowatts capacity
| Fushun Power Plant | Expanded | Fushun | 1952~1957 | 150,000 kilowatts |
| Dalian Power Plant | Expanded | Dalian | 1954~1955 | 25,000 kilowatts |
| Jilin Power Plant | Expanded | Jilin | 1956~1958 | 100,000 kilowatts |
| Jiamusi Mill Power Plant | New construction | Jiamusi | 1955~1957 | 24,000 kilowatts |
Steel Mill (7 projects nationwide) Total: 6,700,000 tons of iron 3,636,000 tons of steel 3,600,000 tons of steel wire/sheet steel
| Anshan Steelworks Company | Reconstruction | Anshan | 1952~1960 | 2,500,000 tons of iron 3,200,000 tons of steel 2,500,000 tons of steel wire/sheet steel |
| Benxi Steelworks Company | Reconstruction | Benxi | 1953~1957 | 1,100,000 tons of iron |
| Jilin Ferro-alloy Factory | Reconstruction | Jilin | 1953~1956 | 435,000 tons of ferro-alloys |
Non-Ferrous Metal Refineries (11 projects nationwide)
| Fushun Aluminum Plants #1, #2 | Reconstruction | Fushun | 1952~1957 | 39,000 tons of aluminum ingot 12,000 tons of aluminum |
| Harbin Aluminum Plants #1, #2 | New built | Harbin | 1952~1958 | 30,000 tons of aluminum ingot |
| Jilin Electric Wire Factory | New built | Jilin | 1953~1955 | 22,300 tons of graphite products |
Chemical Industry (7 projects nationwide) Total: 158,000 tons of synthetic ammonia 188,000 tons of ammonium nitrate
| Jilin Dye Factory | New built | Jilin | 1955~1958 | 7385 tons of synthetic dyes |
| Jilin Nitrogen Fertilizer Plant | New built | Jilin | 1954~1957 | 50,000 tons of synthetic ammonia 90,000 tons of ammonium nitrate |
| Jilin Calcium Carbide plant | New built | Jilin | 1955~1957 | 60,000 tons of calcium carbide |
Factories (24 projects nationwide)
| Harbin Boiler Plants #1, #2 | New built | Harbin | 1954~1960 | 4080 tons of high pressure boiler built per year |
| Harbin Instrument Factory | New built | Harbin | 1953~1956 | 100,000 electrical gauges, 50,000 sets of automobile gauges 600,000 electric meters |
| Harbin Turbine Factory #1, #2 | New built | Harbin | 1954~1960 | 600,000 kilowatts of turbines built |
| Harbin Electric Turbine Generator Workshop | New built | Harbin | 1954~1960 | 600,000 kilowatts of turbines built |
| Harbin Carbon Brush Factory | Reconstruction | Harbin | 1956~1958 | 100,000 tons of carbon brushes |
| Harbin Ball Bearing Factory | Reconstruction | Harbin | 1957~1959 | 6,550,000 sets of ball bearings |
| Harbin Measuring Tools Factory | New built | Harbin | 1953~1954 | 512,000,000 cutting tools produced |
| Changchun First Automotive Works (FAW) | New built | Changchun | 1953~1956 | 30,000 Jiefang model trucks built |
| Shenyang First Machine Tool Plant | New built | Shenyang | 1953~1955 | 4,000 lathes produced |
| Jiamusi Paper Mill (the only light industry of the 156 projects) | New built | Jiamusi | 1953~1957 | 50,000 tons of paper bags 60,000 square meters of netting |
| Shenyang Second Machine Tool Plant | Reconstruction | Shenyang | 1955~1958 | 4,497 sets of machine tools produced |
| Shenyang Pneumatic Tools Factory | Reconstruction | Shenyang | 1952~1954 | 20,000 pneumatic tools produced |
| Shenyang Cable Factory | Reconstruction | Shenyang | 1952~1954 | 30,000 tons of various cables |

The Chinese Changchun Railway was essential for the construction and operation of these new factories. Not only did the materials to build the factories, mines, refineries, and steel mills come to the sites via the CCR, but also the railway was essential in transporting the new labor base to these areas. Furthermore, all of the raw materials required for these new industries were transported to those factories by the CCR, and all of the production of these factories was sent to the rest of China via the CCR. Without the pre-existing transportation network of the Chinese Changchun Railway, none of these industrial complexes would have been possible to develop in such a short time span.

Harbin, as the former headquarters of the CCR and a major railroad junction was the site of intensive investment during the First Five Year Plane. Out of the total 24.85 billion devoted to capital construction in the industrial sector during the First Five Year Plan, 10.3% (2.56 billion RMB) was allocated to the 22 projects in Heilongjiang. Of these 22 high priority capital projects, all were located along the CCR, and 13 medium and large enterprises were built in Harbin City. These important factories included several important firsts for China: a boiler factory, a machine tool factory, an industrial instrument factory, and a turbine / power generator factory. These important heavy industries manufactured products that were necessary for all future heavy and light industries in the PRC, and these finished products were all shipped to their respective destinations by the CCR. By 1957, 79.6 per cent of China's total blast furnace capacity for making steel was located along the former CCR. This illustrates how crucial the CCR was in developing the new modern steel centers of the PRC; the modern transportation network made the cities along the CCR natural locations for capital intensive heavy industries.

=== Coal mines ===
The return of the two coal mines of Muling and Jalainuer provided the new PRC with needed resources. These operating productive mines helped the new nation get back on its feet and provided a model for future coal mine development. The Jalainuer Coal Mine located in Jalainuer District, only 30 kilometers from the international border at Manzhouli was an early development by the Tsarist Russian government. Coal was discovered here in 1905, and the mine was opened shortly afterwards. By 1933 when the Japanese government took over the Chinese Eastern Railway, the mine had grown into a 20 square kilometer opencast pit coal mine. In 1952, when the operation was returned to China as part of the CCR, the mine system had grown further into an underground mine complex and the opencast pit. The mines together produced over 1,000,000 tons of coal annually, making the return of this mine a significant economic benefit for the PRC.

Just after the Chinese Eastern Railway reached Suifenhe, massive coal resources had been discovered in Muling, (now known as Jixi). In September 1914, the Mixi Coal Mine Company was founded and began operation under joint Russian and Chinese control. By 1931, the output of the coal mines at Muling had reached 1.6 million tons annually. With the invasion and occupation of Manchuria by the Japanese, the coal mines at Muling were integrated into the Chinese Eastern/South Manchuria Railway corporate structure, which continued under Soviet control after 1945. With the return of the Muling coal mines to China along with other CCR properties, the mines became the Jixi Mining Bureau. The vast coal reserves at Jixi were seen as a key economic resource for China, and were completely reconstructed and expanded during the First Five Year Plan. Two of the 156 key projects of Soviet assistance were located in Jixi: the Chengzihe Mine #9 and the Chengzihe Coal Washery. These economic investments brought an immediate expansion to coal mining in Jixi as output rose to 5 million tons of coal annually by 1956. The mines at Jixi were the second most-productive in China at the time, making the return of this property a huge economic windfall for the PRC.

=== Daqing oilfields ===
In 1958, long after the return of the Chinese Changchun Railway, geological exploration crews discovered oil near Sartu, a small station along the western half of the Chinese Eastern Railway. These crews discovered that this oilfield, named the Daqing or Great Celebration Oilfield was the largest in China. Soon hundreds of oil wells were drilled and oil was transported all over China via the Chinese Eastern Railway. Not only did the railway transport the raw oil, but it brought in workers and technical supplies to Daqing. It is a happy coincidence that the largest oilfield happened to lie along the CCR, with the ease of transportation provided by the railway allowing quick and effective exploitation.

=== Military usage ===
Much of the troops and material for the Korean War traveled over parts of the Chinese Changchun Railway. The CCR connected to the North Korean railway system at several points, all of which were used during the war to supply Chinese and North Korean troops. The former CCR (originally SMR) line from Shenyang to Dandong was the most heavily used line during the conflict, so much so that it came under attack by the US Air Force. The Yalu River Bridges at Dandong were repeatedly bombed during the Korean War, with the older of the two permanently destroyed in February 1951. Despite these attacks, the CCR kept running throughout the Korean War, shuttling millions tons of munitions to the battlefields in Korea. Another impact of the Korean War was that the Soviet Union retained favorable shipment rights on the CCR until 1955 as a means to deliver aid to North Korea.

== Integration with China National Railway ==
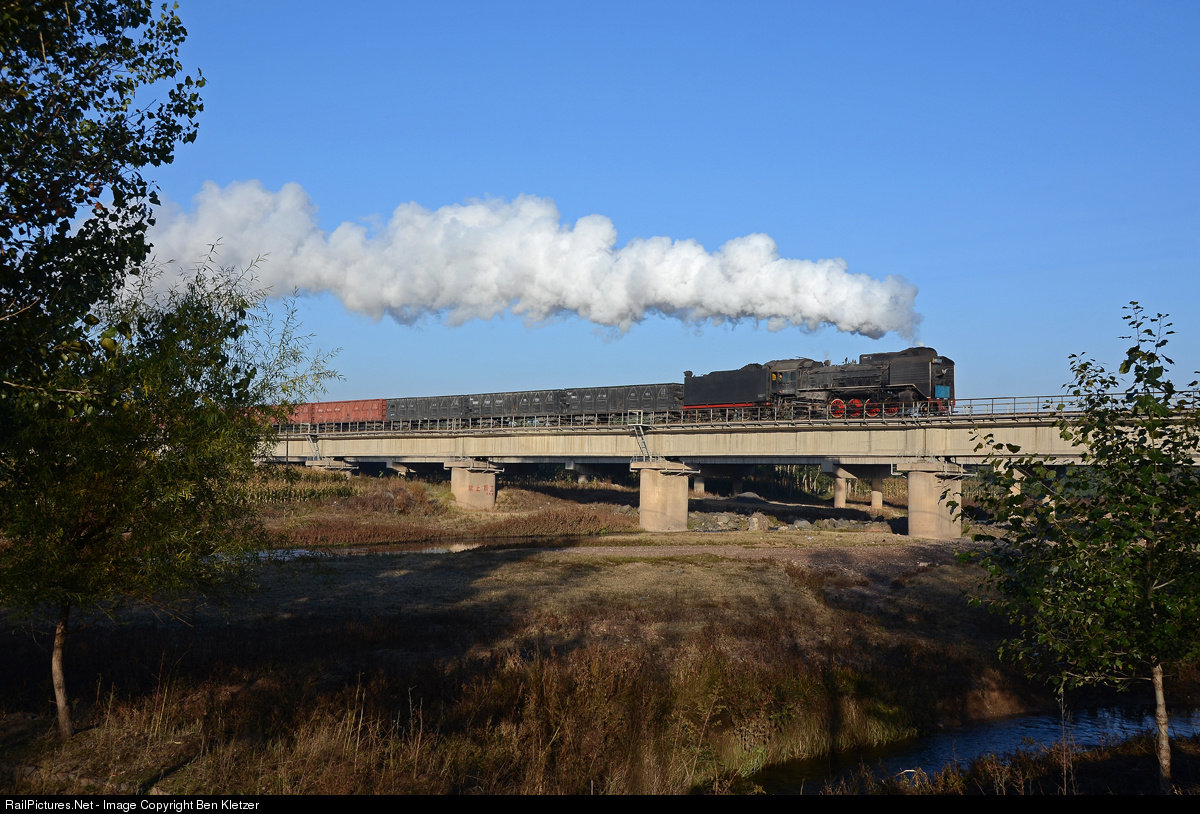
China National Railways JS locomotive.

With the establishment of the Harbin Railway Management Bureau on 31 December 1952, the PRC began to integrate the CCR with the national railway network, China National Railway (CNR). The first signs of integration were obvious as rolling stock and locomotives were repainted, as well as buildings and offices. The shipping, ticketing, and billing connections to the national network had been made under the joint operation of the CCR so these were also minor issues. A more major issue was investing and modernizing the entire railway system using Soviet technology imported following the Sino-Soviet Treaty. The properties returned with the CCR helped this process as the locomotive and rolling stock factories produced new equipment for the CNR. The Dalian locomotive repair factory immediately began building locomotives following Japanese designs. With the help of Soviet engineers, Dalian began to produce modern steam locomotives, such as the JS and QJ locomotives which helped power China National Railways for decades.

The Chinese Changchun Railway soon lost many of its Russian influences as it was integrated with CNR, however one Russian element reappeared in 1958. With the conversion of much of the Soviet Railway system to modern diesel and electric locomotives, the Soviet Railways had thousands of unwanted older steam locomotives. These locomotives, while old, were still very powerful and had many remaining years of use. In 1958, 1054 of these locomotives, class FD 2–10–2's were given to China National Railways. They were regauged from Russian gauge to standard gauge in Changchun and put to work on the Harbin Railway Bureau. Thus, former Russian locomotives came to work on a former Russian railway. By the 1970s, these older locomotives migrated to southern China, where they worked until the mid-1980s, when they were retired after more than fifty years of service.

To better manage the more than 3000 kilometers of railway lines, the Chinese Changchun Railway was divided into four separate railway systems which remained all under the administration of the Harbin Railway Bureau. These became the JingHa Railway, BinZhou Railway, BinSui Railway and the HaDa (Harbin–Dalian) Railway.

=== Chinese Eastern Railway today ===
Nowadays, the Chinese Eastern Railway forms an integral part of China Railways, and plays a key role in China's international trade with Russia and Eastern Europe. The two international railway interchanges with Russian Railways at Manzhouli and Suifenhe are heavily used with dozens of daily international freight and passenger trains. The CCR is also one of the main routes for Trans-Eurasia Logistics which connects Germany to China with daily container train service. On the passenger operations side, the Vostok (Russia Railway train 19/20, China Railways K19/K20) runs once a week from Beijing to Moscow via Harbin. In addition, the new Harbin–Qiqihar High Speed Railway, Harbin–Dalian High-speed Railway and the Beijing–Harbin High-Speed Railway parallel the CCR to connect those cities, operating trains at speeds unimaginable when the railway was first opened in 1901. The lines to North Korea remain contentious for China's international relations as the vast majority of trade between China and North Korea uses these railway border crossings (refer to the China–North Korea relations § Economic relations for more information).

== See also ==
- Sino-Soviet relations
- Sino-Soviet split
- Sino-Soviet Treaty of Friendship, Alliance and Mutual Assistance
- South Manchuria Railway
