= Tselinny Krai =

Tselinny Krai Целинный край (Russian)
- Krai of the Soviet Union
- 1960–1965
- Capital: Tselinograd
- History
  - Established: 26 December 1960
  - Disestablished: 19 October 1965
Preceded by
| Akmolinsk Oblast |
| Kokchetav Oblast |
| Kustanai Oblast |
| Pavlodar Oblast |
| North Kazakhstan Oblast |
Succeeded by
| Tselinograd Oblast |
| Kokchetav Oblast |
| Kustanai Oblast |
| Pavlodar Oblast |
| North Kazakhstan Oblast |
- Today part of: Kazakhstan

Tselinny Krai (Russian: Целинный край, lit. 'tselina krai', Kazakh: Тың өлкесі) was an administrative division of Kazakh SSR, Soviet Union from 1960 to 1965. A part of the Virgin Lands campaign, the krai comprised five oblasts of present-day Kazakhstan. Its center was in Tselinograd, which was formerly known as Akmolinsk. It was disbanded in 1965.

== History ==
Through the decree of the Central Committee of the Communist Party of the Soviet Union on December 26, 1960, the Tselinny Krai was created, comprising five Kazakh oblasts. The krai, which took up 21% of the Kazakh SSR land area and 31% of its population, was made as means of the Virgin Lands campaign.

1. Kokchetav Oblast, with its center in Kokchetav
2. Kustanai Oblast, with its center in Kustanai
3. Pavlodar Oblast, with its center in Pavlodar
4. North Kazakhstan Oblast, with its center in Petropavlovsk

Akmolinsk Oblast was disbanded, and its territories were under the direct control of the Krai. However, by 24 April 1961, it was returned as Tselinograd Oblast, with its center in Tselinograd.

The Presidium of the Supreme Soviet of the Kazakh SSR dedicated 13 cities to be under the Krai's direct control from 2 to 10 January 1963: Atbasar, Dzhetygara, Yermak, Kokchetav, Krasnoarmeysk, Kustanai, Makinsk, Pavlodar, Petropavlovsk, Rudny, Tselinograd, Shchuchinsk, Ekibastuz, as well as one industrial district, Jolymbet District (then Zholymbektsky). On December 17, 1964, they were transferred back under oblast and district control.

The Krai was de-facto led by the First Secretary of the Tselinny Krai Committee of the Communisty Party of the Kazakh SSR. Only two people held the title:

1. 1960–1963 – Tikhon Sokolov
2. 1963–1965 – Fyodor Kolomiets

A year after Nikita Khrushchev and Ismail Yusupov were removed from their positions, a decision by the Presidium of the Supreme Soviet of the Kazakh SSR disbanded Tselinny Krai.
