= Celina slossoni =

Scientific classification
- Domain: Eukaryota
- Kingdom: Animalia
- Phylum: Arthropoda
- Class: Insecta
- Order: Coleoptera
- Suborder: Adephaga
- Family: Dytiscidae
- Genus: Celina
- Species: C. slossoni

Binomial name
- Celina slossoni Mutchler, 1918

Species of beetle

Celina slossoni is a species of predaceous diving beetle in the family Dytiscidae. It is found in North America.
