= T-Beauty =

Beauty products of Taiwan

T-Beauty, or Taiwanese Beauty, refers to beauty products and routines associated with Taiwan.

== Overview ==
According to NBC "Taiwanese beauty movement focuses on a simple, holistic approach to skin care by using high-quality, natural ingredients and techniques rooted in traditional Chinese medicine." It is also influenced by Taiwan's warm climate with a resulting emphasis on hydrating and lightweight products.

In general it includes four steps: cleanse, tone, moisturize and sheet mask.

== History ==
The Taiwanese cosmetics industry got its start doing contract manufacturing for Japanese firms like Shiseido and the Kao Corporation.

In the 2000s Taiwanese companies began exporting products under their own name. Early successful brands include Cellina, Dr. Wu Skincare, Kuan Yuan Lian, My Beauty Diary, Neogence, Annie's Way, and Maskingdom.

== Industry ==
Taiwan banned cosmetic testing on animals in 2016.

In 2017 Taiwan exported $730 million worth of cosmetics.

=== Organization ===
The Taiwan Beauty Alliance is an industry organizing group. It consists of 11 Taiwanese brands.

=== Future potential ===
Industry experts have noted that T-Beauty has the ingredients for global appeal: innovative formulations, high manufacturing standards, and integration with beauty tech. Brands like Perfect Corp have pioneered digital beauty solutions that appeal to global consumers, particularly in virtual try-on and AR skincare diagnostics.

However, challenges remain. T-Beauty lacks the strong government-backed cultural branding campaigns seen in K-Beauty, and many Taiwanese brands remain relatively unknown outside Asia. Analysts believe that for T-Beauty to rise as a dominant force, companies must invest in global storytelling, influencer marketing, and build a more unified identity abroad.

== See also ==
- K-beauty
- Gua sha
