= Xinghua Subdistrict, Jixi =

Xinghua Subdistrict 杏花街道
- Subdistrict
- Location in Heilongjiang Xinghua (China)
- Coordinates: 45°19′28″N 131°06′30″E
- Country: People's Republic of China
- Province: Heilongjiang
- Prefecture-level city: Jixi
- District: Chengzihe
- Village-level divisions: 2 residential communities
- Elevation: 230 m (750 ft)
- Time zone: UTC+8 (China Standard)
- Area code: 0467

Xinghua Subdistrict (Chinese: 杏花街道; pinyin: Xìnghuā Jiēdào; lit. 'apricot blossom') is a subdistrict of Chengzihe District, in the northeastern suburbs of Jixi, Heilongjiang, People's Republic of China. As of 2011, it has two residential communities (社区) under its administration.

== See also ==
- List of township-level divisions of Heilongjiang
