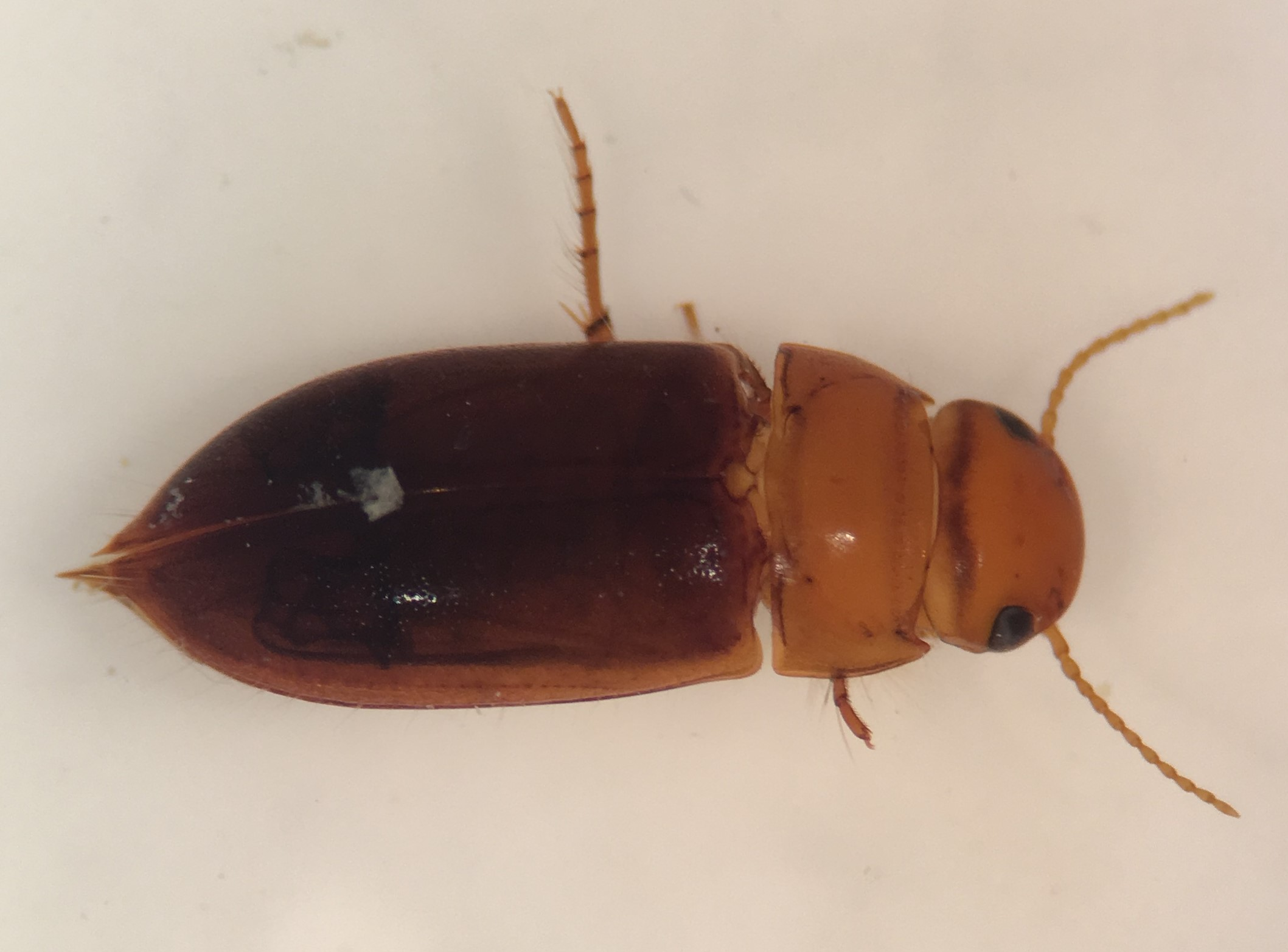

Scientific classification
- Domain: Eukaryota
- Kingdom: Animalia
- Phylum: Arthropoda
- Class: Insecta
- Order: Coleoptera
- Suborder: Adephaga
- Family: Dytiscidae
- Genus: Celina
- Species: C. imitatrix

Binomial name
- Celina imitatrix Young, 1979

= Celina imitatrix =

Species of beetle

Celina imitatrix is a species of predaceous diving beetle in the family Dytiscidae. It is found in North America and the Neotropics.
