= Brezhnev's trilogy =

Three memoirs published for Leonid Brezhnev

Brezhnev's trilogy (Russian: Трилогия Брежнева) (1978–79) was a series of three memoirs published under name of Leonid Brezhnev:

- The Minor Land (Russian: Малая земля, romanized: Malaya zemlya, lit. 'Malaya Zemlya')
- Rebirth (Russian: Возрождение, lit. 'Vozrozhdenie')
- Virgin Lands (Russian: Целина, romanized: Tselina, lit. 'tselina')

As a part of the publicity campaign, Brezhnev was immediately given the Lenin Prize, the highest Soviet literary award, after publication of the trilogy. The books were also available as a Phonograph recording and there were plans to stage it in theatre, where Brezhnev's favourite actor Vyacheslav Tikhonov would have performed the role of Brezhnev.

The books became a butt of numerous political jokes. The public considered it extremely unlikely that Brezhnev, who was visibly senile by then and had severe trouble speaking, was the true author. Indeed, in the 1990s many theories about the true authorship came to light, most probably a group of Moscow journalists led by Leonid Zamyatin wrote those books. In summer 1987, the books were removed from bookshops and turned into waste paper.

== See also ==
- Malaya Zemlya
