= Čelina, Czech Republic =

Čelina
- Village
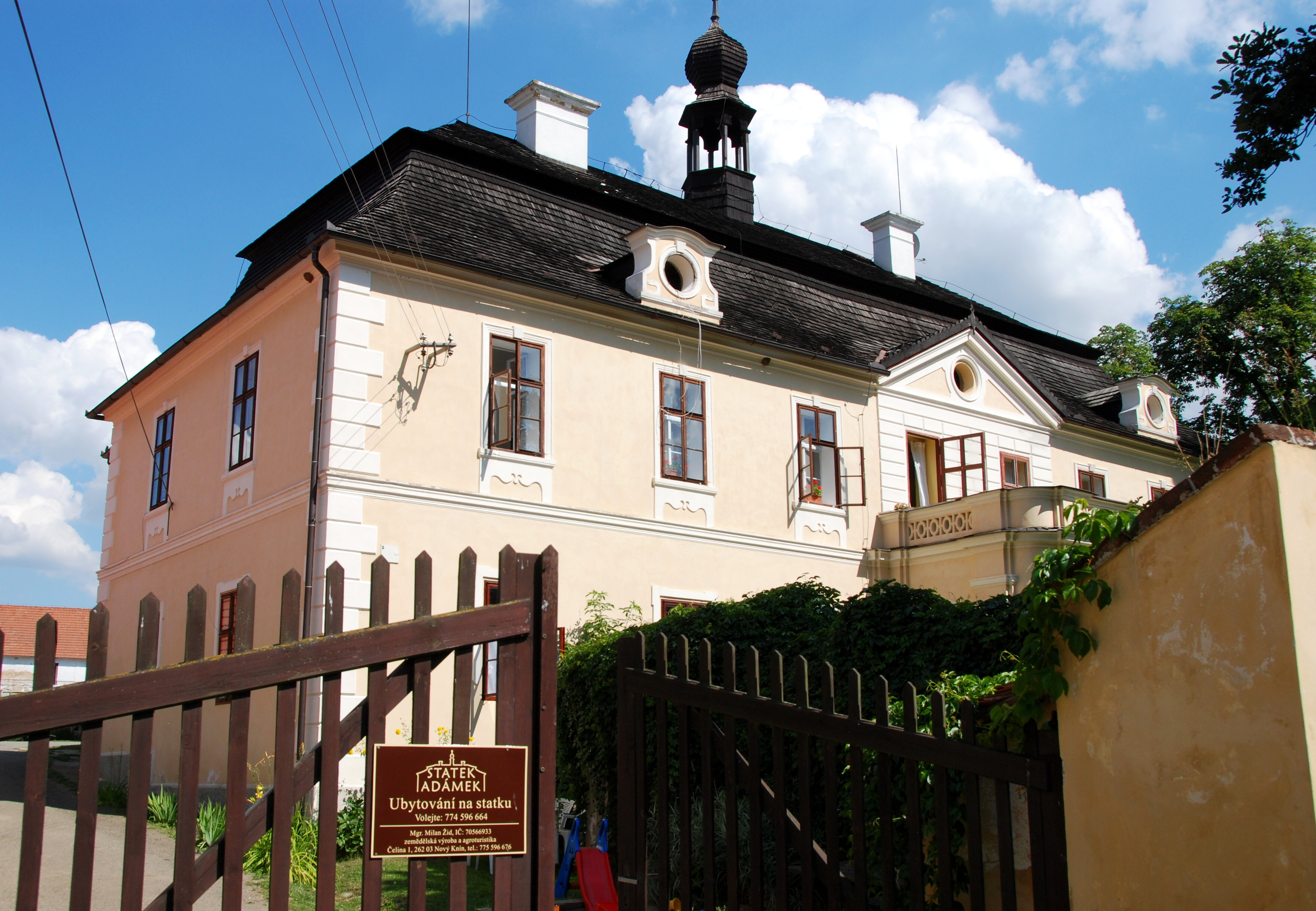
- Čelina Castle

- Location in the Czech Republic
- Coordinates: 49°43′55″N 14°19′44″E
- Country: Czech Republic
- Region: Central Bohemian
- District: Příbram
- Municipality: Borotice
- First mentioned: 1336

Area
  - Total: 5.48 km^{2} (2.12 sq mi)
- Elevation: 337 m (1,106 ft)

Population (2021)
  - Total: 111
  - Density: 20.3/km^{2} (52.5/sq mi)
- Time zone: UTC+1 (CET)
  - Summer (DST): UTC+2 (CEST)
- Postal code: 262 03, 263 01

Čelina (German: Tschelina) is a village and municipal part of Borotice in Příbram District in the Central Bohemian Region of the Czech Republic. It has about 100 inhabitants.

== History ==
The site at Čelina was historically a gold mining location, with archaeological studies at the mine retrieving materials stretching back to the 13th century. Since 1991 the mine has not been regularly used due to environmental concerns, despite the unusually abundant amount of gold inside.

== Demographics ==
Historical population
Year	Pop.	±%
1869	341	—
1880	358	+5.0%
1890	357	−0.3%
1900	285	−20.2%
1910	315	+10.5%
1921	280	−11.1%
1930	254	−9.3%
1950	140	−44.9%
1961	197	+40.7%
1970	156	−20.8%
1980	112	−28.2%
1991	81	−27.7%
2001	82	+1.2%
2011	69	−15.9%
2021	111	+60.9%
Source: Censuses

== Sights ==
There is a Jewish cemetery in the village, founded in the 18th century. The settlement used to have a Jewish community that began living in Čelina in 1830 and dwindled out primarily in the 19th century, and the last burial at the cemetery took place in 1918.
