= Cellina (disambiguation) =

Cellina is a Taiwanese skincare brand.

Cellina may also refer to:

- Cellina River, a river in Italy
- Calcare di Cellina, a geologic formation

== See also ==
- Celina
- Cellino
