= Celina hubbelli =

Scientific classification
- Domain: Eukaryota
- Kingdom: Animalia
- Phylum: Arthropoda
- Class: Insecta
- Order: Coleoptera
- Suborder: Adephaga
- Family: Dytiscidae
- Genus: Celina
- Species: C. hubbelli

Binomial name
- Celina hubbelli Young, 1979

Species of beetle

Celina hubbelli is a species of predaceous diving beetle in the family Dytiscidae. It is found in North America.
