= Jewish Cemetery in Čelina =

Cemetery in the Czech Republic

Coordinates: 49°43′44″N 14°19′10″E

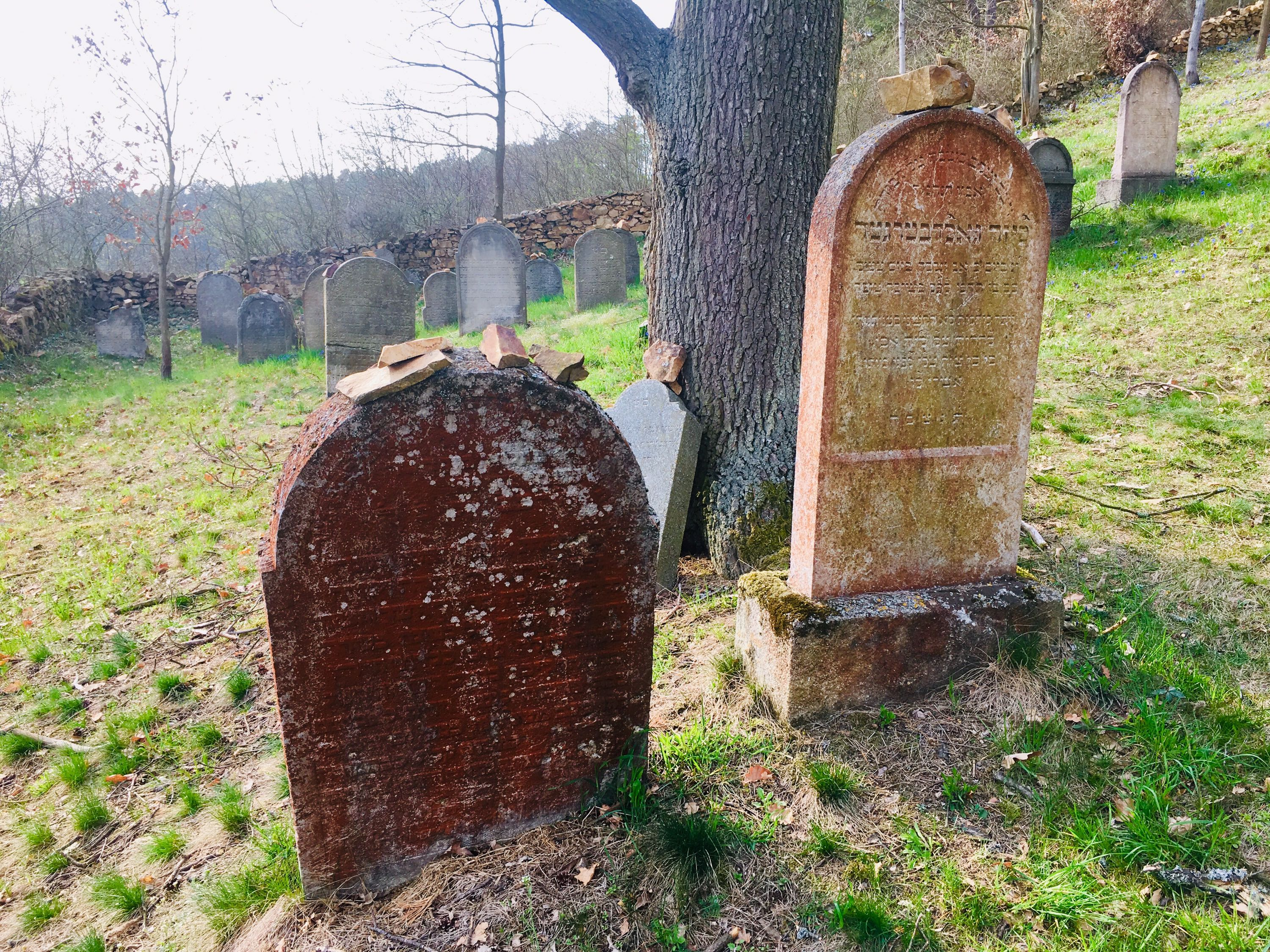
Row of tombstones at the Čelina cemetery

The Čelina Jewish Cemetery (Czech: Židovský hřbitov v Čelině) is located southwest of the village of Čelina (part of Borotice), on a slope at the edge of a forest to the right of the road to Cholín. Part of the route to the site leads through a fenced area for cattle. It is protected as a cultural monument of the Czech Republic.

The cemetery was founded in the 18th century, the oldest legible tombstone out of total thirty preserved dates back to the year 1803, the youngest one to 1918. The morgue and the wall are preserved only in the remains of the wall[4] which makes the cemetery freely accessible.

There is also a former synagogue and Jewish district in the village, numbering several original houses from the 19th century.
