= 2111 Tselina =

Stony asteroid in the outer asteroid belt

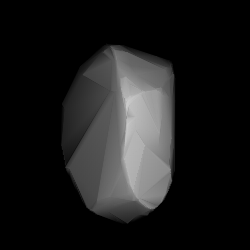
- Shape model of Tselina from its lightcurve

Discovery
- Discovered by: T. Smirnova
- Discovery site: Crimean Astrophysical Obs.
- Discovery date: 13 June 1969

Designations
- Named after: Virgin Lands Campaign (agricultural program)
- Alternative designations: 1969 LG · 1928 RS; 1928 SO · 1951 AR_{1} 1968 HB_{1} · 1975 RE; 1976 YF
- Minor planet category: main-belt · (outer); Eos

Orbital characteristics
- Epoch 4 September 2017 (JD 2458000.5)
- Uncertainty parameter 0
- Observation arc: 48.47 yr (17,703 days)
- Aphelion: 3.3041 AU
- Perihelion: 2.7299 AU
- Semi-major axis: 3.0170 AU
- Eccentricity: 0.0952
- Orbital period (sidereal): 5.24 yr (1,914 days)
- Mean anomaly: 318.00°
- Mean motion: 0° 11^{m} 17.16^{s} / day
- Inclination: 10.503°
- Longitude of ascending node: 167.17°
- Argument of perihelion: 232.54°

Physical characteristics
- Mean diameter: 22.773±0.247 km 22.830±0.208 km 24.54±2.8 km 33.02±0.64 km
- Synodic rotation period: 6.563±0.001 h
- Geometric albedo: 0.130±0.006; 0.1938±0.054; 0.2258±0.0251; 0.226±0.027
- Spectral type: Tholen = S · S B–V = 0.799; U–B = 0.463
- Absolute magnitude (H): 10.45 · 10.730±0.001 (R)

2111 Tselina (prov. designation: 1969 LG) is a stony Eos asteroid from the outer regions of the asteroid belt. It was discovered on 13 June 1969, by Soviet astronomer Tamara Smirnova at Crimean Astrophysical Observatory in Nauchnij, on the Crimean peninsula. The S-type asteroid has a rotation period of 6.6 hours and measures approximately 23 kilometers (14 miles) in diameter. It was later named after the Soviet Virgin Lands Campaign.

== Orbit and classification ==
Tselina is a member of the Eos family (606), the largest asteroid family in the outer main belt consisting of nearly 10,000 asteroids. It orbits the Sun at a distance of 2.7–3.3 AU once every 5 years and 3 months (1,914 days). Its orbit has an eccentricity of 0.10 and an inclination of 11° with respect to the ecliptic. In 1929, Tselina was first observed as 1928 RS and 1928 SO by the German and Belgian observatories at Hamburg and Uccle, respectively. The body's observation arc begins at the discovering observatory in 1968, or one year prior to its official discovery.

== Naming ==
This minor planet was named after the tselina lands to commemorate the 25th anniversary of the Soviet Virgin Lands Campaign. The campaign was launched by Nikita Khrushchev in 1953, with the intention to significantly increase the agricultural production in the USSR. The word "tselina" (or tseliny) means "virgin soil". The official naming citation was published by the Minor Planet Center on 1 April 1980 (M.P.C. 5283).

== Physical characteristics ==
In the Tholen classification, Tselina is a common, stony S-type asteroid.

=== Rotation period ===
In September 2001, a rotational lightcurve of Tselina was obtained from photometric observations by French amateur astronomer Laurent Bernasconi. Lightcurve analysis gave a well-defined rotation period of 6.563±0.001 hours with a brightness variation of 0.17 magnitude (U=3). In September 2012, observations by astronomers at the Palomar Transient Factory, California, gave a concurring period of 6.562±0.0021 hours with an amplitude of 0.29 magnitude (U=2).

=== Diameter and albedo ===
According to the surveys carried out by the Infrared Astronomical Satellite IRAS, the Japanese Akari satellite, and NASA's Wide-field Infrared Survey Explorer with its subsequent NEOWISE mission, Tselina measures between 22.773 and 33.02 kilometers in diameter and its surface has an albedo between 0.13 and 0.226. The Collaborative Asteroid Lightcurve Link agrees with the results obtained by IRAS, that is, an albedo of 0.1938 and a diameter of 24.54 kilometers with an absolute magnitude of 10.45.
