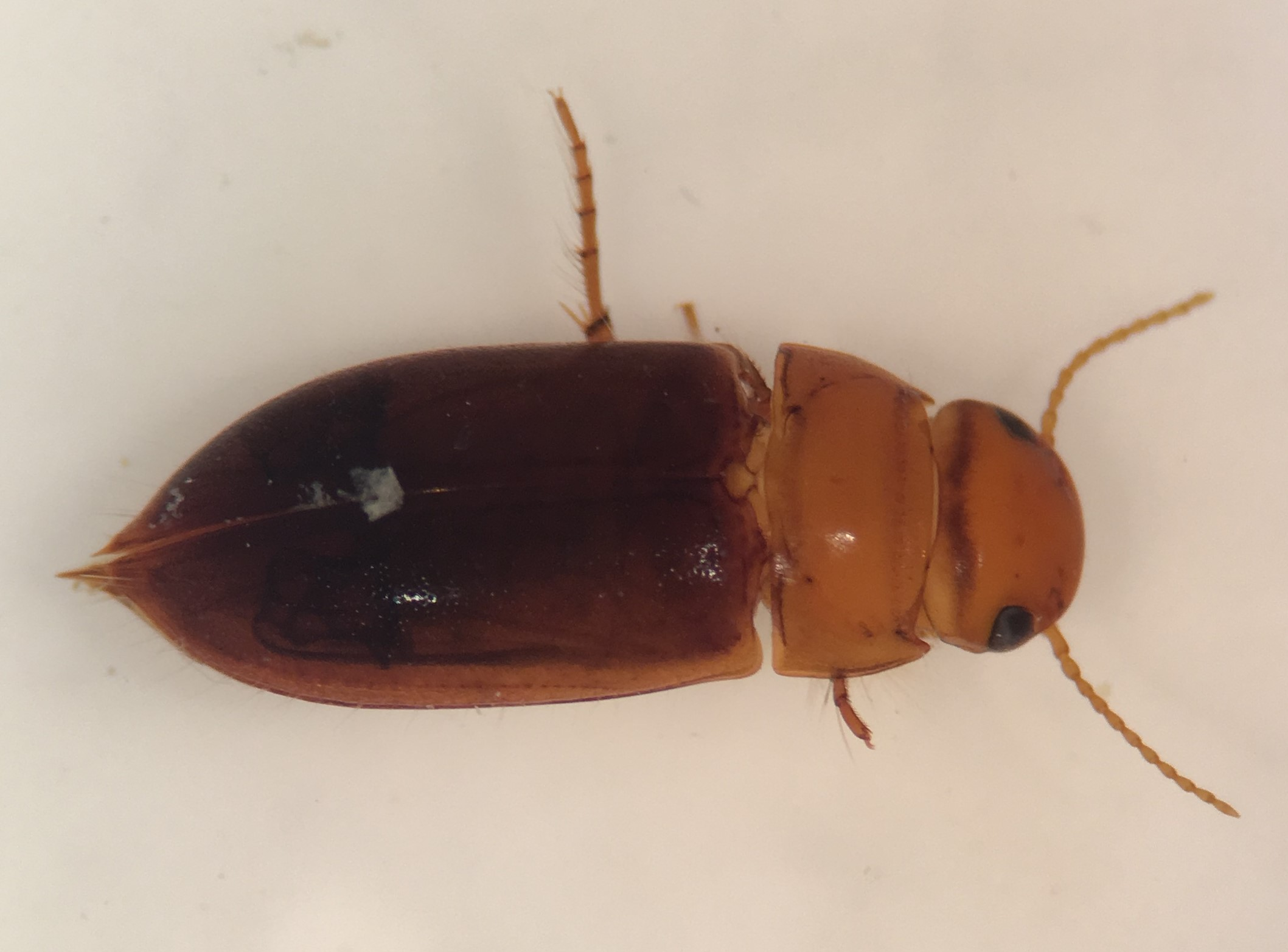
- Celina imitatrix

Scientific classification
- Domain: Eukaryota
- Kingdom: Animalia
- Phylum: Arthropoda
- Class: Insecta
- Order: Coleoptera
- Suborder: Adephaga
- Family: Dytiscidae
- Tribe: Methlini
- Genus: Celina; Aubé, 1837

= Celina (beetle) =

Genus of beetles

Celina is a genus of predaceous diving beetles in the family Dytiscidae. There are at least 30 described species in Celina.

== Species ==
These 34 species belong to the genus Celina.

- Celina aculeata Aubé, 1838
- Celina adusta Guignot, 1957
- Celina amabilis Guignot, 1957
- Celina angustata Aubé, 1838
- Celina bonvouloiri Sharp, 1882
- Celina bruchi Zimmermann, 1921
- Celina conspicua Zimmermann, 1921
- Celina contiger Guignot, 1947
- Celina crassicornis Sharp, 1882
- Celina cubensis Guignot, 1947
- Celina debilis Sharp, 1882
- Celina dufaui Legros, 1948
- Celina forsteri Guignot, 1957
- Celina freudei Guignot, 1957
- Celina gracilicornis Sharp, 1882
- Celina grossula LeConte, 1863
- Celina guayaquilensis Guignot, 1953
- Celina hubbelli Young, 1979
- Celina imitatrix Young, 1979
- Celina intacta Zimmermann, 1921
- Celina languida Guignot, 1958
- Celina latipes (Brullé, 1837)
- Celina longicornis Sharp, 1882
- Celina mucronata Sharp, 1882
- Celina muricata Guignot, 1955
- Celina occidentalis Young, 1979
- Celina palustris Young, 1979
- Celina parallela (Babington, 1841)
- Celina paulista Guignot, 1955
- Celina picea Sharp, 1882
- Celina punctata Sharp, 1882
- Celina reclusa Guignot, 1955
- Celina slossoni Mutchler, 1918
- Celina vitticollis Guignot, 1953
