= Cellina =

Skincare product brand

Cellina 雪芙蘭
- Product type: Skincare products
- Current owner: Shen Hsiang Tang
- Country: Taiwan
- Introduced: 1940; 86 years ago
- Markets: Asia
- Website: https://www.cellina.com.tw/index.php?lang=en&

Cellina (Chinese: 雪芙蘭) is a Taiwanese dermatological skincare brand owned by Shen Hsiang Tang.

== History ==
Shen Hsiang Tang was established in 1940 in Taiwan, early cosmetics production was assisted by the Japanese Pias Corporation. Shen Hsiang Tang's primary brand Cellina was introduced in 1973. The brand was created by T. Joseph Lin, the son of Shen Hsiang Tang's founder. Joseph Lin studied chemical engineering at UC Berkeley, the University of Washington, and Wayne State University and worked in the United States before returning to Taiwan to work at the family company.

In 2004 Shen Hsiang Tang retained The Interpublic Group of Companies to assist Cellina with entry into the Chinese market.

In 2016 Cellina and ten other Taiwanese skincare and beauty products companies founded the Taiwan Beauty Alliance. The purpose of the Alliance was to boost the profile of Taiwanese products internationally matching the success of other countries like South Korea.

== Market ==
According to the China Times Cellina is best known in Taiwan for its affordable price point and frequent product innovation. It is available in Taiwanese retailers such as Watsons and PChome. The brand is also popular with the Overseas Taiwanese and Chinese community in Canada and the United States. Taiwanese skincare and beauty brands including Cellina have had a difficult time breaking into international markets.

Cellina regularly exhibits at international beauty shows.

== Products ==
Cellina covers a wide range of products spanning facial care, body care, hair care, and sunscreens.

Popspoken compares the ubiquity of Cellina's classic cream in Taiwanese households to that of tiger balm among Singaporean ones and MOPIKO among Hong Kong ones. Made from camellia oil, lanolin and aloe vera extract, the Cellina classic cream is intended to act as a mild to rich body moisturiser.

The Sakura Body Cream is a lighter version of the classic cream launched in 2018.

== Facilities ==
Cellina is produced at Shen Hsiang Tang's two production facilities in Taichung.

== See also ==
- Kuan Yuan Lian
- T-Beauty
- My Beauty Diary
- Neogence
