= Chengzihe District =

Chengzihe District 城子河区
- District
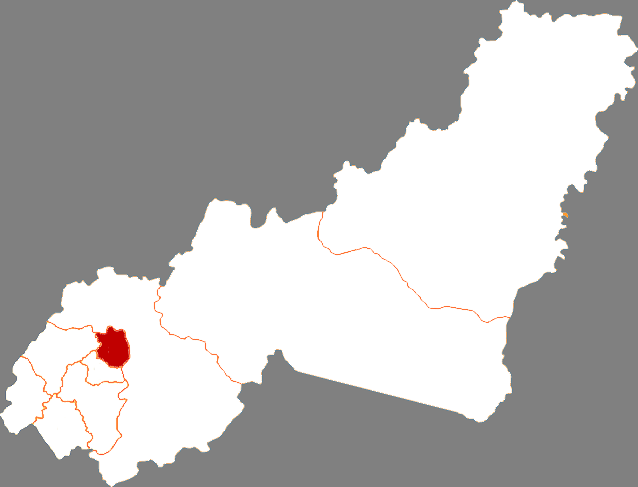
- Location of Chengzihe District in Jixi

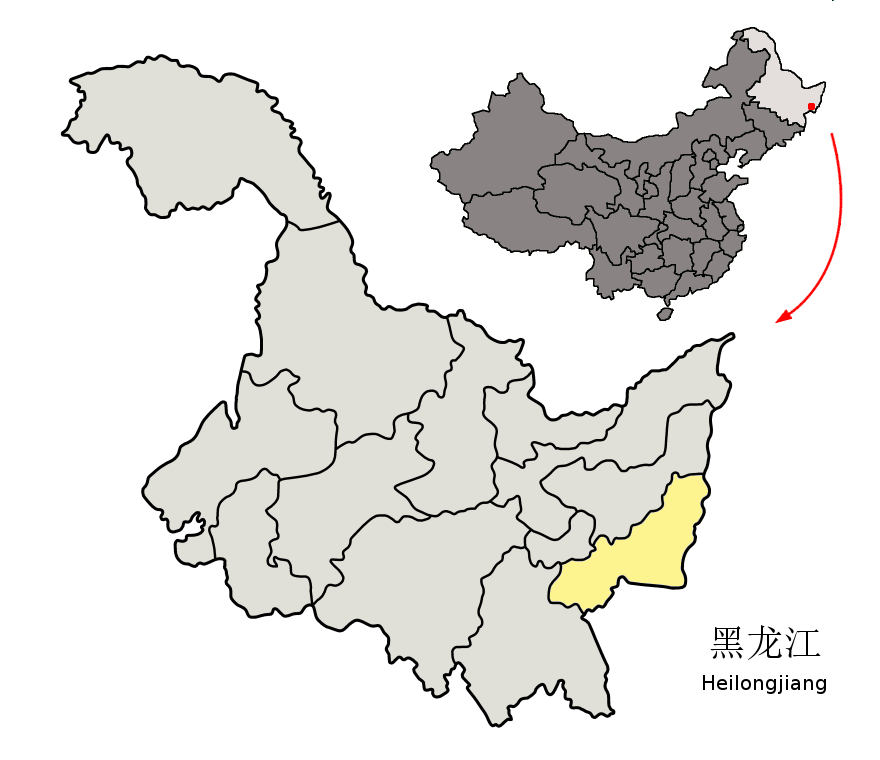
- Jixi in Heilongjiang
- Coordinates: 45°12′44″N 130°28′41″E
- Country: People's Republic of China
- Province: Heilongjiang
- Prefecture-level city: Jixi
- Township-level divisions: 5 subdistricts 1 township 1 ethnic township
- District seat: No.12, Zhengfu Road (政府路12号)

Area
  - Total: 320 km^{2} (120 sq mi)
- Elevation: 197 m (646 ft)

Population (2017)
  - Total: 145,000
  - Density: 450/km^{2} (1,200/sq mi)
- Time zone: UTC+8 (China Standard)
- Postal code: 158100
- Website: www.czh.gov.cn

Chengzihe (Chinese: 城子河; pinyin: Chéngzǐhé) is a district of Jixi, Heilongjiang, People's Republic of China.

== Administrative divisions ==
There are five subdistricts, one township, and one ethnic township in the district:

Subdistricts:

- Chengzihe Subdistrict (城子河街道), Chengxi Subdistrict (城西街道), Zhengyang Subdistrict (正阳街道), Xinghua Subdistrict (杏花街道), Donghai Subdistrict (东海街道)

Townships:

- Changqing Township (长青乡), Yongfeng Korean Ethnic Township (永丰朝鲜族乡)
