= Borotice (Příbram District) =

- Municipality
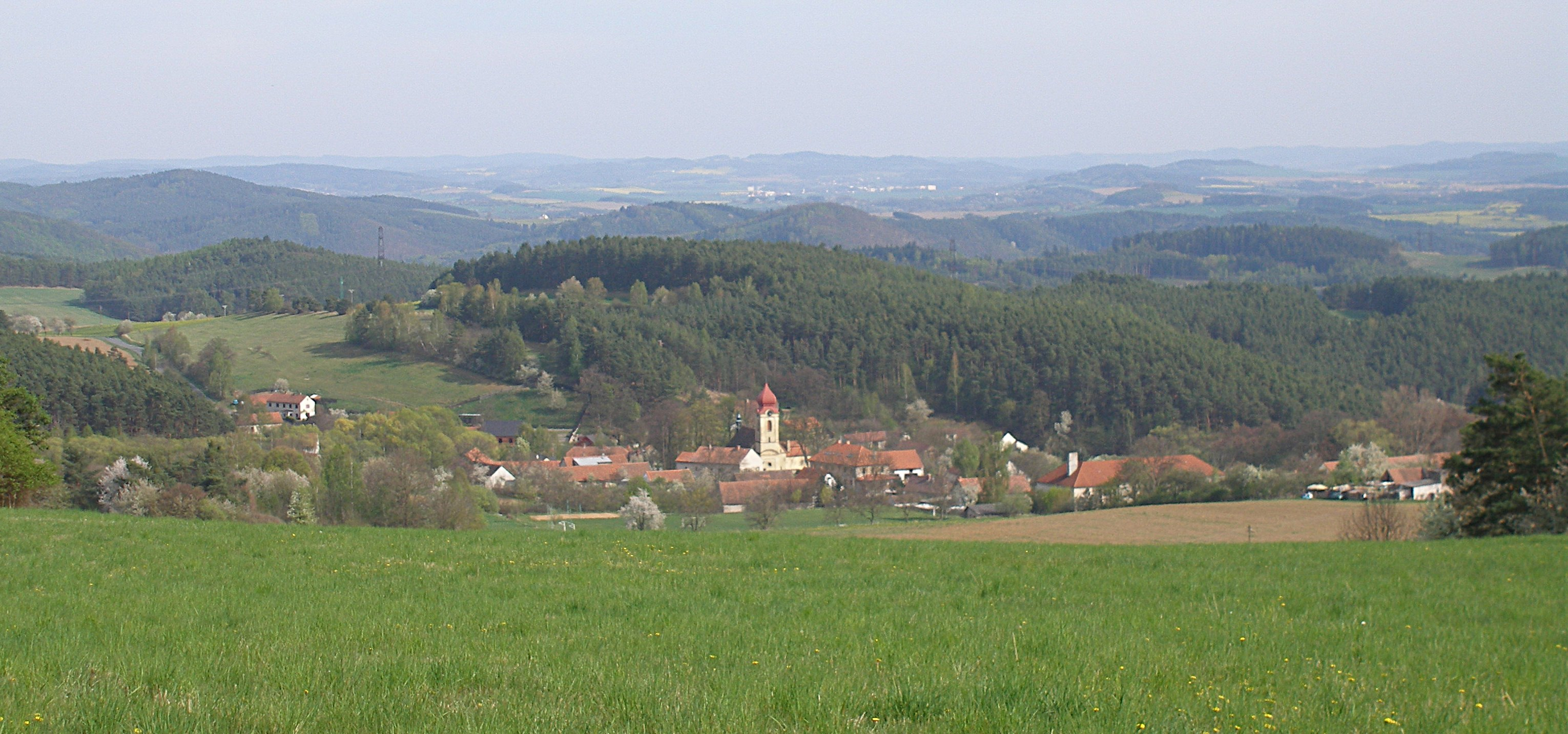
- View from the west

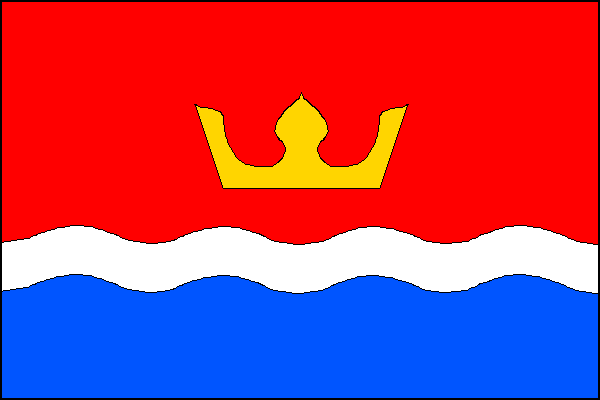
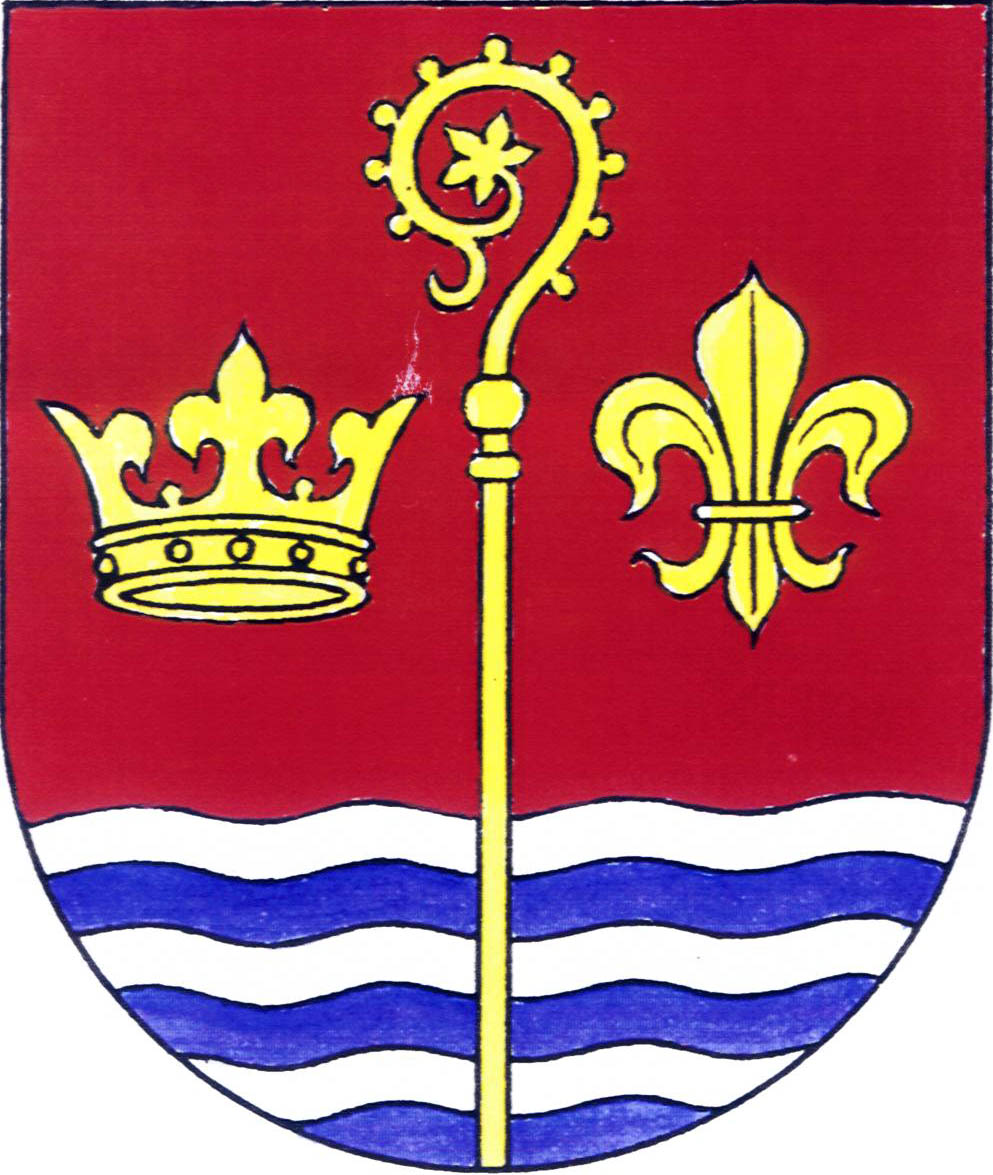
- Flag Coat of arms

- Location in the Czech Republic
- Coordinates: 49°44′6″N 14°16′47″E
- Country: Czech Republic
- Region: Central Bohemian
- District: Příbram
- First mentioned: 1207

Area
  - Total: 19.02 km^{2} (7.34 sq mi)
- Elevation: 388 m (1,273 ft)

Population (2026-01-01)
  - Total: 416
  - Density: 21.9/km^{2} (56.6/sq mi)
- Time zone: UTC+1 (CET)
  - Summer (DST): UTC+2 (CEST)
- Postal codes: 262 03, 262 15, 263 01
- Website: www.obecborotice.cz

Borotice is a municipality and village in Příbram District in the Central Bohemian Region of the Czech Republic. It has about 400 inhabitants.

== Administrative division ==
Borotice consists of five municipal parts (in brackets population according to the 2021 census):

- Borotice (144)
- Čelina (111)
- Cholín (25)
- Dražetice (83)
- Hubenov (71)

== Etymology ==
The name is derived from the personal name Borot or Borota, meaning "the village of Borot's/Borota's people".

== Geography ==
Borotice is located about 20 kilometres (12 mi) east of Příbram and 35 km (22 mi) south of Prague. It lies in the Benešov Uplands. The highest point is are the hills Čihadlo and Pod skálou, both at 528 m (1,732 ft) above sea level. The southeastern municipal border is formed by the Slapy Reservoir, built on the Vltava River.

== History ==
The first written mention of Borotice is in a deed of Pope Innocent III from 1207, when the village was owned by the Teutonic Order. From 1233, Borotice was a property of Agnes of Bohemia, who founded the order of the Knights of the Cross with the Red Star. This order owend the village until 1619. During the Thirty Years' War, the village was damaged and depopulated.

== Demographics ==
Historical population

Year	Pop.	±%
1869	1,003	—
1880	1,105	+10.2%
1890	1,115	+0.9%
1900	968	−13.2%
1910	1,003	+3.6%

Year	Pop.	±%
1921	1,001	−0.2%
1930	810	−19.1%
1950	637	−21.4%
1961	622	−2.4%
1970	500	−19.6%

Year	Pop.	±%
1980	408	−18.4%
1991	323	−20.8%
2001	322	−0.3%
2011	348	+8.1%
2021	434	+24.7%

Source: Censuses

== Transport ==
There are no railways or major roads passing through the municipality.

== Sights ==
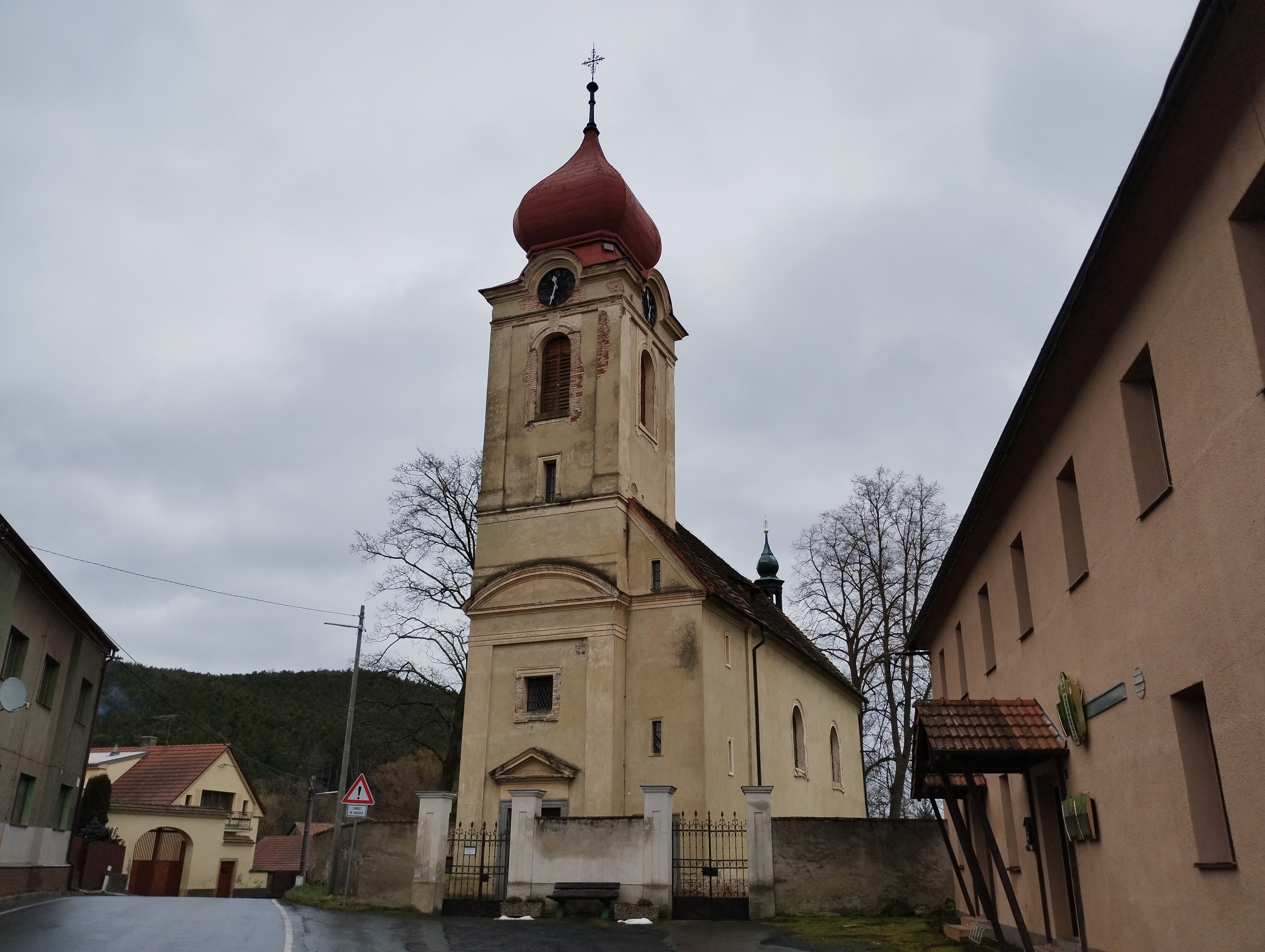
Church of the Assumption of the Virgin Mary

The main landmark of Borotice is the Church of the Assumption of the Virgin Mary. It was originally a medieval church, first mentioned in 1253. In the 17th century, it was rebuilt in the Baroque style. In 1897, the tower was added and Neo-Baroque modifications were made. The large area of the church includes a Baroque rectory from the 18th century, a morgue, farm buildings and an enclosure wall.

A notable building is the castle in Čelina. It was built in the Baroque style in the first quarter of the 18th century. After 1831, Neoclassical modifications were made. The castle chapel next to the castle was built in 1726–1727. The castle is inhabited by its owners and is not accessible to the public. The chapel still serves church purposes.
