= Virgin Lands campaign =

1953–63 Soviet agricultural production plan

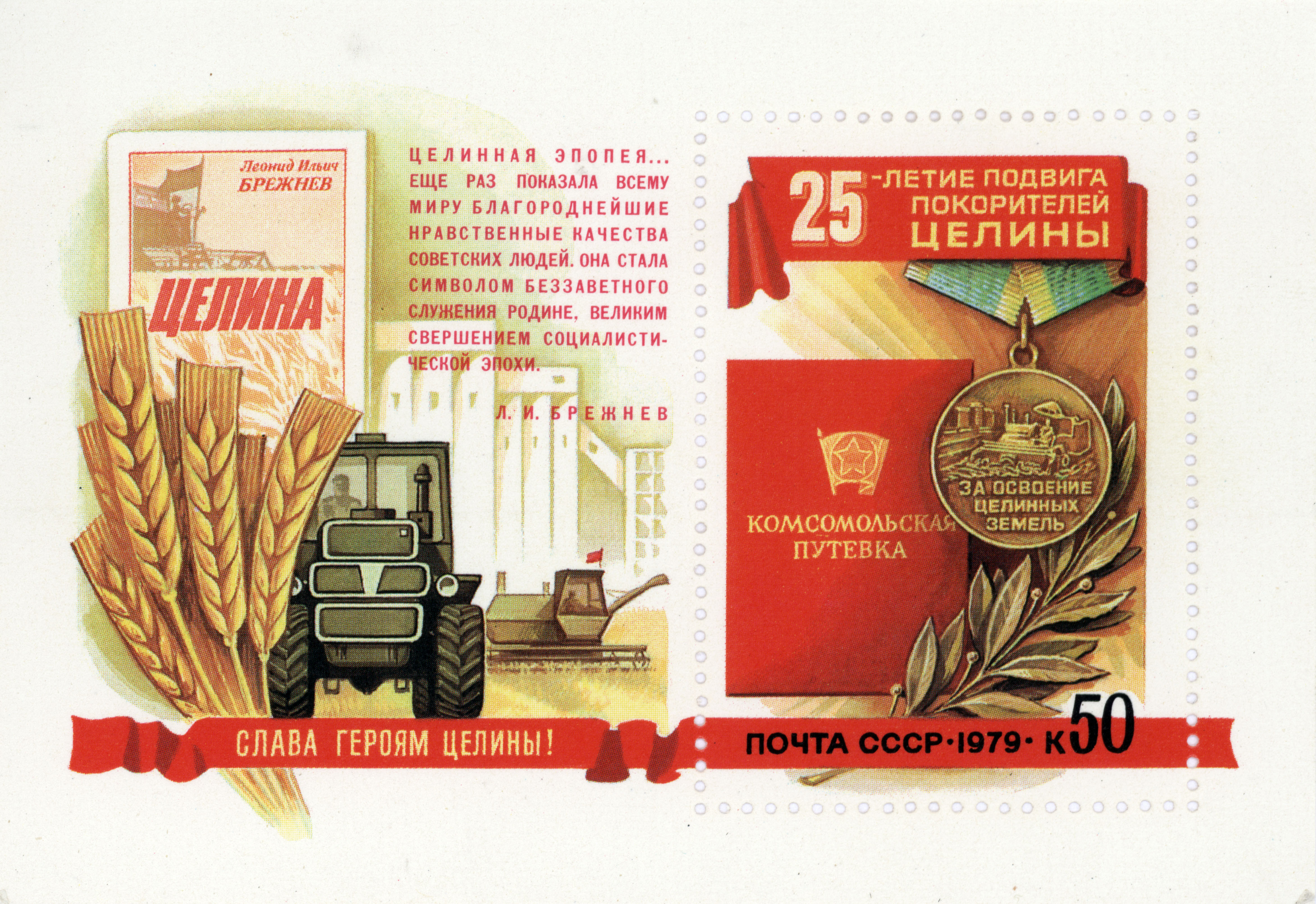
USSR postage stamp of 1979, celebrating the 25th anniversary of the Virgin Lands campaign

The Virgin Lands campaign (Note: Ukrainian: Цілинні землі, romanized: tsilynni zemli IPA: [tsʲi.lɪnˈni ˈzɛm.lʲi]; lit. 'virgin lands'; Russian: Освоение целины, IPA: [ɐsvɐˈjenʲɪje tsɨlʲɪˈnɨ], lit. 'Osvojenije celiny'; lit. 'reclamation of tselina'; Kazakh: Тың игеру, romanized: Tyñ igeru, IPA: [tə́ŋ iɟerʉ́w]) was Nikita Khrushchev's 1953 plan to dramatically boost the Soviet Union's agricultural production in order to alleviate the food shortages plaguing the Soviet population.

Hundreds of thousands of young volunteers settled and farmed areas of southern Western Siberia and northern Kazakhstan, which was known as the "Grey Klin", "Grey Klyn", or "Grey Ukraine", and considerably changed its demographics. While the scheme was initially successful, later the output decreased considerably, and the campaign led to an environmental disaster for Kazakhstan steppe due to significant soil erosion.

== History ==
External videos
- Soviet film about the development of Virgin Lands (part of a biographical film about Brezhnev)

In September 1953 a Central Committee group – composed of Khrushchev, two aides, two Pravda editors, and one agricultural specialist – met to determine the severity of the agricultural crisis in the Soviet Union. Previously, the Soviet Union endured a famine during the early 1930s. Earlier in 1953, Georgy Malenkov had received credit for introducing reforms to solve the agricultural problem in the country, including increasing the procurement prices the state paid for collective-farm deliveries, reducing taxes, and encouraging individual peasant plots. Khrushchev, irritated that Malenkov had received credit for agricultural reform, introduced his own agricultural plan. Khrushchev's plan both expanded the reforms that Malenkov had begun and proposed the plowing and cultivation of 13 million hectares (130,000 km^{2}) of previously uncultivated land by 1956. Targeted lands included areas on the right bank of the Volga, in the northern Caucasus, in Western Siberia, and in Northern Kazakhstan. The First Secretary of the Kazakh Communist Party at the time of Khrushchev's announcement, Zhumabay Shayakhmetov, played down the potential yields of the virgin lands in Kazakhstan: he did not want Kazakh land under Russian control. Molotov, Malenkov, Kaganovich and other leading CPSU members expressed opposition to the Virgin Lands campaign. Many saw the plan as not economically or logistically feasible. Malenkov preferred initiatives to make the land already under cultivation more productive, but Khrushchev insisted on bringing huge amounts of new land under cultivation as the only way to get a major increase in crop yields in a short amount of time.

Instead of offering incentives to peasants already working in collective farms, Khrushchev planned to recruit workers for the new virgin lands by advertising the opportunity as a socialist adventure for Soviet youth. During the summer of 1954, 300,000 Komsomol volunteers traveled to the Virgin Lands. Following the rapid Virgin-Land cultivation and excellent harvest of 1954, Khrushchev raised the original goal of 13 million new hectares of land under cultivation by 1956 to between 28 and 30 million hectares (280,000–300,000 km^{2}). Between the years 1954 and 1958 the Soviet Union spent 30.7 million Rbls on the Virgin Lands campaign and during the same time the state procured 48.8 billion Rbls worth of grain. From 1954 to 1960, the total sown area of land in the USSR increased by 46 million hectares, with 90% of the increase due to the Virgin Lands campaign.

Overall, the Virgin Lands campaign succeeded in increasing production of grain and in alleviating food shortages in the short term. The enormous scale and initial success of the campaign were quite a historical feat. However, the wide fluctuations in grain output year to year, the failure of the Virgin Lands to surpass the record output of 1956, and the gradual decline in yields following 1959 mark the Virgin Lands campaign as a failure and surely fell short of Khrushchev's ambition to surpass American grain output by 1960. In historical perspective, however, the campaign marked a permanent shift in the North-Kazakhstani economy. Even at the 1998 nadir, wheat was sown on almost twice as many hectares as in 1953, and Kazakhstan is currently one of the world's largest producers of wheat.

== Yearly Virgin Land performance ==
=== 1954 ===
A farewell ceremony for Komsomol members departing for Altai Krai during the Virgin Lands campaign from Kirovsky District, Leningrad Oblast at the Moskovsky railway station in Leningrad, 4 March 1954

The first Virgin Land harvest exceeded expectations. The total output of grain for Virgin Land regions in 1954 was 14,793,000 tons greater and 65% higher than the average grain yield for the period of 1949–1953. By the start of 1955, 200,000 tractors had been sent to the Virgin Lands, 425 new sovkhozy had been created, and a total of 30 million hectares (300,000 km^{2}) of land had been ploughed up, 20 million of which were put under crop.

=== 1955 ===
The 1955 Virgin Lands crop fell far below expectations due to a severe drought in the virgin land regions, especially Kazakhstan, which received only one-tenth of its normal rainfall. Even though the total sown area in 1955 was almost double that of 1954, the grain harvest went down by 35% from 1954 in Kazakhstan. However, other regions of the Soviet Union had a particularly good year, which offset poor Virgin Land performance and resulted in an overall increase in grain harvest for the Soviet Union. Khrushchev was forced to acknowledge the validity of some of the opposing viewpoints regarding the Virgin Lands campaign but he maintained that as long as two harvests in a five-year period were good, the plan would be a success in terms of recovering costs and making a profit.

=== 1956 ===
Enthusiasm over the Virgin Lands campaign dampened after the poor harvest of 1955. Much less new land was put into cultivation in 1956. However, the harvest of 1956 proved to be the most successful of the entire Virgin Lands campaign, and the largest harvest in Soviet history up to that point. Grain output for Virgin Lands regions increased by 180% compared to the average of 1949–1953 and 90% compared to the 1954–1955 average. The grain output in 1956 of the entire Soviet Union was 50% higher than the 1949–53 average. Encouraged by the success, Khrushchev went on a tour through the Virgin Land regions awarding medals to farmers.

=== 1957 ===
The 1957 harvest was a failure. Virgin Land's grain output decreased 40% from 1956, and 18% for the total Soviet Union grain output.

=== 1958 ===
In 1958 and 1959 there was almost no new land ploughed up in Virgin Land regions. The 1958 harvest was a particularly good one, reaching 58,385,000 tons of grain, only 8% below the record of 62,263,000 tons set in 1956.

Virgin Soil campaign participants of the Tanalyksky sovkhoz, Orenburg Oblast, during a meeting at a field camp, June 1954

=== 1959 ===
The 1959 growing season was extremely rainy, causing many difficulties. However, the harvest was not disappointing. The Virgin Land crop in 1959 was 54,571,000 tons, only 6% lower than the 1958 harvest.

=== 1960 ===
Tractors of the Peredovoy sovkhoz in East Kazakhstan Region during the Virgin Lands campaign, 17 April 1955

The two good harvests of 1958 and 1959 gave the campaign a new boost of support. 1,648,000 hectares (16,480 km^{2}) of new Virgin Land were plowed in Kazakhstan alone. Khrushchev organized one of the most important Virgin Lands regions into an administrative unit called Tselinny Krai, a territory consisting of five provinces in northern Kazakh SSR. The capital, originally Akmolinsk, was renamed as Tselinograd, literally "Virgin Land City". However, the year of 1960 ended up being one of the worst years for agriculture during the program.

=== 1961–1963 ===
Productivity of the Virgin Lands underwent a steady decrease following the harvest of 1958. In 1963 Khrushchev began an initiative to widely expand fertilizer production and availability throughout the Soviet Union in order to increase the productivity of the Virgin Lands. The USSR only possessed 20 million tons of fertilizers for 218 million hectares (2,180,000 km^{2}) as opposed to the United States, which possessed 35 million tons of fertilizer for 118 million hectares (1,180,000 km^{2}) of land. Khrushchev ordered 60 new fertilizer factories to be built. Even so, the productivity of the Virgin Lands continued to decline and never got close to replicating the record harvest of 1956.

== Major challenges ==
=== Poor living conditions and manpower shortages ===
Virgin Land areas were mostly rural settlements with small populations. The incredible speed with which Virgin Land workers were recruited and transported to the Virgin Lands created major housing and food shortages. The poor living conditions caused many workers to quickly pack up and leave within the first months to years of arriving in the Virgin Lands. The number of workers on the state farms in Kazakhstan increased by 322,000 from 1954 to 1957, but in this time only 1,800,000 m^{2} of housing was built. The people who were attracted to the Virgin Land settlements were young men from poor villages, orphans, and released prisoners because even though the living conditions were poor, it was still an improvement in their lifestyles. While the food shortages in Virgin Land settlements were solved by 1956, the housing problem remained an issue past the end of the 1950s.

As a consequence of the poor living conditions and constant out-migration, there were shortages of workers on the new Virgin Land state farms. Between 1957 and 1960, 24,000 specialists of all disciplines were sent to work in the Virgin Land districts of Kazakhstan, and during the same time period 14,000 specialists left due to poor living conditions. Additionally, the workers who did stay were mostly young and inexperienced, lacking the skills to work the machinery and farm efficiently. To deal with the issue, a decree was issued in Kazakhstan at the end of 1959 that ordered the full-time training of 65,000 new tractorists and an additional 50,000 in off-duty time. However, due to resource restraints, less than half that number received training. As a short-term solution, the government began paying about 250,000 experienced farmers per year from southern regions of Kazakhstan to come to work in the Virgin Lands after they completed their own harvests.

=== Machinery and repair shop shortages ===
Despite Khrushchev's efforts to adequately supply the Virgin Land provinces with farm machinery by sending nearly all newly manufactured equipment and commandeering machinery from other areas of the Soviet Union for Virgin Land areas, there were still major shortages of farming machinery. For example, in Kazakhstan in 1959, there was only 1 tractor for every 218 (2.18 km^{2}) hectares of land. The problem was simply that the agricultural machinery industry in the Soviet Union was not capable of producing the amount of machinery demanded by sudden expansion of land under cultivation. Furthermore, machinery parts and the facilities and professionals needed for tractor repair were also in short supply, resulting in machinery going unused even when all that was needed was a simple, cheap repair.

=== Climate ===
The dryland conditions in the Virgin Land areas, especially Kazakhstan, were not conducive to monoculture farming. The area got only 200 to 350 mm of rain yearly and the majority tended to fall in July and August, when the grain was ripening and at harvest time, whereas drought usually occurred in spring when the immature shoots needed the most water. Furthermore, the vegetation period was short and the area was prone to cold spells and frosts as late as early fall. Strong winds blew snow from the fields in winter and caused soil erosion in the spring. The soil was also characterized by high salt content. The intensive monoculture farming of the Virgin Lands campaign, with 83% of the total cropland in 1958–1959 being covered by grain, depleted the soil of necessary nutrients. This is likely one of the major causes for the gradual decrease in Virgin Land productivity after 1959.

=== Inadequate grain storage facilities ===
Very little infrastructure existed in the Virgin Land provinces prior to Khrushchev's announcement of the campaign. Consequently, when harvesting began there were minimal storage facilities for the crops. This caused substantial amounts of the crop yield to be left in the fields to rot. Furthermore, lack of storage facilities caused farmers to hastily harvest the entire crop during suitable weather, leading to ripe and unripe grain often being mixed together. This raised the moisture content and caused the grain to spoil. The loss of spoiled grain in this manner (referred to as dockage) often accounted for the loss of 10–15% of crop output. Harvests in Kazakhstan in 1956, 1958, and 1959 respectively were 23.8, 21.9, and 19.9 million tons of grain, whereas the storage capacity of Kazakhstan in 1960 was only 10 million tons of grain.

== Commemoration ==
- A minor planet, 2111 Tselina, discovered on 13 June 1969 by Soviet astronomer Tamara Smirnova was named to commemorate the 25th anniversary of virgin soil development in the USSR, in 1979.
- In movies: The First Echelon (1955), Ivan Brovkin on the State Farm (1959)
- Virgin Lands was the third part of Brezhnev's trilogy, a series of memoirs of Soviet leader Leonid Brezhnev (although most likely written by government-attached journalists).

== See also ==
- Great Leap Forward, contemporary program in the People's Republic of China
- Heat, a 1963 film
- Mubarek zone
- Tanganyika groundnut scheme, a failed 1950s agricultural program in the British Empire
- Twenty-five-thousander
