= Tselina =

Soviet term for undeveloped fertile lands

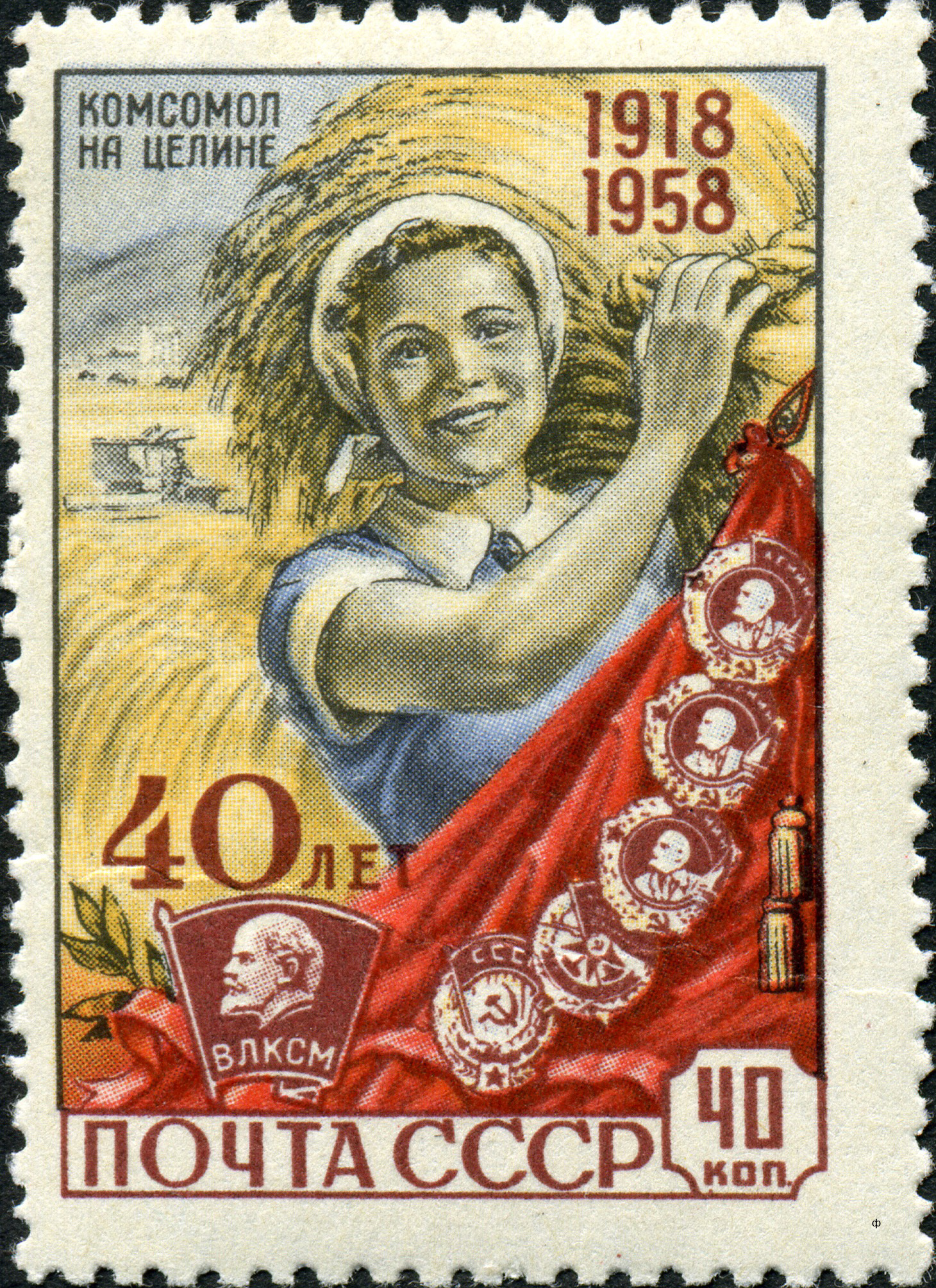
"Komsomol to the Virgin Lands", 1958 stamp

Tselina or virgin lands (Russian: целина́, lit. 'whole lands'; Ukrainian: цілина́, romanized: tsilina) is an umbrella term for underdeveloped, scarcely populated, high-fertility lands often covered with the chernozem soil. The lands were mostly located in the steppes of the Volga region, Northern Kazakhstan and Southern Siberia.

The term became widely used in the late 1950s and early 1960s in the Soviet Union during the Virgin Lands campaign (Russian: Освое́ние целины́, romanized: Osvoyeniye tseliny, lit. 'reclamation of tselina') - a state development and resettlement campaign to turn the lands into a major agriculture producing region.

== See also ==
- Tselinograd
