= List of township-level divisions of Heilongjiang =

Location of Heilongjiang province in China

This is a list of township-level divisions of the province of Heilongjiang, People's Republic of China (PRC). After province, prefecture, and county-level divisions, township-level divisions constitute the formal fourth-level administrative divisions of the PRC. There are a total of 1,369 such divisions in Heilongjiang, divided into 393 subdistricts, 443 towns, 8 ethnic towns, 477 townships, and 48 ethnic townships. This list is divided first into the prefecture-level divisions then the county-level divisions.

== Harbin ==
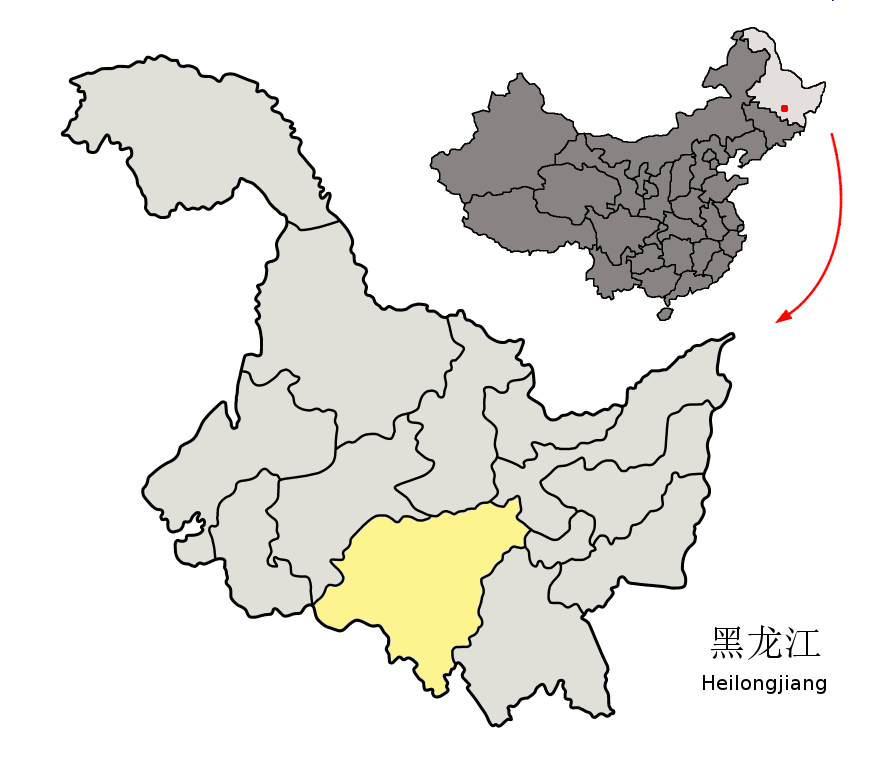
Location of Harbin in the province

=== Acheng District ===
Subdistricts:

- Tongcheng Subdistrict (通城街道), Jindu Subdistrict (金都街道), Jincheng Subdistrict (金城街道), Hedong Subdistrict (河东街道), Ashihe Subdistrict (阿什河街道), Sheli Subdistrict (舍利街道), Xinli Subdistrict (新利街道), Shuangfeng Subdistrict (双丰街道), Yuquan Subdistrict (玉泉街道)

Towns:

- Feiketu (蜚克图镇), Jiaojie (交界镇), Xiaoling (小岭镇), Pingshan (平山镇), Yagou (亚沟镇), Songfengshan (松峰山镇), Hongxing (红星镇), Jinlongshan (金龙山镇)

Townships:

- Yangshu Township (杨树乡), Liaodian Manchu Ethnic Township (料甸满族乡)

=== Daoli District ===
Subdistricts:

- Anjing Subdistrict (安静街道), Fushun Subdistrict (抚顺街道), Xinhua Subdistrict (新华街道), Kang'an Subdistrict (康安街道), Shangzhi Subdistrict (尚志街道), Zhengyanghe Subdistrict (正阳河街道), Jianguo Subdistrict (建国街道), Anhe Subdistrict (安和街道), Gongle Subdistrict (共乐街道), Stalin Subdistrict (斯大林街道), Gongcheng Subdistrict (工程街道), Jingwei Subdistrict (经纬街道), Zhaolin Subdistrict (兆麟街道), Xinyang Road Subdistrict (新阳路街道), Gongnong Subdistrict (工农街道), Tongjiang Subdistrict (通江街道), Chengxiang Road Subdistrict (城乡路街道), Aijian Subdistrict (爱建街道)

Towns:

- Xinfa (新发镇), Taiping (太平镇), Xinnong (新农镇), Yushu (榆树镇)

The only township is Qunli Township (群力乡)

=== Daowai District ===
Subdistricts:

- Jingyu Subdistrict (靖宇街道), Taigu Subdistrict (太古街道), Donglai Subdistrict (东莱街道), Binjiang Subdistrict (滨江街道), Renli Subdistrict (仁里街道), Nanshi Subdistrict (南市街道), Chongjian Subdistrict (崇俭街道), Zhenjiang Subdistrict (振江街道), Dongyuan Subdistrict (东原街道), Daxing Subdistrict (大兴街道), Shengli Subdistrict (胜利街道), Nanma Subdistrict (南马街道), Minqiang Subdistrict (民强街道), Dayoufang Subdistrict (大有坊街道), Nanzhi Road Subdistrict (南直路街道), Huagong Subdistrict (化工街道), Huochetou Subdistrict (火车头街道), Xinyi Subdistrict (新一街道), Sankeshu Avenue Subdistrict (三棵树大街街道), Shuini Road Subdistrict (水泥路街道), Taiping Avenue Subdistrict (太平大街街道), Lihua Subdistrict (黎华街道), Xinle Subdistrict (新乐街道)

Towns:

- Yongyuan (永源镇), Juyuan (巨源镇), Tuanjie (团结镇)

The only township is Minzhu Township (民主乡)

=== Hulan District ===
Subdistricts:

- Yaobao Subdistrict (腰堡街道), Hulan Subdistrict (呼兰街道), Limin Subdistrict (利民街道), Lanhe Subdistrict (兰河街道), Kangjin Subdistrict (康金街道), Shuangjing Subdistrict (双井街道)

Towns:

- Fangtai (方台镇), Shenjia (沈家镇), Erba (二八镇), Shiren (石人镇), Baikui (白奎镇), Lianhua (莲花镇), Dayong (大用镇), Changling (长岭镇)

Townships:

- Yanglin Township (杨林乡), Xubao Township (许堡乡), Mengjia Township (孟家乡)

=== Nangang District ===
Subdistricts:

- Liaoyuan Subdistrict (燎原街道), Dacheng Subdistrict (大成街道), Songhua River Subdistrict (松花江街道), Huayuan Subdistrict (花园街道), Quxian Subdistrict (曲线街道), Tongda Subdistrict (通达街道), Qizheng Subdistrict (七政街道), Hexing Subdistrict (和兴街道), Haxi Subdistrict (哈西街道), Baojian Subdistrict (保健街道), Rongshi Subdistrict (荣市街道), Fendou Subdistrict (奋斗街道), Hujia Subdistrict (芦家街道), Gexin Subdistrict (革新街道), Wenhua Subdistrict (文化街道), Xianfeng Subdistrict (先锋街道), Xinchun Subdistrict (新春街道), Yuejin Subdistrict (跃进街道)

The only town is Wanggang (王岗镇), and the only township is Hongqi Manchu Ethnic Township (红旗满族乡)

=== Pingfang District ===
Subdistricts:

- Youxie Subdistrict (友协街道), Baoguo Subdistrict (保国街道), Lianmeng Subdistrict (联盟街道), Xinwei Subdistrict (新伟街道), Xinjiang Subdistrict (新疆街道), Xingjian Subdistrict (兴建街道)

Towns:

- Pingfang (平房镇), Pingxin (平新镇)

=== Songbei District ===
Subdistricts:

- Songbei Subdistrict (松北街道), Songpu Subdistrict (松浦街道), Wanbao Subdistrict (万宝街道), Taiyangdao Subdistrict (太阳岛街道), Sandian Subdistrict (三电街道), Song'an Subdistrict (松安街道), Songxiang Subdistrict (松祥街道), Chuankou Subdistrict (船口街道)

Towns:

- Leye (乐业镇), Duiqingshan (对青山镇)

=== Xiangfang District ===
Subdistricts:

- Xiangfang Avenue Subdistrict (香坊大街街道), Liushun Subdistrict (六顺街道), Hongqi Avenue Subdistrict (红旗大街街道), Anbeng Subdistrict (安埠街道), Tongtian Subdistrict (通天街道), Xincheng Subdistrict (新成街道), Tiedong Subdistrict (铁东街道), New Xiangfang Subdistrict (新香坊街道), Wangzhao Subdistrict (王兆街道), Anle Subdistrict (安乐街道), Heping Road Subdistrict (和平路街道), Hexing Road Subdistrict (和兴路街道), Daqing Road Subdistrict (大庆路街道), Minsheng Road Subdistrict (民生路街道), Jiankang Road Subdistrict (健康路街道), Liming Subdistrict (黎明街道), Jinxiang Subdistrict (进乡街道), Tongxiang Subdistrict (通乡街道), Haping Road Subdistrict (哈平路街道), Jianzhu Subdistrict (建筑街道), Wenzheng Subdistrict (文政街道)

Towns:

- Chenggaozi (成高子镇), Chaoyang (朝阳镇), Xingfu (幸福镇)

The only township is Xiangyang Township (向阳乡)

=== Shangzhi ===
Towns:

- Shangzhi Town (尚志镇), Yabuli (亚布力镇), Weihe (苇河镇), Yimianpo (一面坡镇), Mao'ershan (帽儿山镇), Qingyang (庆阳镇), Lianghe (亮河镇), Shitouhezi (石头河子镇), Yuanbao (元宝镇), Heilonggong (黑龙宫镇)

Townships:

- Zhenzhushan Township (珍珠山乡), Laojieji Township (老街基乡), Mayan Township (马延乡), Changshou Township (长寿乡), Wujimi Township (乌吉密乡), Hedong Township (河东乡), Yuchi Korean Ethnic Township (鱼池朝鲜族乡)

=== Shuangcheng ===
Towns:

- Shuangcheng (双城镇), Lanleng (兰棱镇), Zhoujia (周家镇), Wujia (五家镇), Handian (韩甸镇), Dancheng (单城镇), Dongguan (东官镇), Xingshan (杏山镇), Nongfeng Manchu and Xibe Ethnic Town (农丰满族锡伯族镇)

Townships:

- Chaoyang Township (朝阳乡), Jincheng Township (金成乡), Yongsheng Township (永胜乡), Linjiang Township (临江乡), Shuiquan Township (水泉乡), Wanlong Township (万隆乡), Qingling Manchu Ethnic Township (青岭满族乡), Lianxing Ethnic Township (联兴满族乡), Xingfu Manchu Ethnic Township (幸福满族乡), Xinxing Manchu Ethnic Township (新兴满族乡), Gongzheng Manchu Ethnic Township (公正满族乡), Lequn Manchu Ethnic Township (乐群满族乡), Xile Manchu Ethnic Township (希勤满族乡), Tongxin Manchu Ethnic Township (同心满族乡), Tuanjie Manchu Ethnic Township (团结满族乡)

=== Wuchang ===
Towns:

- Wuchang (五常镇), Shanhe (山河镇), Xiaoshanzi (小山子镇), Dujia (杜家镇), Xiangyang (向阳镇), Chonghe (冲河镇), Beiyinhe (背荫河镇), Anjia (安家镇), Shahezi (沙河子镇), Niujia Manchu Ethnic Town (牛家满族镇), Lalin Manchu Ethnic Town (拉林满族镇)

Townships:

- Xingsheng Township (兴盛乡), Zhiguang Township (志广乡), Weiguo Township (卫国乡), Changbao Township (常堡乡), Minyi Township (民意乡), Longfengshan Township (龙凤山乡), Bajiazi Township (八家子乡), Changshan Township (长山乡), Xinglong Township (兴隆乡), Erhe Township (二河乡), Hongqi Manchu Ethnic Township (红旗满族乡), Yingchengzi Manchu Ethnic Township (营城子满族乡), Minle Korean Ethnic Ethnic Township (民乐朝鲜族乡)

=== Bayan County ===
Towns:

- Bayan Town (巴彦镇), Xinglong (兴隆镇), Xiji (西集镇), Waxing (洼兴镇), Longquan (龙泉镇), Bayangang (巴彦港镇), Longmiao (龙庙镇), Wanfa (万发镇), Tianzeng (天增镇), Heishan (黑山镇)

Townships:

- Songhuajiang Township (松花江乡), Fujiang Township (富江乡), Huashan Township (华山乡), Fengle Township (丰乐乡), Dexiang Township (德祥乡), Hongguang Township (红光乡), Shanhou Township (山后乡), Zhendong Township (镇东乡)

=== Bin County ===
Towns:

- Binzhou (宾州镇), Juren (居仁镇), Binxi (宾西镇), Tangfang (糖坊镇), Bin'an (宾安镇), Xindian (新甸镇), Shengli (胜利镇), Ningyuan (宁远镇), Baidu (摆渡镇), Pingfang (平坊镇), Manjing (满井镇), Chang'an (常安镇)

Townships:

- Yonghe Township (永和乡), Niaohe Township (鸟河乡), Minhe Township (民和乡), Jingjian Township (经建乡), Sanbao Township (三宝乡)

=== Fangzheng County ===
Towns:

- Fangzheng (方正镇), Daluomi (大罗密镇), Huifa (会发镇)

Townships:

- Baoxing Township (宝兴乡), Deshan Township (德善乡), Tianmen Township (天门乡), Yihantong Township (伊汉通乡), Songnan Township (松南乡)

=== Mulan County ===
Towns:

- Mulan (木兰镇), Dongxing (东兴镇), Dagui (大贵镇), Lidong (利东镇), Liuhe (柳河镇), Xinmin (新民镇)

Townships:

- Jianguo Township (建国乡), Jixing Township (吉兴乡)

=== Tonghe County ===
Towns:

- Tonghe (通河镇), Wuyapao (乌鸦泡镇), Qinghe (清河镇), Nonghe (浓河镇), Fengshan (凤山镇), Xiangshun (祥顺镇)

Townships:

- Sanzhan Township (三站乡), Fulin Township (富林乡)

=== Yanshou County ===
Towns:

- Yanshou (延寿镇), Jiaxin (加信镇), Zhonghe (中和镇), Liutuan (六团镇), Yanhe (延河镇)

Townships:

- Yuhe Township (玉河乡), Shoushan Township (寿山乡), Anshan Township (安山乡), Qingchuan Township (青川乡)

=== Yilan County ===
Towns:

- Yilan (依兰镇), Dalianhe (达连河镇), Daotaiqiao (道台桥镇), Hongkeli (宏克力镇), Sandaogang (三道岗镇), Jiangwan (江湾镇)

Townships:

- Yinglan Korean Ethnic Township (迎兰朝鲜族乡)

== Daqing ==
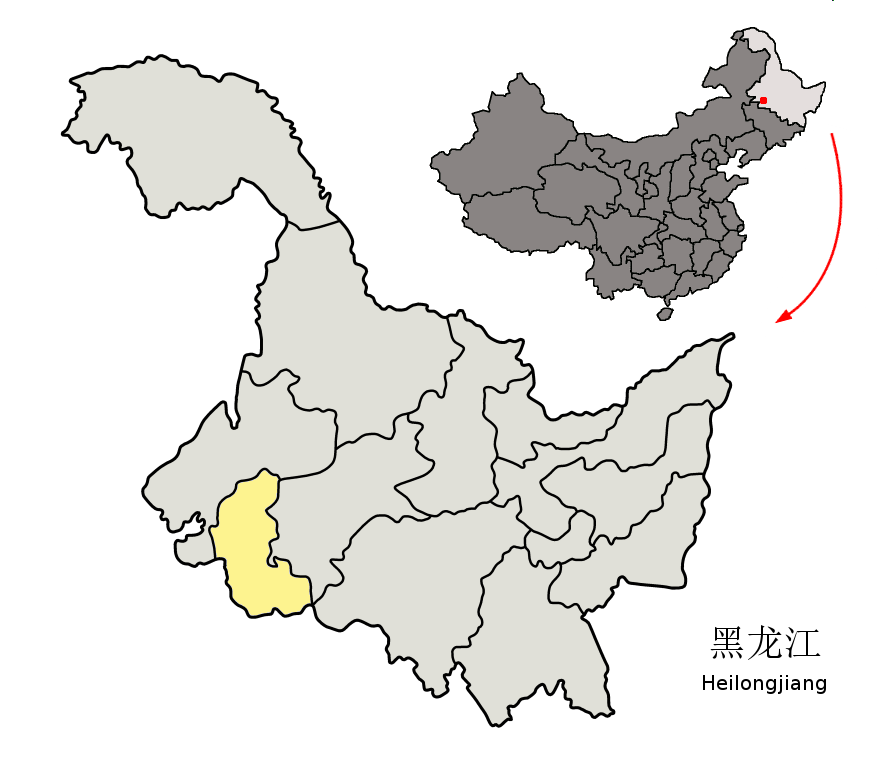
Location of Daqing in the province

=== Datong District ===
Subdistricts:

- Qingpu Subdistrict (庆葡街道), Linyuanzhen Subdistrict (林源镇街道), Lizhi Subdistrict (立志街道), Xinhua Subdistrict (新华街道), Datongzhen Subdistrict (大同镇街道), Gaotaizizhen Subdistrict (高台子镇街道)

Towns:

- Datong (大同镇), Gaotaizi (高台子镇), Taiyangsheng (太阳升镇), Linyuan (林源镇)

Townships:

- Bajingzi Township (八井子乡), Zhusan Township (祝三乡), Laoshantou Township (老山头乡), Shuangyushu Township (双榆树乡)

=== Honggang District ===
Subdistricts:

- Honggang Subdistrict (红岗街道), Jiefang Subdistrict (解放街道), Babaishang Subdistrict (八百垧街道), Chuangye Subdistrict (创业街道), Xingnan Subdistrict (杏南街道)

The only township is Xingshugang Township (杏树岗乡)

=== Longfeng District ===
Subdistricts:

- Longfeng Subdistrict (龙凤街道), Ziqiang Subdistrict (自强街道), Dongguang Subdistrict (东光街道), Xinghua Subdistrict (兴化街道), Wolitun Subdistrict (卧里屯街道)

The only township is Longfeng Township (龙凤乡)

=== Ranghulu District ===
Subdistricts:

- Xibin Subdistrict (西宾街道), Fendou Subdistrict (奋斗街道), Xiufeng Subdistrict (乘风街道), Longgang Subdistrict (龙岗街道), Qingxin Subdistrict (庆新街道), Yinlang Subdistrict (银浪街道)

The only town is Lamadian (喇嘛甸镇)

=== Sartu District ===
Subdistricts:

- Sartu Subdistrict (萨尔图街道), Huizhan Subdistrict (会战街道), Tieren Subdistrict (铁人街道), Youyi Subdistrict (友谊街道), Yongjun Subdistrict (拥军街道), Huoju Subdistrict (火炬街道), Fuqiang Subdistrict (富强街道), Dong'an Subdistrict (东安街道), Dongfeng Subdistrict (东风街道)

=== Dorbod Mongol Autonomous County ===
Towns:

- Taikang (泰康镇), Yantongtun (烟筒屯镇), Hujitumo (胡吉吐莫镇), Talaha (他拉哈镇)

Townships:

- Jiangwan Township (江弯乡), Yixin Township (一心乡), Ke'ertai Township (克尔台乡), Bayinnuolin Township (白音诺勒乡), Yaoxin Township (腰新乡), Bayanchagan Township (巴彦查干乡), Aolinxibai Township (敖林西伯乡)

=== Lindian County ===
Towns:

- Lindian (林甸镇), Hongqi (红旗镇), Heminghu (鹤鸣湖镇)

Townships:

- Dongxing Township (东兴乡), Hongwei Township (宏伟乡), Huayuan Township (花园乡), Sihe Township (四合乡), Liming Township (黎明乡)

=== Zhaoyuan County ===
Towns:

- Zhaoyuan (肇源镇), Xinzhan (新站镇), Maoxing (茂兴镇), Erzhan (二站镇), Sanzhan (三站镇), Toutai (头台镇), Gulong (古龙镇)

Townships:

- Minyi Township (民意乡), Guqia Township (古恰乡), Daxing Township (大兴乡), Fuxing Township (福兴乡), Heping Township (和平乡), Bohetai Township (薄荷台乡), Haode Mongol Ethnic Township (浩德蒙古族乡), Yishun Mongol Ethnic Township (义顺蒙古族乡), Chaodeng Mongol Ethnic Township (超等蒙古族乡)

=== Zhaozhou County ===
Towns:

- Zhaozhou (肇州镇), Xingcheng (兴城镇), Chaoyanggou (朝阳沟镇), Fengle (丰乐镇), Yongle (永乐镇), Erjingzi (二井子镇)

Townships:

- Tuogu Township (托古乡), Chaoyang Township (朝阳乡), Xinfu Township (新福乡), Shuanglong Township (双发乡), Yongsheng Township (永胜乡), Yushu Township (榆树乡)

Miscellanea:

- Leyuan Pedigree Ranch (乐园良种场), Weixing Breeding Ranch (卫星种畜场)

== Da Hinggan Ling Prefecture ==
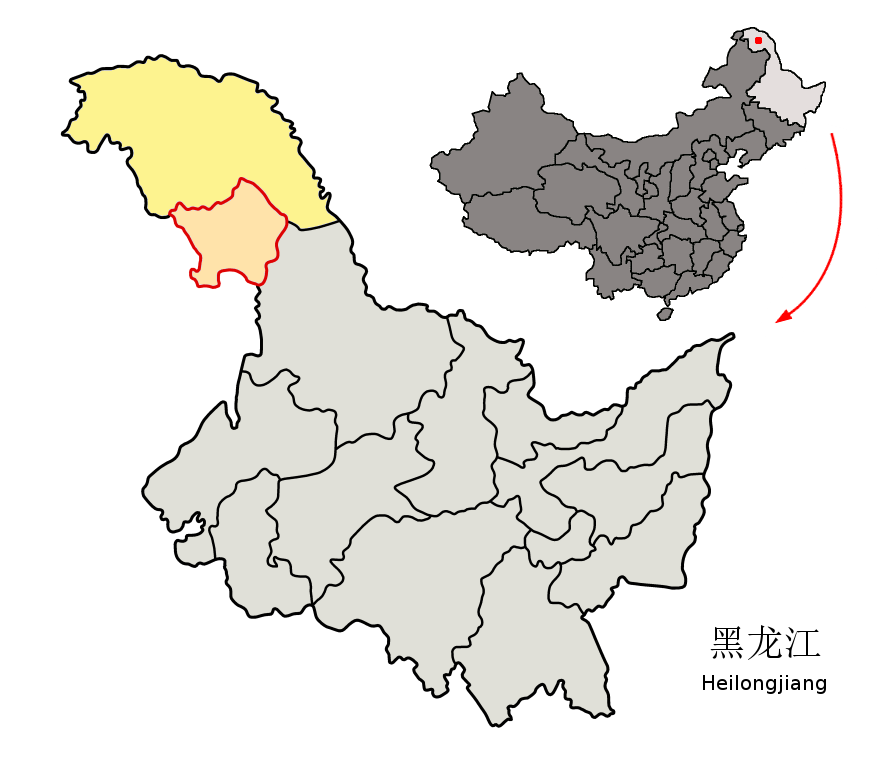
Location of Da Hinggan Ling Prefecture in the province

=== Huzhong District ===
Towns:

- Huzhong Town (呼中镇), Bishui (碧水镇), Huyuan (呼源镇), Hongwei (宏伟镇)

=== Jiagedaqi District ===
Subdistricts:

- Dongshan Subdistrict (东山街道), Weidong Subdistrict (卫东街道), Hongqi Subdistrict (红旗街道), Changhong Subdistrict (长虹街道), Shuguang Subdistrict (曙光街道), Guangming Subdistrict (光明街道)

Townships:

- Jiabei Township (加北乡), Baihua Township (白桦乡)

=== Songling District ===
Towns:

- Xiaoyangqi (小扬气镇), Jingsong (劲松镇), Guyuan (古源镇)

=== Xinlin District ===
Towns:

- Xinlin Town (新林镇), Cuigang (翠岗镇), Tayuan (塔源镇), Dawusu (大乌苏镇), Ta'ergen (塔尔根镇), Bizhou (碧洲镇), Hongtu (宏图镇)

=== Huma County ===
Towns:

- Huma (呼玛镇), Hanjiayuan (韩家园镇)

Townships:

- Sanka Township (三卡乡), Jinshan Township (金山乡), Xinghua Township (兴华乡), Oupu Township (鸥浦乡), Beijiang Township (北疆乡), Baiyinna Oroqen Ethnic Township (白银纳鄂伦春族乡)

=== Mohe County ===
Towns:

- Silinji (西林吉镇), Tuqiang (图强镇), Jingshou (劲涛镇), Xing'an (兴安镇)

The only township is Beiji Township (北极乡)

=== Tahe County ===
Towns:

- Tahe (塔河镇), Walagan (瓦拉干镇), Pangu (盘古镇)

Townships:

- Yixiken Township (依西肯乡), Kaikukang Township (开库康乡), Shibazhan Oroqen Ethnic Township (十八站鄂伦春族乡)

== Hegang ==
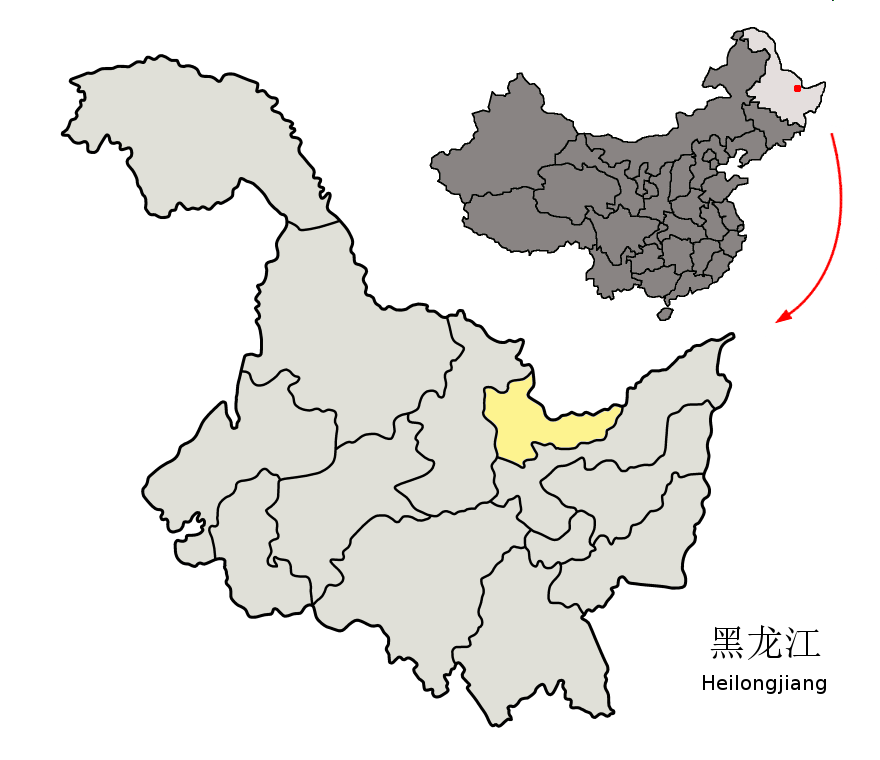
Location of Hegang in the province

=== Dongshan District ===
Subdistricts:

- Xinyi Subdistrict (新一街道), Sanjie Subdistrict (三街街道), Gongrencun Subdistrict (工人村街道), Dongshan Subdistrict (东山街道)

The only town is Xinhua (新华镇)

Townships:

- Tuanjie Township (团结乡), Dongfanghong Township (东方红乡), Hongqi Township (红旗乡), Shuyuan Township (蔬园乡)

=== Gongnong District ===
Subdistricts:

- Hubin Subdistrict (湖滨街道), Tuanjie Subdistrict (团结街道), Jiefang Subdistrict (解放街道), Yucai Subdistrict (育才街道), Xinnan Subdistrict (新南街道), Hongqi Subdistrict (红旗街道)

=== Nanshan District ===
Subdistricts:

- Dalu Subdistrict (大陆街道), Tiedong Subdistrict (铁东街道), Tiexi Subdistrict (铁西街道), Liuhao Subdistrict (六号街道), Fuli Subdistrict (富力街道), Lulinshan Subdistrict (鹿林山街道)

=== Xiangyang District, Hegang ===
Subdistricts:

- Beishan Subdistrict (北山街道), Hongjun Subdistrict (红军街道), Guangming Subdistrict (光明街道), Shengli Subdistrict (胜利街道), Nanyi Subdistrict (南翼街道)

=== Xing'an District ===
Subdistricts:

- Junde Road Subdistrict (竣德路街道), Hedong Road Subdistrict (河东路街道), Xingchang Road Subdistrict (兴长路街道), Xing'an Road Subdistrict (兴安路街道), Xingjian Road Subdistrict (兴建路街道)

=== Xingshan District ===
Subdistricts:

- Gounan Subdistrict (沟南街道), Goubei Subdistrict (沟北街道), Lingnan Subdistrict (岭南街道), Lingbei Subdistrict (岭北街道)

=== Luobei County ===
Towns:

- Fengxiang (凤翔镇), Hebei (鹤北镇), Mingshan (名山镇), Zhaoxing (肇兴镇), Tuanjie (团结镇)

Townships:

- Taipinggou Township (太平沟乡), Huanshan Township (环山乡), Fendou Township (奋斗乡), Lianhua Township (莲花乡), Weichang Township (苇场乡), Dongming Korean Ethnic Township (东明朝鲜族乡)

=== Suibin County ===
Towns:

- Suibin (绥滨镇), Zhongren (忠仁镇), Suidong (绥东镇)

Townships:

- Fuqiang Township (富强乡), Beishan Township (北山乡), Xinfu Township (新富乡), Beigang Township (北岗乡), Liansheng Township (连生乡), Fuxing Township (福兴乡)

== Heihe ==
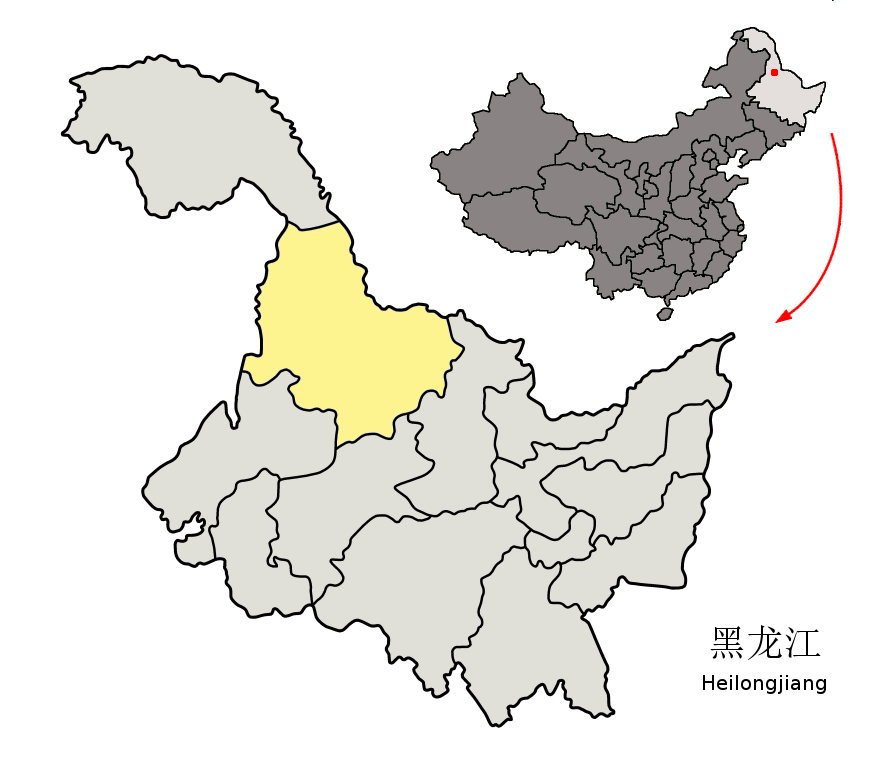
Location of Heihe in the province

=== Aihui District ===
Subdistricts:

- Huayuan Subdistrict (花园街道), Xing'an Subdistrict (兴安街道), Xixing Subdistrict (西兴街道), Hailan Subdistrict (海兰街道)

Towns:

- Xigangzi (西岗子镇), Aihui Town (爱辉镇), Handaqi (罕达汽镇)

Townships:

- Xingfu Township (幸福乡), Sijiazi Manchu Ethnic Township (四嘉子满族乡), Kunhe Daur and Manchu Ethnic Township (坤河达斡尔族满族乡), Shangmachang Township (上马厂乡), Zhangdiyingzi Township (张地营子乡), Xifengshan Township (西峰山乡), Xinsheng Oroqen Ethnic Township (新生鄂伦春族乡), Erzhan Township (二站乡)

=== Bei'an ===
Subdistricts:

- Heping Subdistrict (和平街道), Zhaolin Subdistrict (兆麟街道), Qinghua Subdistrict (庆华街道), Tiexi Subdistrict (铁西街道), Tienan Subdistrict (铁南街道), Beigang Subdistrict (北岗街道)

Towns:

- Tongbei (通北镇), Zhaoguang (赵光镇), Shiquan (石泉镇), Haixing (海星镇), Erjing (二井镇)

Townships:

- Chengjiao Township (城郊乡), Dongsheng Township (东胜乡), Zhuxing Township (主星乡), Yangjia Township (杨家乡)

=== Wudalianchi ===
Subdistricts:

- Qingshan Subdistrict (青山街道)

Towns:

- Long (龙镇), Heping (和平镇), Shuangquan (双泉镇), Wudalianchi Town (五大连池镇)

Townships:

- Xinfa Township (新发乡), Xinglong Township (兴隆乡), Xing'an Township (兴安乡), Chaoyang Township (朝阳乡), Tuanjie Township (团结乡), Jianshe Township (建设乡), Taiping Township (太平乡)

=== Nenjiang County ===
Towns:

- Nenjiang (嫩江镇), Shuangshan (双山镇), Yilaha (伊拉哈镇), Haijiang (海江镇), Duobaoshan (多宝山镇), Qianjin (前进镇), Changfu (长福镇)

Townships:

- Baiyun Township (白云乡), Keluo Township (科洛乡), Maihai Township (麦海乡), Taxi Township (塔溪乡), Huolongmen Township (霍龙门乡), Lianxing Township (联兴乡), Linjiang Township (临江乡), Changjiang Township (长江乡)

=== Sunwu County ===
The only subdistrict is Sunwuchengqu Subdistrict (孙吴城区街道)

Towns:

- Sunwu (孙吴镇), Chenqing (辰清镇), Siji (四季镇)

Townships:

- Xixing Township (西兴乡), Yanjiang Manchu Township (沿江满族乡), Yaotun Township (腰屯乡), Woniuhe Township (卧牛河乡), Qunshan Township (群山乡), Fendou Township (奋斗乡), Hongqi Township (红旗乡), Zhengyangshan Township (正阳山乡), Qingxi Township (清溪乡)

=== Xunke County ===
Towns:

- Qike (奇克镇), Xunhe (逊河镇)

Townships:

- Ayanhe Township (阿廷河乡), Kelin Township (克林乡), Baoshan Township (宝山乡), Songshugou Township (松树沟乡), Chelu Township (车陆乡), Bianjiang Township (边疆乡), Ganchazi Township (干岔子乡), Dapingtai Township (大平台乡), Xinxing Oroqen Ethnic Township (新兴鄂伦春族乡), Xin'e Oroqen Ethnic Township (新鄂鄂伦春族乡)

== Jiamusi ==
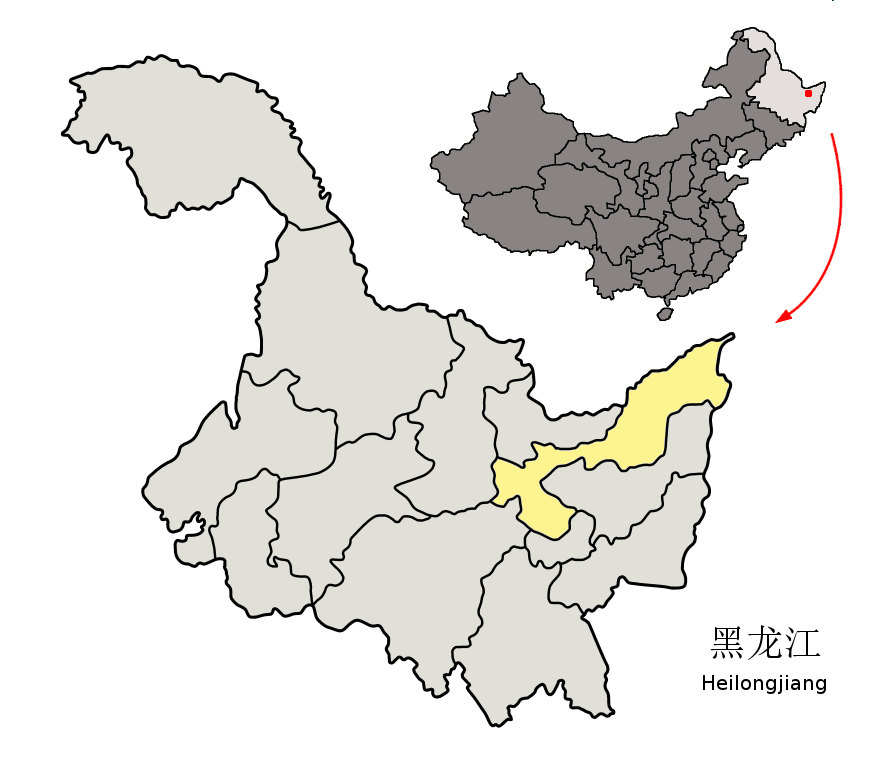
Location of Jiamusi in the province

=== Dongfeng District ===
Subdistricts:

- Jianguo Subdistrict (建国街道), Xiaoyun Subdistrict (晓云街道), Jiadong Subdistrict (佳东街道), Jianan Subdistrict (佳南街道), Zaozhi Subdistrict (造纸街道)

Townships:

- Songjiang Township (松江乡), Jianguo Township (建国乡)

=== Jiaoqu ===
Subdistricts:

- Jiaxi Subdistrict (佳西街道), Youyi Road Subdistrict (友谊路街道)

Towns:

- Lianjiangkou (莲江口镇), Changfa (长发镇), Wangjiang (望江镇), Aoqi (敖其镇), Dalai (大来镇)

Townships:

- Ping'an Township (平安乡), Gaofeng Township (高峰乡), Qunsheng Township (群胜乡), Xigemu Township (西格木乡), Yanjiang Township (沿江乡), Sifeng Township (四丰乡), Changqing Township (长青乡)

=== Qianjin District ===
Subdistricts:

- Fendou Subdistrict (奋斗街道), Yong'an Subdistrict (永安街道), Zhanqian Subdistrict (站前街道), Nangang Subdistrict (南岗街道), Liangzihe Subdistrict (亮子河街道), Tianyuan Subdistrict (田园街道)

=== Xiangyang District, Jiamusi ===
Subdistricts:

- Baowei Subdistrict (保卫街道), West Nangang Subdistrict (西南岗街道), Qiaonan Subdistrict (桥南街道), Xilin Subdistrict (西林街道), Jianshe Subdistrict (建设街道), Chang'an Subdistrict (长安街道)

=== Fujin City ===
Subdistricts:

- Chengdong Subdistrict (城东街道), Chengxi Subdistrict (城西街道)

Towns:

- Fujin Town (富锦镇), Erlongshan (二龙山镇), Xiangyangchuan (向阳川镇), Jinshan (锦山镇), Toulin (头林镇), Xinglonggang (兴隆岗镇), Hongsheng (宏胜镇), Shangjieji (上街基镇), Yanshan (砚山镇), Chang'an (长安镇), Dayushu (大榆树镇)

=== Tongjiang ===
Towns:

- Tongjiang (同江镇), Leye (乐业镇), Sancun (三村镇), Linjiang (临江镇)

Townships:

- Xiangyang Township (向阳乡), Qinghe Township (清河乡), Jinchuan Township (金川乡), Yinchuan Township (银川乡), Jiejinkou Township (街津口乡), Bacha Township (八岔乡)

=== Fuyuan County ===
Towns:

- Fuyuan (抚远镇), Nongqiao (浓桥镇), Zhuaji (抓吉镇), Hanconggou (寒葱沟镇)

Townships:

- Bielahong Township (别拉洪乡), Haiqing Township (海青乡), Yanan Township (鸭南乡), Nongjiang Township (浓江乡), Tongjiang Township (通江乡)

=== Huachuan County ===
Towns:

- Yuelai (悦来镇), Sujiadian (苏家店镇), Xincheng (新城镇), Hengtoushan (横头山镇)

Townships:

- Donghe Township (东河乡), Lifeng Township (梨丰乡), Chuangye Township (创业乡), Simajia Township (四马架乡), Xinghuo Township (星火乡)

=== Huanan County ===
Towns:

- Huanan (桦南镇), Mengjiagang (孟家岗镇), Yanjia (闫家镇), Tulongshan (土龙山镇), Tuoyaozi (驼腰子镇), Shitouhezi (石头河子镇)

Townships:

- Lishu Township (梨树乡), Jinsha Township (金沙乡), Mingyi Township (明义乡), Dabalang Township (大八浪乡)

=== Tangyuan County ===
Towns:

- Tangyuan (汤原镇), Zhulian (竹帘镇), Xianglan (香兰镇), Heli (鹤立镇), Tangwang (汤旺乡)

Townships:

- Taipingchuan Township (太平川乡), Yongfa Township (永发乡), Jixiang Township (吉祥乡), Shengli Township (胜利乡), Zhenxing Township (振兴乡)

== Jixi ==
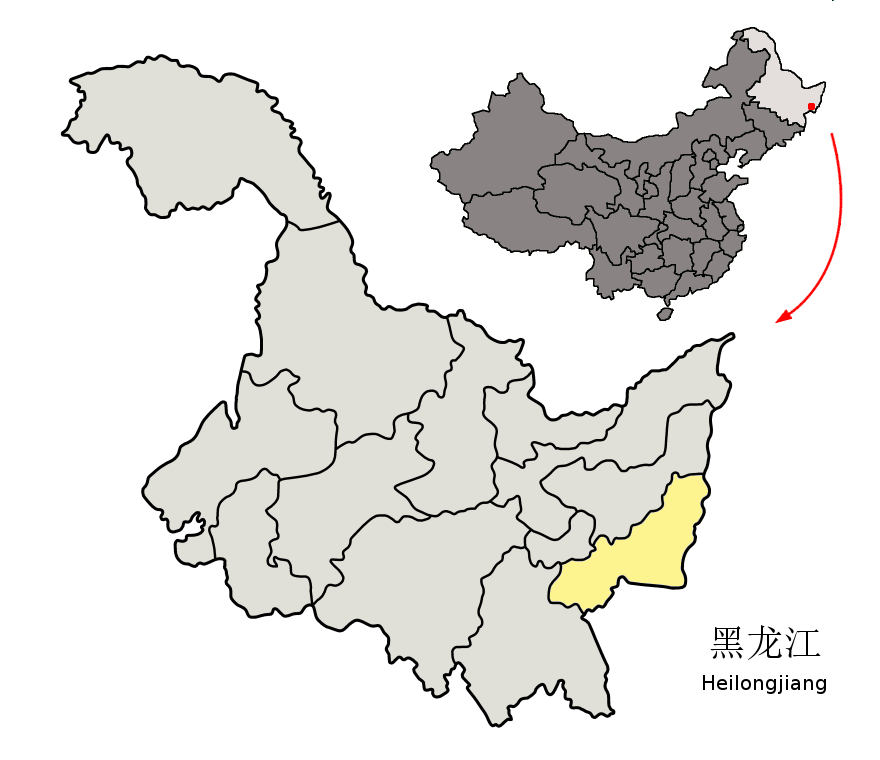
Location of Jixi in the province

=== Chengzihe District ===
Subdistricts:

- Chengzihe Subdistrict (城子河街道), Chengxi Subdistrict (城西街道), Zhengyang Subdistrict (正阳街道), Xinghua Subdistrict (杏花街道), Donghai Subdistrict (东海街道)

Townships:

- Changqing Township (长青乡), Yongfeng Korean Ethnic Township (永丰朝鲜族乡)

=== Didao District ===
Subdistricts:

- Dongxing Subdistrict (东兴街道), Kuangli Subdistrict (矿里街道), Ximei Subdistrict (洗煤街道), Datonggou Subdistrict (大通沟街道)

Townships:

- Didaohe Township (滴道河乡), Lanling Township (兰岭乡)

=== Hengshan District ===
Subdistricts:

- Huamulin Subdistrict (桦木林街道), Greater Hengshan Subdistrict (大恒山街道), Lesser Hengshan Subdistrict (小恒山街道), Erdaohezi Subdistrict (二道河子街道), Zhangxin Subdistrict (张新街道), Fendou Subdistrict (奋斗街道), Liumao Subdistrict (柳毛街道)

Townships:

- Hongqi Township (红旗乡), Minzhu Township (民主乡), Liumao Township (柳毛乡)

=== Jiguan District ===
Subdistricts:

- Xiangyang Subdistrict (向阳街道), Nanshan Subdistrict (南山街道), Lixin Subdistrict (立新街道), Dongfeng Subdistrict (东风街道), Red Army Road Subdistrict (红军路街道), West Jixi Subdistrict (西鸡西街道), Xishan Subdistrict (西山街道)

Townships:

- Hongxing Township (红星乡), Xijiao Township (西郊乡)

=== Lishu District ===
Subdistricts:

- Shilin Subdistrict (石磷街道), Jianchang Subdistrict (碱场街道), Pinggang Subdistrict (平岗街道), Maoling Subdistrict (穆棱街道), Jieli Subdistrict (街里街道)

=== Mashan District ===
The only subdistrict Mashan Subdistrict (麻山街道)

=== Hulin ===
Towns:

- Hulin Town (虎林镇), Dongfanghong (东方红镇), Yingchun (迎春镇), Hutou (虎头镇), Yanggang (杨岗镇), Zhongcheng (忠诚镇), Baodong (宝东镇)

Townships:

- Xiaomuhe Township (小木河乡), Abei Township (阿北乡), Weiguang Township (伟光乡), Xinle Township (新乐乡)

=== Mishan ===
The only subdistrict is Zhongxin Subdistrict (中心街道)

Towns:

- Mishan Town (密山镇), Lianzhushan (连珠山镇), Zhiyi (知一镇), Peide (裴德镇), Heitai (黑台镇), Dangbi (当壁镇), Xingkai (兴凯镇)

Townships:

- Errenban Township (二人班乡), Baipaozi Township (白泡子乡), Xingkaihu Township (兴凯湖乡), Chengzihe Township (承紫河乡), Yangmu Township (杨木乡), Liumao Township (柳毛乡), Fuyuan Township (富源乡), Taiping Township (太平乡), Baiyuwan Township (白鱼湾乡), Heping Township (和平乡)

=== Jidong County ===
Towns:

- Jidong (鸡东镇), Pingyang (平阳镇), Xiangyang (向阳镇), Hada (哈达镇), Yong'an (永安镇), Yonghe (永和镇), Donghai (东海镇), Xingnong (兴农镇)

Townships:

- Jilin Township (鸡林乡), Mingde Korean Ethnic Township (明德朝鲜族乡), Xialiangzi Township (下亮子乡)

== Mudanjiang ==
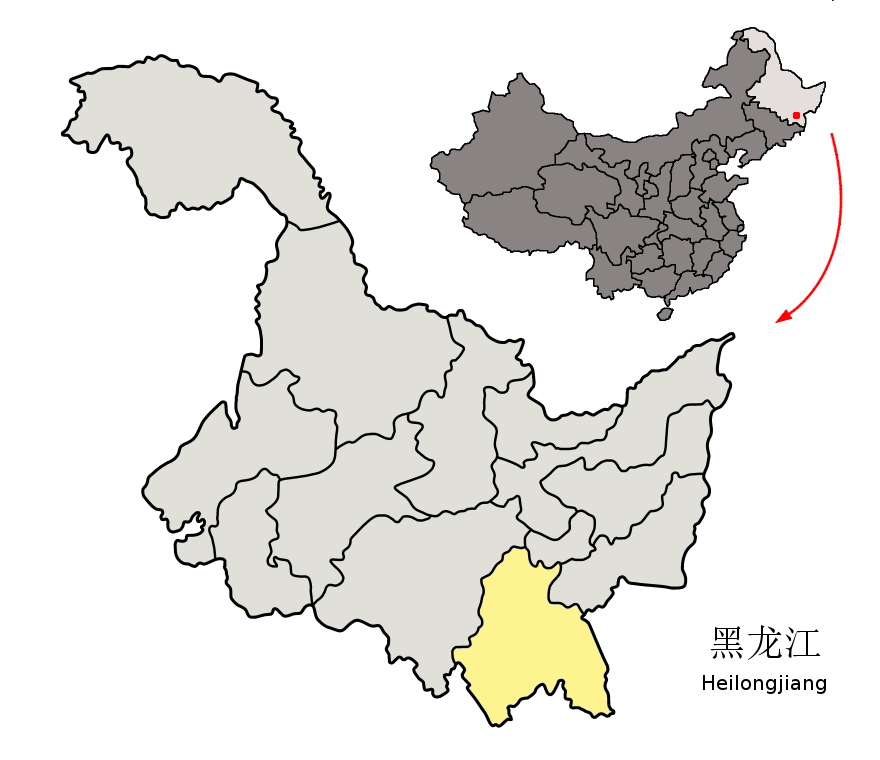
Location of Mudanjiang in the province

=== Aimin District ===
Subdistricts:

- Xiangyang Subdistrict (向阳街道), Huanghua Subdistrict (黄花街道), Tiebei Subdistrict (铁北街道), Xinhua Subdistrict (新华街道), Daqing Subdistrict (大庆街道), Xingping Subdistrict (兴平街道), Beishan Subdistrict (北山街道)

The only township is Bei'an Township (北安乡)

=== Dong'an District ===
Subdistricts:

- Qixing Subdistrict (七星街道), Xin'an Subdistrict (新安街道), Chang'an Subdistrict (长安街道), Wuxing Subdistrict (五星街道), Xinglong Subdistrict (兴隆街道)

=== Xi'an District ===
Subdistricts:

- Xianfeng Subdistrict (先锋街道), Huoju Subdistrict (火炬街道), Lixin Subdistrict (立新街道), Mudan Subdistrict (牡丹街道), Jiangbin Subdistrict (江滨街道), Yanjiang Subdistrict (沿江街道)

The only town is Wenchun (温春镇), and the only township is Hainan Korean Ethnic Township (海南朝鲜族乡)

=== Yangming District ===
Subdistricts:

- Yangming Subdistrict (阳明街道), Qianjin Subdistrict (前进街道), Xinxing Subdistrict (新兴街道), Hualinxiangjiaochang Subdistrict (桦林橡胶厂街道)

Towns:

- Tieling (铁岭镇), Hualin (桦林镇), Modaoshi (磨刀石镇), Wulin (五林镇)

=== Hailin ===
Towns:

- Hailin Town (海林镇), Changting (长汀镇), Chaihe (柴河镇), Hengdaohe (横道河镇), Shanshi (山市镇), Erdaohe (二道河镇), Sandaohezi (三道河子镇), Xin'an Korean Ethnic Town (新安朝鲜族镇)

=== Muling ===
Towns:

- Bamiantong (八面通镇), Muling Town (穆棱镇), Xingyuan (兴源镇), Maqiaohe (马桥河镇), Xiachengzi (下城子镇)

Townships:

- Gonghe Township (共和乡), Fulu Township (福录乡), Hexi Township (河西乡),

Others:

- Bamiantong Forestry Unit (八面通林业局), Muling Forestry Unit (穆棱林业局)

=== Ning'an ===
Towns:

- Ning'an Town (宁安镇), Dongjingcheng (东京城镇), Bohai (渤海镇), Hailang (海浪镇), Shalan (沙兰镇), Langang (兰岗镇), Shiyan (石岩镇)

Townships:

- Jiangnan Township (江南乡), Sanling Township (三陵乡), Wolong Township (卧龙乡), Mahe Township (马河乡), Jingbo Township (镜泊乡)

=== Suifenhe ===
Towns:

- Suifenhe Town (绥芬河镇), Funing (阜宁镇)

=== Dongning County ===
Towns:

- Dongning (东宁镇), Suiyang (绥阳镇), Laoheishan (老黑山镇), Daduchuan (大肚川镇), Daohe (道河镇), Sanchakou Korean Ethnic Town (三岔口朝鲜族镇)

Townships:

- Gonghe Township (共和乡), Jinchang Township (金厂乡), Huangnihe Township (黄泥河乡), Nantianmen Township (南天门乡)

=== Linkou County ===
Towns:

- Linkou (林口镇), Gucheng (古城镇), Zhujia (朱家镇), Diaoling (刁翎镇), Longzhao (龙爪镇), Lianhua (莲花镇), Liushu (柳树镇), Sandaotong (三道通镇)

Townships:

- Kuishan Township (奎山乡), Qingshan Township (青山乡), Jiantang Township (建堂乡)

== Qiqihar ==
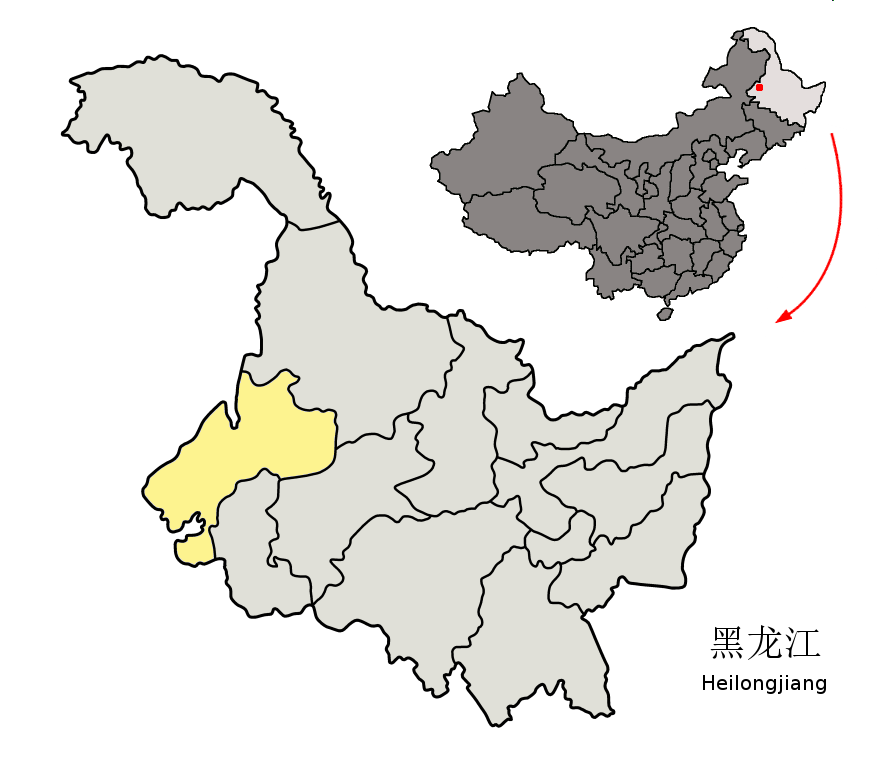
Location of Qiqihar in the province

=== Ang'angxi District ===
Subdistricts:

- Xinxing Subdistrict (新兴街道), Xinjian Subdistrict (新建街道), Daobei Subdistrict (道北街道), Linji Subdistrict (林机街道)

Towns:

- Yushutun (榆树屯镇), Shuishiying Manchu Ethnic Town (水师营满族镇)

=== Fularji District ===
Subdistricts:

- Hong'an Subdistrict (红岸街道), Yanjiang Subdistrict (沿江街道), Tiebei Subdistrict (铁北街道), Beixing Subdistrict (北兴街道), Heping Subdistrict (和平街道), Dianli Subdistrict (电力街道), Xingfu Subdistrict (幸福街道), Hongbaoshi Subdistrict (红宝石街道)

Townships:

- Changqing Township (长青乡), Du'ermenqin Daur Ethnic Township (杜尔门沁达斡尔族乡)

=== Jianhua District ===
Subdistricts:

- Gongjian Road Subdistrict (工建路街道), West Zhonghua Road Subdistrict (中华西路街道), Zhonghua Road Subdistrict (中华路街道), Chongjian Road Subdistrict (重建路街道), Jianshe Road Subdistrict (建设路街道), Bukui Avenue Subdistrict (卜奎大街街道), North Bukui Avenue Subdistrict (卜奎北大街街道), South Bukui Avenue Subdistrict (卜奎南大街街道), Wenhua Avenue Subdistrict (文化大街街道), Xinming Avenue Subdistrict (新明街街道), Huxi Road Subdistrict (湖西路街道)

=== Longsha District ===
Subdistricts:

- Wulong Subdistrict (五龙街道), Zhengyang Subdistrict (正阳街道), Jiang'an Subdistrict (江安街道), Hubin Subdistrict (湖滨街道), Caihong Subdistrict (彩虹街道), Nanhang Subdistrict (南航街道)

=== Meilisi Daur District ===
The only subdistrict is Meilisi Subdistrict (梅里斯街道)

Towns:

- Ya'ersai (雅尔塞镇), Dahudian (达呼店镇), Gonghe (共和镇), Woniutu Daur Ethnic Town (卧牛吐达斡尔族镇)

Townships:

- Meilisi Township (梅里斯乡), Manggetu Daur Ethnic Township (莽格吐达斡尔族乡)

=== Nianzishan District ===
Subdistricts:

- Fanrong Subdistrict (繁荣街道), Fuqiang Subdistrict (富强街道), Yuejin Subdistrict (跃进街道), Dong'an Subdistrict (东安街道)

The only township is Shuguang Township (曙光乡)

=== Tiefeng District ===
Subdistricts:

- Longhua Subdistrict (龙华街道), Xingongdi Subdistrict (新工地街道), Zhanqian Subdistrict (站前街道), Nanpu Subdistrict (南浦街道), Donghu Subdistrict (东湖街道), Shuguang Subdistrict (曙光街道), Tongdong Subdistrict (通东街道), Guangrong Subdistrict (光荣街道), Beijuzhai Subdistrict (北局宅街道)

The only township is Zhalong Township (扎龙乡)

=== Nehe City ===
Subdistricts:

- Tongjiang Subdistrict (通江街道), Yuting Subdistrict (雨亭街道)

Towns:

- Laha (拉哈镇), Longhe (龙河镇), Nenan (讷南镇), Tongnan (通南镇), Laolai (老莱镇), Erkeqian (二克浅镇), Xuetian (学田镇), Changfa (长发镇), Tongyi (同义镇), Jiujing (九井镇), Liuhe (六合镇)

Townships:

- Kongguo Township (孔国乡), Hesheng Township (和盛乡), Tongxin Township (同心乡), Xingwang Evenk Ethnic Township (兴旺鄂温克族乡)

=== Baiquan County ===
Towns:

- Baiquan (拜泉镇), Sandao (三道镇), Xingnong (兴农镇), Changchun (长春镇), Longquan (龙泉镇), Guofu (国富镇), Fuqiang (富强镇)

Townships:

- Xinsheng Township (新生乡), Xingguo Township (兴国乡), Shangsheng Township (上升乡), Xinghua Township (兴华乡), Dazhong Township (大众乡), Fengchan Township (丰产乡), Yongqin Township (永勤乡), Ziqiang Township (自强乡), Ainong Township (爱农乡)

=== Fuyu County ===
Towns:

- Fuyu (富裕镇), Fulu (富路镇), Fuhai (富海镇), Erdaowan (二道湾镇), Long'anqiao (龙安桥镇)

Townships:

- Taha Manchu and Daur Ethnic Township (塔哈满族达斡尔族乡), Fanrong Township (繁荣乡), Youyi Daur, Manchu, and Kirghiz Ethnic Township (友谊达斡尔族满族柯尔克孜族乡), Shaowen Township (绍文乡), Zhonghou Township (忠厚乡)

=== Gannan County ===
Towns:

- Gannan (甘南镇), Dongyang (东阳镇), Pingyang (平阳镇)

Townships:

- Weijian Township (宏建乡), Changshan Township (长山乡), Zhongxing Township (中兴乡), Yinhe Township (音河乡), Changjigang Township (长吉岗乡), Xinglong Township (兴隆乡), Jubao Township (巨宝乡), Chahayang Township (查哈阳乡), Baoshan Township (宝山乡)

=== Kedong County ===
Towns:

- Kedong (克东镇), Baoquan (宝泉镇), Qianfeng (乾丰镇), Yugang (玉岗镇)

Townships:

- Changsheng Township (昌盛乡), Runjin Township (润津乡), Jincheng Township (金城乡)

=== Keshan County ===
Towns:

- Keshan (克山镇), Beixing (北兴镇), Xicheng (西城镇), Gucheng (古城镇), Beilian (北联镇), Xihe (西河镇)

Townships:

- Henan Township (河南乡), Shuanghe Township (双河乡), Hebei Township (河北乡), Gubei Township (古北乡), Xilian Township (西联乡), Fazhan Township (发展乡), Xijian Township (西建乡), Xianghua Township (向华乡), Shuguang Township (曙光乡)

=== Longjiang County ===
Towns:

- Longjiang (龙江镇), Jingxing (景星镇), Longxing (龙兴镇), Shanquan (山泉镇), Qikeshu (七棵树镇)

Townships:

- Duibao Township (对宝乡), Yaluhe Township (雅鲁河乡), Yongfa Township (永发乡), Jiqinhe Township (济沁河乡), Touzhan Township (头站乡), Xiangshan Township (杏山乡), Donghua Township (东华乡), Baishan Township (白山乡), Heshan Township (合山乡), Heigang Township (黑岗乡), Luhe Township (鲁河乡), Huamin Township (华民乡), Fada Township (发达乡)

=== Tailai County ===
Towns:

- Tailai (泰来镇), Tazicheng (塔子城镇), Pingyang (平洋镇), Daxing (大兴镇), Tangchi (汤池镇), Jiangqiao Mongol Ethnic Town (江桥蒙古族镇), Heping (和平镇), Keli (克利镇)

Townships:

- Ningjiang Mongol Ethnic Township (宁姜蒙古族乡), Shengli Mongol Ethnic Township (胜利蒙古族乡)

=== Yi'an County ===
Towns:

- Yi'an (依安镇), Yilong (依龙镇), Shuangyang (双阳镇), Sanxing (三兴镇), Zhongxin (中心镇)

Townships:

- Furao Township (富饶乡), Jiefang Township (解放乡), Yangchun Township (阳春乡), Xinfa Township (新发乡), Taidong Township (太东乡), Shangyou Township (上游乡), Hongxing Township (红星乡), Xianfeng Township (先锋乡), Xintun Township (新屯乡), Xiangqian Township (向前乡), Xinxing Township (新兴乡), Qingfeng Township (庆丰乡), Xiangyang Township (向阳乡)

== Qitaihe ==
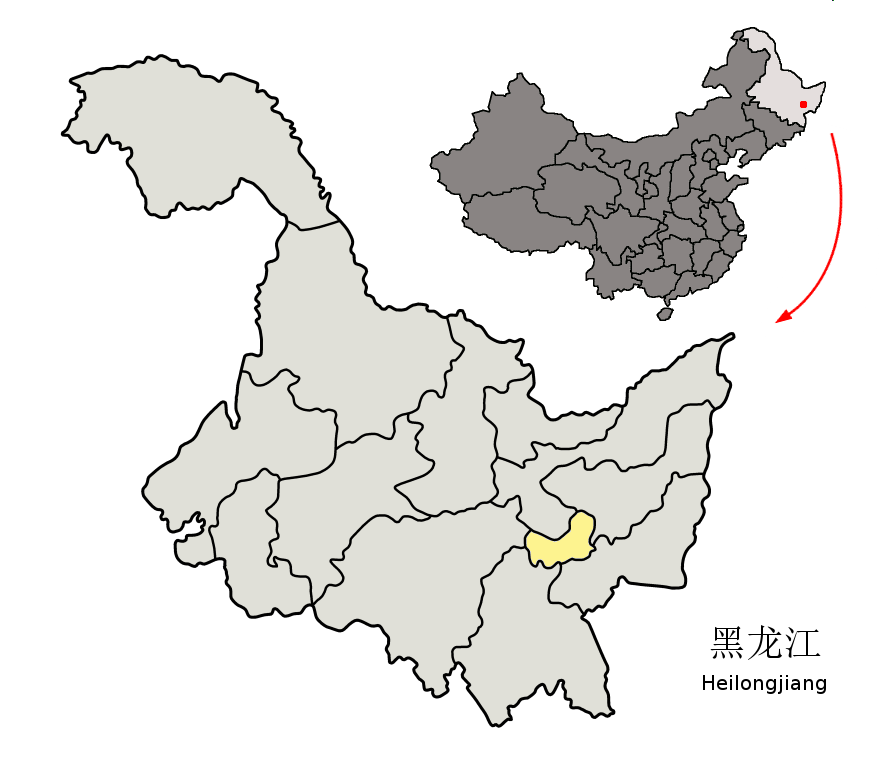
Location of Qitaihe in the province

=== Qiezihe District ===
Subdistricts:

- Xinfu Subdistrict (新富街道), Dongfeng Subdistrict (东风街道), Fuqiang Subdistrict (富强街道), Xiangyang Subdistrict (向阳街道), Longhu Subdistrict (龙湖街道)

Towns:

- Qiezihe Town (茄子河镇), Hongwei (宏伟镇)

Townships:

- Tieshan Township (铁山乡), Zhongxinhe Township (中心河乡)

=== Taoshan District ===
Subdistricts:

- Taoxi Subdistrict (桃西街道), Taodong Subdistrict (桃东街道), Taonan Subdistrict (桃南街道), Taobei Subdistrict (桃北街道), Taoshan Subdistrict (桃山街道), Xinggang Subdistrict (兴岗街道)

Towns:

- Wanbaohe (万宝河镇)

=== Xinxing District ===
Subdistricts:

- Xinghua Subdistrict (兴华街道), Xincheng Subdistrict (新城街道), Xinjian Subdistrict (新建街道), Beishan Subdistrict (北山街道), Xinli Subdistrict (新立街道), Henan Subdistrict (河南街道), Gangyaogou Subdistrict (缸窑沟街道), Xinhe Subdistrict (新合街道), Yuexiu Subdistrict (越秀街道), Xin'an Subdistrict (新安街道)

The only town is Hongqi (红旗镇), and the only township is Changxing Township (长兴乡)

=== Boli County ===
Subdistricts:

- Xinqi Subdistrict (新起街道), Xinhua Subdistrict (新华街道), Yuanming Subdistrict (元明街道), Tiexi Subdistrict (铁西街道), Chengxi Subdistrict (城西街道)

Towns:

- Boli (勃利镇), Woken (倭肯镇), Shuanghe (双河镇), Xiaowuzhan (小五站镇), Dasizhan (大四站镇)

Townships:

- Qingshan Township (青山乡), Yongheng Township (永恒乡), Qiangken Township (抢垦乡), Xingshu Korean Ethnic Township (杏树朝鲜族乡), Jixing Korean and Manchu Ethnic Township (吉兴朝鲜族满族乡)

== Shuangyashan ==
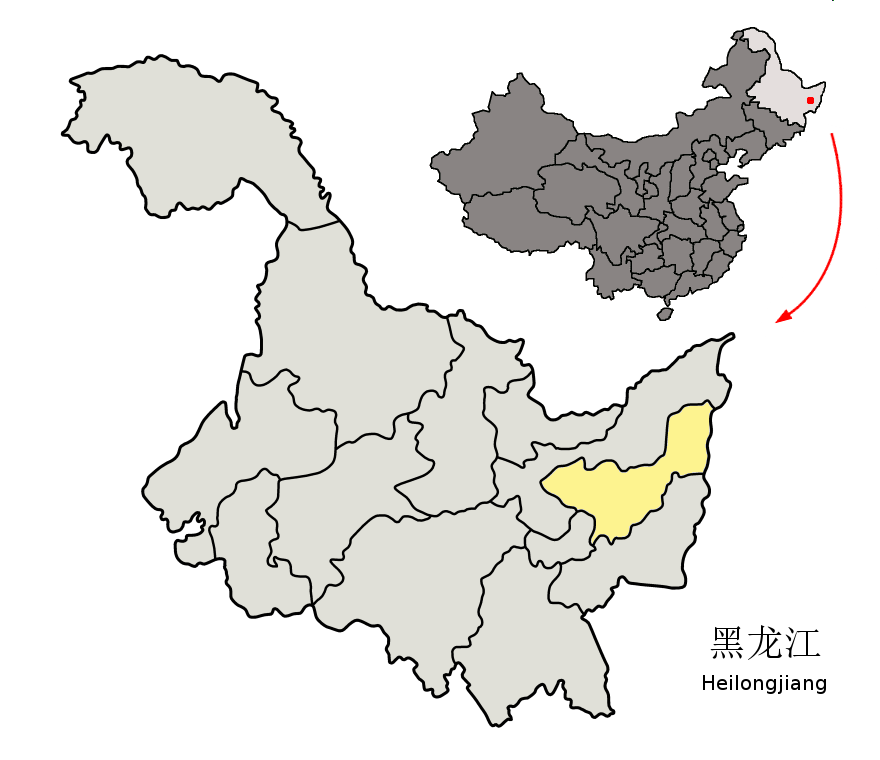
Location of Shuangyashan in the province

=== Baoshan District ===
Subdistricts:

- Hongqi Subdistrict (红旗街道), Yuejin Subdistrict (跃进街道), Qixing Subdistrict (七星街道), Shuangyang Subdistrict (双阳街道), Xin'an Subdistrict (新安街道), East Baowei Subdistrict (东保卫街道), Dianchang Subdistrict (电厂街道)

The only town is Qixing (七星镇)

=== Jianshan District ===
Subdistricts:

- Bama Road Subdistrict (八马路街道), Erma Road Subdistrict (二马路街道), Zhongxin Station Subdistrict (中心站街道), Fu'an Subdistrict (富安街道), Yaodi Subdistrict (窑地街道), Tiexi Subdistrict (铁西街道)

The only township is Anbang Township (安邦乡)

=== Lingdong District ===
Subdistricts:

- Zhongxin Subdistrict (中心街道), Beishan Subdistrict (北山街道), Nanshan Subdistrict (南山街道), Dongshan Subdistrict (东山街道), Xishan Subdistrict (西山街道), Zhongshan Subdistrict (中山街道)

The only township is Changsheng Township (长胜乡)

=== Sifangtai District ===
Subdistricts:

- Central Zhenxing Road Subdistrict (振兴中路街道), East Zhenxing Road Subdistrict (振兴东路街道), Jixian Subdistrict (集贤街道), Dongrong Subdistrict (东荣街道)

The only town is Taibao (太保镇)

=== Baoqing County ===
Towns:

- Baoqing Town (宝清镇), Qixingpao (七星泡镇), Qingyuan (青原镇), Longtou (龙头镇), Xiaochengzi (小城子镇), Jiaxinzi (夹信子镇)

Townships:

- Chaoyang Township (朝阳乡), Qixinghe Township (七星河乡), Wanjinshan Township (万金山乡), Jiashanzi Township (尖山子乡)

=== Jixian County ===
Towns:

- Fuli (福利镇), Jixian (集贤镇), Fengle (丰乐镇), Shengchang (升昌镇), Taiping (太平镇)

Townships:

- Yong'an Township (永安乡), Yaotun Township (腰屯乡), Lianming Township (联明乡), Shagang Township (沙岗乡), Liming Township (黎明乡), Shanqu Township (山区乡), Xing'an Township (兴安乡), Guoshushifanchang (果树示范场)

=== Raohe County ===
Towns:

- Raohe (饶河镇), Xiaojiahe (小佳河镇), Xifeng (西丰镇), Wulindong (五林洞镇)

Townships:

- Yongle Township (永乐乡), Datonghe Township (大通河乡), Xilinzi Township (西林子乡), Dajiahe Township (大佳河乡), Shanli Township (山里乡), Luyuan Township (芦源乡), Sipai Nani Ethnic Township (四排赫哲族乡)

=== Youyi County ===
Towns:

- Youyi (友谊镇), Xinglong (兴隆镇), Fenggang (凤岗镇), Longshan (龙山镇)

Townships:

- Xingsheng Township (兴盛乡), Dongjian Township (东建乡), Qingfeng Township (庆丰乡), Youlin Township (友邻乡), Xinzhen Township (新镇乡), Jianshe Township (建设乡), Chengfu Korean and Manchu Ethnic Township (成富朝鲜族满族乡)

== Suihua ==
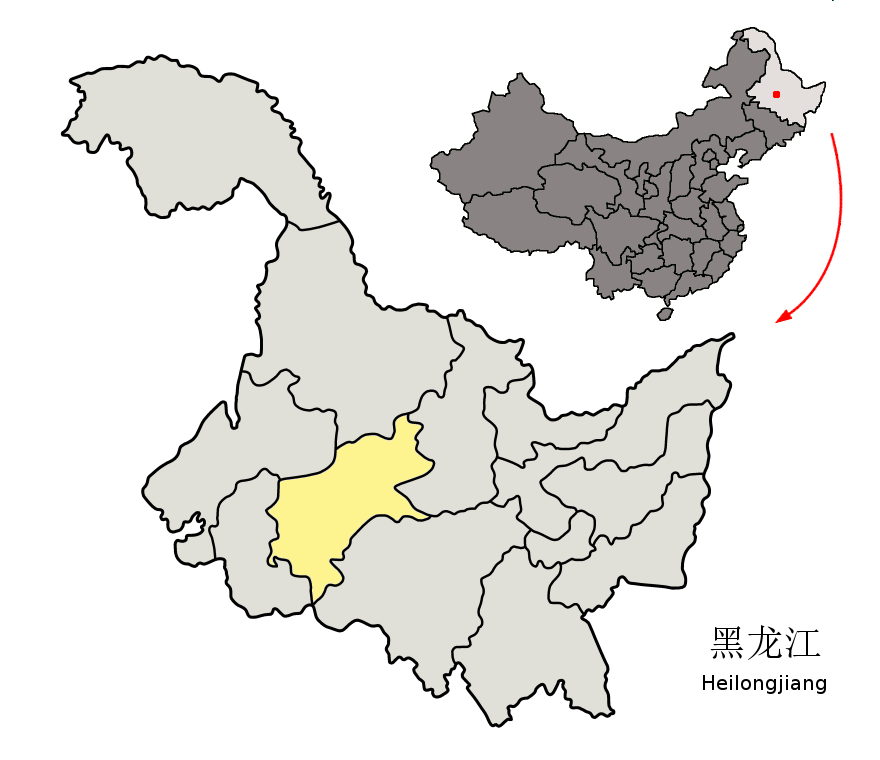
Location of Suihua in the province

=== Beilin District ===
Subdistricts:

- Zilai Subdistrict (紫来街道), Ailu Subdistrict (爱路街道), Dayou Subdistrict (大有街道), Jitai Subdistrict (吉泰街道), Dongxing Subdistrict (东兴街道), Beilin Subdistrict (北林街道)

Towns:

- Baoshan (宝山镇), Suisheng (绥胜镇), Xichangfa (西长发镇), Yong'an (永安镇), Taipingchuan (太平川镇), Qinjia (秦家镇), Shuanghe (双河镇), Sanhe (三河镇), Sifangtai (四方台镇), Jinhe (津河镇), Zhangwei (张维镇), Dongjin (东津镇)

Townships:

- Hongqi Manchu Ethnic Township (红旗满族乡), Liangang Township (连岗乡), Xinhua Township (新华乡), Xingfu Township (兴福乡), Dongfu Township (东富乡), Sanjing Township (三井乡), Wuying Township (五营乡), Xinghe Korean Ethnic Township (兴和朝鲜族县)

=== Anda ===
Subdistricts:

- Xinxing Subdistrict (新兴街道), Tiexi Subdistrict (铁西街道), Anhong Subdistrict (安虹街道)

Towns:

- Anda (安达镇), Jixinggang (吉星岗镇), Renmin (任民镇), Laohugang (老虎岗镇), Zhongben (中本镇), Taipingzhuang (太平庄镇), Wanbaoshan (万宝山镇), Yangcao (羊草镇), Changde (昌德镇), Shengping (升平镇)

Townships:

- Qingkenpao Township (青肯泡乡), Huoshishan Township (火石山乡), Wolitun Township (卧里屯乡), Xianyuan Township (先源乡)

=== Hailun ===
Towns:

- Hailun Town (海伦镇), Dongfeng (东风镇), Xiangfu (祥富镇), Haixing (海兴镇), Lunhe (伦河镇), Gonghe (共合镇), Haibei (海北镇)

Townships:

- Qianjin Township (前进乡), Xiangrong Township (向荣乡), Changfa Township (长发乡), Donglin Township (东林乡), Hainan Township (海南乡), Leye Township (乐业乡), Gongrong Township (共荣乡), Fumin Township (福民乡), Fengshan Township (丰山乡), Yongfu Township (永富乡), Baixiang Township (百祥乡), Lianfa Township (联发乡), Yonghe Township (永合乡), Aimin Township (爱民乡), Zhayinhe Township (扎音河乡), Shuanglu Township (双录乡)

=== Zhaodong ===
Subdistricts:

- Xiyuan District (西园区), Chaoyang District (朝阳区), Zhengyang District (正阳区), Dongsheng District (东升区)

Towns:

- Zhaodong Town (肇东镇), Sizhan (四站镇), Wuzhan (五站镇), Songzhan (宋站镇), Changwu (昌五镇), Shangjia (尚家镇), Laozhou (涝洲镇), Limudian (里木店镇), Jiangjia (姜家镇), Wuliming (五里明镇), Liming (黎明镇)

Townships:

- Haicheng Township (海城乡), Xuanhua Township (宣化乡), Anmin Township (安民乡), Mingjiu Township (明久乡), Honghe Township (洪河乡), Yuejin Township (跃进乡), Xiangyang Township (向阳乡), Taiping Township (太平乡), Dechang Township (德昌乡), Xibali Township (西八里乡)

=== Lanxi County ===
Towns:

- Lanxi (兰西镇), Yulin (榆林镇), Linjiang (临江镇), Pingshan (平山镇)

Townships:

- Lanjiao Township (兰郊乡), Kangrong Township (康荣乡), Lanhe Township (兰河乡), Changjiang Township (长江乡), Changgang Township (长岗乡), Hongguang Township (红光乡), Bei'an Township (北安乡), Fendou Township (奋斗乡), Hongxing Township (红星乡), Shengli Township (胜利乡), Yuanda Township (远大乡), Yixin Township (移新乡), Liaoyuan Township (燎原乡), Xinghuo Township (星火乡)

=== Mingshui County ===
Towns:

- Mingshui (明水镇), Tongda (通达镇), Xingren (兴仁镇), Yongtou (永兴镇), Chongde (崇德镇), You'ai (友爱镇)

Townships:

- Tuanjie Township (团结乡), Shuangxing Township (双兴乡), Dongxing Township (东兴乡), Yongjiu Township (永久乡), Shuren Township (树人乡), Guangrong Township (光荣乡), Fanrong Township (繁荣乡), Tongquan Township (通泉乡), Yulin Township (育林乡)

=== Qing'an County ===
Towns:

- Qing'an (庆安镇), Daluo (大罗镇), Ping'an (平安镇), Jiusheng (久胜镇), Lelao (勤劳镇), Minle (民乐镇)

Townships:

- Xinmin Township (新民乡), Jianmin Township (建民乡), Jubaoshan Township (巨宝山乡), Fengshou Township (丰收乡), Xinsheng Township (新胜乡), Liangli Township (两利乡), Fengtian Township (丰田乡), Fazhan Township (发展乡), Tongle Township (同乐乡), Zhifu Township (致富乡), Yuanbao Township (元宝乡), Shuangsheng Township (欢胜乡)

=== Qinggang County ===
Towns:

- Qinggang (青冈镇), Zhonghe (中和镇), Luhe (芦河镇), Xinghua (兴华镇), Yongfeng (永丰镇), Huoxiang (祯祥镇)

Townships:

- Changsheng Township (昌盛乡), Zhagang Township (柞岗乡), Minzheng Township (民政乡), Desheng Township (德胜乡), Laodong Township (劳动乡), Yingchun Township (迎春乡), Lianfeng Township (连丰乡), Xincun Township (新村乡), Jianshe Township (建设乡)

=== Suileng County ===
Towns:

- Suileng (绥棱镇), Shangji (上集镇), Sihaidian (四海店镇), Shuangchahe (双岔河镇)

Townships:

- Kaoshan Township (靠山乡), Houtou Township (后头乡), Ni'erhe Township (泥尔河乡), Changshan Township (长山乡), Geshan Township (阁山乡), Suizhong Township (绥中乡), Keyinhe Township (克音河乡)

=== Wangkui County ===
Towns:

- Wangkui (望奎镇), Lianhua (莲花镇), Tongjiang (通江镇), Weixing (卫星镇), Haifeng (海丰镇), Huiqi (惠七镇)

Townships:

- Huojian Township (火箭乡), Dongjiao Township (东郊乡), Dengta Township (灯塔乡), Dongsheng Township (东升乡), Gongliu Township (恭六乡), Lingshan Township (灵山乡), Housan Township (后三乡), Furao Township (富饶乡), Xianfeng Township (先锋乡), Fuyuan Township (富源乡), Huancheng Township (环城乡), Minsan Township (敏三乡), Xiangbai Manchu Ethnic Township (厢白满族乡)

== Yichun ==
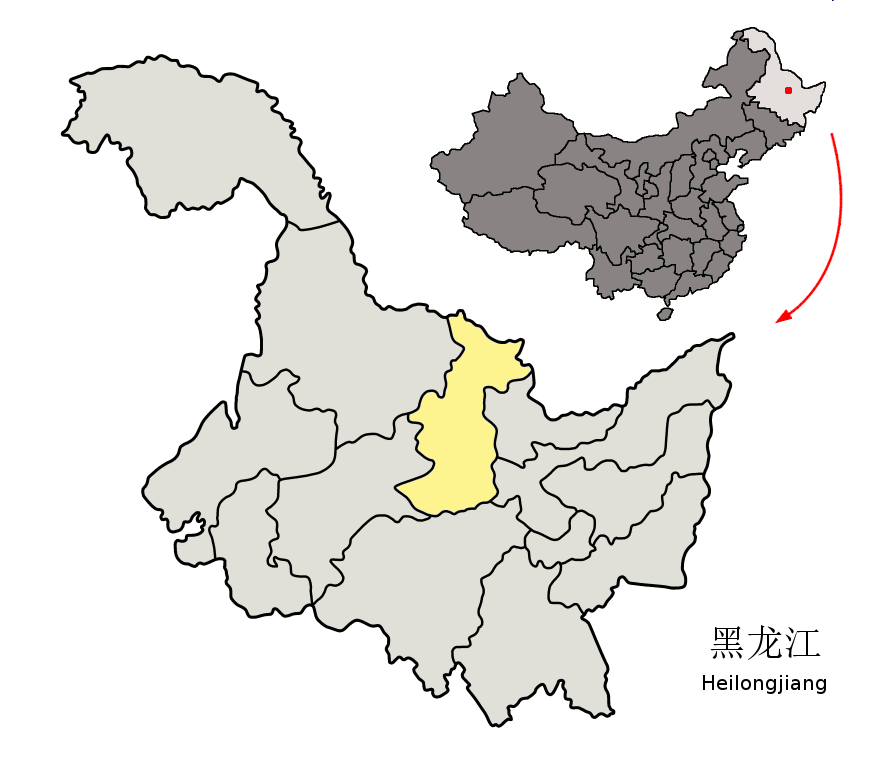
Location of Yichun in the province

=== Cuiluan District ===
Subdistricts:

- Xiangyang Subdistrict (向阳街道), Shuguang Subdistrict (曙光街道)

=== Dailing District ===
The only subdistrict is Dailing Subdistrict (带岭街道).

=== Hongxing District ===
The only subdistrict is Hongxing Subdistrict (红星街道).

=== Jinshantun District ===
Subdistricts:

- Fendou Subdistrict (奋斗街道), Jinshan Subdistrict (金山街道)

=== Meixi District ===
The only subdistrict is Meixi Subdistrict (美溪街道)

=== Nancha District ===
Subdistricts:

- Dongsheng Subdistrict (东升街道), Lianhe Subdistrict (联合街道), Xishui Subdistrict (西水街道)

Towns:

- Chenming (晨明镇), Haolianghe (浩良河镇)

The only township is Yingchun Township (迎春乡)

=== Shangganling District ===
The only subdistrict is Hongshan Subdistrict (红山街道)

=== Tangwanghe District ===
Subdistricts:

- Henan Subdistrict (河南街道), Henan Subdistrict (河北街道)

=== Wumahe District ===
The only subdistrict is Wumahe Subdistrict (乌马河街道)

=== Wuyiling District ===
The only subdistrict is Wuyiling Subdistrict (乌伊岭街道)

=== Wuying District ===
Subdistricts:

- Wuying Subdistrict (五营街道), Wuxing Subdistrict (五星街道)

=== Xilin District ===
Subdistricts:

- Xilin Subdistrict (西林街道), Xinxing Subdistrict (新兴街道), Taiqing Subdistrict (苔青街道)

=== Xinqing District ===
Subdistricts:

- Xinqing Subdistrict (新青街道), Xing'an Subdistrict (兴安街道)

=== Yichun District ===
Subdistricts:

- Qianjin Subdistrict (前进街道), Hongsheng Subdistrict (红升街道), Xuri Subdistrict (旭日街道), Chaoyang Subdistrict (朝阳街道), Dongsheng Subdistrict (东升街道)

=== Youhao District ===
Subdistricts:

- Youhao Subdistrict (友好街道), Shuangzihe Subdistrict (双子河街道), Tielin Subdistrict (铁林街道)

=== Tieli ===
Towns:

- Tieli Town (铁力镇), Shuangfeng (双丰镇), Taoshan (桃山镇), Langxiang (朗乡镇)

Townships:

- Wangyang Township (王杨乡), Gongnong Township (工农乡), Nianfeng Township (年丰乡)

=== Jiayin County ===
Towns:

- Chaoyang (朝阳镇), Wuyun (乌云镇), Wulaga (乌拉嗄镇)

Townships:

- Changsheng Township (常胜乡), Xiangyang Township (向阳乡), Hujia Township (沪嘉乡), Hongguang Township (红光乡), Baoxing Township (保兴乡), Qingshan Township (青山乡)
