= Dongsheng (disambiguation) =

Dongsheng (东胜区) is a district of Ordos City, Inner Mongolia, PRC.

Dongsheng may also refer to the following locations in the PRC:

- Dongsheng, Beijing (东升地区), area of Haidian District

== Towns ==
Written as "东升镇":

- Dongsheng, Guangdong, in Zhongshan
- Dongsheng, Hubei, in Shishou, Jingzhou, Hubei
- Dongsheng, Jiangxi, in Pengze County
- Dongsheng, Nanchong, in Yingshan County, Sichuan

== Townships ==
Written as "东胜乡":

- Dongsheng Township, Bei'an, Heilongjiang
- Dongsheng Township, Baicheng, in Taobei District, Baicheng, Jilin
- Dongsheng Township, Anyue County, Sichuan

Written as "东升乡":

- Dongsheng Township, Gansu, in Jingyuan County
- Dongsheng Township, Wangkui County, Heilongjiang
- Dongsheng Township, Taonan, Jilin

== Subdistricts ==
- Dongsheng Subdistrict, Changchun (东盛街道), in Erdao District
- Dongsheng Subdistrict, Ningbo (东胜街道), in Yinzhou District

Written as "东升街道":

- Dongsheng Subdistrict, Bengbu, in Longzihu District, Bengbu, Anhui
- Dongsheng Subdistrict, Fuzhou, in Cangshan District
- Dongsheng Subdistrict, Nancha District, Yichun, Heilongjiang
- Dongsheng Subdistrict, Yichun District, Yichun, Heilongjiang
- Dongsheng Subdistrict, Shuangliu District, Chengdu, Sichuan
