= Hongxing =

Hongxing may refer to:

- Hongxing, Tibet, a village in the Tibet Autonomous Region of China

In the People's Republic of China:

- Hongxing District, a district of the city of Yichun, Heilongjiang province
- Hongxing, Harbin, a town in the Harbin prefecture of Heilongjiang
- Hongxing, Mingshan County, a town in the Mingshan County of Sichuan
- Hongxing Township, Yi County, Anhui, a township-level division of Anhui
- Hongxing Township, Yongtai County, a township-level division of Fujian
- Hongxing Township, Zhao'an County, a township-level division of Fujian
- Hongxing Subdistrict, Baoding, a township-level division of Hebei
- Hongxing Subdistrict, Yichun, Heilongjiang, a township-level division of Heilongjiang
- Hongxing Township, Jixi, a township-level division of Heilongjiang
- Hongxing Township, Lanxi County, a township-level division of Heilongjiang
- Hongxing Township, Yi'an County, a township-level division of Heilongjiang
