= Heminghu =

Heminghu 鹤鸣湖镇
- Town
- Location in Heilongjiang Heminghu (China)
- Coordinates: 47°13′48″N 124°42′40″E
- Country: People's Republic of China
- Province: Heilongjiang
- Prefecture-level city: Daqing
- County: Lindian
- Village-level divisions: 12 villages 1 fishery
- Elevation: 152 m (499 ft)
- Time zone: UTC+8 (China Standard)
- Area code: 0459

Heminghu (simplified Chinese: 鹤鸣湖; traditional Chinese: 鶴鳴湖; pinyin: Hèmínghú) is a town of Lindian County in western Heilongjiang province, China, located about 13 kilometres (8.1 mi) northwest of the county seat along G10 Suifenhe–Manzhouli Expressway. As of 2018, it has 12 villages and 1 fishery under its administration.

Before 2015 it was known as Sanhe Township (三合乡).

== See also ==
- List of township-level divisions of Heilongjiang
