= Xintun =

Xintun (新屯) may refer to the following locations in China:

- Xintun, Guizhou, town in Wangmo County
- Xintun Township, Hebei, in Zaoqiang County
- Xintun Township, Heilongjiang, in Yi'an County
- Xintun Subdistrict, Dongzhou District, Fushun, Liaoning
