= Xinghua Township, Huma County =

Xinghua Township 兴华乡
- Township
- Location in Heilongjiang Xinghua Township (China)
- Coordinates: 52°07′53″N 126°01′14″E
- Country: People's Republic of China
- Province: Heilongjiang
- Prefecture: Da Hinggan Ling
- County: Huma
- Village-level divisions: 6 villages
- Elevation: 240 m (790 ft)
- Time zone: UTC+8 (China Standard)
- Area code: 0457

Xinghua Township (simplified Chinese: 兴华乡; traditional Chinese: 興華鄉; pinyin: Xīnghuá Xiāng) is a township of Huma County in the east of Da Hinggan Ling Prefecture in far northern Heilongjiang province, China, located about 63 kilometres (39 mi) northwest of the county seat. As of 2011, it has six villages under its administration.

== See also ==
- List of township-level divisions of Heilongjiang
