= Dongfeng, Hailun =

Dongfeng 东风镇
- Town
- Location in Heilongjiang Dongfeng (China)
- Coordinates: 47°24′43″N 127°06′19″E
- Country: People's Republic of China
- Province: Heilongjiang
- Prefecture-level city: Suihua
- County-level city: Hailun
- Elevation: 261 m (856 ft)
- Time zone: UTC+8 (China Standard)
- Area code: 0455

Dongfeng (simplified Chinese: 东风; traditional Chinese: 東風; pinyin: Dōngfēng; lit. 'east wind') is a town of Hailun City in west-central Heilongjiang province, China, located about 12 km (7.5 mi) from downtown Hailun. As of 2011, it has 13 villages under its administration.

== See also ==
- List of township-level divisions of Heilongjiang
