= Xinhua Township, Heilongjiang =

Xinhua Township 新华乡
- Township
- Location in Heilongjiang Xinhua Township (China)
- Coordinates: 46°38′36″N 126°50′33″E
- Country: People's Republic of China
- Province: Heilongjiang
- Prefecture-level city: Suihua
- District: Beilin
- Village-level divisions: 7 villages
- Elevation: 157 m (515 ft)
- Time zone: UTC+8 (China Standard)
- Area code: 0455

Xinhua Township (simplified Chinese: 新华乡; traditional Chinese: 新華鄉; pinyin: Xīnhuá Xiāng; lit. 'new China') is a township of Beilin District, in the western suburbs of Suihua, Heilongjiang, People's Republic of China, located more than 10 kilometres (6.2 mi) west of downtown. As of 2011, it has seven villages under its administration.

== See also ==
- List of township-level divisions of Heilongjiang
