= Anle Subdistrict, Harbin =

Anle Subdistrict 安乐街道
- Subdistrict
- Location in Heilongjiang
- Coordinates: 45.7168°N 126.6526°E
- Country: People's Republic of China
- Province: Heilongjiang
- Prefecture-level city: Harbin
- District: Xiangfang District
- Time zone: UTC+8 (China Standard)

Anle Subdistrict (simplified Chinese: 安乐街道; traditional Chinese: 安樂街道; pinyin: Ānlè Jiēdào) is a subdistrict in Xiangfang District, Harbin, Heilongjiang province, China. As of 2018, it has 3 residential communities under its administration.

== See also ==
- List of township-level divisions of Heilongjiang
