= Aijian Subdistrict =

- Subdistrict

Chinese transcription(s)
- Interactive map of Aijian Subdistrict
- Coordinates: 45°45′37.688″N 126°35′36.240″E
- Country: China
- Province: Heilongjiang
- Prefecture: Harbin
- District: Daoli District
- Time zone: UTC+8 (China Standard Time)

Aijian Subdistrict (Chinese: 爱建街道) is a township-level division situated in the Harbin prefecture of Heilongjiang, China.

== See also ==
- List of township-level divisions of Heilongjiang
