= Xinghua Subdistrict, Qitaihe =

Xinghua Subdistrict 兴华街道
- Subdistrict
- Location in Heilongjiang Xinghua (China)
- Coordinates: 45°47′42″N 130°53′00″E
- Country: People's Republic of China
- Province: Heilongjiang
- Prefecture-level city: Qitaihe
- District: Xinxing
- Village-level divisions: 2 residential communities
- Elevation: 169 m (554 ft)
- Time zone: UTC+8 (China Standard)
- Area code: 0464

Xinghua Subdistrict (simplified Chinese: 兴华街道; traditional Chinese: 興華街道; pinyin: Xīnghuá Jiēdào) is a subdistrict of Xinxing District, Qitaihe, Heilongjiang, People's Republic of China. As of 2011, it has two residential communities (社区) under its administration.

== See also ==
- List of township-level divisions of Heilongjiang
