= Dongsheng Township, Wangkui County =

Dongsheng Township 东升乡
- Township
- Location in Heilongjiang Dongsheng Township (China)
- Coordinates: 47°00′27″N 126°53′51″E
- Country: People's Republic of China
- Province: Heilongjiang
- Prefecture-level city: Suihua
- County: Wangkui
- Elevation: 240 m (790 ft)
- Time zone: UTC+8 (China Standard)

Dongsheng Township (simplified Chinese: 东升乡; traditional Chinese: 東升鄉; pinyin: Dōngshēng Xiāng; lit. 'east rise') is a township Wangkui County in west-central Heilongjiang province, China, located 36 kilometres (22 mi) northeast of the county seat. As of 2011, it has 6 villages under its administration.

== See also ==
- List of township-level divisions of Heilongjiang
