= Dongsheng, Nanchong =

Dongsheng 东升镇
- Town
- Location in Sichuan
- Coordinates: 31°04′36″N 106°38′40″E
- Country: People's Republic of China
- Province: Sichuan
- Prefecture-level city: Nanchong
- County: Yingshan
- Elevation: 322 m (1,056 ft)
- Time zone: UTC+8 (China Standard)

Dongsheng (simplified Chinese: 东升; traditional Chinese: 東升; pinyin: Dōngshēng; lit. 'east ascends') is a town in Yingshan County in northeastern Sichuan province, China, located around 7.5 kilometres (4.7 mi) east of the county seat. As of 2011, it has 20 villages under its administration.

== See also ==
- List of township-level divisions of Sichuan
