= Hanjiayuan =

Hanjiayuan 韩家园镇
- Town
- Location in Heilongjiang Hanjiayuan (China)
- Coordinates: 52°04′17″N 125°45′44″E
- Country: People's Republic of China
- Province: Heilongjiang
- Prefecture: Da Hinggan Ling Prefecture
- County: Huma County
- Elevation: 289 m (948 ft)
- Time zone: UTC+8 (China Standard Time)

Hanjiayuan (simplified Chinese: 韩家园; traditional Chinese: 韓家園; pinyin: Hánjiāyuán; lit. 'Han family's yard') is a town of Huma County, Da Hinggan Ling Prefecture, in the far north of Heilongjiang province, China. As of 2011, it has 5 villages under its administration.

== See also ==
- List of township-level divisions of Heilongjiang
