= Yangshu Township =

Coordinates: 45.4851°N 126.8604°E

Yangshu Township 杨树乡
- Township

Chinese transcription(s)
- Interactive map of Yangshu Township
- Country: China
- Province: Heilongjiang
- Prefecture: Harbin
- District: Acheng District
- Time zone: UTC+8 (China Standard Time)

Yangshu Township (Chinese: 杨树乡) is a township-level division situated in the Acheng district of Harbin, Heilongjiang province, China. It is situated 5 km southwest of Acheng city and has a population of 32000.

== See also ==
- List of township-level divisions of Heilongjiang
