= Xiangyang Subdistrict, Jixi =

Xiangyang Subdistrict 向阳街道
- Subdistrict
- Location in Heilongjiang Xiangyang Subdistrict (China)
- Coordinates: 45°17′40″N 130°58′0″E
- Country: People's Republic of China
- Province: Heilongjiang
- Prefecture-level city: Jixi
- District: Jiguan District
- Time zone: UTC+8 (China Standard)

Xiangyang Subdistrict (Chinese: 向阳街道; pinyin: Xiàngyáng Jiēdào) is a subdistrict in Jiguan District, Jixi, Heilongjiang, China. As of 2018, it has 6 residential communities under its administration.

== See also ==
- List of township-level divisions of Heilongjiang
