= Huiqi =

Huiqi 惠七满族镇
- Town
- Huiqizhen
- Location in Heilongjiang Huiqi (China)
- Coordinates: 47°3′46″N 126°41′1″E
- Country: China
- Province: Heilongjiang
- Prefecture: Suihua
- County: Wangkui
- Village-level divisions: 8

Area
  - Total: 143.3 km^{2} (55.3 sq mi)
- Elevation: 191 m (627 ft)

Population (2018)
  - Total: 26,345
  - Density: 183.8/km^{2} (476.2/sq mi)
- Postal code: 152186
- Area code: 0455

Huiqi (Chinese: 惠七满族镇) is a Manchu ethnic town in Wangkui County, Suihua, Heilongjiang, China. The population of Huiqi was 23,172 in 2010: 11,723 males and 11,449 females; of which, 2,659 were under 15, 18,787 were between 15 and 64 years old and 1,726 were over 64 years old. Huiqi has 8 village-level administrative divisions, of which, Huiqi Village is where the town government is located. In 2011, Huiqi received a total of 12.3 million yuan (1.7 million USD) in tax revenue, mostly originating from local arable crops and the 16 general stores and supermarkets in the business area of Huiqi. Huiqi was originally set up as a township in April 1956, but changed to a town in 1984 and merged with another former town, Qimanchu.

According to several sources, Huiqi was one of several villages that COVID-19 had the worst impact on in Heilongjiang in the first few months of the pandemic. Huiqi also has a monsoon temperate climate Köppen climate classification and an average annual precipitation of 500 to 600 meters, despite its high precipitation, Huiqi is prone to drought natural disasters.
