= Xinhua, Hegang =

Xinhua 新华镇
- Town
- Location in Heilongjiang Xinhua (China)
- Coordinates: 47°06′28″N 130°17′42″E
- Country: People's Republic of China
- Province: Heilongjiang
- Prefecture-level city: Hegang
- District: Dongshan
- Village-level divisions: 1 residential community 10 villages
- Elevation: 122 m (400 ft)
- Time zone: UTC+8 (China Standard)
- Area code: 0468

Xinhua (simplified Chinese: 新华; traditional Chinese: 新華; pinyin: Xīnhuá; lit. 'new China') is a town of Dongshan District, Hegang, Heilongjiang, People's Republic of China, located 23 kilometres (14 mi) south of downtown Hegang near the border with neighbouring Jiamusi City. As of 2011, it has one residential community (社区) and 10 villages under its administration.

== See also ==
- List of township-level divisions of Heilongjiang
