= Xinghua, Qinggang County =

Xinghua 兴华镇
- Town
- Location in Heilongjiang Xinghua (China)
- Coordinates: 47°02′13″N 126°10′59″E
- Country: People's Republic of China
- Province: Heilongjiang
- Prefecture-level city: Suihua
- County: Qinggang County
- Village-level divisions: 12 villages
- Elevation: 174 m (571 ft)
- Time zone: UTC+8 (China Standard)
- Area code: 0455

Xinghua (simplified Chinese: 兴华; traditional Chinese: 興華; pinyin: Xīnghuá) is a town of Qinggang County in western Heilongjiang province, China, located 39 kilometres (24 mi) north-northeast of the county seat. As of 2011, it has 12 villages under its administration.

== See also ==
- List of township-level divisions of Heilongjiang
