= Xinghua Subdistrict, Daqing =

Xinghua Subdistrict 兴化街道
- Subdistrict
- Location in Heilongjiang Xinghua (China)
- Coordinates: 46°31′45″N 125°06′59″E
- Country: People's Republic of China
- Province: Heilongjiang
- Prefecture-level city: Daqing
- District: Longfeng
- Village-level divisions: 6 residential communities
- Elevation: 147 m (482 ft)
- Time zone: UTC+8 (China Standard)
- Postal code: 163714
- Area code: 0459

Xinghua Subdistrict (simplified Chinese: 兴化街道; traditional Chinese: 興化街道; pinyin: Xīnghuà Jiēdào) is a subdistrict of Longfeng District, in the south of Daqing, Heilongjiang, People's Republic of China. As of 2011, it has six residential communities (社区) under its administration.

== See also ==
- List of township-level divisions of Heilongjiang
