= Xinjiang Subdistrict, Harbin =

Xinjiang Subdistrict 新疆街道
- Subdistrict
- Location in Heilongjiang Xinjiang Subdistrict (China)
- Coordinates: 45°36′24″N 126°37′33″E
- Country: People's Republic of China
- Province: Heilongjiang
- Prefecture-level city: Harbin
- District: Pingfang District
- Time zone: UTC+8 (China Standard)

Xinjiang Subdistrict (Chinese: 新疆街道; pinyin: Xīnjiāng Jiēdào) is a subdistrict in Pingfang District, Harbin, Heilongjiang province, China. As of 2018, it has 4 residential communities under its administration.

== See also ==
- List of township-level divisions of Heilongjiang
