= Xintun Township, Heilongjiang =

Xintun Township 新屯乡
- Township
- Location in Heilongjiang Xintun Township (China)
- Coordinates: 47°51′53″N 125°04′56″E
- Country: People's Republic of China
- Province: Heilongjiang
- Prefecture-level city: Qiqihar
- County: Yi'an
- Elevation: 209 m (686 ft)
- Time zone: UTC+8 (China Standard)

Xintun (Chinese: 新屯; pinyin: Xīntún) is a township of Yi'an County in western Heilongjiang province, China, located 18 km (11 mi) west-southwest of the county seat. As of 2011, it has 9 villages under its administration.

== See also ==
- List of township-level divisions of Heilongjiang
