= Dongsheng Subdistrict, Yichun District =

Dongsheng Subdistrict 东升街道
- Subdistrict
- Location in Heilongjiang Dongsheng (China)
- Coordinates: 47°45′37″N 128°56′19″E
- Country: People's Republic of China
- Province: Heilongjiang
- Prefecture-level city: Yichun
- District: Yichun
- Elevation: 231 m (758 ft)
- Time zone: UTC+8 (China Standard)
- Postal code: 153000

Dongsheng Subdistrict (simplified Chinese: 东升街道; traditional Chinese: 東升街道; pinyin: Dōngshēng Jiēdào; lit. 'east rise') is a subdistrict of Yichun District, in the eastern outskirts of the city of Yichun, Heilongjiang, People's Republic of China. As of 2011, it has 3 residential communities (社区) and 4 villages under its administration.

== See also ==
- List of township-level divisions of Heilongjiang
