= Lindian County =

Lindian County 林甸县 Lin-tien
- County
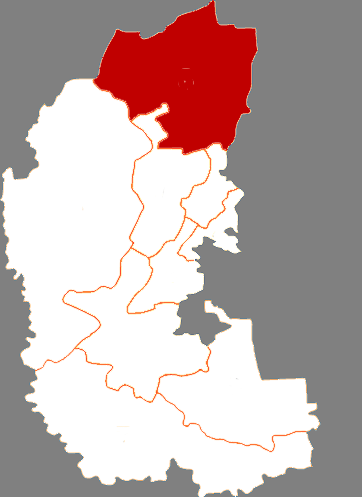

- Location in Heilongjiang
- Coordinates: 47°06′N 124°59′E
- Country: People's Republic of China
- Province: Heilongjiang
- Prefecture-level city: Daqing

Area
  - Total: 3,591 km^{2} (1,386 sq mi)

Population (2010)
  - Total: 244,578
  - Density: 68.11/km^{2} (176.4/sq mi)
- Time zone: UTC+8 (China Standard)

Lindian (Chinese: 林甸; pinyin: Líndiàn) is a county of roughly 10,000 inhabitants under the jurisdiction of Daqing, Heilongjiang province, China. Lindian County is divided into five towns and three townships, among which, the town of Lindian serves as the political and transportation centre of the county.

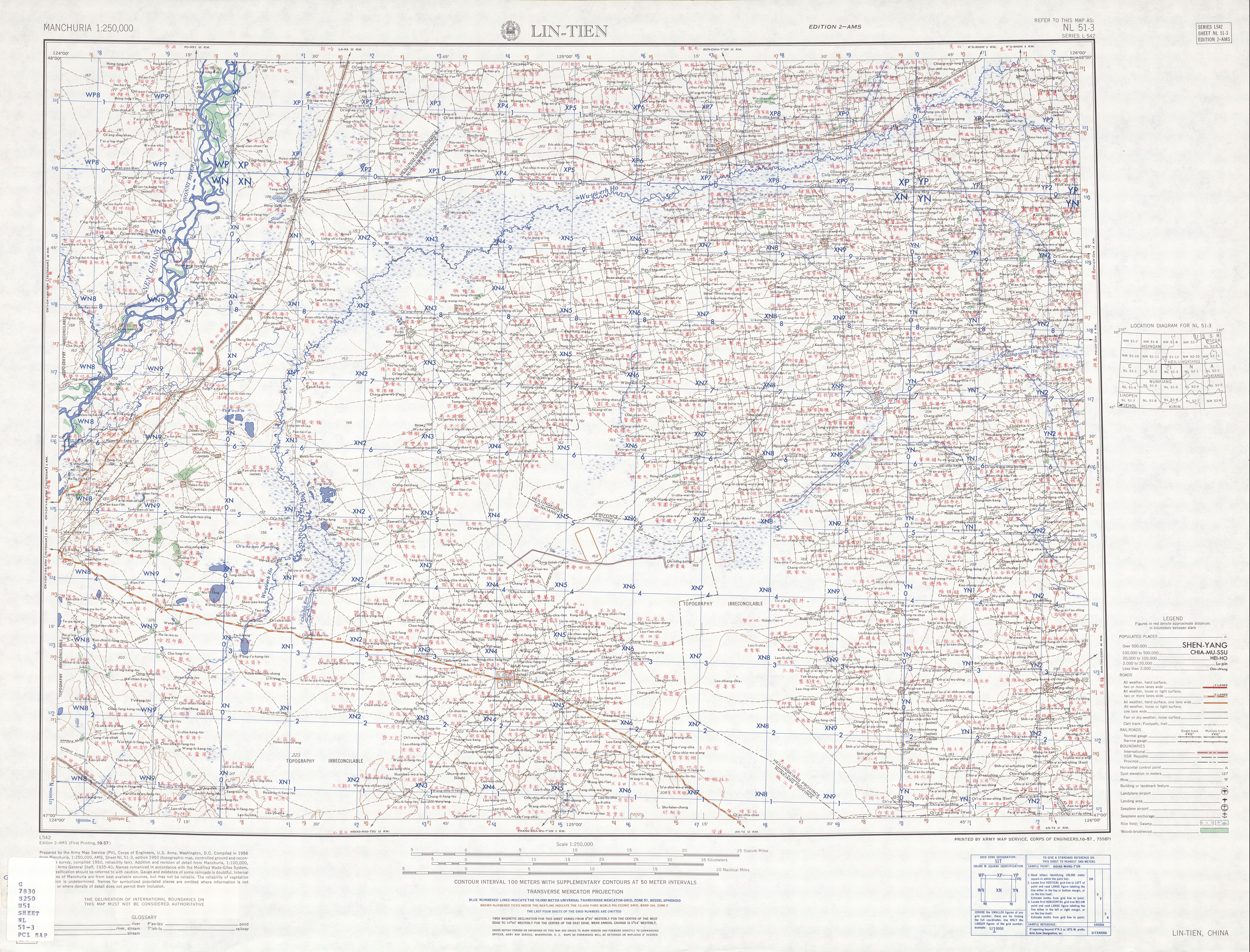
Map including Lindian (labeled as 林甸 Lin-tien (walled)) (AMS, 1956)

Geographically, Lindian county is located form 124°18'E to 125°21'E and 46°44'N to 47°29'N with a total area of 3746 square kilometers including 1160 square kilometers cultivated land.

The county has a total and agricultural population of 260,000 and 198,000, respectively. Ninety nine percent of the total population is Han people and peoples of eleven other ethnic groups such as Mongolian, Hui, Manchu and Korean are living mixed with them. The natural growth rate of its population is below 0.41 percent.

Lying on the alluvial plain of Songhua-Nen rivers and with the Wuyuer River and Shuangyang River flowing across its land, Lindian County possesses 210 square kilometers of water surface and 2100 square kilometers of wetland. It covers part of Zhalong Nature Reserve, which is listed in the World Important Wetland Contents in 1992 by the United Nations, and also owns Xiaoheishan Natural Reserve. In the reserve regions are dwelling 13 different types of cranes including the rare red-crowned crane and 181 other water birds such as swans, wild goose, white storks and mandarin ducks.

Lindian is establishing its name for its rich geothermal resources. Beneath the entire country territory stores 180,000 million cubic meters of heat water with temperature ranging from forty degrees Celsius to ninety degrees Celsius. It is named the Town of Hot Springs of China in September 2004 by China Mining Association.

The County also enjoys a good public infrastructure. There are national highways, independent electrical supplies, fiber and cable networks, and financial and commercial services among other facilities.

As for the Town of Lindian, the total area is 148 square kilometers and the total population is 52,378 (see the note below).

== Administrative divisions ==
Lindian County is divided into 5 towns and 3 townships.

5 towns

- Lindian (林甸镇), Hongqi (红旗镇), Huayuan (花园镇), Sijiqing (四季青镇), Heminghu (鹤鸣湖镇)

3 townships

- Dongxing (东兴乡), Hongwei (宏伟乡), Sihe (四合乡)

== Climate ==
Climate data for Lindian, elevation 155 m (509 ft), (1991–2020 normals, extremes 1981–2010)
Month	Jan	Feb	Mar	Apr	May	Jun	Jul	Aug	Sep	Oct	Nov	Dec	Year
Record high °C (°F)	−1.5 (29.3)	8.8 (47.8)	20.6 (69.1)	31.3 (88.3)	35.8 (96.4)	39.7 (103.5)	38.4 (101.1)	36.3 (97.3)	33.7 (92.7)	26.4 (79.5)	15.3 (59.5)	6.9 (44.4)	39.7 (103.5)
Mean daily maximum °C (°F)	−13.1 (8.4)	−7.1 (19.2)	2.3 (36.1)	13.2 (55.8)	21.4 (70.5)	26.6 (79.9)	28.4 (83.1)	26.4 (79.5)	21.0 (69.8)	11.5 (52.7)	−1.4 (29.5)	−11.4 (11.5)	9.8 (49.7)
Daily mean °C (°F)	−18.6 (−1.5)	−13.5 (7.7)	−3.8 (25.2)	6.9 (44.4)	15.3 (59.5)	21.1 (70.0)	23.6 (74.5)	21.4 (70.5)	15.1 (59.2)	5.7 (42.3)	−6.6 (20.1)	−16.4 (2.5)	4.2 (39.5)
Mean daily minimum °C (°F)	−23.1 (−9.6)	−19.2 (−2.6)	−9.7 (14.5)	0.6 (33.1)	8.8 (47.8)	15.5 (59.9)	18.9 (66.0)	16.8 (62.2)	9.7 (49.5)	0.6 (33.1)	−10.9 (12.4)	−20.5 (−4.9)	−1.0 (30.1)
Record low °C (°F)	−37.6 (−35.7)	−35.2 (−31.4)	−26.1 (−15.0)	−11.6 (11.1)	−4.3 (24.3)	2.8 (37.0)	8.1 (46.6)	6.6 (43.9)	−4.4 (24.1)	−16.5 (2.3)	−27.3 (−17.1)	−33.8 (−28.8)	−37.6 (−35.7)
Average precipitation mm (inches)	2.5 (0.10)	2.9 (0.11)	6.9 (0.27)	20.0 (0.79)	33.7 (1.33)	81.8 (3.22)	136.2 (5.36)	97.9 (3.85)	49.0 (1.93)	19.0 (0.75)	4.7 (0.19)	4.7 (0.19)	459.3 (18.09)
Average precipitation days (≥ 0.1 mm)	4.1	2.6	4.1	5.4	8.6	12.2	12.9	11.9	8.4	5.1	4.1	5.2	84.6
Average snowy days	6.0	4.1	5.9	2.7	0.2	0	0	0	0.1	1.9	5.7	7.1	33.7
Average relative humidity (%)	70	63	50	46	48	61	72	75	65	58	62	70	62
Mean monthly sunshine hours	173.4	198.6	243.5	235.6	255.3	248.0	244.0	240.3	237.6	205.5	167.8	153.0	2,602.6
Percentage possible sunshine	62	68	66	58	55	52	51	55	64	62	61	58	59
Source: China Meteorological Administration
