= Xiachengzi railway station =

Railway station in Muling, China

Coordinates: 44.6688°N 130.4402°E

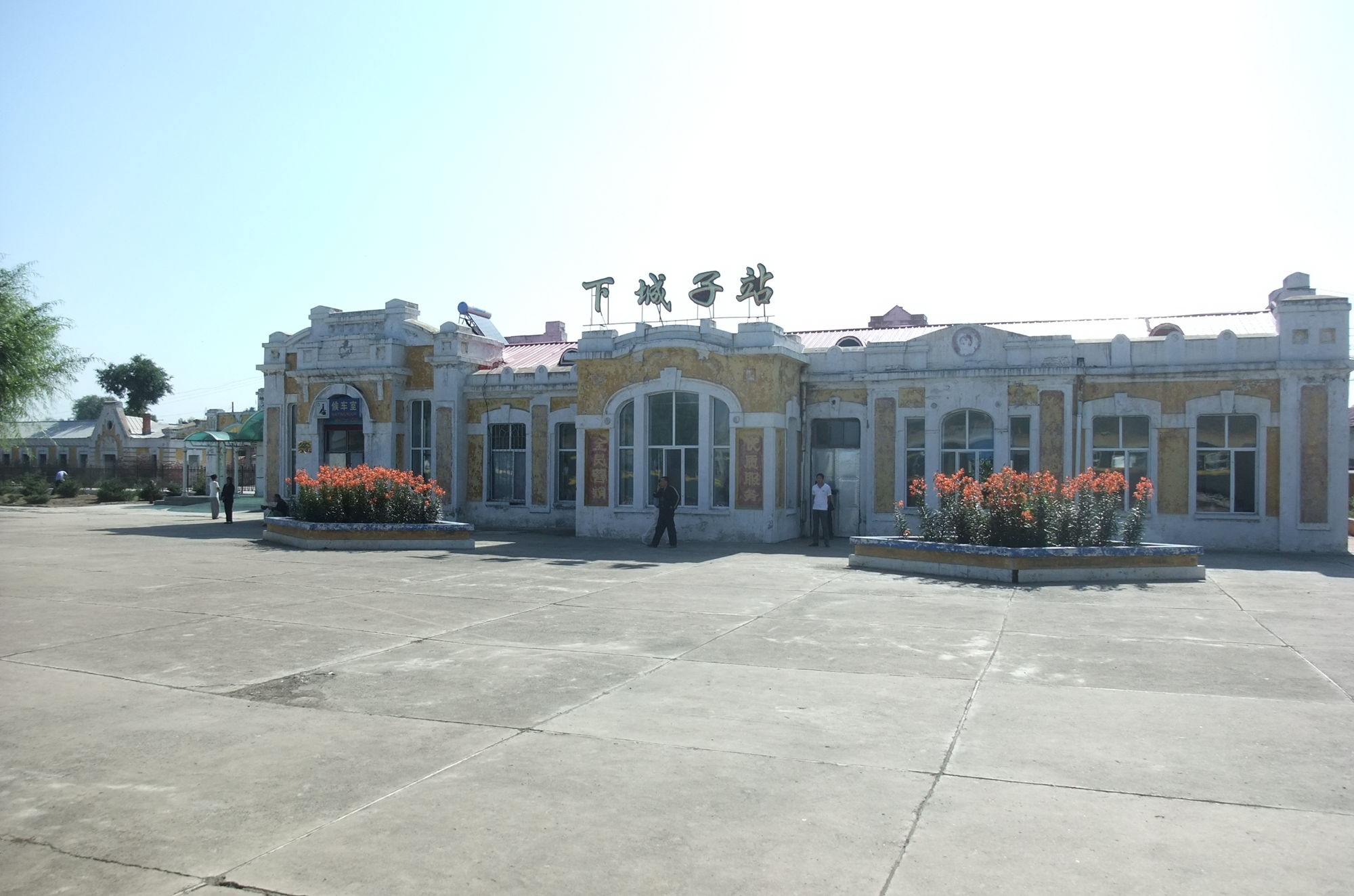
Station in 2009

Xiachengzi railway station (Chinese: 下城子站; pinyin: Xiàchéngzǐ Zhàn) is a railway station located in Xiachengzi town, Muling City, Heilongjiang province, People's Republic of China.

It is a station of Harbin–Suifenhe railway, 442 km to Harbin railway station and 106 km to Suifenhe railway station. It is also the starting station of Chengji railway, 107 km to the destination Jixi. Xiachengzi station was built in 1900 with original name Xiaochengzi station (Chinese: 小城子站; pinyin: Xiǎochéngzǐ Zhàn). Now it is a level-4 station under China Railway Harbin Group with 6 rails pass by.
