= Taiping Township, Mishan =

Taiping Township 太平乡
- Township
- Location in Heilongjiang Taiping Township (China)
- Coordinates: 45.3898°N 131.5528°E
- Country: People's Republic of China
- Province: Heilongjiang
- Prefecture-level city: Jixi
- County-level city: Mishan
- Time zone: UTC+8 (China Standard)

Taiping Township (simplified Chinese: 太平乡; traditional Chinese: 太平鄉; pinyin: Tàipíng Xiāng) is a township in Mishan, Jixi, Heilongjiang, China. As of 2020, it has eight villages under its administration:

- Taiping Village
- Qingsong Village (青松村)
- Nongfeng Village (农丰村)
- Minzhu Village (民主村)
- Honglin Village (宏林村)
- Zhuangnei Village (庄内村)
- Hexin Village (合心村)
- Zhuangxing Village (庄兴村)
