= Hongxing, Harbin =

Hongxing
- Town

Chinese transcription(s)
  - Chinese: 红星镇
- Location in Heilongjiang Hongxing (China)
- Coordinates: 45°33′57″N 127°6′43″E
- Country: China
- Province: Heilongjiang
- Prefecture: Harbin
- District: Acheng
- Elevation: 679 m (2,228 ft)
- Time zone: UTC+8 (China Standard Time)

Hongxing (Chinese: 红星镇) is a town situated in the Harbin prefecture of Heilongjiang, China. It is under the jurisdiction of Acheng District. It is located about 11 kilometres (6.8 mi) east of the town of Acheng and 64.7 kilometres (40.2 mi) southeast of Harbin. It contains the Hongxing Reservoir.

== Administrative divisions ==
The township-level division contains the following villages:

- Zhenxing Village (振兴村)
- Haixing Village (海兴村)
- Haidong Village (海东村)
- Cixing Village (慈兴村)
- Beizhao Village (北赵村)

== See also ==
- List of township-level divisions of Heilongjiang
