= Songzhan =

Town of Zhaodong

Coordinates: 46°13′34.8″N 125°37′15″E

- Traditional Chinese: 宋站鎮
- Simplified Chinese: 宋站镇
Transcriptions
Standard Mandarin
- Hanyu Pinyin: Sòngzhàn zhèn
Wu
- Romanization: son zae tsen
Yue: Cantonese
- Jyutping: sung3 zaam6 zan3

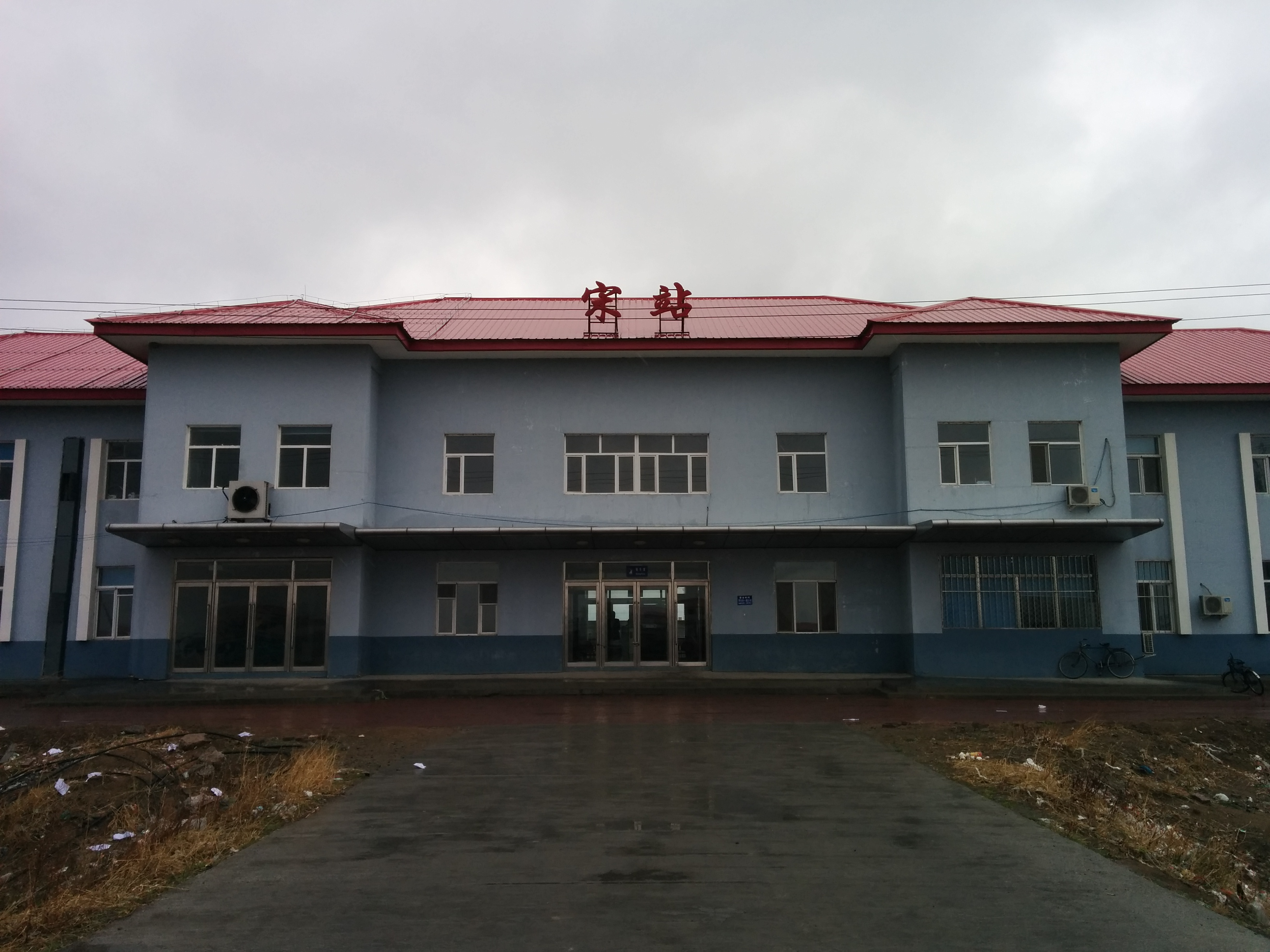
Song Railway Station, the original of the name of Songzhan

Songzhan is the town of Zhaodong, Suihua, Heilongjiang, China. It is located at the northwest of Zhaodong, away from Zhaodong city 30 km, and away from Harbin 90 km, away from Daqing 60 km. The area of Songzhan is 281 km^{2}. The town has eight administrate villages, 64 natural villages, and it has inhabitants 42,000. It has inhabitants 22,000 at the town city.

== Name ==
The name of Songzhan is meaning Song Railway Station. It is the shortest name of railway station in China, only the station with the one-character name. When the station built up, the command of construction team is with the last name of Song(宋), so called it Song station. After that, near the station it became a town, so it named Songzhan(lit. Song station).

== History ==
At Manchukuo, here existed the village. In 1945, it was the 7th Area of Zhaodong county. At spring of 1948, the 7th Area named Songzhan Area. In September 1951, it became Songzhan Town, under the 7th Area. In March 1956, the town be administrated directly by county. In September 1958, Xuanhua(宣化), Ruiguang(瑞光) were reconstructed with Songzhan and became Songzhan people's commune. In 1961, Xuanhua was restored. In March 1984, Songzhan restore the town.

== Economy ==
Songzhan is the commodity center of the north of Zhaodong, about four towns and five fields (Shangjia, Xuanhua, Anmin, Qinglong, Shiyan, Dongfeng, Sifangshan, Xianshe). It has a dairy industry that has been developed hundred years. The GDP of 2012 is 2.689 billion yuan, among this has 0.87 billion yuan comes from dairy industry.

== Sub-divisions ==
Songzhan has eight villages:

- Villages: Tiexi(铁西), Xiaoguang(晓光), Gongrong(共荣), Leye(乐业), Ruiguang(瑞光), Hesheng(合胜), Wanfa(万发), Songzhan(宋站)
