= Dongsheng Township, Anyue County =

Dongsheng Township 东胜乡
- Township
- Location in Sichuan
- Coordinates: 30°00′40″N 105°38′19″E
- Country: People's Republic of China
- Province: Sichuan
- Prefecture-level city: Ziyang
- County: Anyue

Area
  - Total: 28.6 km^{2} (11.0 sq mi)
- Elevation: 298 m (978 ft)

Population
  - Total: 15,000
  - Density: 520/km^{2} (1,400/sq mi)
- Time zone: UTC+8 (China Standard)
- Postal code: 641300
- Area code: 0832

Dongsheng Township (simplified Chinese: 东胜乡; traditional Chinese: 東勝鄉; pinyin: Dōngshèng Xiāng; lit. 'east victory') is a township of Anyue County in eastern Sichuan province, China, located around 9 kilometres (5.6 mi) west of the border with Chongqing Municipality and 29 km (18 mi) east of the county seat. It has a population of 15,000 residing in an area of 28.6 square kilometres (11.0 sq mi). As of 2011, it has 11 villages under its administration.

== See also ==
- List of township-level divisions of Sichuan
