= Taiping Township, Zhaodong =

Taiping Township 太平乡
- Township
- Location in Heilongjiang Taiping Township (China)
- Coordinates: 45°55′4″N 125°55′52″E
- Country: China
- Province: Heilongjiang
- Prefecture-level city: Suihua
- County-level city: Zhaodong
- Time zone: UTC+8 (China Standard)

Taiping Township (simplified Chinese: 太平乡; traditional Chinese: 太平鄉; pinyin: Tàipíng Xiāng) is a township in Zhaodong, Suihua, Heilongjiang, China. As of 2020, it has seven villages under its administration:

- Taiping Village
- Tonghe Village (同合村)
- Qinjian Village (勤俭村)
- Donghe Village (东合村)
- Qunli Village (群力村)
- Guangyuan Village (光远村)
- Qingfeng Village (庆丰村)
