= Toutai =

Toutai is a given name and surname. Notable people with the name include:

- Toutai Kefu (born 1974), Tongan-Australian professional rugby union player
- Vai Toutai (born 1993), Tongan rugby league player
