= Yulin, Lanxi County =

Yulin 榆林镇
- Town
- Location in Heilongjiang Yulin (China)
- Coordinates: 46°6′12″N 126°17′16″E
- Country: People's Republic of China
- Province: Heilongjiang
- Prefecture-level city: Suihua
- County: Lanxi County
- Time zone: UTC+8 (China Standard)

Yulin (Chinese: 榆林; pinyin: Yúlín) is a town under the administration of Lanxi County, Heilongjiang, China. As of 2018, it has 8 villages under its administration.
