= Taiping, Jixian County =

Taiping 太平镇
- Town
- Location in Heilongjiang Taiping (China)
- Coordinates: 46°45′37″N 130°41′49″E
- Country: People's Republic of China
- Province: Heilongjiang
- Prefecture-level city: Shuangyashan
- County: Jixian County
- Time zone: UTC+8 (China Standard)

Taiping (Chinese: 太平; pinyin: Tàipíng) is a town in Jixian County, Heilongjiang province, China. As of 2020, it administers Yongfa Residential Community (永发社区) and the following 17 villages:

- Taiping Village
- Taixing Village (太兴村)
- Taizeng Village (太增村)
- Taishan Village (太山村)
- Tai'an Village (太安村)
- Taihui Village (太辉村)
- Taihe Village (太合村)
- Taizhong Village (太忠村)
- Taiheng Village (太恒村)
- Taihong Village (太洪村)
- Taiyu Village (太玉村)
- Tailin Village (太林村)
- Taiyan Village (太岩村)
- Taiyang Village (太阳村)
- Taili Village (太利村)
- Tairong Village (太荣村)
- Taifa Village (太发村)
