= Guoshushifanchang =

Township-level division of Heilongjiang, China

Guŏshùshìfànchăng is a Township-like area in Jixian County which is under the jurisdiction of the prefecture-level city of Shuangyashan in Heilongjiang province of China. The population as of the 2010 census is 303.
