= Errenban Township =

Errenban Township 二人班乡
- Township
- Location in Heilongjiang Errenban Township (China)
- Coordinates: 45°17′39″N 131°42′9″E
- Country: People's Republic of China
- Province: Heilongjiang
- Prefecture-level city: Jixi
- County-level city: Mishan
- Time zone: UTC+8 (China Standard)

Errenban Township (simplified Chinese: 二人班乡; traditional Chinese: 二人班鄉; pinyin: Èrrénbān Xiāng) is a township under the administration of Mishan in Heilongjiang, China. As of 2018, it has 15 villages under its administration.
