= Dongsheng Township, Bei'an =

Township in Heilongjiang, China

Dongsheng Township 东胜乡
- Township
- Location in Heilongjiang Dongsheng Township (China)
- Coordinates: 48°14′15″N 126°40′22″E
- Country: People's Republic of China
- Province: Heilongjiang
- Prefecture-level city: Heihe
- County-level city: Bei'an
- Elevation: 261 m (856 ft)
- Time zone: UTC+8 (China Standard)

Dongsheng Township (simplified Chinese: 东胜乡; traditional Chinese: 東勝鄉; pinyin: Dōngshèng Xiāng; lit. 'east victory') is a township in west-central Heilongjiang province, China, located about 13 kilometres (8.1 mi) east of Bei'an, which administers it.As of 2011, it has 5 villages under its administration.

== See also ==
- List of township-level divisions of Heilongjiang
