= Xiangyang, Jidong County =

Xiangyang 向阳镇
- Town
- Location in Heilongjiang Xiangyang (China)
- Coordinates: 45°13′50″N 131°30′33″E
- Country: People's Republic of China
- Province: Heilongjiang
- Prefecture-level city: Jixi
- County: Jidong County
- Time zone: UTC+8 (China Standard)

Xiangyang (Chinese: 向阳) is a town of Jidong County, Heilongjiang, China. As of 2018, it has one residential community and 9 villages under its administration.
