= Nancha Town =

Nancha Town 南岔镇
- Town
- Location in Heilongjiang Dongsheng (China)
- Coordinates: 47°07′53″N 129°17′26″E
- Country: People's Republic of China
- Province: Heilongjiang
- Prefecture-level city: Yichun
- County: Nancha
- Elevation: 168 m (551 ft)
- Time zone: UTC+8 (China Standard)
- Postal code: 153100

Nancha Town (simplified Chinese: 南岔镇; traditional Chinese: 南岔鎮; pinyin: Nánchà Zhèn) is a town of central Nancha County, Yichun, Heilongjiang, China about 75 kilometres (47 miles) southwest of the city proper of Yichun. As of 2011, it has 6 residential communities (社区) under its administration.

Before 2016, the communities and villages administrated by Nancha Town belonged to the districts of Lianhe, Dongsheng, and Xishui. In 2016, Yichun government decided to cancel these districts, and administrate those areas directly by the then Nancha district. In June 2019, during the conversion of Nancha from district to county, Yichun decide to establish Nancha Town to administrate those areas.

== See also ==
- List of township-level divisions of Heilongjiang
