= Xiangyang Township, Zhaodong =

Xiangyang Township 向阳乡
- Township
- Location in Heilongjiang Xiangyang Township (China)
- Coordinates: 46°1′13″N 125°44′28″E
- Country: People's Republic of China
- Province: Heilongjiang
- Prefecture-level city: Suihua
- County-level city: Zhaodong
- Time zone: UTC+8 (China Standard)

Xiangyang Township (simplified Chinese: 向阳乡; traditional Chinese: 向陽鄉; pinyin: Xiàngyáng Xiāng) is a township under the administration of Zhaodong, Heilongjiang, China. As of 2018, it has 9 villages under its administration.
