= Yingshan County, Sichuan =

Coordinates: 31°04′27″N 106°33′58″E

Yingshan County 营山县
- County
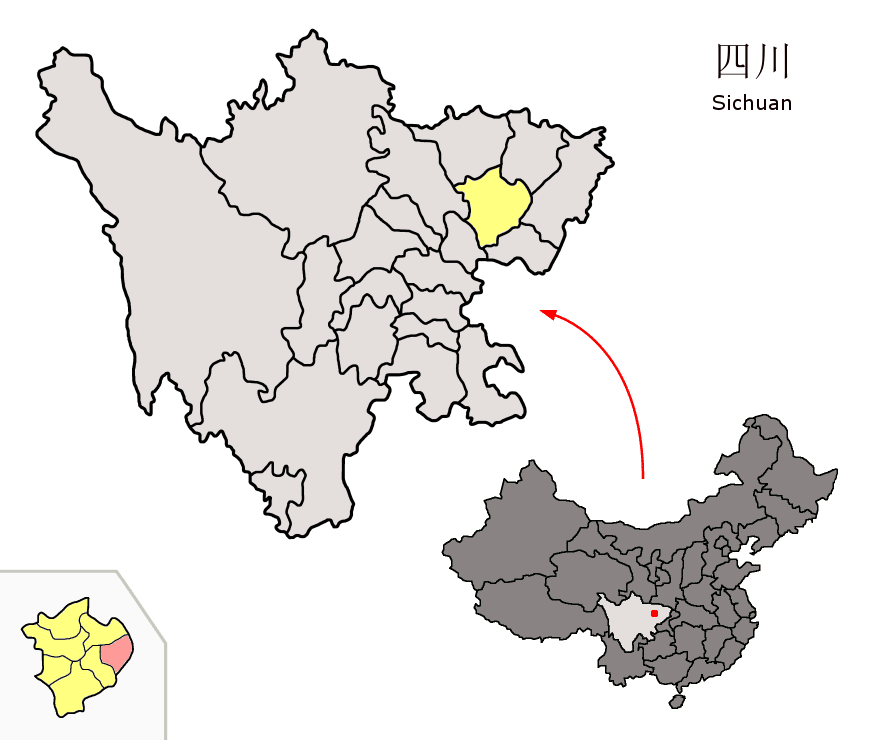
- Location of Yingshan County (red) within Nanchong City (yellow) and Sichuan
- Country: China
- Province: Sichuan
- Prefecture-level city: Nanchong

Area
  - Total: 1,633 km^{2} (631 sq mi)

Population (2020 census)
  - Total: 620,480
  - Density: 380.0/km^{2} (984.1/sq mi)
- Time zone: UTC+8 (China Standard)

Yingshan County (simplified Chinese: 营山县; traditional Chinese: 營山縣; pinyin: Yíngshān Xiàn) is a county in the northeast of Sichuan Province, China. It is the easternmost county-level division of the prefecture-level city of Nanchong.

== Administrative divisions ==
Yingshan County comprises 3 subdistricts, 18 towns and 8 townships:

subdistricts

- Sui'an 绥安街道
- Langchi 朗池街道
- Chengnan 城南街道

towns

- Lujing 渌井镇
- Dongsheng 东升镇
- Luoshi 骆市镇
- Huangdu 黄渡镇
- Xiaoqiao 小桥镇
- Lingjiu 灵鹫镇
- Laolin 老林镇
- Muya 木垭镇
- Xiaoshui 消水镇
- Shuangliu 双流镇
- Lüshui 绿水镇
- Liaoye 蓼叶镇
- Xindian 新店镇
- Huilong 回龙镇
- Xinghuo 星火镇
- Xiqiao 西桥镇
- Wanglonghu 望龙湖镇
- Qingshan 青山镇

townships

- Muding 木顶乡
- Mingde 明德乡
- Taipeng 太蓬乡
- Bailin 柏林乡
- Yuezhong 悦中乡
- Damiao 大庙乡
- Anhua 安化乡
- Qingshui 清水乡

== Climate ==
Climate data for Yingshan, elevation 406 m (1,332 ft), (1991–2020 normals, extremes 1981–present)
Month	Jan	Feb	Mar	Apr	May	Jun	Jul	Aug	Sep	Oct	Nov	Dec	Year
Record high °C (°F)	19.8 (67.6)	23.2 (73.8)	32.7 (90.9)	35.5 (95.9)	36.6 (97.9)	37.2 (99.0)	40.6 (105.1)	42.8 (109.0)	40.1 (104.2)	33.9 (93.0)	25.2 (77.4)	18.1 (64.6)	42.8 (109.0)
Mean daily maximum °C (°F)	9.4 (48.9)	12.5 (54.5)	17.6 (63.7)	23.3 (73.9)	27.0 (80.6)	29.4 (84.9)	32.4 (90.3)	32.7 (90.9)	27.3 (81.1)	21.4 (70.5)	16.4 (61.5)	10.5 (50.9)	21.7 (71.0)
Daily mean °C (°F)	6.3 (43.3)	8.8 (47.8)	13.1 (55.6)	18.3 (64.9)	22.1 (71.8)	24.9 (76.8)	27.8 (82.0)	27.6 (81.7)	23.1 (73.6)	17.8 (64.0)	12.9 (55.2)	7.7 (45.9)	17.5 (63.6)
Mean daily minimum °C (°F)	4.0 (39.2)	6.2 (43.2)	9.8 (49.6)	14.5 (58.1)	18.4 (65.1)	21.6 (70.9)	24.3 (75.7)	23.9 (75.0)	20.3 (68.5)	15.5 (59.9)	10.6 (51.1)	5.6 (42.1)	14.6 (58.2)
Record low °C (°F)	−2.9 (26.8)	−2.0 (28.4)	−0.4 (31.3)	4.4 (39.9)	9.3 (48.7)	14.3 (57.7)	16.9 (62.4)	16.8 (62.2)	12.6 (54.7)	2.8 (37.0)	1.4 (34.5)	−4.0 (24.8)	−4.0 (24.8)
Average precipitation mm (inches)	14.1 (0.56)	16.8 (0.66)	39.1 (1.54)	78.6 (3.09)	120.6 (4.75)	162.3 (6.39)	176.4 (6.94)	155.2 (6.11)	132.2 (5.20)	95.0 (3.74)	40.5 (1.59)	17.3 (0.68)	1,048.1 (41.25)
Average precipitation days (≥ 0.1 mm)	9.0	8.0	10.5	12.0	13.4	14.0	12.9	11.3	12.9	14.7	10.5	9.3	138.5
Average snowy days	1.0	0.4	0	0	0	0	0	0	0	0	0	0.3	1.7
Average relative humidity (%)	85	81	76	75	75	79	78	75	81	86	86	86	80
Mean monthly sunshine hours	41.7	51.6	96.4	131.6	141.0	132.0	178.3	191.0	105.6	74.4	60.5	38.4	1,242.5
Percentage possible sunshine	13	16	26	34	33	31	42	47	29	21	19	12	27
Source: China Meteorological Administrationall-time extreme temperatureall-time July high
