= Sanhe =

Sanhe may also refer to these places in China:

- Sanhe, Hebei (三河市), a county-level city of Hebei

== Subdistricts ==
- Sanhe Subdistrict, Fengdu County (三合街道), in Fengdu County, Chongqing
- Sanhe Subdistrict, Sandu County (三合街道), in Sandu Shui Autonomous County, Guizhou
- Sanhe Subdistrict, Chengdu (三河街道), in Xindu District, Chengdu, Sichuan

== Towns ==
- Sanhe, Feixi County (三河), in Feixi County, Anhui
- Sanhe, Fuyang (三合), in Fuyang, Anhui
- Sanhe, Huainan (三和), in Huainan, Anhui
- Sanhe, Bishan District (三合), in Bishan District, Chongqing
- Sanhe, Shizhu County (三河), in Shizhu Tujia Autonomous County, Chongqing
- Sanhe, Hezheng County (三合), in Hezheng County, Gansu
- Sanhe, Longnan (三河), in Longnan, Gansu
- Sanhe, Dabu County (三河), in Dabu County, Guangdong
- Sanhe, Taishan (三合), in Taishan, Guangdong
- Sanhe, Guangxi (三合), in Pubei County, Guangxi
- Sanhe, Bozhou District (三合), in Bozhou District, Zunyi, Guizhou
- Sanhe, Renhuai (三合), in Renhuai, Zunyi, Guizhou
- Sanhe, Heilongjiang (三河), in Suihua, Heilongjiang
- Sanhe, Hubei (三合), in Yingcheng, Hubei
- Sanhe, Jiangsu (三河), in Huai'an, Jiangsu
- Sanhe, Longjing (三合), in Longjing, Jilin
- Sanhe, Ningxia (三河), in Haiyuan County, Ningxia
- Sanhe, Qinghai (三合), in Haidong, Qinghai
- Sanhe, Shaanxi (三合), in Chenggu County, Shaanxi
- Sanhe, Jiangyou (三合), in Jiangyou, Sichuan
- Sanhe, Jianyang (三合), in Jianyang, Sichuan
- Sanhe, Yilong County (三河), in Yilong County, Sichuan
- Sanhe, Zhejiang (三合), in Tiantai County, Zhejiang
- Sanhe, Yanling (三河), a town in Yanling County, Hunan, merged into Xiayang Town in 2015

== Townships ==
- Sanhe Township, Gansu (三合乡), in Jingning County, Gansu
- Sanhe Hui Ethnic Township (三河回族乡), in Ergun, Inner Mongolia
- Sanhe Township, Baicheng (三合乡), in Baicheng, Jilin
- Sanhe Manchu and Korean Ethnic Township (三合满族朝鲜族乡), in Dongfeng County, Jilin
- Sanhe Township, Kangding (三合乡), in Kangding, Sichuan
- Sanhe Township, Tongjiang County (三合乡), in Tongjiang County, Sichuan
- Sanhe Township, Xuanhan County (三河乡), in Xuanhan County, Sichuan
- Heminghu, a town in Lindian County, Heilongjiang, known as Sanhe Township before 2015
- Niubeishan, a town in Yingjing County, Sichuan, known as Sanhe Township before 2017

== Villages ==
- Sanhe, in Sanhe, Hubei

== Historical regions ==
- Sanhe (三河), a collective term for Henan, Hedong and Henei regions in ancient China

== See also ==
- Sanhe Junior High School metro station, a metro station of the Taipei Metro
- Shanhe (disambiguation)
