= Yanghe =

Yanghe may refer to several locations in China:

== Areas ==
- Yanghe Mountains (陽和山), former name of Yangming Mountains, mountain range in Hunan
- Yanghe Subdistrict (阳和街道), in Yufeng District, Liuzhou, Guangxi
- Yanghe (阳和), former territory, today part of Northwest Yanggao County in Shanxi (今山西阳高西北)

== Towns ==
- Yanghe, Guangdong (杨和), in Gaoming District, Foshan, Guangdong
- Yanghe, Henan (洋河), a town in Xinyang, Henan
- Yanghe, Hubei (杨河), in Yingcheng, Hubei
- Yanghe, Liaoning (洋河), in Xiuyan Manchu Autonomous County, Liaoning
- Yanghe, Yongning County (杨和), in Yongning County, Ningxia
- Yanghe, Shandong (洋河), a village in Jiaozhou, Shandong

== Townships ==
- Yanghe Township, Gansu (杨河乡), in Zhuanglang County, Gansu
- Yanghe Tujia Ethnic Township (阳和土家族乡), in Cili County, Hunan
- Yanghe Township, Ningxia (杨河乡), in Longde County, Ningxia
- Yanghe Township, Sichuan (杨河乡), in Ebian Yi Autonomous County, Sichuan

== Other uses ==
- Yanghe (洋河), a variety of the Chinese alcoholic beverage Baijiu
- Yanghe Stadium, a stadium in Chongqing, China

== See also ==
- Yang He (born 1990), Chinese footballer
- Yang River (disambiguation)
- Yanhe (disambiguation)
