= Shanhe =

Shanhe (Chinese: 山河) may refer to these places in China:

- Shanhe Subdistrict, a subdistrict of Shuangyang District, Changchun, Jilin
- Shanhe Township, a township of Longde County, Ningxia

== Towns ==
- Shanhe, Gansu, in Zhengning County, Gansu
- Shanhe, Heilongjiang, in Wuchang, Heilongjiang
- Shanhe, Shanxi, in Zezhou County, Shanxi

== See also ==
- Sanhe (disambiguation)
