= 1718 Tongwei–Gansu earthquake =

Earthquake in the Qing dynasty

- Location within Gansu Location within China
- Local date: June 19, 1718
- Magnitude: 7.5 M_{s} 7.5 M_{w}
- Epicenter: 35.0°N 105.2°E
- Areas affected: Qing dynasty
- Max. intensity: MMI X (Extreme)
- Landslides: >300
- Foreshocks: Yes
- Casualties: ≈73,000 dead

An earthquake occurred on June 19, 1718, in Tongwei County, Gansu Province, Qing dynasty, present-day China. The estimated surface wave magnitude (M_{s}) 7.5 earthquake was designated a maximum Modified Mercalli intensity of X (Extreme), causing tremendous damage and killing 73,000 people.

== Tectonic setting ==
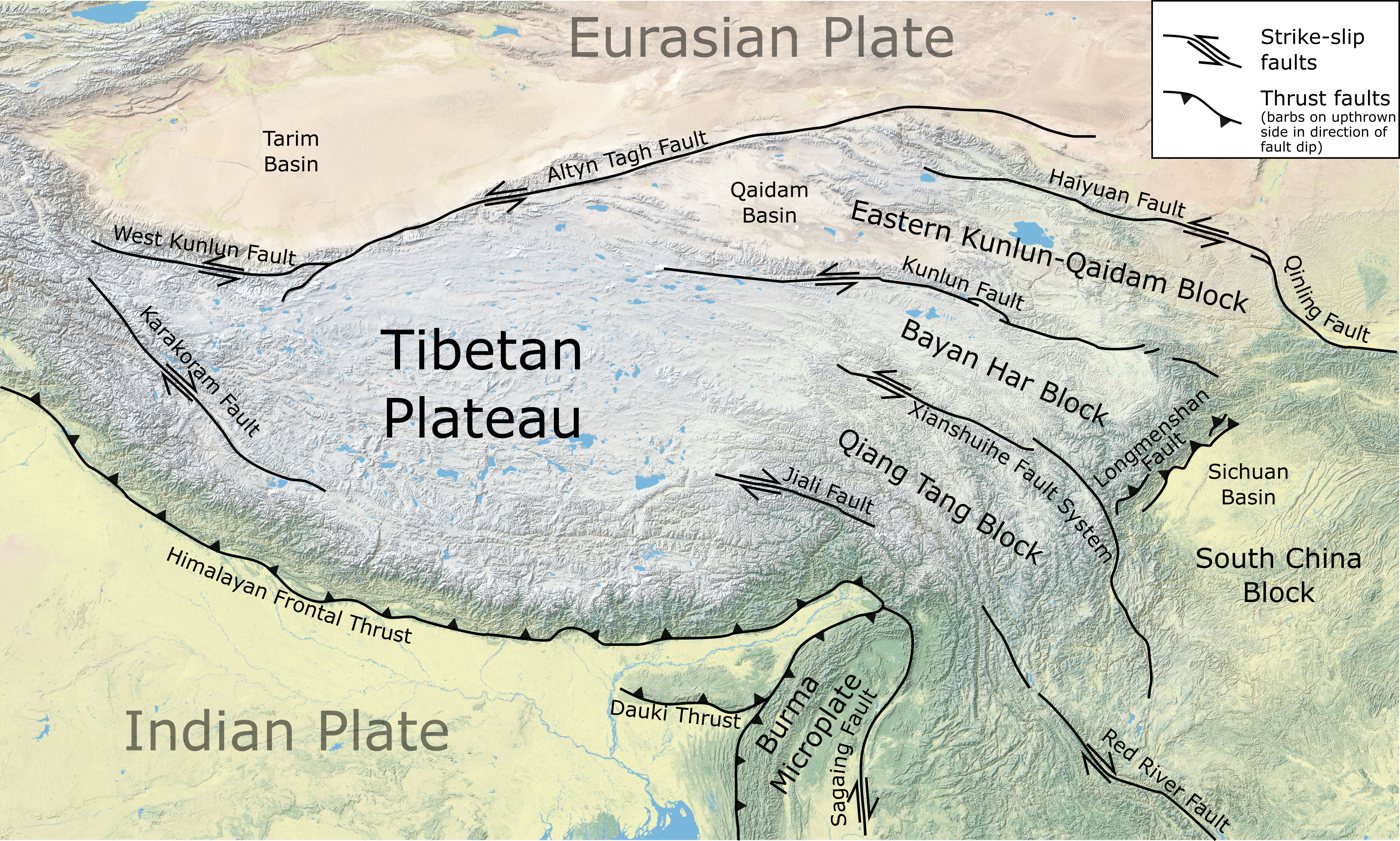
A map of the India-Asia deformation zone with active faults in the region

The active plate tectonics of Gansu Province located on the Tibetan Plateau is dominated by the north–south continental collision of the Indian Plate and Eurasian Plate. As the Indian Plate collides along a convergent plate boundary known as the Main Himalayan Thrust, it being of continental crust does not subduct: rather, it ploughs into the Eurasian Plate. This process severely deforms the Eurasian Plate, uplifting the crust, forming the Tibetan Plateau. The force of the Indian Plate converging pushes the Tibetan Plateau east, towards the Sichuan Basin, forming another zone of collision. This collision and resulting crustal deformation of the Eurasian Plate is accommodated by the Xianshuihe fault system, Haiyuan Fault, Kunlun Fault, Altyn Tagh fault, and Longmenshan Fault. The presence of active faults in Gansu makes the region vulnerable to damaging earthquakes. The very deadly 2008 Sichuan earthquake occurred due to a thrust fault rupture on the Longmenshan Fault. The 1920 Haiyuan and 1927 Gulang earthquakes occurred due to ruptures along the Haiyuan Fault.

== Earthquake ==
One possible source of the earthquake is the West Qinling Fault, a 600 km (370 mi) long, left–lateral strike-slip fault. The fault has not produced a major earthquake since at least the 1718 earthquake. Estimates of its slip rate vary from 0.71 to 2.9 mm (0.028 to 0.114 in) per year since the Pleistocene according to field surveys, whereas geodetic information yielded no greater than 1 mm (0.039 in) yer year.

Another proposed source is the Tongwei Fault, a Holocene thrust fault, located north of the West Qinling Fault. This was based on the distribution of earthquake-triggered landslides. Thousands of landslides were inferred by a survey to occur within a 50 by 60 km (31 by 37 mi) zone. A high concentration of landslides occurred within 15 km (9.3 mi) of the fault. At least 3,600 landslides accounted for more than 70% of the total number of landslides reported in this dense zone. No surface ruptures from the earthquake has been documented, suggesting it may be a buried rupture earthquake.

== Effects ==
The earthquake gained notable scientific attention due to the triggering of over 300 large landslides. Many of these slides consisted of several meters of loess and mudstone deposits along steep mountainsides near the Wei River. Three of the largest landslides in Pan'an, Tianshui, Gangu County, had a combined volume of 6.06 × 10^{8} m^{3}. Locating the distribution of landslides using Google Earth found a dense concentration of occurrence along the Tongwei Fault.

== Damage ==
All structures including government offices, schools, temples, and homes in Nanxiang were destroyed. It was reported that the only surviving structure was a portion of the brick city wall at the northeast corner of the city. Over 40,000 people were killed in the city. Another 30,000 people died in Yongning when massive landslides buried many homes in the area. Ground effects were severe; large fissures appeared and the landscape was deformed. A large landslide completely buried Yongning Ancient Town during the quake.

Several mountain peaks including one at Jingning County detached and fell, damming a river, and killing several thousand. In Zhuanglang County, a large hill suffered a landslide, resulting in thousands of deaths. Many gate towers, pavilions, and battlements in Qin'an County were destroyed.

In Tianshui, the earthquake collapsed Confucian Temples and homes. Ground fissures and landslides killed some residents. Smaller fatality figures were reported in other parts of Gansu Province. The earthquake also affected Shaanxi and Henan provinces.

== See also ==
- List of earthquakes in China
- List of historical earthquakes
