= Luo (surname) =

Luo or Lo refers to the Mandarin romanizations of the Chinese surnames 羅 (Simplified Chinese: 罗, pinyin: Luó, Jyutping: Lo4) and 駱 (Simplified Chinese: 骆, pinyin: Luò, Jyutping: Lok3). Of the two surnames, wikt:罗 is much more common among Chinese people. According to the Cantonese pronunciation, it can also refer to 盧.

In Cantonese, 罗/羅 is usually romanized as Lo and Law. In Teochew, 罗/羅 is most commonly transliterated as Low while in the Hokkien dialect it is romanized as Loke. In North Korea, 羅 is transcribed as 라 (Ra) and South Korea is transcribed as 나 (Na). In Vietnam, the name 羅 is pronounced La.

It is the 75th name on the Hundred Family Surnames poem.

== Origins ==
The origin of the Luo surname dates back to descendants of Luo, a feudal state which existed during the Shang dynasty to the Warring States period (modern day Hubei).

== Distribution ==
In 2019 it was the 20th most common surname in Mainland China.

Of the top 30 cities in China, 罗/羅 ranked eighth most common in Guiyang, ninth most common in Chongqing and Chengdu, and tenth most common in Changsha.

== Prominent people ==
=== 羅 ===
- La Hối (1920–1945), Vietnamese musician of Chinese heritage
- Andrew Lo, a professor at the MIT Sloan School of Management
- Lo Chen-Jung (born 1961), a retired Taiwanese left-handed baseball pitcher
- Lo Chi Kwan (born 1981), a Hong Kong international football (soccer) player
- Luo Yunxi (born 1988), a Chinese actor
- Chia-Jen Lo (born 1986), a Taiwanese right-handed baseball pitcher for the Houston Astros
- Lo Chih-an (born 1988), a Taiwanese football (soccer) player, twin brother of Lo Chih-en, from the aborigine Atayal tribe of Taiwan
- Lo Chih-chiang (born 1970), Deputy Secretary-General to the President of the Republic of China (2012–2013)
- Lo Chih-en (born 1988), a Taiwanese football (soccer) player, twin brother of Lo Chih-an, from the aborigine Atayal tribe of Taiwan
- Luo Shih-feng (English name Daniel Luo; born 1968), a Taiwanese singer
- Dennis Law Sau-Yiu, Hong Kong film producer, screenwriter and director
- Lo Elgan (1901–1997), Chinese Academy of Social Sciences researcher
- Gallen Lo, a Hong Kong actor and singer who primarily acts in television series
- Low Kim Swee, Lions Club International, District Governor of District 201 V5, 2024-2025
- Luo Gan, retired Chinese politician
- Luo Guanzhong, Chinese writer who lived during the Yuan and Ming periods
- Luo Yigang (born 1975), Chinese badminton player
- Him Law, Hong Kong film and television actor
- Lo Hoi-sing (1949–2010), a Hong Kong businessman, born in a Hong Kong communist family
- Lo Hsiang-lin (1906–1978), one of the most renowned researchers in Hakka language and culture
- Jerry Lo (DJ Jerry, born 1972), a singer and songwriter, popular in Taiwan in the 1990s
- Justin Lo, a singer-songwriter, actor and record producer working in Hong Kong
- Leyan Lo (born 1985), held the world record of 11.13 seconds for the fastest Rubik's Cube solution
- Law Kar-ying, Hong Kong actor, originally a Cantonese Opera artist
- Lo Kuo-Chong (born 1965), a retired Taiwanese professional baseball player, now a baseball coach
- Kuo Hui Lo (born 1985), a Taiwanese baseball player in the Seattle Mariners organization
- Law Kwok-tai, football coach and former Republic of China (Taiwan) international footballer from Hong Kong
- Law Lan, Hong Kong actress
- Lo Lieh (1939–2002), a Hong Kong actor in martial-arts films
- Lo Mang (born 1956), a Hong Kong–based veteran martial artist
- Luo Meizhen (1885?–2013), claimant for the world's oldest person
- Nathan Law (born 1993), Hong Kong student activist, politician and member of the Legislative Council in Hong Kong
- Luo Ronghuan, Chinese communist military leader
- Luo Shiwen, Chinese communist from Sichuan
- Luo Ying-shay, Minister of Justice of the Republic of China (2013–2016)
- Luo Jin, Chinese actor and singer
- Show Lo, Taiwanese actor, singer, and host
- Steven Lo (born 1959), a Hong Kong and Macanese businessman active in the entertainment world
- Lo Ta-yu, Taiwanese singer and songwriter
- Teddy Lo, a Hong Kong–based LED artist known for his work in the "tech-art" scene
- Lo Tsung-lo (1898–1978), a notable Chinese botanist and plant physiologist
- Victor Lo, GBS, OBE, JP (born 1950), the chairman and chief executive of Gold Peak Industries, Ltd. (Holdings)
- (La) Vicky La (born 1994), prominent policymaker
- Vincent Lo (born 1948), the chairman of Hong Kong–based Shui On Group, a building-materials and construction firm
- Lo Wei (1918–1996), a Hong Kong film director and film actor, launched both Bruce Lee and Jackie Chan
- Law Wing-Cheong, Hong Kong film editor, an assistant director, film director, and actor
- Xianglin Luo (Lo Hsiang Lin), Renowned researchers in Hakka language and culture
- Lo Hsing Han (1935–2013), Burmese business tycoon
- Na Yoon-Sun (born 1969), South Korean jazz singer
- Bonnie Loo (Luo Meiyi 罗美仪; born 1994), Singaporean singer and actress
- Yuen Tze Lo (1920–2002), electrical engineer and professor emeritus at University of Illinois at Urbana–Champaign
- Loh Kean Yew (born 1997), Singaporean badminton player
- Luo Yanlin (罗彦林), Gansu school teacher who was executed for sexually assaulting and raping 39 girls
- Luo Yunxi (English name Leo Luo; born 1988), Chinese actor and singer

=== Unknown ===
- Bernard Lo, a TV anchor and host on Bloomberg TV Asia
- Beth Lo (born 1949), an American artist
- Eileen Yin-Fei Lo (1937–2022), educator, chef and author of eleven cookbooks on Chinese cuisine
- Jason Lo, a Malaysian music artist, music producer, DJ and entrepreneur
- Lo Hsiao-Ting (born 1982), a Taiwanese softball player
- Lo Wing-lok JP (1954–2015), a Hong Kong doctor and politician
- Lormong Lo, the first Hmong American to be appointed to a city council in the U.S., in 1994
- Martin Lo, a spacecraft trajectory expert currently working for JPL
- Ricky Lo, entertainment writer, showbiz commentator and host of Chinese descent in the Philippines
