= Zhiping =

Zhiping may refer to:

== Locations in China ==
- Zhiping, Gansu (治平镇), Jingning County, Gansu
- Zhiping Town, Chongqing (支坪镇), Jiangjin District, Chongqing
- Zhiping Township, Chongqing (治平乡), Chengkou County, Chongqing
- Zhiping She Ethnic Township (治平畲族乡), Ninghua County, Fujian

== Historical eras ==
- Zhiping (治平, 1064–1067), era name used by Emperor Yingzong of Song
- Zhiping (治平, 1351–1355), era name used by Xu Shouhui
