= Wenbu =

Wenbu 温堡乡
- Township
- Interactive map of Wenbu
- Coordinates: 35.46°N 105.97°E
- Country: China
- Province: Ningxia
- Prefecture-level city: Guyuan
- County: Longde

Area
  - Total: 82 km^{2} (32 sq mi)
- Highest elevation: 2,400 m (7,900 ft)
- Lowest elevation: 1,740 m (5,710 ft)

Population
  - Total: 21,000

Wenbu is a township of Longde County, Ningxia, People's Republic of China. It is an exclave of Ningxia in Gansu. In 2014 it had a population of 21,000 making it the most populous township of Longde. The town administers 15 administrative villages and 72 villager groups, with the townhall being located in Dubu village (杜堡).

Its history as a township goes back to May 1956, when Taoshan township of Jingning County was placed under Longde County; in August, Wenbu township of Zhuanglang County was placed under Longde County. In October 1958, several communes were established in the present location, which were later renamed Taoshan Commune and Wenbu Commune. In 1984, the communes were changed to township. In October 2003, Taoshan township was abolished and merged into Wenbu township.

In 1958, Ningxia was split off from Gansu province, causing the township to become an exclave of Ningxia. Originally Wenbu was connected to the rest of Longde by a narrow corridor, but this was abolished when the final boundaries were demarcated.

Wenbu is known for sculpting, being the hometown of sculptor Yang Qihe (杨栖鹤).
