= Longde County =

Longde: 隆德县 (Chinese); ﻟْﻮدْ ثِيًا (Chinese); Lungteh
- County
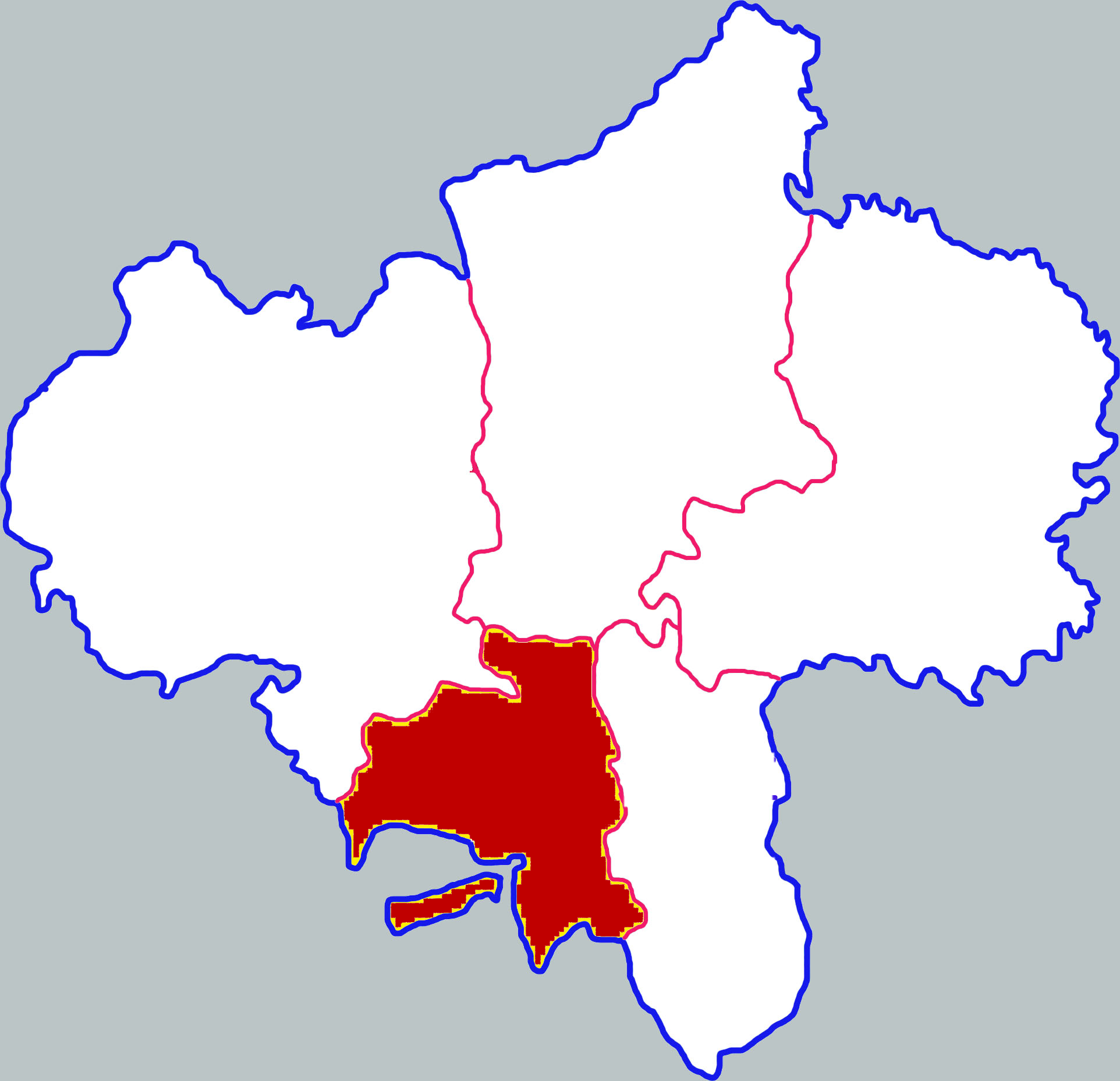
- Longde in Guyuan

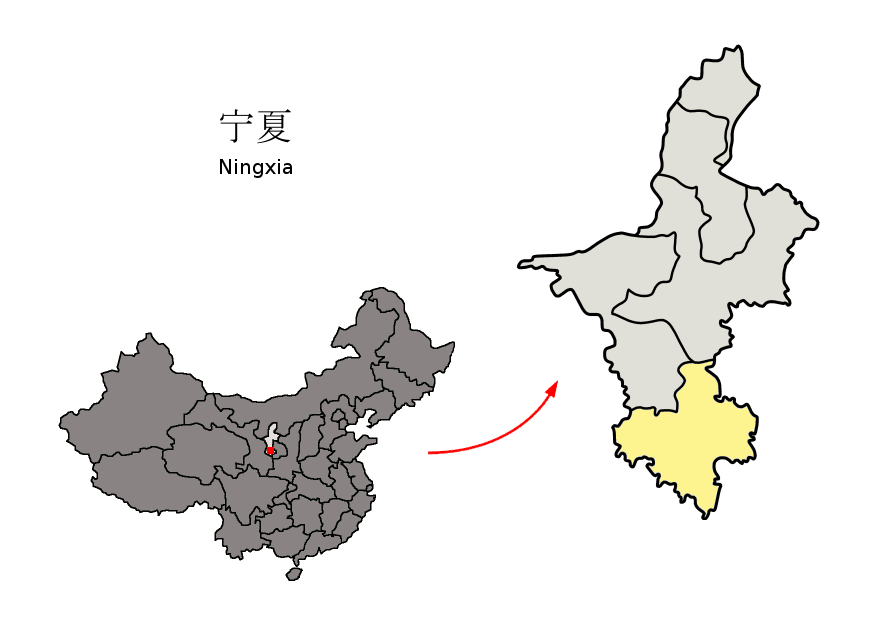
- Guyuan in Ningxia
- Coordinates: 35°37′33″N 106°06′42″E
- Country: China
- Autonomous region: Ningxia
- Prefecture-level city: Guyuan
- County seat: Chengguan

Area
  - Total: 992.21 km^{2} (383.09 sq mi)

Population
  - Total: 160,754
  - Density: 162.02/km^{2} (419.62/sq mi)
- Time zone: UTC+8 (China Standard)

Longde County (simplified Chinese: 隆德县; traditional Chinese: 隆德縣; pinyin: Lóngdé Xiàn, Xiao'erjing: ﻟْﻮدْ ثِيًا) is a county under the administration of the prefecture-level city of Guyuan in the south of Ningxia Hui Autonomous Region of China.

Longde County is located in the southern part of Ningxia. It gets its name from the town of Long and the Deshun army. Historically, the county was under the control of Pingliang city in Gansu province. To the north of the county is Guyuan, to the east is Jingyuan County, to the south is Zhuanglang County, and to the west is Jingning County.

Although Longde County is in the southern part of Ningxia, air temperature is usually lower than the surrounding areas, because Longde is, on average, 2000 meters above sea level. In addition, because the county is located in the northern foothills of the Liupan mountain range, there is relatively little water. The water that is added is commonly lost to earth flows, so agriculture in the county is poorly developed. These factors, coupled with the gangs of bandits who historically roamed the region, made Longde a county famous for its impoverishment.

There are many mountains in Longde County. The highest peak in the Liupan range rises 2900 meters above sea level. The range became famous when Chinese Communist Party leader Mao Zedong wrote a poem with the phrase "On the summit of Liupan, the red flag waves freely in the western wind". This mountain has some stretches of verdant forest, unlike the treeless hills of the surrounding Loess Plateau. During the 1960s, the mountain was still the haunt of panthers, wolves, and other predators. On the hilltop, there is a memorial pavilion for the Long March of the Red Army, a television relay tower, a meteorology station, and other things. The Liupan Public Highway stretches for more than 5000 meters, tunneling through the hillside. Before the tunnel was open to traffic, the Liupan range was a natural moat dividing the highway between Xi'an and Lanzhou. The road twists and winds, an exceptional and imposing sight. During the heavy snow of winter, cars often flip over because of the road's difficult conditions.

Because the Liupan range, which is over 200 kilometers long in total, is in the southeast part of Longde, and the county is generally high above sea level in the east and lower in the west, river water is said to flow backwards here. There are not many rivers in the county, but major ones include the Yu River and the Hulu River. There are also a number of sizable reservoirs and natural ponds (known locally as "Flooded Dams").

Since the county is on the periphery of the Loess Plateau, there are many mountains and ravines. Flat land is called "Chuan". It is generally quite fertile and yields a plentiful variety of products. The mountains have many terrace fields.

Large numbers of Han Chinese and Hui people live in the county. The local dialect of Chinese is similar to that spoken in Shaanxi, but slightly different. It is rather different from that spoken in the northern part of Ningxia. Farmers grow wheat, potatoes, corn, soy beans, and peas, among other things. They also raise cattle like cows, sheep, and pigs. Products produced in the county include apples, pears, apricots, watermelons, and traditional Chinese medicine. Local folk traditions are similar to those in surrounding Gansu and Shaanxi. Important holidays often include popular celebration activities. For example, the Spring Festival includes a "Juggling Group Fire" activity. There are also some customs not often seen in other places in China. For example, "singed rickets" during the first month of the lunar new year, sauteed peas on the second day of February, hanging picked sallow outside one's door on the fifth of May, giving winter clothes to one's ancestors on October 1, and others.

Because there is little space and many people in some mountainous areas, the environment has been seriously destroyed, and the areas are no longer suitable for living. In recent years, the local government has successively organized residents to move to the plains areas in northern Ningxia. Resettlement is known locally as "Hanging condolences on the village farm". There are also many rural young people who leave the county to find work opportunities in China's coastal regions.

== Transport ==
- China National Highway 312

== Administrative divisions ==
Longde County administers 3 towns and 10 townships.

3 towns

- Chengguan (城关镇, چٍْ‌قُوًا جٍ)
- Liancai (联财镇, لِيًاڞَيْ جٍ)
- Shatang (沙塘镇, شَاتَانْ جٍ)

10 townships

- Shanhe (山河乡)
- Fengling (凤岭乡, فٍْ‌لِئٍ ثِيَانْ)
- Zhangcheng (张程乡, جَانْ‌چٍْ ثِيَانْ)
- Shenlin (神林乡, شٍ‌لٍ ثِيَانْ)
- Yanghe (杨河乡, يَانْ‌حَ ثِيَانْ)
- Guanzhuang (观庄乡, قُوًاجُوَانْ ثِيَانْ)
- Haoshui (好水乡, خَوْشُوِ ثِيَانْ)
- Chenjin (陈靳乡, چٍ‌ڭٍ ثِيَانْ)
- Dian'an (奠安乡, دِيًااً ثِيَانْ)
- Wenbu (温堡乡, وٌبُ ثِيَانْ)

== Climate ==
Climate data for Longde, elevation 2,079 m (6,821 ft), (1991–2020 normals, extremes 1981–2010)
Month	Jan	Feb	Mar	Apr	May	Jun	Jul	Aug	Sep	Oct	Nov	Dec	Year
Record high °C (°F)	12.0 (53.6)	16.9 (62.4)	22.4 (72.3)	26.2 (79.2)	28.0 (82.4)	29.7 (85.5)	32.4 (90.3)	30.6 (87.1)	29.1 (84.4)	21.8 (71.2)	16.2 (61.2)	10.9 (51.6)	32.4 (90.3)
Mean daily maximum °C (°F)	−0.8 (30.6)	2.4 (36.3)	7.8 (46.0)	14.0 (57.2)	18.0 (64.4)	21.4 (70.5)	23.2 (73.8)	22.2 (72.0)	17.4 (63.3)	11.8 (53.2)	6.2 (43.2)	0.9 (33.6)	12.0 (53.7)
Daily mean °C (°F)	−7.3 (18.9)	−3.8 (25.2)	1.5 (34.7)	7.6 (45.7)	11.9 (53.4)	15.7 (60.3)	17.7 (63.9)	16.7 (62.1)	12.2 (54.0)	6.2 (43.2)	0.1 (32.2)	−5.6 (21.9)	6.1 (43.0)
Mean daily minimum °C (°F)	−12.3 (9.9)	−8.6 (16.5)	−3.3 (26.1)	1.7 (35.1)	5.7 (42.3)	9.6 (49.3)	12.4 (54.3)	12.0 (53.6)	8.0 (46.4)	1.9 (35.4)	−4.4 (24.1)	−10.4 (13.3)	1.0 (33.9)
Record low °C (°F)	−25.5 (−13.9)	−23.6 (−10.5)	−19.5 (−3.1)	−13.4 (7.9)	−7.4 (18.7)	−0.4 (31.3)	3.0 (37.4)	3.7 (38.7)	−1.9 (28.6)	−11.5 (11.3)	−19.1 (−2.4)	−27.3 (−17.1)	−27.3 (−17.1)
Average precipitation mm (inches)	5.7 (0.22)	6.8 (0.27)	12.1 (0.48)	28.7 (1.13)	45.9 (1.81)	75.9 (2.99)	111.5 (4.39)	104.0 (4.09)	69.6 (2.74)	39.4 (1.55)	10.5 (0.41)	3.1 (0.12)	513.2 (20.2)
Average precipitation days (≥ 0.1 mm)	6.2	6.0	7.4	7.9	10.1	12.6	14.7	13.3	12.5	10.4	5.9	3.9	110.9
Average snowy days	9.3	8.5	7.8	2.7	0.5	0	0	0	0.1	2.4	5.1	5.7	42.1
Average relative humidity (%)	61	60	56	54	57	65	71	73	75	72	66	60	64
Mean monthly sunshine hours	176.9	164.4	197.4	218.1	234.6	229.5	225.1	209.6	158.5	172.7	171.5	180.3	2,338.6
Percentage possible sunshine	57	53	53	55	54	53	51	51	43	50	56	60	53
Source: China Meteorological Administration

== Related literary works ==
In Zhang Henshui's short story Returning For Yan, the female main character Yang Yanqiu is from Jingning County, in Gansu, but grew up in Longde and sees it as her home. The book depicts the drought of 1928-1929 in Gansu and Shaanxi, when people in the region lived in dire poverty. They were forced to survive on grass and tree bark, without any way to eat boiled food. One of Yang Yanqiu's family members has already gone east to escape the poverty, and she sells herself to save her parents. Another family member has disappeared. Later, Yang Yanqiu follows her parents to Nanjing, but returns to Longde after her father's death to find her family members. She also must do some work for northwestern development. Thus she is "Returning for Yan".
