= Yanhe =

Yanhe may refer to:

== Places in China ==
- Yanhe Tujia Autonomous County, a county in Guizhou
- Yanhe Subdistrict (研和街道), a subdistrict in Hongta District, Yuxi, Yunnan

=== Towns ===
- Yanhe, Heilongjiang (延河), a town in Yanshou County, Heilongjiang
- Yanhe, Huai'an (盐河), a town in Huai'an, Jiangsu
- Yanhe, Jianhu County (沿河), a town in Jianhu County, Jiangsu

=== Townships ===
- Yanhe Township, Chongqing (沿河乡), a township in Chengkou County, Chongqing
- Yanhe Township, Sichuan (沿河乡), a township in Dazhou, Sichuan

== Historical eras ==
- Yanhe (延和, 432–435), era name used by Emperor Taiwu of Northern Wei
- Yanhe (延和, 712), era name used by Emperor Ruizong of Tang

== Others ==
- Yanhe (software) (言和), a Chinese virtual signer

== See also ==
- Yanghe (disambiguation)
