= Leyan =

Leyan or Le Yan is a given name. Notable people with the name include:

- Leyan Lo (born 1985), American speedcuber
- Chloe Wang Le Yan, better known as Chloe Wang (born 1986), Taiwanese actress, singer and host
