= Dian'an =

Coordinates: 35°26′59″N 106°07′32″E

Dian'an 奠安乡
- Township
- Interactive map of Dian'an
- Country: China
- Region: Ningxia
- Prefecture: Guyuan
- County: Longde

Area
  - Total: 71.18 km^{2} (27.48 sq mi)
- Highest elevation: 2,400 m (7,900 ft)
- Lowest elevation: 1,500 m (4,900 ft)

Population (2014)
  - Total: 6,000

Dian'an is a township of Longde County, Ningxia, People's Republic of China. In 2014 it had a population of 6,000. The township has jurisdiction over 10 administrative villages and 48 villager groups, with the townhall being located in Jiujie village (旧街村).

Didian was originally part of Jingning County, Gansu. In May 1956, Dian'an was incorporated into Longde County. In October 1958, the name was changed to Qianfeng Commune, but renamed to Dian'an Commune in April 1959. In January 1984, the commune was changed into a township. Xueyang Village of Dian'an is an exclave of Ningxia in Gansu province, which was formed when Ningxia was split off Gansu.
