= Jiang Hongwei =

Chinese politician (born 1968)

- 姜宏伟

Deputy Secretary of the Heilongjiang Provincial Commission for Discipline Inspection
- In office October 2020 – June 2026

Deputy Director of the Heilongjiang Provincial Supervisory Commission
- In office October 2020 – June 2026

Personal details
- Born: January 1968 (age 58) Wuchang, Heilongjiang, China
- Party: Chinese Communist Party (1987-)
- Education: Heilongjiang University; Northeast Forestry University

Jiang Hongwei (Chinese: 姜宏伟; born January 1968) is a former Chinese politician, who was served as the deputy secretary of the Heilongjiang Provincial Commission for Discipline Inspection and the deputy director of the Heilongjiang Provincial Supervisory Commission from 2020 to 2026.

== Career ==
Jiang Hongwei was born in Wuchang, Heilongjiang. In 1985, he was enrolled to Chinese language major of Heilongjiang University. After graduating in 1989, he was enrolled to Heilongjiang Civil Aviation Administration. In 1990, he was transferred to Heilongjiang Forest Industry General Bureau, and served as serveal positions. In August 2012, he was appointed as the head of organization of Heilongjiang Forest Industry General Bureau.

In July 2015, Jiang was appointed as the secretary of the Daxing'anling Prefecture Commission for Discipline Inspection. In November 2017, he was appointed as the standing member of the CCP Jiamusi Municipal Committee, and the secretary of the Jiamusi Municipal Commission for Discipline Inspection. He also appointed as the director of the Jiamusi Municipal Supervisory Commission. In October 2020, he was appointed as the deputy secretary of the Heilongjiang Provincial Commission for Discipline Inspection and the deputy director of the Heilongjiang Provincial Supervisory Commission.

== Investigation ==
On 16 June 2026, Jiang was suspected of "serious violations of laws and regulations" by the Central Commission for Discipline Inspection (CCDI), the party's internal disciplinary body, and the National Supervisory Commission, the highest anti-corruption agency of China.
