= Chengzhong =

Chengzhong (城中) may refer to the following locations in the PRC:

- Chengzhong District, Liuzhou, Guangxi
- Chengzhong District, Xining, Qinghai
- Chengzhong, Ningming County, town in Guangxi

Subdistricts

- Chengzhong Subdistrict, Sihui, Guangdong
- Chengzhong Subdistrict, Liuzhou, in Chengzhong District, Liuzhou, Guangxi
- Chengzhong Subdistrict, Wuzhou, in Wanxiu District, Wuzhou, Guangxi
- Chengzhong Subdistrict, Yingcheng, in Yingcheng, Xiaogan, Hubei
- Chengzhong Subdistrict, Huaihua, in Hecheng District, Huaihua, Hunan
- Chengzhong Subdistrict, Taizhou, Jiangsu, in Hailing District, Taizhou, Jiangsu
- Chengzhong Subdistrict, Jinhua, in Wucheng District, Jinhua, Zhejiang
- Chengzhong Subdistrict, Yarkant County, Kashgar Prefecture, Xinjiang
