= Xudun =

Xudun or variation may refer to:

== Places ==
- Xudun, Jian'ou (Chinese: 徐墩镇), a town in Jian'ou, Fujian, China
- Xudun, Sanhe (Chinese: 徐墩村) a village in Sanhe, Hubei, China
- Xudun, Somalia, town in Xudun District, Sool Region, Somaliland
- Xudun District, Sool Region, Somaliland

== Other uses ==
- Xu Dun (許惇), a person of the Northern Qi; see Book of Northern Qi

== See also ==
- The dictionary definition of 徐墩 at Wiktionary
- Dunxu, Tibet, China
- Xu (disambiguation)
- Dun (disambiguation)
