= Yongning, Zhuanglang County =

Yongning 永宁镇
- Town
- Location in Gansu
- Coordinates: 35°18′10″N 106°9′54″E
- Country: People's Republic of China
- Province: Gansu
- Prefecture-level city: Pingliang
- County: Zhuanglang County
- Time zone: UTC+8 (China Standard)

Yongning (simplified Chinese: 永宁; traditional Chinese: 永寧; pinyin: Yǒngníng) is a town under the administration of Zhuanglang County, Gansu, China. As of 2018, it has 16 villages under its administration.
