= Xiangyang, Wuchang, Heilongjiang =

Xiangyang 向阳镇
- Town
- Location in Heilongjiang
- Coordinates: 44.6264°N 127.4349°E
- Country: People's Republic of China
- Province: Heilongjiang
- Prefecture-level city: Harbin
- County-level city: Wuchang
- Time zone: UTC+8 (China Standard)

Xiangyang (Chinese: 向阳) is a town of Wuchang, Harbin, Heilongjiang, China. As of 2018, it has 17 villages under its administration.
