= Hezheng County =

Hezheng County 和政县
- County
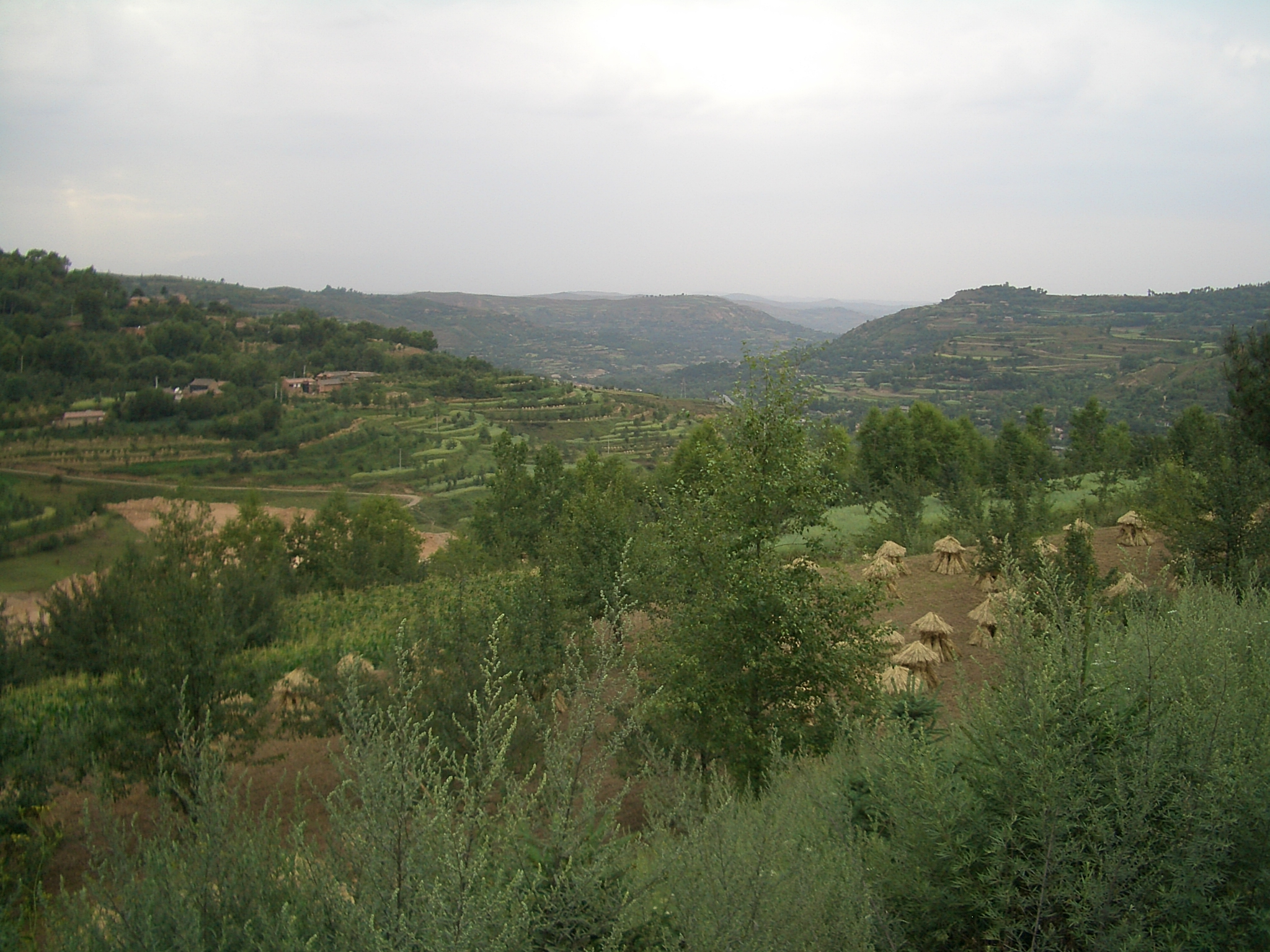
- Rural landscape in Hezheng County

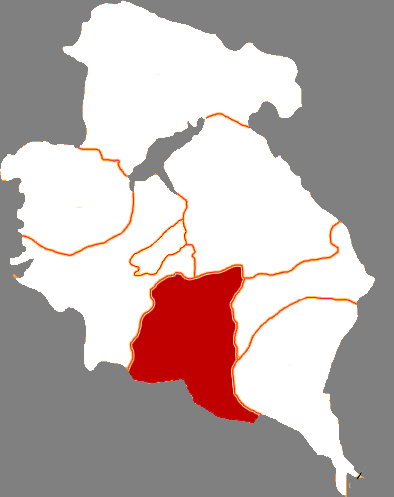
- Hezheng in Linxia

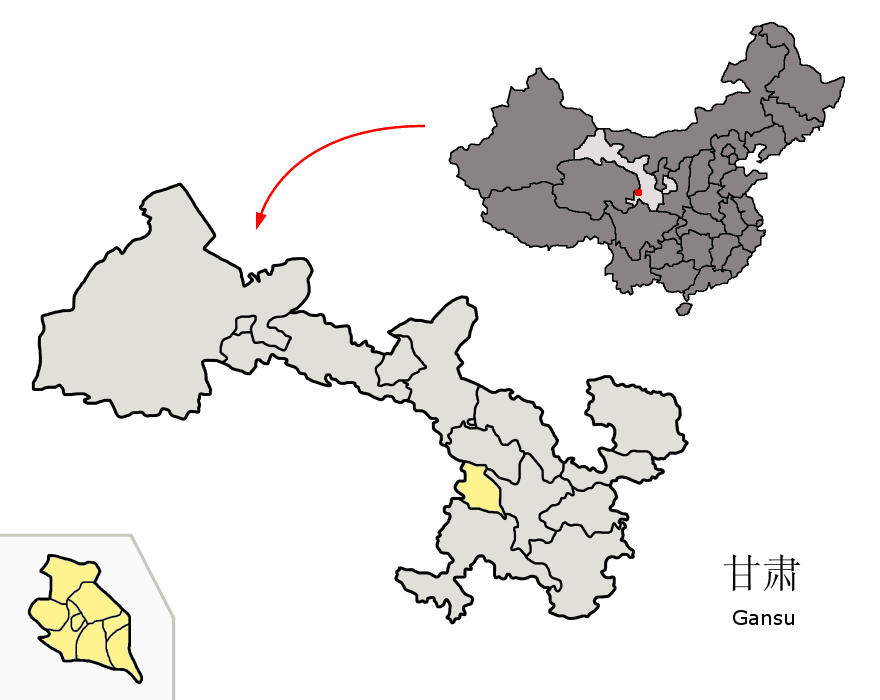
- Linxia in Gansu

- Location in Gansu Location in China
- Coordinates (Hezheng government): 35°25′29″N 103°21′04″E
- Country: China
- Province: Gansu
- Autonomous prefecture: Linxia
- County seat: Chengguan

Area
  - Total: 960 km^{2} (370 sq mi)

Population (2020)
  - Total: 204,529
  - Density: 210/km^{2} (550/sq mi)
- Time zone: UTC+8 (China Standard)
- Postal code: 731200
- Website: www.hezheng.gov.cn

Hezheng County (simplified Chinese: 和政县; traditional Chinese: 和政縣; pinyin: Hézhèng Xiàn; Wade–Giles: Ho-cheng Hsien) is a county in the Linxia Hui Autonomous Prefecture, province of Gansu of the People's Republic of China.

Ethnic groups include Han, Hui, and Dongxiang.

== Administrative divisions ==
Hezheng County is divided to 8 towns and 4 townships.

Towns

- Chengguan (城关镇)
- Sanhe (三合镇)
- Sanshilipu (三十里铺镇)
- Maijiaji (马家堡镇)
- Songming (松鸣镇)
- Chenjiaji (陈家集镇)
- Luojiaji (罗家集镇)
- Xinying (新营镇)

Townships

- Liangjiasi Township (水泉乡)
- Bujiazhuang Township (官坊乡)
- Xinzhuang Township (水泉乡)
- Dalang Township (官坊乡)

== Climate ==
Climate data for Hezheng, elevation 2,163 m (7,096 ft), (1991–2020 normals, extremes 1981–2010)
Month	Jan	Feb	Mar	Apr	May	Jun	Jul	Aug	Sep	Oct	Nov	Dec	Year
Record high °C (°F)	14.2 (57.6)	18.3 (64.9)	26.2 (79.2)	29.4 (84.9)	29.6 (85.3)	30.2 (86.4)	35.1 (95.2)	32.2 (90.0)	29.6 (85.3)	23.4 (74.1)	18.2 (64.8)	12.5 (54.5)	35.1 (95.2)
Mean daily maximum °C (°F)	0.6 (33.1)	4.2 (39.6)	9.6 (49.3)	15.8 (60.4)	19.2 (66.6)	22.2 (72.0)	24.2 (75.6)	23.3 (73.9)	18.4 (65.1)	13.2 (55.8)	7.7 (45.9)	2.3 (36.1)	13.4 (56.1)
Daily mean °C (°F)	−7.3 (18.9)	−3.4 (25.9)	2.3 (36.1)	8.0 (46.4)	11.9 (53.4)	15.2 (59.4)	17.1 (62.8)	16.5 (61.7)	12.3 (54.1)	6.6 (43.9)	0.0 (32.0)	−5.7 (21.7)	6.1 (43.0)
Mean daily minimum °C (°F)	−13.0 (8.6)	−9.0 (15.8)	−3.2 (26.2)	1.4 (34.5)	5.3 (41.5)	8.7 (47.7)	10.9 (51.6)	11.1 (52.0)	7.8 (46.0)	2.1 (35.8)	−4.7 (23.5)	−11.0 (12.2)	0.5 (32.9)
Record low °C (°F)	−23.4 (−10.1)	−23.2 (−9.8)	−21.3 (−6.3)	−13.6 (7.5)	−5.1 (22.8)	−0.1 (31.8)	2.4 (36.3)	3.1 (37.6)	−2.3 (27.9)	−9.8 (14.4)	−21.5 (−6.7)	−27.7 (−17.9)	−27.7 (−17.9)
Average precipitation mm (inches)	5.4 (0.21)	8.6 (0.34)	18.5 (0.73)	40.8 (1.61)	78.6 (3.09)	74.8 (2.94)	115.3 (4.54)	129.2 (5.09)	89.3 (3.52)	44.6 (1.76)	9.0 (0.35)	3.0 (0.12)	617.1 (24.3)
Average precipitation days (≥ 0.1 mm)	5.8	6.0	8.8	9.2	12.4	14.0	14.8	15.0	15.1	11.3	5.0	3.4	120.8
Average snowy days	8.6	8.7	9.6	4.3	0.6	0	0	0	0	2.5	5.5	6.1	45.9
Average relative humidity (%)	63	63	63	60	66	72	76	78	82	80	72	65	70
Mean monthly sunshine hours	189.3	182.3	205.5	221.9	235.1	229.0	235.4	217.1	159.2	175.2	192.0	197.0	2,439
Percentage possible sunshine	60	59	55	56	54	53	54	53	43	51	63	65	56
Source: China Meteorological Administration
