= Sanhe Township, Gansu =

Sanhe Township 三合乡
- Township
- Location in Gansu
- Coordinates: 35°40′24″N 105°30′30″E
- Country: People's Republic of China
- Province: Gansu
- Prefecture-level city: Pingliang
- County: Jingning
- Village-level divisions: 12 villages
- Elevation: 1,872 m (6,142 ft)
- Time zone: UTC+8 (China Standard)
- Area code: 0933

Sanhe (Chinese: 三合; pinyin: Sānhé) is a township of Jingning County in eastern Gansu province, China, located about 26 kilometres (16 mi) northwest of the county seat and 5.5 km (3.4 mi) south and west of the border with Ningxia. As of 2018, it has 12 villages under its administration.

== See also ==
- List of township-level divisions of Gansu
