= Yanghe Township, Gansu =

Yanghe Township 杨河乡
- Township
- Location in Gansu
- Coordinates: 35°20′42″N 106°2′6″E
- Country: People's Republic of China
- Province: Gansu
- Prefecture-level city: Pingliang
- County: Zhuanglang County
- Time zone: UTC+8 (China Standard)

Yanghe Township (simplified Chinese: 杨河乡; traditional Chinese: 楊河鄉; pinyin: Yánghé Xiāng) is a township under the administration of Zhuanglang County, Gansu, China. As of 2018, it has 13 villages under its administration.
