= Leyan Lo =

American speedcuber (born 1985)

- Born: Leyan Andrew Lo; November 24, 1985 (age 40)
- Education: California Institute of Technology
- Known for: Former Rubik's Cube world record holder

Leyan Andrew Lo (born November 24, 1985) is an American speedcuber. He held the world record for the fastest single Rubik's Cube solve with a time of 11.13 seconds. The record stood from January 14, 2006 to August 6, 2006. The record was later surpassed by Toby Mao with a time of 10.48 at the U.S. Nationals held in San Francisco, California.

Lo appeared on The Tonight Show with Jay Leno, where he solved a Rubik's Cube in 18.9 seconds. He also held the world record for the fastest blindfolded Rubik’s Cube solve a total of seven times in both the single and average categories. His fastest time achieved was 1:28.82.

In addition to his competitive skills, Lo contributed to the speedcubing community by providing instructional content on his website. The site includes methods for solving the Rubik’s Cube for beginners, as well as techniques for speedcubing and blindfold cubing, complete with algorithms and diagrammatic explanations.

Lo earned a Bachelor of Science degree in Physics from the California Institute of Technology in June 2007. In 2011, he was selected to perform on the violin as part of the YouTube Symphony Orchestra.
