= Sanhe, Huainan =

Sanhe 三和镇
- Town
- Location in China
- Coordinates: 32°34′54″N 116°59′1″E
- Country: People's Republic of China
- Province: Anhui
- Prefecture-level city: Huainan
- District: Tianjia'an District
- Time zone: UTC+8 (China Standard)

Sanhe (Chinese: 三和; pinyin: Sānhé) is a town under the administration of Tianjia'an District, Huainan, Anhui, China. As of 2018, it has 4 residential communities and 13 villages under its administration.
