= Chengkou County =

Chengkou 城口县 Chengkow
- County
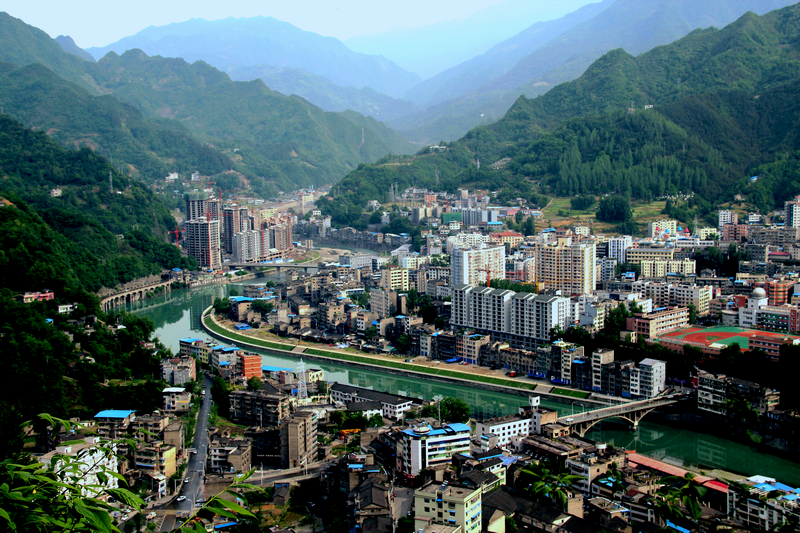
- Interactive map of Chengkou
- Country: People's Republic of China
- Municipality: Chongqing

Area
  - Total: 3,289.1 km^{2} (1,269.9 sq mi)

Population (2020)
  - Total: 197,497
  - Density: 60.046/km^{2} (155.52/sq mi)
- Time zone: UTC+8 (China Standard)

Chengkou County (Chinese: 城口县; pinyin: Chéngkǒu Xiàn) is a county in Chongqing municipality, China, and is the northernmost county-level division of Chongqing, bordering the provinces of Shaanxi and Sichuan to the north and west, respectively. To the northeast, the county borders Zhengping County, Pingli County, Langao County and Ziyang County of Ankang, Shaanxi. To the west, the county borders Wanyuan and Xuanhan County of Dazhou, Sichuan. To the south, the county borders Chongqing's Kaizhou District and Wuxi County.

The county is mountainous, covering most of the Daba Mountains in Chongqing municipality.

Local delicacies are bacon, tea, honey, and walnut oil.

== Administrative divisions ==
Chengkou County is composed of two subdistricts, ten towns, and thirteen townships. It formerly had 7 towns and 17 townships.

Two subdistricts (街道):

- Gecheng Subdistrict (葛城街道, before 2009 Gecheng Town (葛城镇)), Fuxing Subdistrict (复兴街道)

Ten towns (镇):

- Bashan (巴山镇), Pingba (坪坝镇), Miaoba (庙坝镇), Mingtong (明通镇), Xiuqi (修齐镇), Gaoguan (高观镇), Gaoyan (高燕镇, before 2012 Gaoyan Township (高燕乡)), Dong'an (东安镇, before 2014 Dong'an Township (东安乡)), Xianyi (咸宜镇, before 2014 Xianyi Township (咸宜乡)), Gaonan (高楠镇, before 2014 Gaonan Township (高楠乡))

Thirteen townships (乡):

- Longtian Township (龙田乡), Beiping Township (北屏乡), Zuolan Township (左岚乡), Yanhe Township (沿河乡), Shuanghe Township (双河乡), Liaozi Township (蓼子乡), Jiming Township (鸡鸣乡), Zhouxi Township (周溪乡), Mingzhong Township (明中乡), Zhiping Township (治平乡), Lantian Township (岚天乡), Houping Township (厚坪乡), Heyu Township (河鱼乡)

== Climate ==
Climate data for Chengkou, elevation 798 m (2,618 ft), (1991–2020 normals, extremes 1977–present)
Month	Jan	Feb	Mar	Apr	May	Jun	Jul	Aug	Sep	Oct	Nov	Dec	Year
Record high °C (°F)	23.2 (73.8)	27.7 (81.9)	33.9 (93.0)	35.3 (95.5)	37.7 (99.9)	40.0 (104.0)	38.5 (101.3)	39.5 (103.1)	39.3 (102.7)	33.0 (91.4)	26.4 (79.5)	21.0 (69.8)	40.0 (104.0)
Mean daily maximum °C (°F)	7.9 (46.2)	10.7 (51.3)	16.1 (61.0)	22.2 (72.0)	25.4 (77.7)	28.5 (83.3)	31.1 (88.0)	31.1 (88.0)	25.7 (78.3)	20.2 (68.4)	14.9 (58.8)	9.5 (49.1)	20.3 (68.5)
Daily mean °C (°F)	2.9 (37.2)	5.3 (41.5)	9.5 (49.1)	14.9 (58.8)	18.4 (65.1)	21.9 (71.4)	24.4 (75.9)	24.0 (75.2)	19.6 (67.3)	14.4 (57.9)	9.2 (48.6)	4.2 (39.6)	14.1 (57.3)
Mean daily minimum °C (°F)	−0.1 (31.8)	1.9 (35.4)	5.3 (41.5)	10.0 (50.0)	13.8 (56.8)	17.5 (63.5)	20.2 (68.4)	19.7 (67.5)	16.1 (61.0)	11.3 (52.3)	5.9 (42.6)	1.1 (34.0)	10.2 (50.4)
Record low °C (°F)	−13.2 (8.2)	−4.8 (23.4)	−5.0 (23.0)	−0.1 (31.8)	5.3 (41.5)	10.0 (50.0)	12.4 (54.3)	13.2 (55.8)	8.0 (46.4)	−1.6 (29.1)	−3.5 (25.7)	−12.3 (9.9)	−13.2 (8.2)
Average precipitation mm (inches)	17.6 (0.69)	25.4 (1.00)	58.4 (2.30)	84.0 (3.31)	146.9 (5.78)	173.3 (6.82)	220.0 (8.66)	164.9 (6.49)	169.6 (6.68)	119.9 (4.72)	47.0 (1.85)	18.6 (0.73)	1,245.6 (49.03)
Average precipitation days (≥ 0.1 mm)	9.4	9.3	12.6	13.3	14.6	15.3	15.8	14.5	14.2	14.1	11.0	9.2	153.3
Average snowy days	8.6	5.0	1.9	0.2	0	0	0	0	0	0	1.0	4.3	21
Average relative humidity (%)	78	76	73	74	77	79	81	80	83	84	82	80	79
Mean monthly sunshine hours	67.7	64.7	103.3	133.0	141.0	140.0	172.4	182.8	115.7	97.8	87.4	76.5	1,382.3
Percentage possible sunshine	21	21	28	34	33	33	40	45	32	28	28	25	31
Source: China Meteorological Administrationall-time extremes
