= Toby Mao =

American speedcuber (born 1988)

- Born: December 21, 1988 (age 37); Hillsborough, California, U.S.
- Education: Northwestern University
- Known for: Solving a Rubik's cube in 10.48 seconds

Tobias "Toby" Mao (born December 21, 1988) is a former world-class Rubik's Cube solver. Hailing from Hillsborough, California, Toby graduated from Crystal Springs Uplands School in 2007 and went on to study mathematics at Northwestern University in Evanston, Illinois. He is the younger brother of Beauty and the Geek second-season participant Tyson Mao, with whom he taught Will Smith to solve a Rubik's Cube for the 2006 film The Pursuit of Happyness. In 2006, Toby set the world record in speedcubing by solving the 3x3x3 cube in 10.48 seconds.
