= Sanhe, Jianyang =

Sanhe 三合镇
- Town
- Location in Sichuan
- Coordinates: 30°27′59″N 104°42′13″E
- Country: People's Republic of China
- Province: Sichuan
- Prefecture-level city: Chengdu
- County-level city: Jianyang
- Village-level divisions: 13 villages
- Elevation: 403 m (1,322 ft)
- Time zone: UTC+8 (China Standard)
- Area code: 0028

Sanhe (Chinese: 三合; pinyin: Sānhé) is a town under the administration of Jianyang City in eastern Sichuan province, China, located 16.5 kilometres (10.3 mi) northeast of downtown Jianyang as the crow flies. As of 2018, it has 13 villages under its administration.
