= Shanhe, Heilongjiang =

Shanhe 山河镇
- Town
- Location in Heilongjiang Shanhe (China)
- Coordinates: 44.7109°N 127.2126°E
- Country: People's Republic of China
- Province: Heilongjiang
- Prefecture-level city: Harbin
- County-level city: Wuchang
- Time zone: UTC+8 (China Standard)

Shanhe (Chinese: 山河; pinyin: Shānhé) is a town under the administration of Wuchang, Heilongjiang, China. As of 2018, it has 6 residential communities and 13 villages under its administration.
