= Sanhe, Fuyang =

Sanhe 三合镇
- Town
- Location in China
- Coordinates: 32°51′35″N 115°42′50″E
- Country: People's Republic of China
- Province: Anhui
- Prefecture-level city: Fuyang
- District: Yingzhou District
- Time zone: UTC+8 (China Standard)

Sanhe (Chinese: 三合; pinyin: Sānhé) is a town under the administration of Yingzhou District, Fuyang, Anhui, China. As of 2018, it has 2 residential communities and 6 villages under its administration.
