= Sanhe Township, Tongjiang County =

Sanhe Township 三合乡
- Township
- Location in Sichuan
- Coordinates: 31°49′20″N 107°19′58″E
- Country: People's Republic of China
- Province: Sichuan
- Prefecture-level city: Bazhong
- County: Tongjiang
- Village-level divisions: 8 villages
- Elevation: 774 m (2,539 ft)
- Time zone: UTC+8 (China Standard)
- Area code: 0827

Sanhe (Chinese: 三合; pinyin: Sānhé) is a township of Tongjiang County in northeastern Sichuan province, China, located 13 kilometres (8.1 mi) southeast of the county seat. As of 2018, it has eight villages under its administration.
