= Wuchang, Heilongjiang =

Wuchang 五常市
- County-level city
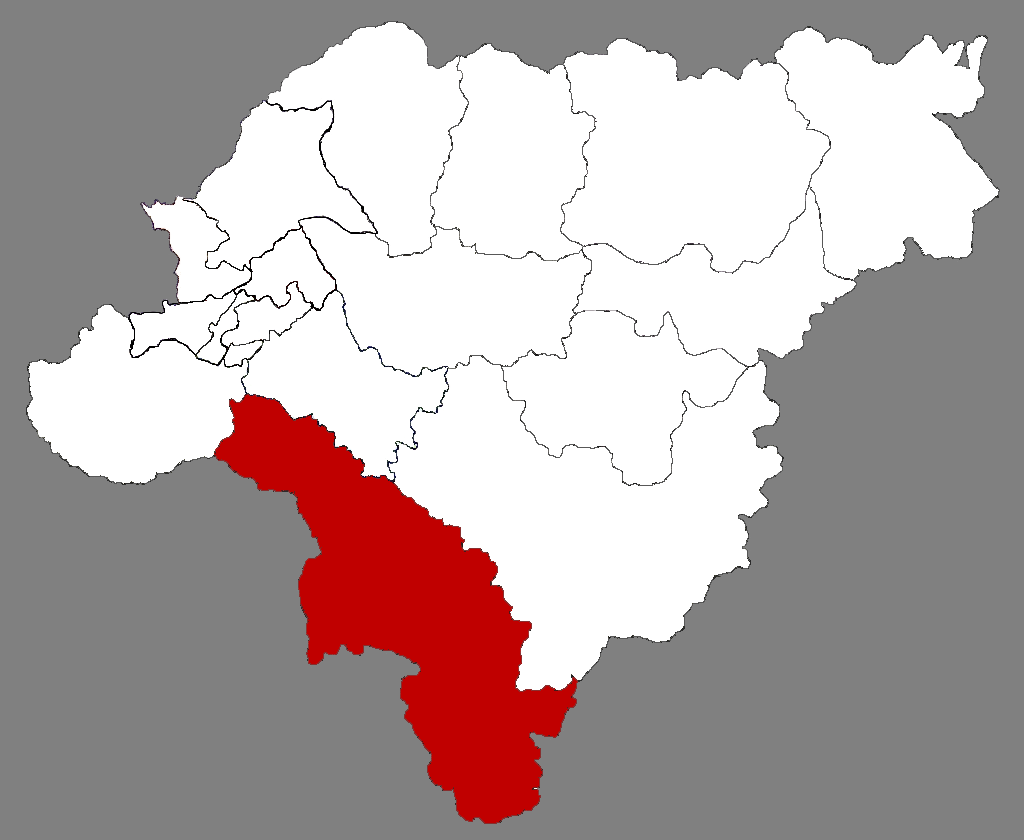
- Location of Wuchang in Harbin

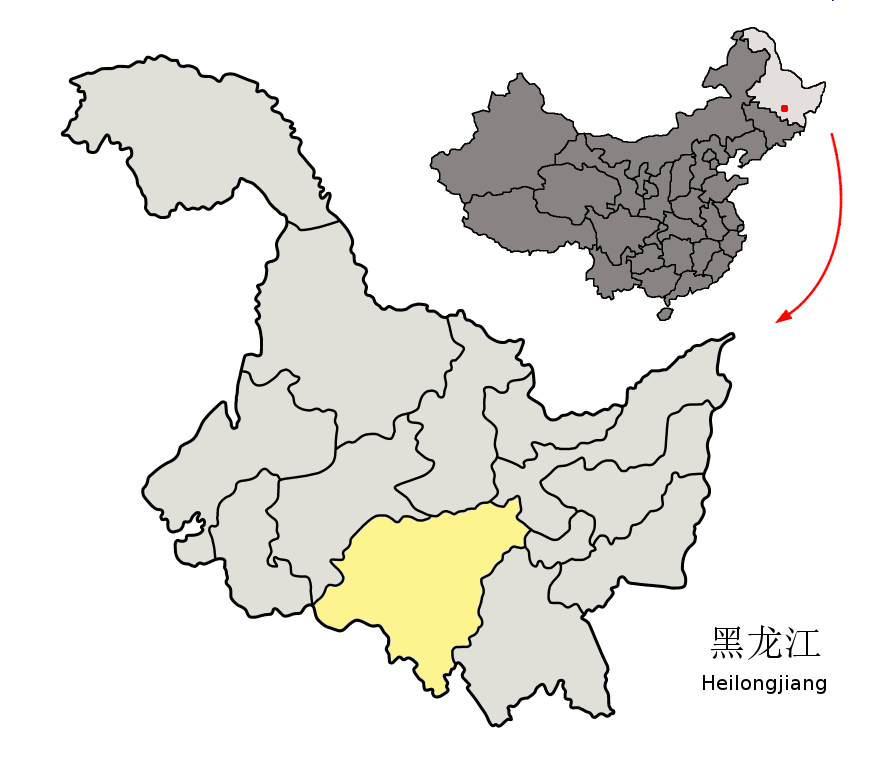
- Harbin in Heilongjiang
- Coordinates: 44°55′26″N 127°09′29″E
- Country: People's Republic of China
- Province: Heilongjiang
- Sub-provincial city: Harbin
- Divisions: 10 towns 7 townships

Area
  - Total: 7,502.0 km^{2} (2,896.5 sq mi)

Population (2018)
  - Total: 897,705
  - Density: 119.66/km^{2} (309.92/sq mi)
- Time zone: UTC+8 (China Standard)
- Postal code: 1502XX
- Climate: Dwa
- Website: hljwch.gov.cn

Wuchang (Chinese: 五常; pinyin: Wǔcháng) is a county-level city of Heilongjiang Province, Northeast China, under the administration of the prefecture-level city of Harbin. It borders Acheng District to the north, Shangzhi to the northeast, Shuangcheng District to the northwest, and Jilin Province to the south and the west.

The name "Wuchang" has been in use since 1855. At that time people began to reclaim wasteland, and built five noble lodges. It was changed to Wuchang Bureau in 1882, and changed to Wuchang Mansion in 1909. In 1913 Wuchang County was set up. It was changed to Wuchang City in 1993.

The area of Wuchang is 7,502.0 km^{2} (2,896.5 sq mi), and it had 979,627 population at the end of 2008.

== Geography and climate ==
Wuchang is a semi-mountainous town; its ground slopes from southeast to northwest. Wuchang rises over 450 metres above sea level. The mountain Zhangguangcai Ling twists toward the southeast; many hills appear in different layers, such as Laoye Ling and Eagle South Mountain. The Songnen Plain to the northwest provides a flat area with highly fertile soil for agriculture.

The Lalin River and Mangnu River run through Wuchang.

Like most of Northeast China, Wuchang has a monsoon-influenced humid continental climate (Köppen Dwa). The average temperature is 3.5 °C (38.3 °F). January, the coldest month, is about −19.1 °C (−2.4 °F). July is the hottest month at about 22.4 °C (72.3 °F). The annual precipitation is 625 millimetres or 24.6 inches; the frost-free season is 124 days and the annual sunshine hours are 2,576. It is quite normal that the temperature is around −25 to −30 °C or −13 to −22 °F during winter nights, with −19.1 °C (−2.4 °F) being approximately the middle value.

Climate data for Wuchang, elevation 195 m (640 ft), (1991–2020 normals, extremes 1981–2010)
Month	Jan	Feb	Mar	Apr	May	Jun	Jul	Aug	Sep	Oct	Nov	Dec	Year
Record high °C (°F)	3.0 (37.4)	9.5 (49.1)	19.7 (67.5)	29.0 (84.2)	34.0 (93.2)	37.3 (99.1)	35.7 (96.3)	35.8 (96.4)	30.3 (86.5)	26.4 (79.5)	19.6 (67.3)	9.4 (48.9)	37.3 (99.1)
Mean daily maximum °C (°F)	−11.5 (11.3)	−5.8 (21.6)	2.9 (37.2)	13.7 (56.7)	21.1 (70.0)	26.1 (79.0)	27.9 (82.2)	26.6 (79.9)	21.6 (70.9)	12.6 (54.7)	0.4 (32.7)	−9.2 (15.4)	10.5 (51.0)
Daily mean °C (°F)	−17.3 (0.9)	−12.2 (10.0)	−2.8 (27.0)	7.4 (45.3)	15.0 (59.0)	20.6 (69.1)	23.2 (73.8)	21.6 (70.9)	15.4 (59.7)	6.6 (43.9)	−4.6 (23.7)	−14.5 (5.9)	4.9 (40.8)
Mean daily minimum °C (°F)	−22.2 (−8.0)	−17.8 (0.0)	−8.1 (17.4)	1.5 (34.7)	9.1 (48.4)	15.6 (60.1)	19.0 (66.2)	17.3 (63.1)	9.9 (49.8)	1.5 (34.7)	−8.9 (16.0)	−19.0 (−2.2)	−0.2 (31.7)
Record low °C (°F)	−37.5 (−35.5)	−39.1 (−38.4)	−26.5 (−15.7)	−13.4 (7.9)	−4.4 (24.1)	5.3 (41.5)	9.6 (49.3)	6.6 (43.9)	−4.0 (24.8)	−14.7 (5.5)	−27.5 (−17.5)	−37.9 (−36.2)	−39.1 (−38.4)
Average precipitation mm (inches)	5.4 (0.21)	6.0 (0.24)	13.8 (0.54)	25.5 (1.00)	63.5 (2.50)	108.1 (4.26)	142.1 (5.59)	127.3 (5.01)	54.9 (2.16)	30.0 (1.18)	19.9 (0.78)	9.9 (0.39)	606.4 (23.86)
Average precipitation days (≥ 0.1 mm)	6.3	4.8	6.8	7.9	13.2	14.0	14.3	13.4	9.6	8.0	7.2	7.6	113.1
Average snowy days	9.1	6.8	7.9	2.8	0	0	0	0	0	2.3	8.1	10.2	47.2
Average relative humidity (%)	73	67	62	54	59	69	78	80	73	66	69	74	69
Mean monthly sunshine hours	153.6	177.8	212.0	209.6	229.5	233.9	214.5	209.0	218.7	182.2	142.1	136.7	2,319.6
Percentage possible sunshine	54	60	57	52	50	50	46	49	59	54	50	50	53
Source: China Meteorological Administration

== Administrative divisions ==
Wuchang City is divided into 10 towns, 2 ethnic towns, 9 townships and 3 ethnic townships.

10 towns

- Wuchang (五常镇), Shanhe (山河镇), Xiaoshanzi (小山子镇), Anjia (安家镇), Dujia (杜家镇), Beiyinhe (背荫河镇), Chonghe (冲河镇), Shahezi (沙河子镇), Xiangyang (向阳镇), Longfengshan (龙凤山镇)

2 ethnic towns

- Lalin Manchu (拉林满族镇), Niujia Manchu (牛家满族镇)

9 townships

- Xingsheng (兴盛乡), Zhiguang (志广乡), Weiguo (卫国乡), Changbao (常堡乡), Minyi (民意乡), Bajiazi (八家子乡), Zhangshan (长山乡), Xinglong (兴隆乡), Erhe (二河乡)

3 ethnic townships

- Hongqi Manchu (红旗满族乡), Minyue Korean (民乐朝鲜族乡), Yingchengzi Manzu (营城子满族乡)

== Economic situation ==
Wuchang has many advantages for agriculture, such as loamy soil, abundant water, and suitable weather. Grain crops dominate the mix such as rice, corn, soybean, sorghum, cereal and wheat. Other crops that contribute to the local economy include beet and tobacco. The short-grain rice produced in the Wuchang area is considered to be some of the best rice in China.
