= Sanhe, Jiangyou =

Sanhe 三合镇
- Town
- Location in Sichuan
- Coordinates: 31°47′12″N 104°45′56″E
- Country: People's Republic of China
- Province: Sichuan
- Prefecture-level city: Mianyang
- County-level city: Jiangyou
- Village-level divisions: 8 residential communities 19 villages
- Elevation: 541 m (1,775 ft)
- Time zone: UTC+8 (China Standard)
- Area code: 0816

Sanhe (Chinese: 三合; pinyin: Sānhé) is a town under the administration of Jiangyou City in northern Sichuan province, China, located on the eastern (left) bank of the Fu River opposite downtown Jiangyou. As of 2018, it has eight residential communities (社区) and 19 villages under its administration.
