= Yanghe Township, Sichuan =

Yanghe Township 杨河乡
- Township
- Location in Sichuan
- Coordinates: 29°13′29″N 103°23′37″E
- Country: People's Republic of China
- Province: Sichuan
- Prefecture-level city: Leshan
- Autonomous county: Ebian Yi Autonomous County
- Time zone: UTC+8 (China Standard)

Yanghe Township (simplified Chinese: 杨河乡; traditional Chinese: 楊河鄉; pinyin: Yánghé Xiāng) is a township under the administration of Ebian Yi Autonomous County, Sichuan, China. As of 2020, it has four villages under its administration:

- Gaowan Village (高湾村)
- Moujia Village (牟加村)
- Zhongzi Village (仲子村)
- Yaya Village (桠桠村)

== See also ==
- List of township-level divisions of Sichuan
