= Sanhe, Longnan =

Sanhe 三河镇
- Town
- Location in Gansu
- Coordinates: 33°18′00″N 105°09′49″E
- Country: People's Republic of China
- Province: Gansu
- Prefecture-level city: Longnan
- District: Wudu
- Village-level divisions: 16 villages
- Elevation: 1,049 m (3,442 ft)
- Time zone: UTC+8 (China Standard)
- Area code: 0939

Sanhe (Chinese: 三河; pinyin: Sānhé; lit. 'three rivers') is a town in Wudu District, Longnan, Gansu, People's Republic of China, located 23 kilometres (14 mi) southeast of downtown Longnan as the crow flies. As of 2018, it has 16 villages under its administration.

== See also ==
- List of township-level divisions of Gansu
