= Zhiping Township, Chongqing =

Zhiping Township 治平乡
- Township
- Location in Chongqing
- Coordinates: 31°48′15″N 108°48′12″E
- Country: People's Republic of China
- Direct-administered municipality: Chongqing
- County: Chengkou County
- Time zone: UTC+8 (China Standard)

Zhiping Township (simplified Chinese: 治平乡; traditional Chinese: 治平鄉; pinyin: Zhìpíng Xiāng) is a township in Chengkou County, Chongqing, China. As of 2020, it administers Huimin Residential Community (惠民社区) and the following four villages:

- Yanwan Village (岩湾村)
- Xinsheng Village (新胜村)
- Xinhong Village (新红村)
- Yanghe Village (阳河村)

== See also ==
- List of township-level divisions of Chongqing
