= Sanhe Township, Xuanhan County =

Sanhe Township 三河乡
- Township
- Location in Sichuan
- Coordinates: 31°21′49″N 107°48′22″E
- Country: People's Republic of China
- Province: Sichuan
- Prefecture-level city: Dazhou
- County: Xuanhan
- Village-level divisions: 1 residential community 6 villages
- Elevation: 348 m (1,142 ft)
- Time zone: UTC+8 (China Standard)
- Area code: 0818

Sanhe (Chinese: 三河; pinyin: Sānhé; lit. 'three rivers') is a township of Xuanhan County in northeastern Sichuan province, China, located about 7.6 kilometres (4.7 mi) east of the county seat. As of 2018, it has one residential community (社区) and six villages under its administration.

== See also ==
- List of township-level divisions of Sichuan
