= Chengzhong Subdistrict, Yingcheng =

Chengzhong Subdistrict 城中街道
- Subdistrict
- Location in Hubei
- Coordinates: 30°56′7.0″N 113°33′51.7″E
- Country: People's Republic of China
- Province: Hubei
- Prefecture-level city: Xiaogan
- County-level city: Yingcheng
- Elevation: 33 m (108 ft)

Population (2010)
  - Total: 134,010
- Time zone: UTC+8 (China Standard)
- Postal code: 432400
- Area code: 0712

Chengzhong Subdistrict (Chinese: 城中街道; pinyin: Chéngzhōng Jiēdào) is a subdistrict and the seat of the city of Yingcheng, Hubei province, People's Republic of China. Yingcheng is 96 kilometres (60 mi) from Wuhan, via China National Highway 107.

== Administrative divisions ==
As of 2011, it has 11 residential communities (社区) and 4 villages under its administration. In 2016, the subdistrict was made up of 12 communities and four villages.

Twelve communities:

- Yueyuan (月园社区), Wangjiatai (汪家台社区), Sanyanjing (三眼井社区), Guchengtai (古城台社区), Nianwu (碾屋社区), Guangming (光明社区), Gucheng (古城社区), Gongnonglu (工农路社区), Xinhe (新河社区), Changhu (长湖社区), Xingxing (星星社区), Chuntianmingyuan (春天名苑社区)

Four villages:

- Fanhe (范河村), Baofeng (保丰村), Guoguang (国光村), Zhouchen (周陈村)
