= Shanhe Township =

Shanhe Township 山河乡
- Township
- Location in Ningxia
- Coordinates: 35°30′46″N 106°9′4″E
- Country: People's Republic of China
- Autonomous region: Ningxia
- Prefecture-level city: Guyuan
- County: Longde County
- Time zone: UTC+8 (China Standard)

Shanhe Township (simplified Chinese: 山河乡; traditional Chinese: 山河鄉; pinyin: Shānhé Xiāng) is a township under the administration of Longde County, Ningxia, China. As of 2018, it has eight villages under its administration.
