= Sanhe, Hezheng County =

Sanhe 三合镇
- Town
- Location in Gansu
- Coordinates: 35°27′16″N 103°21′33″E
- Country: People's Republic of China
- Province: Gansu
- Autonomous prefecture: Linxia
- County: Hezheng
- Village-level divisions: 1 residential community and 7 villages
- Elevation: 2,112 m (6,929 ft)
- Time zone: UTC+8 (China Standard)
- Area code: 0930

Sanhe (Chinese: 三合; pinyin: Sānhé) is a town of Hezheng County in south-central Gansu province, China, located immediately north of the county seat and 20 kilometres (12 mi) southeast of Linxia City. As of 2018, it has one residential community and seven villages under its administration.

== See also ==
- List of township-level divisions of Gansu
