= Sanhe Township, Kangding =

Sanhe Township 三合乡
- Township
- Location in Sichuan
- Coordinates: 30°20′04″N 102°15′25″E
- Country: People's Republic of China
- Province: Sichuan
- Autonomous prefecture: Garzê
- County-level city: Kangding
- Village-level divisions: 13 villages
- Elevation: 1,845 m (6,053 ft)
- Time zone: UTC+8 (China Standard)
- Area code: 0836

Sanhe (Chinese: 三合; pinyin: Sānhé) was a historical township of Kangding, located in the eastern part of Garzê Tibetan Autonomous Prefecture in western Sichuan province, China. It is situated approximately 42 kilometres (26 mi) from the prefecture seat. As of 2018, it had 13 villages under its administration.

In December 2019, Sanhe Township was merged into Jintang Town (金汤镇).
