= Sanhe, Shaanxi =

Sanhe 三合镇
- Town
- Location relative to Sichuan
- Coordinates: 33°07′43″N 107°21′22″E
- Country: People's Republic of China
- Province: Shaanxi
- Prefecture-level city: Hanzhong
- County: Chenggu
- Village-level divisions: 1 residential community 7 villages
- Elevation: 475 m (1,558 ft)
- Time zone: UTC+8 (China Standard)
- Area code: 0916

Sanhe (Chinese: 三合; pinyin: Sānhé) is a town of Chenggu County in southern Shaanxi province, China, located on the southern (right) bank of the Han River and southeast across the river from the county seat. As of 2018, it has one residential community and seven villages under its administration. Motorists can take China National Highway 316 to access the county seat or G5 Beijing–Kunming Expressway to enter locations further away more quickly.
