= Zhiping, Gansu =

Zhiping 治平镇
- Town
- Location in Gansu
- Coordinates: 35°17′42″N 105°36′57″E
- Country: People's Republic of China
- Province: Gansu
- Prefecture-level city: Pingliang
- County: Jingning County
- Time zone: UTC+8 (China Standard)

Zhiping (Chinese: 治平; pinyin: Zhìpíng) is a town under the administration of Jingning County, Gansu, China. As of 2020, it administers the following twelve villages:

- Hougou Village (后沟村)
- Liuhe Village (刘河村)
- Dazhuang Village (大庄村)
- Leigou Village (雷沟村)
- Zhupu Village (朱堡村)
- Anning Village (安宁村)
- Wuping Village (伍坪村)
- Liugou Village (柳沟村)
- Chenxia Village (陈峡村)
- Mahe Village (马合村)
- Yangdian Village (杨店村)
- Yinpo Village (阴坡村)
