= Yanghe Township, Ningxia =

Yanghe Township 杨河乡
- Township
- Location in Ningxia
- Coordinates: 35°40′35″N 105°59′25″E
- Country: People's Republic of China
- Autonomous region: Ningxia
- Prefecture-level city: Guyuan
- County: Longde County
- Time zone: UTC+8 (China Standard)

Yanghe Township (simplified Chinese: 杨河乡; traditional Chinese: 楊河鄉; pinyin: Yánghé Xiāng) is a township under the administration of Longde County, Ningxia, China. As of 2018, it has five villages under its administration.
