= Yingcheng =

Yingcheng 应城市
- County-level city
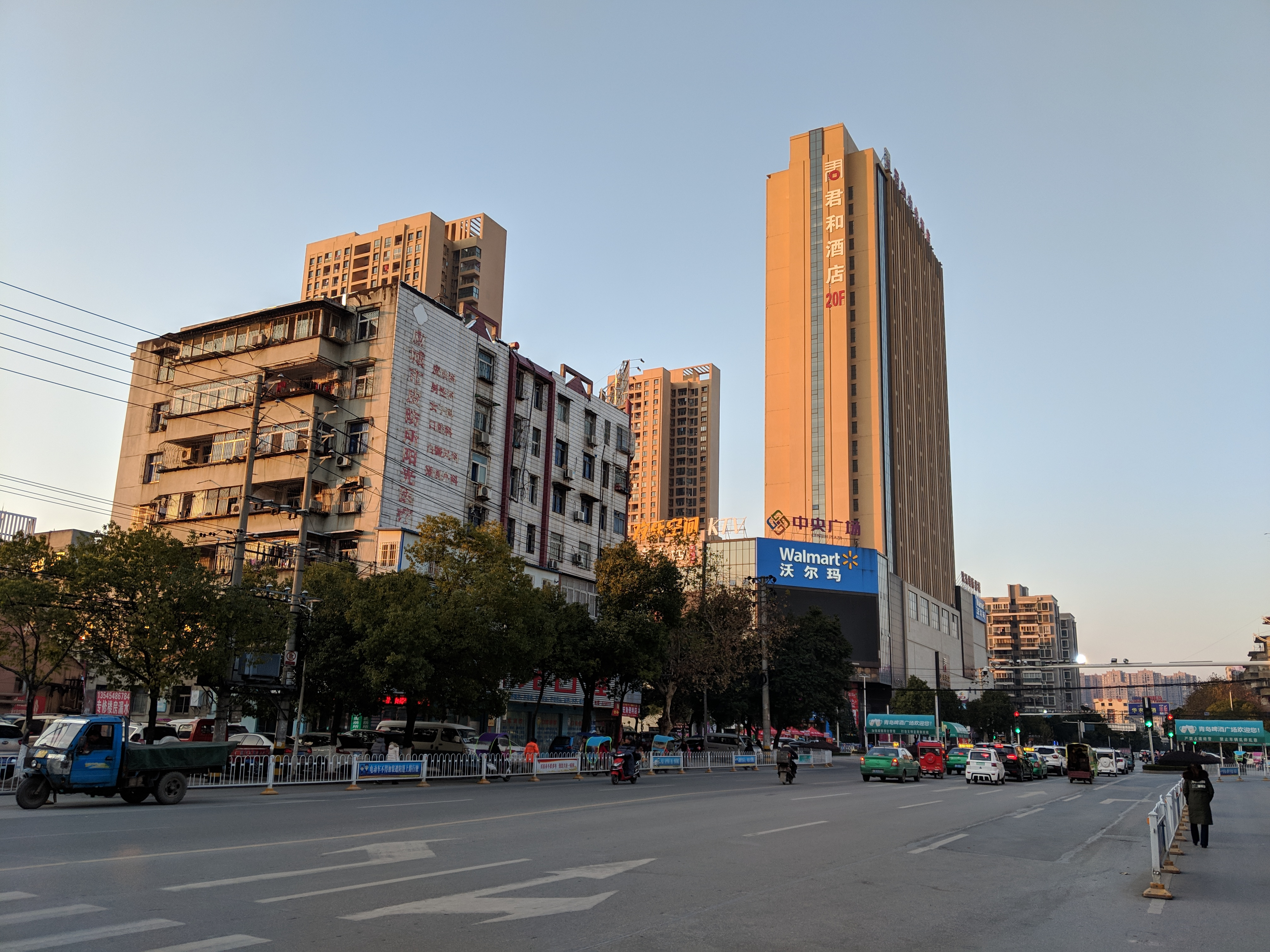
- Street view near the center of Yingcheng

- Location within Hubei
- Coordinates: 30°55′41″N 113°34′23″E
- Country: People's Republic of China
- Province: Hubei
- Prefecture-level city: Xiaogan
- City seat: Chengzhong

Area
  - County-level city: 1,103 km^{2} (426 sq mi)
  - Urban: 183.78 km^{2} (70.96 sq mi)
- Elevation: 29 m (95 ft)

Population (2020 census)
  - County-level city: 476,596
  - Density: 432.1/km^{2} (1,119/sq mi)
  - Urban: 304,741
- Time zone: UTC+8 (China Standard)
- Postal code: 432400
- Area code: 0712

Yingcheng (simplified Chinese: 应城; traditional Chinese: 應城; pinyin: Yìngchéng) is a county-level city of about 500,000 inhabitants in Xiaogan, eastern Hubei province, People's Republic of China.

== History ==
On December 26, 2019, a minor earthquake struck the area.

== Township-level divisions ==
Five subdistricts:

- Chengzhong Subdistrict (城中街道), Chengbei Subdistrict (城北街道), Silipeng Subdistrict (四里棚街道), Dongmafang Subdistrict (东马坊街道), Changjiangbu Subdistrict (长江埠街道)

Ten towns:

- Tiandian (田店镇), Yanghe (杨河镇), Sanhe (三合镇), Langjun (郎君镇), Huangtan (黄滩镇), Tian'e (天鹅镇), Yihe (义和镇), Chenhe (陈河镇), Yangling (杨岭镇), Tangchi (汤池镇)

Two other areas:

- Yingcheng Economic Area (经济技术开发区), Nanyuan Farm (南垸良种场)

== Notable people ==
- Li Qing (born 1972), Chinese diver
- Yu Linxiang (born 1945), Chinese general
- Jiang Zuobin (1884–1942), Chinese politician and diplomat
- Yang Deqing (born 1942), Chinese general
- Liu Renjing (1902–1987), Chinese politician

== Climate ==
Climate data for Yingcheng, elevation 30 m (98 ft), (1991–2020 normals, extremes 1981–present)
Month	Jan	Feb	Mar	Apr	May	Jun	Jul	Aug	Sep	Oct	Nov	Dec	Year
Record high °C (°F)	19.3 (66.7)	27.0 (80.6)	32.3 (90.1)	34.1 (93.4)	36.6 (97.9)	37.8 (100.0)	37.8 (100.0)	38.8 (101.8)	38.5 (101.3)	33.8 (92.8)	28.2 (82.8)	21.4 (70.5)	38.8 (101.8)
Mean daily maximum °C (°F)	8.0 (46.4)	11.2 (52.2)	16.0 (60.8)	22.4 (72.3)	27.2 (81.0)	30.1 (86.2)	32.4 (90.3)	32.3 (90.1)	28.6 (83.5)	23.1 (73.6)	16.7 (62.1)	10.5 (50.9)	21.5 (70.8)
Daily mean °C (°F)	3.5 (38.3)	6.3 (43.3)	11.1 (52.0)	17.3 (63.1)	22.3 (72.1)	25.9 (78.6)	28.5 (83.3)	27.8 (82.0)	23.4 (74.1)	17.6 (63.7)	11.3 (52.3)	5.5 (41.9)	16.7 (62.1)
Mean daily minimum °C (°F)	0.0 (32.0)	2.4 (36.3)	6.9 (44.4)	12.7 (54.9)	18.0 (64.4)	22.3 (72.1)	25.2 (77.4)	24.3 (75.7)	19.5 (67.1)	13.4 (56.1)	7.1 (44.8)	1.7 (35.1)	12.8 (55.0)
Record low °C (°F)	−11.4 (11.5)	−9.9 (14.2)	−4.1 (24.6)	0.4 (32.7)	6.7 (44.1)	11.5 (52.7)	18.2 (64.8)	15.8 (60.4)	10.3 (50.5)	0.7 (33.3)	−4.6 (23.7)	−14.4 (6.1)	−14.4 (6.1)
Average precipitation mm (inches)	38.1 (1.50)	48.0 (1.89)	69.1 (2.72)	113.4 (4.46)	139.9 (5.51)	179.3 (7.06)	213.8 (8.42)	114.8 (4.52)	68.5 (2.70)	66.8 (2.63)	47.8 (1.88)	24.4 (0.96)	1,123.9 (44.25)
Average precipitation days (≥ 0.1 mm)	8.2	9.5	11.2	10.7	12.3	11.1	10.7	9.2	7.6	9.4	8.8	6.9	115.6
Average snowy days	4.1	2.6	1.1	0	0	0	0	0	0	0	0.5	1.6	9.9
Average relative humidity (%)	75	76	75	75	75	80	82	81	78	77	77	74	77
Mean monthly sunshine hours	103.9	101.8	130.3	154.2	167.2	152.6	199.8	208.8	160.1	147.4	134.4	121.5	1,782
Percentage possible sunshine	32	32	35	40	39	36	47	51	44	42	43	39	40
Source: China Meteorological Administration
