= Luo Yanlin =

Chinese serial rapist (executed 2008)

- 罗彦林
- Born: 1960; China
- Died: September 10, 2008 (aged 48); Gansu, China
- Cause of death: Execution
- Occupation: School teacher
- Known for: Sexually assaulting 39 girls

Luo Yanlin (Chinese: 罗彦林) was a Chinese school teacher who was executed for sexually assaulting and raping 39 girls between 1988 and 2006. He was arrested and executed in 2008.

== Crimes ==
Luo worked at three primary schools in Jingning County in northwest China's Gansu province. He would lure the girls into his office under the pretext of tutoring. The victims were between 7 and 14 years of age.

Luo was arrested in 2006 when several former victims informed the police about his crimes. Investigators found that at least 26 girls had been raped. The official number of assault victims was deemed to be 39, but the actual number was probably higher due to some victims not wanting to give evidence. Luo raped one girl repeatedly through six years of her primary schooling. He raped another victim more than 10 times when she was 12 years old.

One girl Han Mou (韩某) reported Luo to the police, saying that Luo raped her dozens of times on the pretext of explaining homework. Another girl Zhang Mou (张某) confirmed that Luo repeatedly raped and molested Han and that both Zhang and Han were 12 years old at the time.

== Arrest and execution ==
At the time of his arrest, Luo was a school principal. He went on trial after confessing to all of the crimes and was sentenced to death on July 4, 2007. According to the court, "Luo's crimes have seriously harmed the young girls' mental and physical health, disturbed normal teaching and had an extremely negative impact on society."

Luo was executed in Gansu province on September 10, 2008.
