= Shanhe, Gansu =

Shanhe 山河镇
- Town
- Location in Gansu
- Coordinates: 35°29′42″N 108°21′7″E
- Country: People's Republic of China
- Province: Gansu
- Prefecture-level city: Qingyang
- County: Zhengning County
- Time zone: UTC+8 (China Standard)

Shanhe (Chinese: 山河; pinyin: Shānhé) is a town under the administration of Zhengning County, Gansu, China. As of 2018, it has 2 residential communities and 11 villages under its administration.
