= Sanhe, Hubei =

Sanhe 三合镇
- Town
- Location in Hubei
- Coordinates: 30°59′07″N 113°40′57″E
- Country: People's Republic of China
- Province: Hubei
- Prefecture-level city: Xiaogan
- County-level city: Yingcheng
- Village-level divisions: 33 villages
- Elevation: 34 m (112 ft)

Population (2010)
  - Total: 28,568
- Time zone: UTC+8 (China Standard)
- Area code: 0712

Sanhe (Chinese: 三合; pinyin: Sānhé) is a town under the administration of the county-level city of Yingcheng in eastern Hubei, People's Republic of China, located 12 kilometres (7.5 mi) northeast of downtown Yingcheng and 23 km (14 mi) northwest of Xiaogan. As of 2011, it has 33 villages under its administration.

== Administrative divisions ==
Villages:

- Sanhe (三合村), Huali (华李村), Lutai (鲁台村), Gaolu (高卢村), Tianjing (天井村), Tumen (土门村), Duimian (对面村), Shuangdun (双墩村), Yihe (宜和村), Caoyang (曹杨村), Bapeng (八彭村), Yaojing (么井村), Sanjie (三结村), Yuechi (月池村), Liufen (六份村), Lizha (李榨村), Weida (魏大村), Xitou (西头村), Chenyuan (陈垸村), Liuhu (刘胡村), Maochong (毛冲村), Xuzhou (徐周村), Xuliu (徐刘村), Yuzhang (余张村), Tuhuang (土黄村), Zhouyang (周杨村), Wushan (伍山村), Lianghe (两河村), Zhangwang (张王村), Shuangqiao (双桥村), Gaoxu (高徐村), Xudun (徐墩村), Tangxiang (唐巷村)

== See also ==
- List of township-level divisions of Hubei
