= Zhuanglang County =

Zhuanglang County 庄浪县
- County
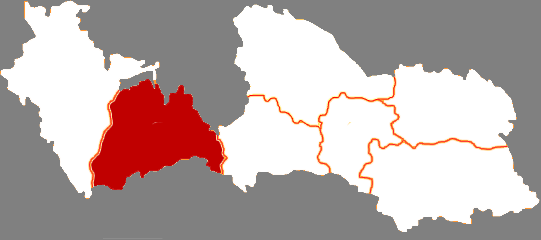
- Zhuanglang in Pingliang

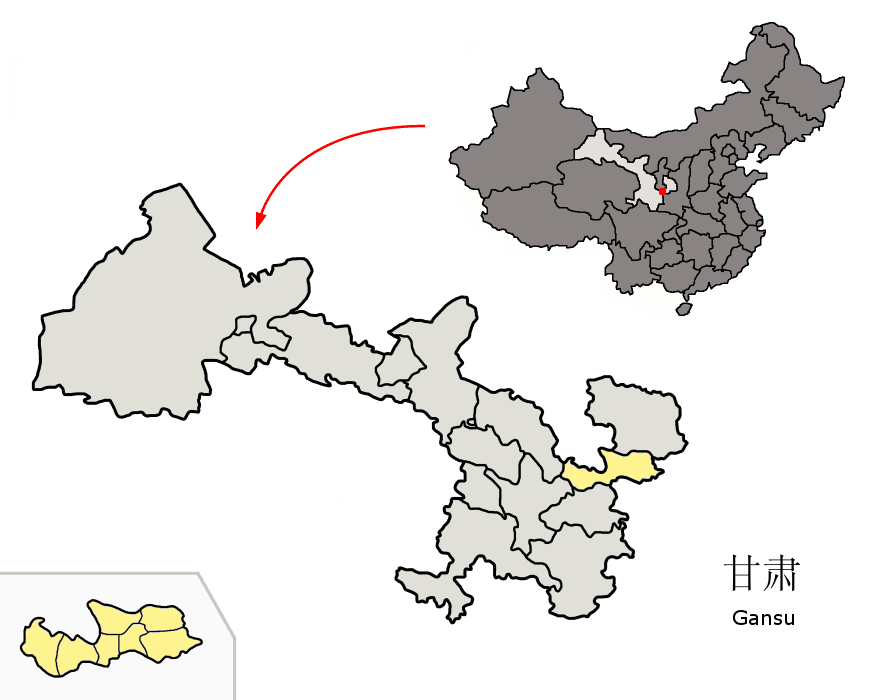
- Pingliang in Gansu
- Coordinates (Zhuanglang government): 35°12′10″N 106°02′10″E
- Country: China
- Province: Gansu
- Prefecture-level city: Pingliang
- County seat: Shuiluo

Area
  - Total: 1,553.14 km^{2} (599.67 sq mi)

Population (2019)
  - Total: 453,120
  - Density: 291.74/km^{2} (755.61/sq mi)
- Time zone: UTC+8 (China Standard)
- Postal code: 744600

Zhuanglang County
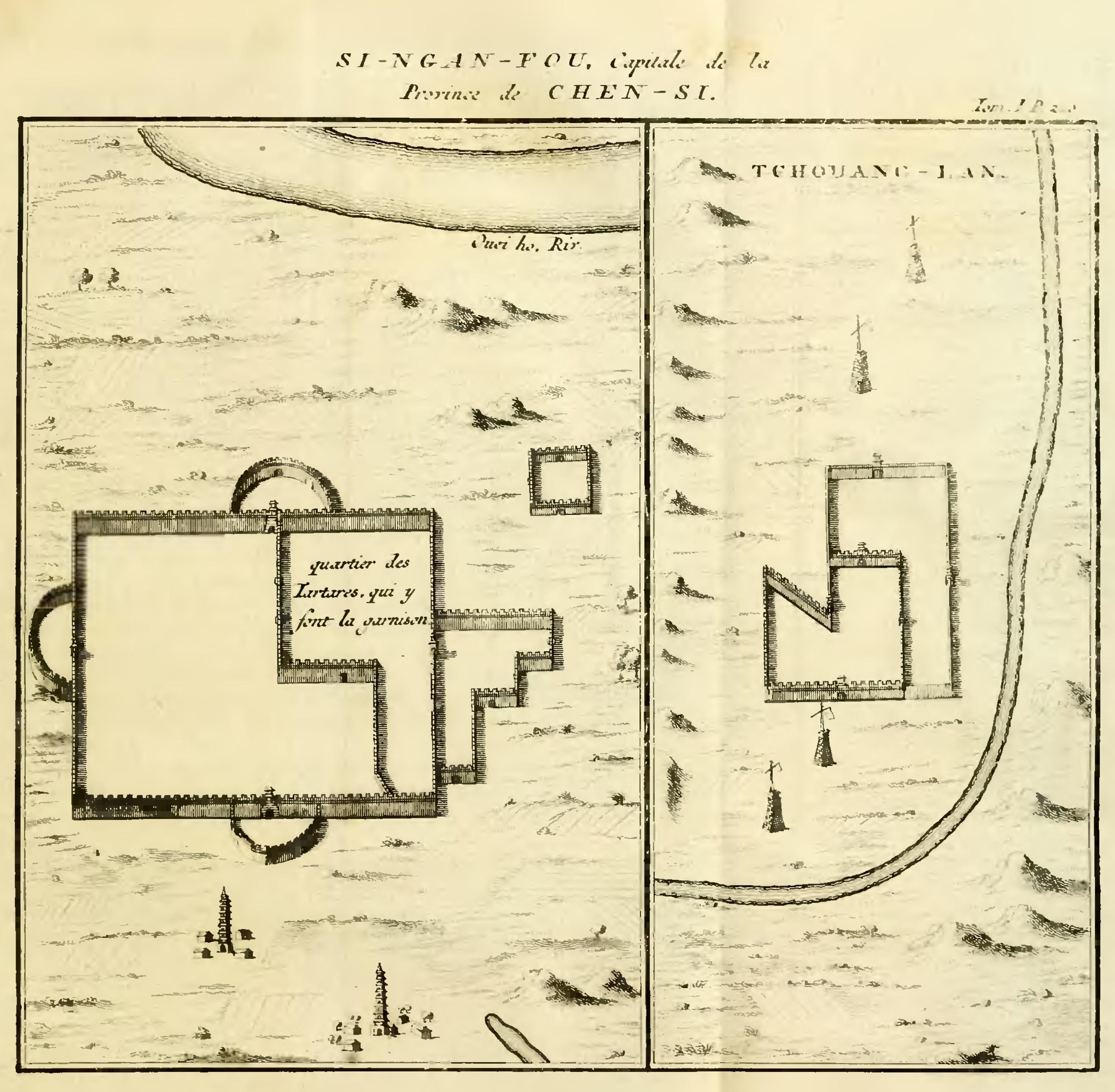
- Maps of "Si-ngan-fou" and "Tchouang-lan" from Du Halde's 1736 Description of China, based on Jesuit accounts
- Traditional Chinese: 莊浪縣
- Simplified Chinese: 庄浪县
- Postal: Chwanglang
Transcriptions
Standard Mandarin
- Hanyu Pinyin: Zhuānglàng Xiàn
- Wade–Giles: Chuang-lang Hsien

Zhuanglang County is a rural county under the administration of the prefecture-level city of Pingliang in the east of Gansu Province, China. It borders Ningxia to the north, the Gansu county-level divisions of Huating City to the east, Zhangjiachuan County to the southeast, Qin'an County to the southwest, and Jingning County to the west. Nearby major cities include Pingliang, Tianshui, Guyuan, and Lanzhou.

The county seat of Zhuanglang—once known as Zhuanglang, Tchouang-lan, Chwang-lan, or Chwanglang—is now called Shuiluo. Its walled town was an important regional post in late imperial China, visited by Jesuit missionaries and reported on by the Macartney Embassy. It remains a relatively busy administrative, educational, and trading spot for the county. Other market towns in the county include Nanhu, Zhudian, and Handian in the north, south-west, and south-east respectively.

The people of Zhuanglang are predominantly farmers, producing wheat and potatoes on terraced hills. The farmers of Zhuanglang were proclaimed in the 1980s for having terraced all available hillside, and a monument in the county town records the famous 'Zhuanglang Spirit' by which this was achieved.

In recent years, education has been a priority for the local government. With the help of World Bank funding, schools in Zhuanglang have been well supported. Nearly all children now complete primary education, while there are 23 junior middle schools, and 3 senior middle schools which send students on to colleges and universities.

The cultural sites of Zhuanglang include:

- Yunyasi. The beautiful Yunya temple forms the centrepiece of a protected forest park in the far east of the county, around 40 km (25 mi) from the county town.
- Zi Jin Temple. This temple was re-opened in 1986 after the Cultural Revolution and is in the centre of the county town. Close by is an earth fortress dating from the era of Mongol invasions through this region.
- Chen Dong Temple. This more isolated Taoist temple is to be found in the north-east of the county.

The highest point of the county is Taomushan at 2857m above sea level.

Population (2005 est.)

- Total = 420,000
- Ethnic composition = 99% Han Chinese, 1% Hui Muslim
- Major Towns
  - Shuiluo = 30,000
  - Nanhu = 10,000
  - Zhudian = 6,000
  - Handian = 5,000

== Administrative Divisions ==
Zhuanglang County is divided to 1 Subdistrict, 15 towns and 3 townships.

Subdistricts

- Shuiluo (水洛街道)

Towns

- Shuiluo (水洛镇)
- Nanhu (南湖镇)
- Zhudian (朱店镇)
- Wanquan (万泉镇)
- Handian (韩店镇)
- Dazhuang (大庄镇)
- Tonghua (通化镇)

-Towns are upgraded from Township.

- Wolong (卧龙镇)
- Yangchuan (阳川镇)
- Pan'an (盘安镇)
- Yongning (永宁镇)
- Liangyi (良邑镇) - it is renamed from Liangzhu.
- Yuebao (岳堡镇)
- Liuliang (柳梁镇)
- Nanping (南坪镇镇)

Townships

- Yanghe Township (杨河乡)
- Zhaodun Township (赵墩乡)
- Zhenghe Township (郑河乡)

== Climate ==
Climate data for Zhuanglang, elevation 1,631 m (5,351 ft), (1991–2020 normals, extremes 1981–2010)
Month	Jan	Feb	Mar	Apr	May	Jun	Jul	Aug	Sep	Oct	Nov	Dec	Year
Record high °C (°F)	11.8 (53.2)	17.8 (64.0)	24.4 (75.9)	29.3 (84.7)	30.3 (86.5)	32.8 (91.0)	34.9 (94.8)	32.7 (90.9)	32.6 (90.7)	24.5 (76.1)	19.2 (66.6)	14.2 (57.6)	34.9 (94.8)
Mean daily maximum °C (°F)	2.0 (35.6)	5.4 (41.7)	11.2 (52.2)	17.6 (63.7)	21.6 (70.9)	25.0 (77.0)	26.7 (80.1)	25.5 (77.9)	20.4 (68.7)	14.7 (58.5)	9.0 (48.2)	3.5 (38.3)	15.2 (59.4)
Daily mean °C (°F)	−4.8 (23.4)	−1.1 (30.0)	4.3 (39.7)	10.3 (50.5)	14.6 (58.3)	18.3 (64.9)	20.4 (68.7)	19.3 (66.7)	14.6 (58.3)	8.6 (47.5)	2.5 (36.5)	−3.3 (26.1)	8.6 (47.6)
Mean daily minimum °C (°F)	−9.7 (14.5)	−5.8 (21.6)	−0.9 (30.4)	4.1 (39.4)	8.2 (46.8)	12.2 (54.0)	15.0 (59.0)	14.3 (57.7)	10.2 (50.4)	4.3 (39.7)	−2.1 (28.2)	−8.0 (17.6)	3.5 (38.3)
Record low °C (°F)	−21.7 (−7.1)	−19.6 (−3.3)	−14.1 (6.6)	−7.5 (18.5)	−3.1 (26.4)	2.3 (36.1)	7.2 (45.0)	4.9 (40.8)	−0.1 (31.8)	−8.7 (16.3)	−15.0 (5.0)	−23.5 (−10.3)	−23.5 (−10.3)
Average precipitation mm (inches)	5.1 (0.20)	6.8 (0.27)	13.6 (0.54)	28.5 (1.12)	49.5 (1.95)	76.5 (3.01)	100.0 (3.94)	92.0 (3.62)	72.8 (2.87)	41.7 (1.64)	11.7 (0.46)	3.2 (0.13)	501.4 (19.75)
Average precipitation days (≥ 0.1 mm)	5.8	6.0	6.9	7.3	10.9	11.8	12.8	12.1	12.4	10.8	5.9	3.4	106.1
Average snowy days	10.3	9.2	5.9	1.4	0.2	0	0	0	0	1.0	4.7	6.7	39.4
Average relative humidity (%)	64	63	59	56	60	66	72	74	78	77	72	65	67
Mean monthly sunshine hours	145.5	135.5	170.4	200.9	216.6	203.8	198.3	185.4	132.4	133.3	136.4	151.1	2,009.6
Percentage possible sunshine	46	44	46	51	50	47	45	45	36	39	45	50	45
Source: China Meteorological Administration
