= Jingning County, Gansu =

Jingning County 静宁县
- County
- Location of the seat in Gansu
- Coordinates: 35°24′N 105°42′E
- Country: China
- Province: Gansu
- Prefecture-level city: Pingliang
- County seat: Chengguan

Area
  - Total: 2,193 km^{2} (847 sq mi)

Population (2019)
  - Total: 482,000
  - Density: 220/km^{2} (569/sq mi)
- Time zone: UTC+8 (China Standard)
- Postal code: 743400

Jingning County (simplified Chinese: 静宁县; traditional Chinese: 靜寧縣; pinyin: Jìngníng Xiàn) is an administrative district in Gansu, China. It is one of 58 counties of Gansu. It is part of the Pingliang prefecture, with the city of the same name being the prefecture seat. Its postal code is 743400, and in 2006, its population was 463,400 people. Its county seat is Chengguan.

The county government's jurisdiction is over 19 townships, 392 villages, 2,320 other communities and 4 neighbourhoods.

== History ==
There is evidence of Neolithic settlements in Jingning. The area was also inhabited during most of Chinese history, including the Three Kingdoms period. Sites have been dated to the Qin dynasty.

During the Second Sino-Japanese War, the area was evacuated (1940). The Communist Long March entered Jingning on September 10, 1935. Mao Zedong set up a headquarters in Shi Pu. The Communists left the next month. However, the county was taken under Communist control by the People's Liberation Army during the Chinese Civil War. PLA troops entered on August 6, 1949. They met little resistance.

== Geographical location ==
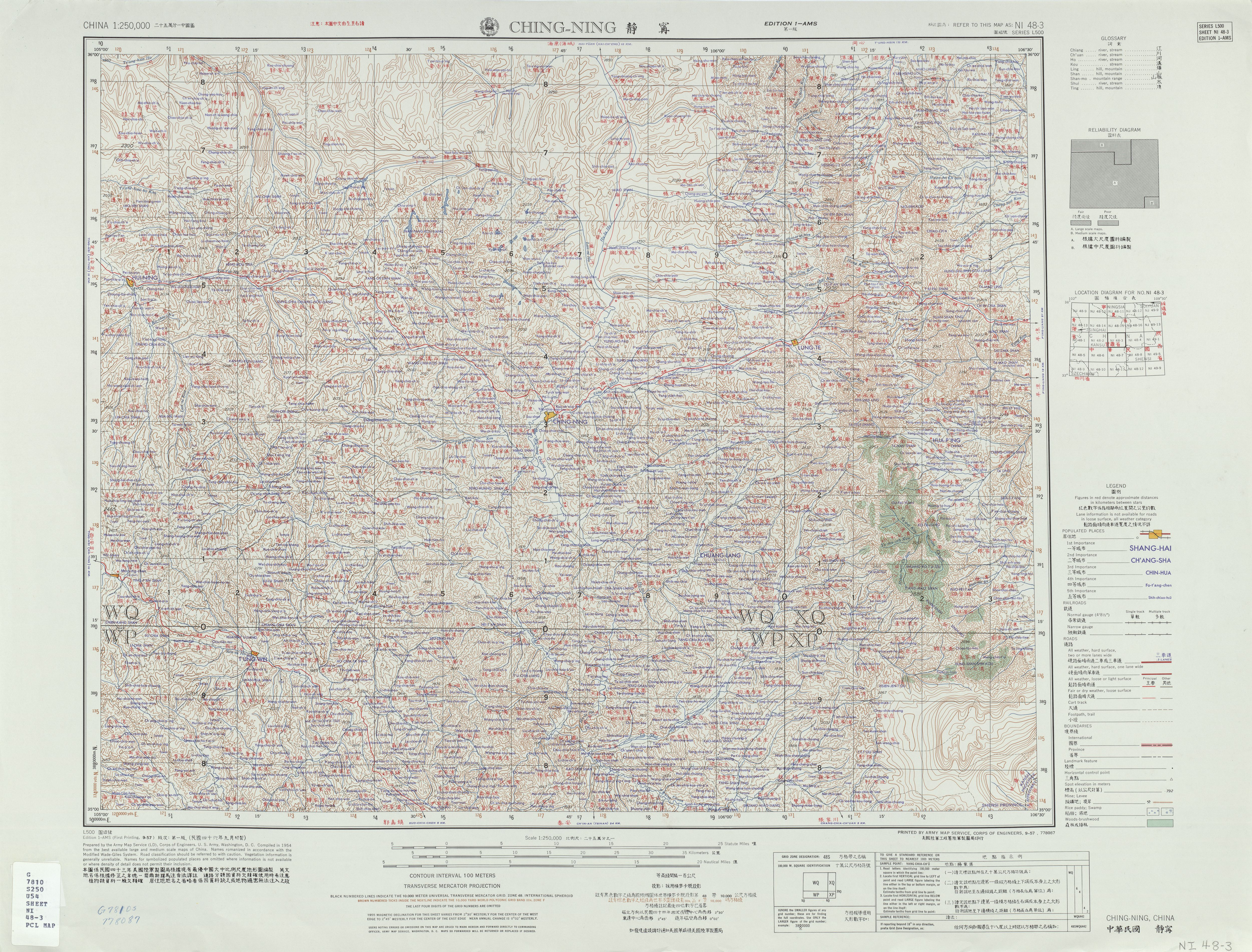
Map including Jingning (labeled as CHING-NING (walled) 靜𡩋) (AMS, 1954)

Located in the Loess Plateau, it is at an altitude of around 2,000 meters. The county has an area of 2,193 km^{2}. Out of its population of 463,400, 444,500 (95.92%) are registered as working in agriculture. Ethnic Han and Hui make up most of the population.

== Climate ==
The average annual temperature is 7.1 °C (44.8 °F), and the climate regime is classified as semi-arid. The area is frost-free for 159 days a year, and there are an average of 2238 hours of sunshine a year. The summer is the 'wet season' whereas the spring and the winter are drier. Average annual rainfall is 450.8 mm (17.75 in).

Climate data for Jingning, elevation 1,656 m (5,433 ft), (1991–2020 normals, extremes 1981–2010)
Month	Jan	Feb	Mar	Apr	May	Jun	Jul	Aug	Sep	Oct	Nov	Dec	Year
Record high °C (°F)	10.6 (51.1)	17.1 (62.8)	24.8 (76.6)	29.5 (85.1)	30.3 (86.5)	33.4 (92.1)	35.4 (95.7)	33.2 (91.8)	31.4 (88.5)	25.0 (77.0)	17.7 (63.9)	12.6 (54.7)	35.4 (95.7)
Mean daily maximum °C (°F)	1.2 (34.2)	4.7 (40.5)	10.7 (51.3)	17.3 (63.1)	21.4 (70.5)	24.9 (76.8)	26.6 (79.9)	25.4 (77.7)	20.1 (68.2)	14.3 (57.7)	8.3 (46.9)	2.8 (37.0)	14.8 (58.7)
Daily mean °C (°F)	−5.7 (21.7)	−1.9 (28.6)	3.8 (38.8)	10 (50)	14.4 (57.9)	18.2 (64.8)	20.3 (68.5)	19.3 (66.7)	14.4 (57.9)	8.3 (46.9)	1.7 (35.1)	−4.1 (24.6)	8.2 (46.8)
Mean daily minimum °C (°F)	−10.8 (12.6)	−6.7 (19.9)	−1.5 (29.3)	3.8 (38.8)	8.1 (46.6)	12.2 (54.0)	15.1 (59.2)	14.5 (58.1)	10.2 (50.4)	4.0 (39.2)	−2.9 (26.8)	−8.9 (16.0)	3.1 (37.6)
Record low °C (°F)	−23.4 (−10.1)	−21.0 (−5.8)	−15.1 (4.8)	−6.3 (20.7)	−3.7 (25.3)	3.2 (37.8)	7.3 (45.1)	6.0 (42.8)	−0.7 (30.7)	−11.6 (11.1)	−17.0 (1.4)	−25.6 (−14.1)	−25.6 (−14.1)
Average precipitation mm (inches)	3.6 (0.14)	4.9 (0.19)	11.0 (0.43)	25.9 (1.02)	49.2 (1.94)	68.9 (2.71)	85.9 (3.38)	82.2 (3.24)	65.7 (2.59)	37.4 (1.47)	9.8 (0.39)	1.7 (0.07)	446.2 (17.57)
Average precipitation days (≥ 0.1 mm)	4.3	4.4	6.2	6.8	9.5	11.2	12.2	11.9	12.2	9.7	5.4	2.6	96.4
Average snowy days	8.1	7.6	5.1	1.5	0.1	0	0	0	0	1.1	4.1	4.9	32.5
Average relative humidity (%)	61	60	57	54	58	65	70	73	77	75	70	62	65
Mean monthly sunshine hours	159.5	146.7	179.4	204.6	222.2	209.5	205.8	191.1	138.5	142.6	147.3	164.2	2,111.4
Percentage possible sunshine	51	47	48	52	51	48	47	46	38	41	48	54	48
Source: China Meteorological Administration

== Administrative divisions ==
Jingning County is divided to 1 subdistrict, 17 towns and 7 townships.

Subdistricts

- Chengqu (城区街道)

Towns

- Chengguan (城关镇)
- Weirong (威戎镇)
- Jieshipu (界石铺镇)
- Bali (八里镇)
- Lidian (李店镇)
- Gucheng (古城镇)
- Renda (仁大镇)
- Gangou (甘沟镇)
- Chengchuan (城川镇)
- Caowu (曹务镇)
- Leida (雷大镇)
- Sihe (四河镇)
- Xixiang (细巷镇)
- Shuangxian (双岘镇)
- Zhiping (治平镇)
- Hongsi (红寺镇)
- Yuan'an (原安镇)

Townships

- Siqiao Township (司桥乡)
- Yuwan Township (余湾乡)
- Jiahe Township (贾河乡)
- Shengou Township (深沟乡)
- Xindian Township (新店乡)
- Sanhe Township (三合乡)
- Lingzhi Township (灵芝乡)

== Economy ==
Among the items it produces are wheat, potatoes, corn, millet, buckwheat, oats, sesame, rapeseed, apples, pears and vegetables. The county is environmentally diverse, with more than 70 species of tree existing within the county, including apple trees, pear trees and the ash tree. For fruit production, the south of the county is more prevalent for apples, whereas pears are grown in the north. Many other things are cultivated in the county, including lilacs, leeks, garlic and licorice.

Mining also makes up part of the economy; iron ore, lead, zinc, white clay, and limestone are all mined in places such as Gaohui.

== Transport ==
- China National Highway 312

== Natural resources ==
Wildlife

Jingning has a variety of diverse wildlife; tigers, bears, jackals, deer and Mongolian gazelle all inhabit the county. The county government registers 15 varieties of mammal as well as 27 types of bird in addition to 13 kinds of reptile and amphibians. Animals are also used in agriculture; pigs, cattle and chickens are the main animals used for farming. There are 31 varieties of rose grown in the county, along with many other varieties of wild flower.

== Culture ==
Jingning roasted chicken is the local delicacy, the dish is included on the Gansu Intangible Cultural Heritage List. The dish is well known throughout Gansu, Ningxia and Shaanxi provinces. In 2021 more than one million chickens were processed in Jingning.

== Tourism ==
Attractions

- Wen Miao (or "Xian Shi Wen Miao", simplified Chinese: 先师文庙; traditional Chinese: 先師文廟): A Confucian temple dating from 1543, built by scholar Ming Jiajing over 21 years. It covers 18,076 m^{2} (194,570 sq ft). It was repaired by the Kangxi Emperor between 1692 and 1696. It was granted 'national heritage' status by the central government in 1993. On July 12 every year a festival is held there which usually attracts around 10,000 people.
- Jingning Mosque: It was built in 1536 and originally covered only 700 m^{2} (7,500 sq ft), but with an influx of Muslims into the county, it was increased to 2,100 m^{2} (23,000 sq ft) in 1712.
- Wutai Mountain
- Fengtai Mountain: Also called Horse Stables Mountain.
- Saving Dragon Mountain
- Cheng Ji Cultural City: Built to commemorate Fuxi.
- West Ling Mountain Park
- Jieshipu Red Army Long March Memorial Museum: Commemorates the Long March of the People's Liberation Army in the county seat.
- Immortal Gap
- Pearl forest

== Notable people ==
- Luo Yanlin, schoolteacher in Jingning County who was executed on September 10, 2008 for the rape of several schoolchildren.

== See also ==
- List of administrative divisions of Gansu
