= List of China tornadoes =

List of tornadoes in the country of China

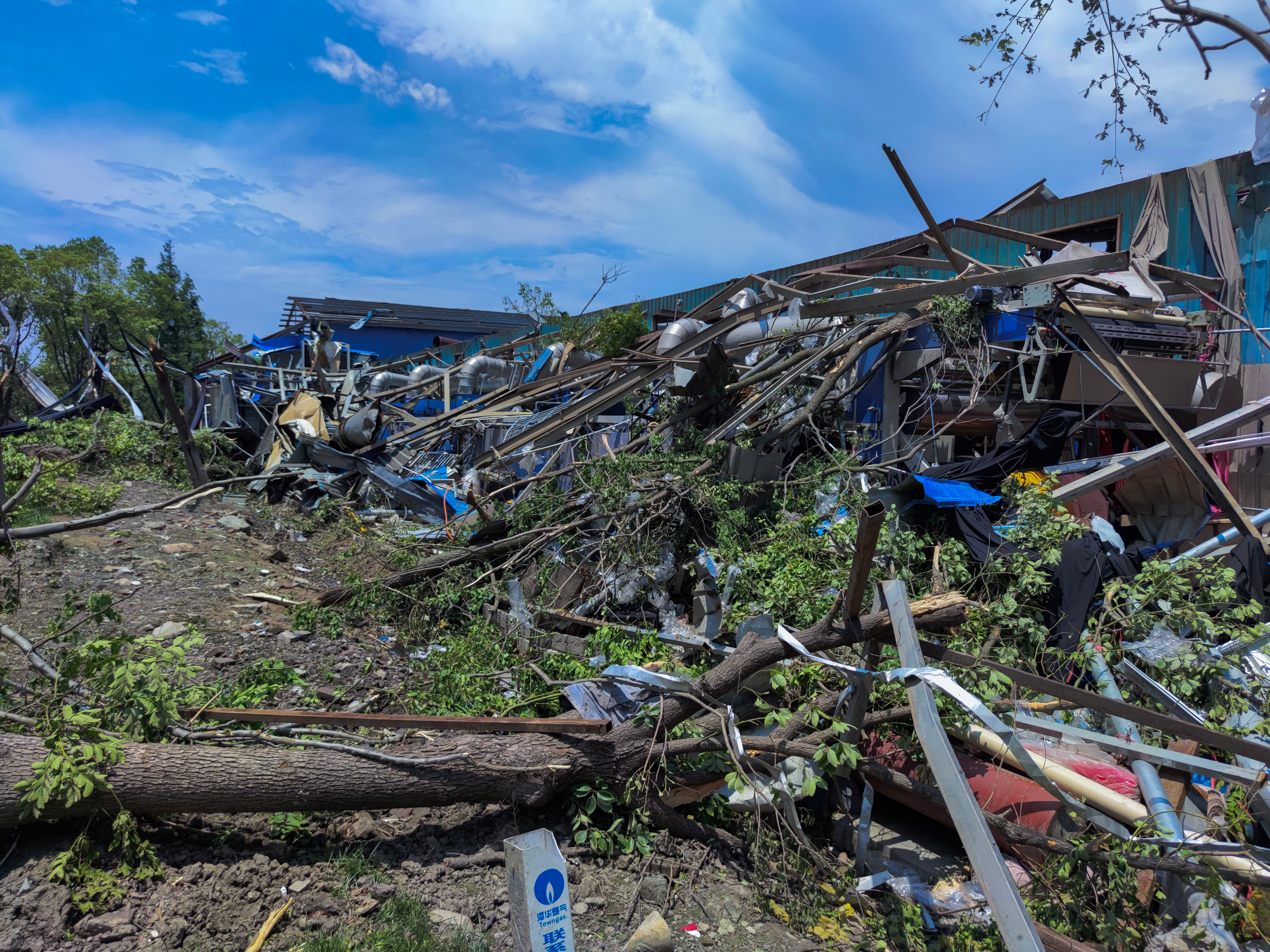
Damage from an EF3 tornado in Shengze, China in 2021

China experiences dozens of tornadoes each year, most often in the summer in the country's south, east, and northeast. Several tornadoes have been deadly, including the 2016 Funing tornado, which killed 98 people. In 2021, an outbreak of 13 tornadoes killed at least 12 people.

== Climatology ==
Dozens of tornadoes touch down in China each year, with an average of 44 based on a survey from 2003 to 2019. The country's areas most commonly affected are in the south, east, and northeast. Tornadoes most typically affect the country in the summer, with a peak in July, followed by August. The earliest event in a calendar year was 12 January, 1996, in Guangdong. The latest was on 20 December, 1977, in Inner Mongolia Province.

== Events ==
=== Pre-2000 ===
Event	Date	Area	Tornadoes	Casualties	Notes	Sources
Shanghai, China tornado outbreak	24 September 1956	Shanghai	3	68 fatalities, 842 injuries	Three tornadoes hit Shanghai, one of which was estimated at 100 metres (330 ft) wide. Numerous residential buildings were demolished, a 60-ton crane was toppled, and a 10-ton empty oil tank was thrown 120 metres (390 ft), wounding 5 people who were hiding inside. Elsewhere, 37 people were killed and 150 injured at the Shanghai Polytechnic University, where buildings were collapsed, including a 4-story building which was "cut in half" by the tornado.	
Hubei, China tornado	22 April 1958	Hanchuan, Hubei Province, China	–	133 fatalities	Tornado rated at least F3 on the Fujita scale.	
Shandong, China tornado	5 July 1958	Zaozhuang, Shandong Province, China	–	63 fatalities		
Hubei, China tornado	31 July 1964	Xiaogan, Hubei Province, China	–	82 fatalities		
Jiangsu, China tornado	3 March 1966	Yancheng, Jiangsu Province, China	–	74–87 fatalities	Tornado moved northeast and was over 1 kilometer wide. A total of 30 river vessels were left missing, and thousands of buildings were damaged. Tornado rated around F4 on the Fujita scale.	
Bazhou–Tianjin, China tornadoes	28–29 August 1969	Bazhou, Hebei Province, China–Tianjin	2	146 fatalities, >1,610 injuries	On 28 August, a tornado moved from the Hongqiao District to the Nankai District of Tianjin. Six boats were overturned and sank. On the following day, a tornado touched down near Chuhegang Village before moving into Tianjin, dissipating near the Finance and Economics School. The second tornado was much more intense - along the path, trees were uprooted, chimney stacks were toppled, and concrete factories were severely damaged or leveled. The auditorium of the Finance and Economics School was also destroyed. The two tornadoes killed 146 people, of which 52 died in Tianjin and 94 in Chu Hegang Village. Second tornado was rated a high-end F4 (an low-end F5 intensity is plausible) on the Fujita scale.	
Hubei, China tornado outbreak	16 April 1977	Hubei Province, China	≥3	118 fatalities, 1,100+ injuries	Three tornadoes touched down in Hubei Province. Xiaogan, Huangpi, and Huanggang counties were affected. Concrete buildings were destroyed by the tornadoes and numerous trees were uprooted. In Huanggang County, the auditorium of Zongluzui High School was destroyed during a movie viewing, killing 86 people and injuring hundreds. The Huanggang County tornado alone killed 103 people, and was rated at least F3 on the Fujita scale.	
Shaanxi, China tornado	14 April 1978	Xianyang, Shaanxi Province, China	1	84 fatalities, 334 injuries	A 15-minute, 300 metres (980 ft) wide tornado destroyed 90% of houses in Zhoucheng village. The tornado was rated EF3. The tornado path was about 7 kilometres (4.3 mi) long. A total of 945 houses were destroyed, and more than 6,000 trees were damaged.	
Hunan, China tornado	17 April 1979	Changde, Hunan Province, China	–	59 fatalities		
Hunan, China tornado	27 April 1983	Xiangyin County, Miluo City and Pingjiang County, Hunan Province, China	1	81 fatalities, 970 injuries	A large tornado affected several counties, leaving a trail of catastrophic destruction. Rated EF4, the tornado uprooted an ancient camphor tree with a diameter at breast height of 3.15 metres (10.3 ft), ripped a 110‑kV high‑tension power pole from the ground and hurled it 6 metres (20 ft) from its base, toppled an installed 50‑kVA transformer and carried it over 10 metres (33 ft), flattened a newly built single‑story brick‑and‑wood courtyard house covering more than 1,000 square metres (10,800 sq ft), and shattered a 60‑square‑metre (650 sq ft) concrete slab into pieces and swept them more than 100 metres (330 ft) away. Elsewhere along its path, the tornado collapsed 2,600 homes and "destroyed" more than 300,000 trees. Two school pupils died after being thrown over 300 metres (980 ft). Fish and shrimp were deposited in nearby mountains. The direct economic loss totaled 12.711 million yuan.	
Shanghai, China tornadoes	11 July 1986	Shanghai	4	31 fatalities, 168 injuries	Several tornadoes, described as being similar in strength to the ones in 1956, affected Shanghai. The tornadoes destroyed 4,800 buildings, 11 schools and 14 factories.	
Heilongjiang, China tornado outbreak	31 July 1987	Heilongjiang Province, China	10+	16 fatalities, 442 injuries	A tornado outbreak affected Heilongjiang Province. Fourteen counties and cities were affected. An EF4 tornadoes occurred across Hailun. Another EF4 tornado struck Keshan Farm, and an EF2 struck Baiquan County.	
Guangdong Province, China tornado	19 April 1995	Guangdong Province, China	–	7 fatalities		

=== 2000–09 ===
Event	Date	Area	Tornadoes	Casualties	Notes	Sources
South China tornado	20 April 2003	Tiaofeng Town of Leizhou City, Guangdong Province, China		29 injuries	Unclear how many houses destroyed since more houses are listed as destroyed than affected ("affected 423 homes and destroyed 793 houses"), and if that many houses were actually destroyed, the deaths and injuries may have been under-reported.	
Hong Kong Airport Tornado	20 May 2003	Hong Kong	1	None	A weak tornado struck Hong Kong International Airport.	
Hong Kong Airport Tornado	6 September 2004	Hong Kong	1	None	An anticyclonic tornado briefly touched down at the Hong Kong International Airport.	
Guangdong, China tornado	11 May 2005	Huilai County and Lufeng, Guangdong Province, China		6 fatalities, 100+ injuries	204 houses destroyed, 28,310 people affected, 31 million yuan in economic losses	
Jiangsu, China tornado	14 June 2005	Shuyang County, Jiangsu Province, China		7 fatalities, 223+ injuries	"Several hundred were injured", 194,487 houses destroyed, 825,000 people affected, 1.2 billion yuan in economic losses	
Hunan, China tornado	27 July 2005	Hengyang and Hengnan counties, Hunan Province, China		7 fatalities, 207 injuries	2,430 houses destroyed, 700 families homeless, some injuries caused by chemical leaks associated with the storm	
Anhui, China tornado	30 July 2005	Anhui Province, China		15 fatalities, 46 injuries	42.1 million yuan in economic losses	
Nanyang, Henan, China tornado	3 August 2005	20 townships, Nanyang city, Henan Province, China		2 fatalities, 35 injuries	15,000 trees uprooted, 136 million yuan in economic losses	
Guangdong, China tornado	11–15 August 2005	Qishi Township and 384 villages in Zhanjiang, Guangdong Province, China		3 fatalities, 195 injuries	20 people missing- unknown if found from news accounts	
Shanghai, China tornado	13 August 2005	Dongjie Village of Huangdu Town, Jiading, Qingpu and Baoshan districts, Shanghai, China		9 injuries	Caused power outage for 3,760 families and 124 businesses. Tornado also knocked down five high-voltage power lines, causing more widespread power outages.	
Guangdong, China tornado	8 September 2005	17 villages in Lianjiang City, Guangdong Province, China		None	No casualties, injuries unknown, 10,000 people affected, 480 houses destroyed, 12.8 million yuan in economic losses.	
Hainan, China tornado	27 September 2005	Lingao County, Hainan Province, China		6 fatalities, 15 injuries	6 houses destroyed, 70 others damaged	
Jiangsu, China tornado	29 November 2005	Suzhou, Jiangsu Province, China		6 fatalities, 52 injuries		
Anhui, China tornado	6 December 2005	Wuwei County, Anhui Province, China		16 fatalities, 162 injuries	715 houses destroyed, 24 million yuan in economic losses	
Guangdong, China tornado	1 March 2006	Leizhou City, Guangdong Province, China		9 injuries	510 houses destroyed.	
Shanghai, China tornado	13 March 2006	Pudong New Area, Shanghai, China		34 injuries		
Shenzhen, China tornado	27 March 2006	Longgang and Pingshan districts, Shenzhen, Guangdong Province, China		5 fatalities, 12 injuries		
Anhui, China tornado	29 June 2006	Sixian County, Anhui Province China		3 fatalities, 46 injuries	Deaths from the collapse of a school roof on students.	
Southeast China tornado	3 July 2007	Gaoyou City, Jiangsu Province and Tianchang City, Anhui Province, China		14 fatalities, 151 injuries		
Zhejiang, China tornado	18 August 2007	Wenzhou, Zhejiang Province, China		11 fatalities, 62 injuries	156 houses destroyed.	
Heilongjiang, China tornado	25 May 2008	Wuchang City, Heilongjiang Province, China		1 fatality, 36 injuries	F2 tornado and hailstorm hit 7 towns. A total of 433 houses damaged.	
Guangdong, China tornado	6 June 2008	Wuchuan, Guangdong, China		20 injuries		
Anhui, China tornado	20 June 2008	Lingbi County, Anhui Province, China		1 fatality, 49 injuries	650 houses destroyed and 960 damaged, 950 people relocated.	
East China Sea tornado	5 July 2008	East China Sea, China		3 fatalities	Fishing boat capsized, 4 people still missing	
Jiangsu, China tornado	30 July 2008	Linze Town, Jiangsu Province, China		4 fatalities, 90+ injuries	Associated with Tropical Storm Fung-wong, 751,600 people were evacuated in advance	

=== 2010s ===
Event	Date	Area	Tornadoes	Casualties	Notes	Sources
Chongqing, China tornado	6 May 2010	Dianjiang and Liangping counties, Chongqing Municipality, China		39 fatalities, 200 injuries		
Heilongjiang, China tornado	15 May 2010	Suihua City, Heilongjiang Province, China		7 fatalities, 98 injuries		
Jiangxi, China tornado	20 July 2010	Yongxiu County, Jiangxi Province, China		Unknown	Unknown mortality and damages from news article found.	
Guangdong, China tornado	2 May 2011	Dabu Town of Ruyuan Yao Nationality Autonomous County, Guangdong Province China		None	1 house destroyed, 53 damaged, injuries unknown.	
Hunan, China tornado	9 May 2012	Lianyuan, Hunan Province, China		4 fatalities, 30 injuries	5,000 people in the area forced to relocate, up to 1,000 collapsed houses.	
Jiangxi, China tornado	17–22 July 2012	Yunsyu County, Jiangxi Province and Anhui Province, China		1 fatality, numerous injuries	Total loss of life and property unclear from the news report. Number of wounded unclear from article. A total of 580,000 people affected by severe weather.	
Guangxi, China tornado	17 April 2013	Qixing District, Guilin and Rong'an County, Liuzhou, Guangxi Zhuang Autonomous Region, China		8 injuries		
Hunan, China tornado	20 March 2013	Dao County, Hunan Province, China		3 fatalities, 52 injuries		
Guangdong, China tornado	21 March 2013	Fujian Province and Dongguan, Guangdong Province, China		24 fatalities, 148 injuries	Capsized a river ferry, killing 11; 215,000 people in the area forced to relocate because of severe weather.	
Jiangsu & Anhui, China tornado	7 July 2013	Yuhu Village, Gaoyou City and Yizheng City, Jiangsu Province, and Tianchang City, Anhui Province, China		49 injuries	500 houses damaged, some rows of houses completely leveled to foundations.	
Foshan City, China tornado	4 October 2015	Shunde District, Foshan City, Guangdong Province, China		3 fatalities, 80 injuries	Associated with Typhoon Mujigae.	
Jiangxi, China tornado	16 April 2016	Yichin City and Shangu Town, Jing'an County and Gao'an County, Jiangxi Province, China		None	258 houses damaged, 27 million yuan in damages.	
Jiangsu tornado	23 June 2016	Yancheng, Jiangsu Province, China	≥2	99 fatalities, 846 injuries	An EF4 tornado accompanied by a hailstorm killed at least 98 people and injured 846 others. The same supercell later produced a second tornado that killed one person	

=== 2020s ===
Event	Date	Area	Tornadoes	Casualties	Notes	Sources
Wuhan tornado outbreak	14-15 May 2021	Wuhan	≥13	15 fatalities, 400 injuries	At least 12 people were killed and hundreds were injured in a major tornado outbreak across the Wuhan and Jiangsu provinces of China. At least one EF3 tornado was confirmed.	
	23 February 2026	Zunyi, Guizhou			A tornado was reported at 8:20 UTC.	
	27 April 2026	Wuchuan, Zhanjiang, Guangdong			A tornado was reported at 5:30 UTC.	
	3 May 2026	Xuwen, Guangdong			A landspout was reported at 4:30 UTC.	
	12 May 2026	Zhangping, Longyan, Fujian			A tornado touched down at 8:00 UTC, which carried away the plastic film from several greenhouses.	
	13 May 2026	Fengkai, Guangdong			A landspout was reported at 6:50 UTC.	
	14 May 2026	Huilai, Guangdong			A tornado was reported at 8:00 UTC.	
	23 May 2026	Heilongjiang, Guangdong	2	9 injuries	An EF2 tornado touched down at 7:00 UTC in Mingshui, which caused intensive damages to homes and buildings, with roofs sustaining partial roof loss. Several solar panels were also damaged. Around 26,000 trees were toppled. Approximately 313 homes were damaged across three towns in Mingshui County, with Yulin Township suffering the heaviest damage. An EF1 tornado touched down at 9:00 UTC in Conghua, Guangzhou, which flattened the second floor of a temporary construction-site building and uprooted several trees.	
	31 May 2026	Songyuan, Jilin			A tornado was reported at 7:00 UTC.	
	5 June 2026	Yuanzhou, Ningxia			A tornado blew away corrugated iron sheets when it touched down at 9:20 UTC.	
	6 June 2026	Yuanzhou, Ningxia	2		A tornado was reported at 6:00 UTC in Yilan, Heilongjiang. At 7:20 UTC, a landspout was reported at Qian Gorlos, Jilin. There was also a waterspout near Futian, Guangdong at 2:00 UTC.	
	7 June 2026	Xingning, Guangxi			At 9:10 UTC, A brief tornado peeled off the roof of a building.	
	12 June 2026	Xingning, Guangxi			At 4:00 UTC, a tornado was reported.	
	16 June 2026	Zhangbei, Hebei			At 5:52 UTC, an EF2 tornado damaged several structures including greenhouses, homes, and utility poles. Some trees were snapped, others toppled completely. Brick roof tiles on homes sustained partial damages and corrugated iron sheets were blown away.	
	17 June 2026	Zhaoyuan, Heilongjiang			At 9:20 UTC, a landspout was reported.	
	22 June 2026	Heilongjiang, Inner Mongolia, Hebei	4		At 1:40 UTC, a landspout and a tornado were reported in Raohe. At 6:00 UTC, a tornado touched down in Wengniute Banner, which lifted the roof of a building and knocked over a brick wall. At 7:00 UTC, a tornado was reported in Zhangbei.	
	24 June 2026	Fujin City, Jiamusi, Heilongjiang			At 5:20 UTC, a landspout was reported.	
Tropical Storm Maysak	4-6 July 2026	Southeastern China	3	12 fatalities, >331 injuries	12 people were killed by 2 separate tornadoes, the deadliest was a preliminary rated EF3 in Huanggang City, Hubei, killing 10 and injuring over 331 others. Another killer EF3 tornado was also reported in Daye, Hubei with 2 additional fatalities.	
	July 12, 2026 Zhalantun, Hulunbuir, |Inner Mongolia					
	Aksay Kazakh Autonomous County, Gansu & Zhenglan Banner, Inner Mongolia	July 17, 2026		2		Two landspouts were reported.
	Zhejiang, Liaoning	July 17, 2026		2		Two tornadoes were reported.
	Tianjin	July 26, 2026				A tornadoe was reported.
	Hainan	July 27, 2026				A tornadoes was reported.
	Yunan and Heilongjiang	July 28, 2026	2			Two tornadoes were reported.
	Hebei	AJuly 31, 2026				A tornado was reported.
	Heilongjiang	August 3, 2026				A tornado was reported.
	Heilongjiang	August 5, 2026				A tornado was reported.
Typhoon Dolphin (2026)	Zhejiang	August 10, 2026	2			In Jiaojiang, a tornado scatted corrugated iron sheets and toppled a moped. In Wenling, Taizhou, a tornado scattered debris.
	Shandong, Qinghai	August 16, 2026	2			A tornado and a landspout were reported.
	Heilongjiang	August 19, 2026				A tornado was reported.
	Inner Mongolia	August 20, 2026	4			Four landspouts were reported.
	Shaanxi	August 22, 2026				A landspout was reported.
	Heilongjiang	August 23, 2026				A landspout was reported.
	Liaoning	August 24, 2026				In Zhuanghe, Dalian, a tornado blew away corrugated iron sheets.
	Heilongjiang	August 25, 2026				A tornado was reported.
	Hainan	September 14, 2026	2			In Wanning, a tornado toppled small trees and a gasoline pump. A tornado was also reported in Qionghai.
	Jilin	October 15, 2026			A landspout was reported.	
	Yunnan	November 1, 2026			A tornado was reported.	

== See also ==
- List of Asian tornadoes and tornado outbreaks
- China tropical cyclone rainfall climatology
