= 2016 Funing tornado =

2016 tornado in Jiangsu, China

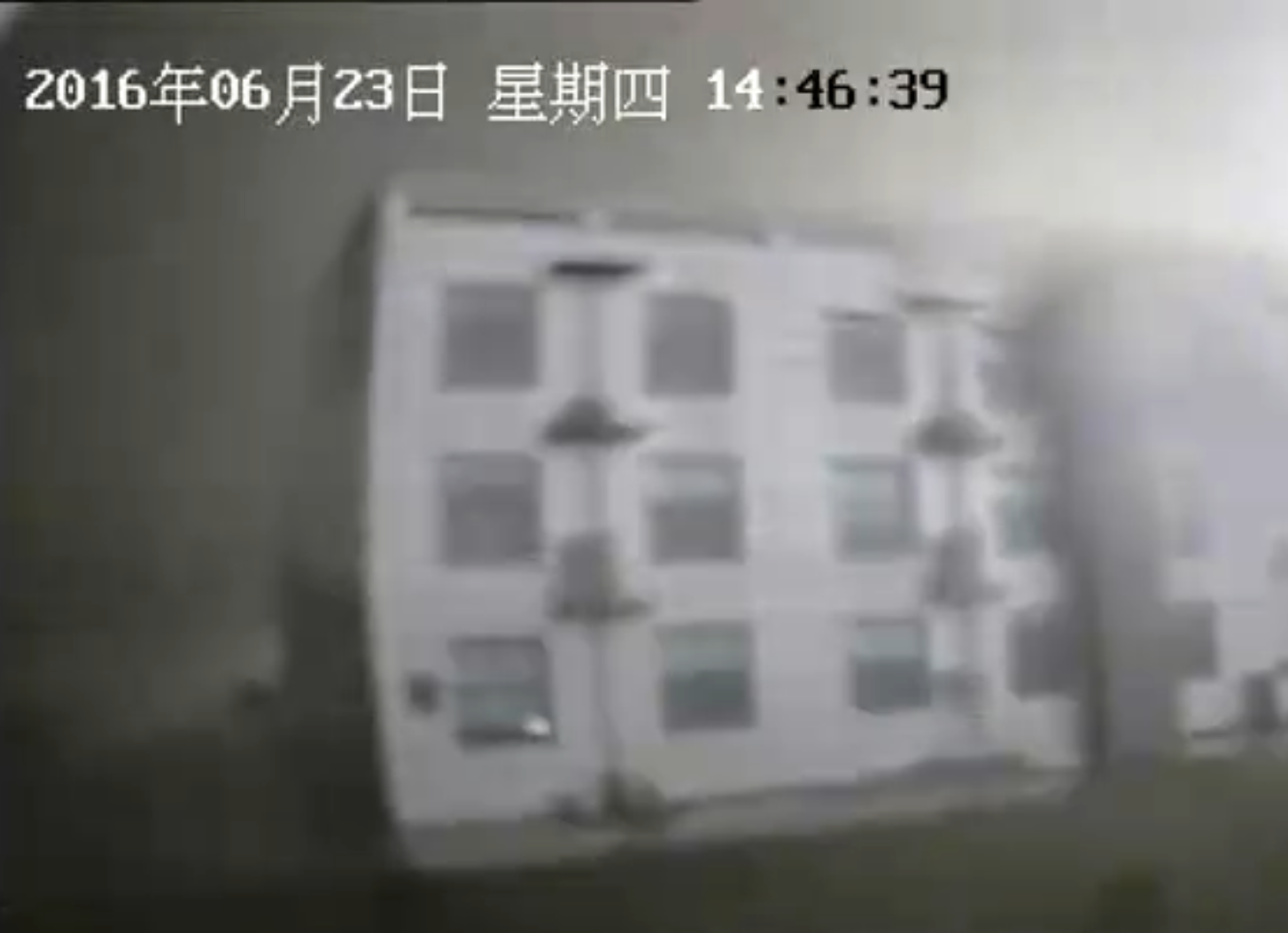
- Tornado captured by surveillance cameras

Meteorological history
- Formed: 23 June 2016 ≈ 2:30 p.m. (UTC+8:00)
- Duration: 50 minutes

EF4 tornado
- on the Enhanced Fujita scale
- Max width: 4.1 km (4,500 yd; 2.5 mi)
- Path length: 34.5 km (21.4 mi)
- Highest winds: 267–322 km/h (166–200 mph)

Overall effects
- Fatalities: 98
- Injuries: 846
- Damage: $760 million (2016 USD)
- Areas affected: Jiangsu (Funing and Sheyang Counties)
- Part of the tornado outbreaks of 2016

On the afternoon of June 23, 2016, a severe thunderstorm produced an extremely large, deadly and violent tornado over the province of Jiangsu, China. Striking areas northeast of Yancheng around 2:30 p.m. local time, the tornado killed 98 people and injured 846 others (152 critically). The China Meteorological Administration later rated the tornado as an EF4 on the Enhanced Fujita scale. Another tornado spawned by the same supercell killed one person in the Sheyang area.

The Jiangsu tornado is the widest tornado in China's history since records and documentation began in 1950.

== Background ==
During the late spring and early summer, a semi-permanent frontal boundary—called the meiyu front—emerges across eastern China, Taiwan, and Japan. This feature leads to prolonged periods of heavy rain and thunderstorms which frequently cause damage. Rainfall along this boundary tends to be particularly heavy in post-El Niño summers, such as the summer of 2016. On June 23, 2016, a band of intense thunderstorms roughly 970 km (600 mi) across developed along the meiyu front in eastern China. One particular storm complex over Jiangsu Province spanned 400 to 480 km (250 to 300 mi) and produced a tornado near Yancheng around 2:30 p.m. local time (0630 UTC). The tornado was accompanied by a hailstorm. Damage analysis found damage consistent with EF4 intensity, and the China Meteorological Administration rated the tornado as an EF4, with maximum sustained winds greater than 240 feet per second, or 165 mph (266 km/h).

== Impact ==
The tornado carved a wide path of destruction through the Funing area of Yancheng in Jiangsu province, at one point reaching a peak width of 4.1 km wide (2.55 miles). The tornado first touched down in the village of Banhuzen, and then left behind catastrophic damage as it impacted areas in and around the villages of Laowangcun, Jiqiaocun, Dalaocun, Xuejiagang, Beichencun, and Lixingqiao, all located west of or along the southern fringes of downtown Funing. East of Funing, the tornado caused damage in the village of Wutanzhen before dissipating. Thousands of well-built masonry-construction homes were heavily damaged or destroyed along the path, with many completely leveled. Manufacturing plants, businesses, and rice mills suffered from similar destruction, and multiple large factory buildings were severely damaged at a Canadian Solar plant. Two large school buildings were heavily damaged as well, and multiple large, multi-ton metal shipping containers were lofted and thrown hundreds of yards by the tornado. Structural debris was scattered long distances throughout the damage path, many vehicles were tossed hundreds of yards and mangled; trees were completely denuded and debarked; and numerous metal power line pylons and truss towers were bent and crumpled to the ground. Wind speeds of up to 125 kilometers per hour (78 mph) were measured at a weather station in Funing as the tornado passed near the area. First responders reported bodies strewn across devastated communities. Damages were calculated at nearly CN¥5 billion (US$760 million).

As the supercell continued past Funing, it produced another tornado of unknown intensity that destroyed several buildings and killed one person in the Sheyang area.

=== Response ===
A total of 99 people were killed by the two tornadoes, and 846 others were injured, including 152 in critical condition. China's news service, Xinhua, called the event one of the deadliest disasters to hit Jiangsu in decades, and the deadliest tornado to hit China in half a century. Communist Party General Secretary Xi Jinping and Premier Li Keqiang requested "all-out rescue efforts" to aid victims and survivors. Hundreds of residents were left trapped in rubble. The event was declared a national-level disaster. Disaster response teams were deployed from Beijing that evening, providing 1,000 tents, 2,000 beds, and floodlights.

== Other tornadoes ==
Confirmed tornadoes by Enhanced Fujita rating
EFU	EF0	EF1	EF2	EF3	EF4	EF5	Total
1	0	0	0	0	0	0	2

List of confirmed tornadoes – Thursday, June 23, 2016 (Note: All dates are based on the local time zone where the tornado touched down; however, all times are in Coordinated Universal Time for consistency.)
EF#	Location	County / Parish	State	Start Coord.	Time (UTC)	Path length	Max width	Summary
EFU	Sheyang	Sheyang	Jiangsu	N/A	15:10–15:30	N/A	N/A	1 death – Another tornado was spawned from the same supercell about twenty minutes after the first tornado, destroying several structures.

== See also ==
- List of China tornadoes
