= Renmin, Heilongjiang =

Renmin 任民镇
- Town
- Location in Heilongjiang Renmin (China)
- Coordinates: 46°38′7″N 125°32′39″E
- Country: People's Republic of China
- Province: Heilongjiang
- Prefecture-level city: Suihua
- County-level city: Anda
- Time zone: UTC+8 (China Standard)

Renmin (Chinese: 任民; pinyin: Rénmín) is a town under the administration of Anda, Heilongjiang, China. As of 2020, it administers four residential neighborhoods and the following 11 villages:

- Renmin Village
- Yongsheng Village (永生村)
- Heli Village (合力村)
- Qingfeng Village (庆丰村)
- Yongping Village (永平村)
- Yixin Village (一心村)
- Yumin Village (裕民村)
- Gongnong Village (工农村)
- Heping Village (和平村)
- Xinyi Village (新义村)
- Qingmin Village (清民村)
