= Sanhe, Heilongjiang =

Sanhe 三河镇
- Town
- Location in Heilongjiang Sanhe (China)
- Coordinates: 47°00′19″N 127°17′20″E
- Country: People's Republic of China
- Province: Heilongjiang
- Prefecture-level city: Suihua
- District: Beilin
- Village-level divisions: 16 villages
- Elevation: 195 m (640 ft)
- Time zone: UTC+8 (China Standard)
- Area code: 0455

Sanhe (Chinese: 三河; pinyin: Sānhé; lit. 'three rivers') is a town of Beilin District, Suihua, Heilongjiang, People's Republic of China, located 46 kilometres (29 mi) northeast of downtown Suihua. As of 2018, it has six villages under its administration.

== See also ==
- List of township-level divisions of Heilongjiang
