= Tiexi Subdistrict (Anda) =

Subdistrict of Anda, Heilongjiang, China

Coordinates: 46°23′47.2″N 125°18′53″E

- Traditional Chinese: 鐵西街道
- Simplified Chinese: 铁西街道
Transcriptions
Standard Mandarin
- Hanyu Pinyin: Tiěxī jiēdào
Wu
- Romanization: thih si ka dau
Yue: Cantonese
- Jyutping: tit3 sai1 gaai1 dou6

Tiexi Subdistrict is the subdistrict of Anda, Suihua, Heilongjiang, China. The subdistrict office at Second Street of Tiexi (铁西二道街). The subdistrict is east to Caoqiao (草桥), Xinfadi (新发地), south to Yangcao (羊草), Nanlai (南来). The area of subdistrict is 50.28 km², the shape of subdistrict is rectangle in east-west direction, it has inhabitants 94993.

== Name ==
Tiexi is meaning "the west of railway", the railway is Harbin-Manzhouli railway. Anda railway station is located to the north of Tiexi, and there are three highway running through the subdistrict: Mingshen (明沈) highway, Anchang (安昌) highway, and Hadabao (哈大葆) highway.

== Sub-divide ==
Tiexi has six neighbourhoods:

- Neighbourhoods: Hongxing (红星), Longhua (龙化), Changzheng (长征), Shuichang (水厂), Dongfeng (东风), Tianqiao (天桥)
