= Lanxi =

Lanxi may refer to the following locations in China:

- Lanxi, Zhejiang (兰溪市), county-level city of Jinhua
- Lanxi County (兰西县), Suihua, Heilongjiang
  - Lanxi, Heilongjiang (兰西镇; zh), town in and seat of Lanxi County
- Lanxi, Fujian (蓝溪镇; zh), town in and subdivision of Shanghang County
- Lanxi, Yiyang (兰溪镇; zh), a town in Heshan District, Yiyang, Hunan
- Lanxi, Hubei (兰溪镇; zh), subdivision of Xishui County, Hubei
- Lanxi Yao Ethnic Township (兰溪瑶族乡; zh), subdivision of Jiangyong County, Hunan
