= Yulin Township, Heilongjiang =

Yulin Township 育林乡
- Township
- Location in Heilongjiang Yulin Township (China)
- Coordinates: 47°7′49″N 125°37′54″E
- Country: People's Republic of China
- Province: Heilongjiang
- Prefecture-level city: Suihua
- County: Mingshui County
- Time zone: UTC+8 (China Standard)

Yulin Township (simplified Chinese: 育林乡; traditional Chinese: 育林鄉; pinyin: Yùlín Xiāng) is a township under the administration of Mingshui County, Heilongjiang, China. As of 2018, it has 7 villages under its administration.
