= Dongjin, Heilongjiang =

Dongjin 东津镇
- Town
- Location in Heilongjiang Dongjin (China)
- Coordinates: 46°44′26″N 127°12′34″E
- Country: People's Republic of China
- Province: Heilongjiang
- Prefecture-level city: Suihua
- District: Beilin
- Village-level divisions: 1 residential community 8 villages
- Elevation: 192 m (630 ft)
- Time zone: UTC+8 (China Standard)
- Area code: 0455

Dongjin (simplified Chinese: 东津; traditional Chinese: 東津; pinyin: Dōngjīn; lit. 'east ford') is a town of Beilin District, Suihua, Heilongjiang, People's Republic of China, located 22 kilometres (14 mi) northeast of downtown Suihua and along China National Highway 222. As of 2011, it has one residential community (居委会) and eight villages under its administration.

== See also ==
- List of township-level divisions of Heilongjiang
