= Beilin District, Suihua =

Beilin 北林区 · 북림구
- District
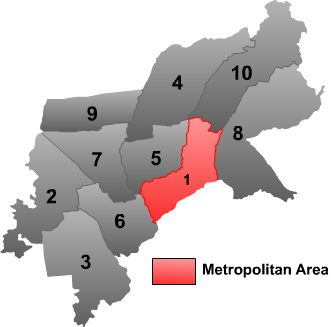
- Beilin District (red) in Suihua City

- Location in Heilongjiang
- Coordinates (Beilin District government): 46°38′14″N 126°59′07″E
- Country: China
- Province: Heilongjiang
- Prefecture-level city: Suihua
- Township-level divisions: 6 subdistricts 12 towns 8 townships
- District seat: Dayou Subdistrict

Area
  - Total: 359 km^{2} (139 sq mi)
- Elevation: 173 m (568 ft)

Population (2020 census)
  - Total: 698,025
  - Density: 1,940/km^{2} (5,040/sq mi)
- Time zone: UTC+8 (China Standard)
- Postal code: 152000
- Area code: 0455
- Website: www.hljbeilin.gov.cn

Beilin (Chinese: 北林; pinyin: Běilín; lit. 'northern forest') is the only district of the city of Suihua, Heilongjiang, China.

== Administrative divisions ==
There are 12 subdistricts, 15 towns, 3 townships and 2 ethnic townships in the district:

12 subdistricts

- Zilai Subdistrict (紫来街道)
- Ailu Subdistrict (爱路街道)
- Dayou Subdistrict (大有街道)
- Jitai Subdistrict (吉泰街道)
- Dongxing Subdistrict (东兴街道)
- Beilin Subdistrict (北林街道)
- Chaoxu Subdistrict (朝旭街道)
- Chunlei Subdistrict (春雷街道)
- Beichen Subdistrict (北辰街道)
- Kangzhuang Subdistrict (康庄街道)
- Xianfeng Subdistrict (先锋街道)
- Dongcheng Subdistrict (东城街道)

3 townships

- Liangang Township (连岗乡)
- Xinhua Township (新华乡)
- Wuying Township (五营乡)

2 ethnic townships

- Hongqi Manchu Ethnic Township (红旗满族乡, Manchu: ᠶᠣᠩ ᠠᠨ ᠮᠠᠨᠵᡠ ᡠᡴᠰᡠᡵᠠ ᠵᡝᠨ)
- Xinghe Korean Ethnic Township (兴和朝鲜族乡, Korean: 흥화조선족향)

15 towns

- Baoshan (宝山镇)
- Suisheng Manchu (绥胜满族镇)
- Xichangfa (西长发镇)
- Yong'an Manchu (永安满族镇)
- Taipingchuan (太平川镇)
- Qinjia (秦家镇)
- Shuanghe (双河镇)
- Sanhe (三河镇)
- Sifangtai (四方台镇)
- Jinhe (津河镇)
- Zhangwei (张维镇)
- Dongjin (东津镇)
- Dongfu (东富镇)
- Xingfu (兴福镇)
- Sanjing (三井镇)
