= Hailun =

Hailun 海伦市 Hai-lun
- County-level city
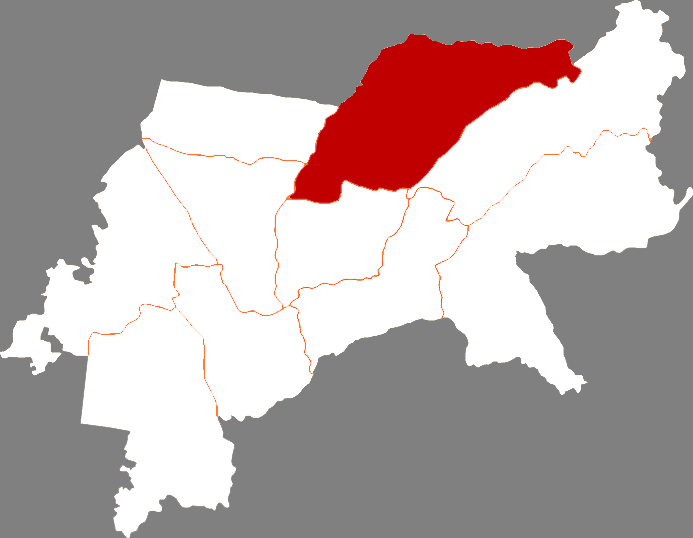
- Location of the city

- Location in Heilongjiang
- Coordinates: 47°28′N 126°58′E
- Country: People's Republic of China
- Province: Heilongjiang
- Prefecture-level city: Suihua
- Municipal seat: Hailun Town (海伦镇)

Area
  - Total: 4,667 km^{2} (1,802 sq mi)
- Elevation: 239 m (784 ft)

Population (2018)
  - Total: 756,616
  - Density: 162.1/km^{2} (419.9/sq mi)
- Time zone: UTC+8 (China Standard)
- Postal code: 152300
- Area code: 0455
- Climate: Dwa

Hailun (simplified Chinese: 海伦; traditional Chinese: 海倫; pinyin: Hǎilún) is a city in west-central Heilongjiang province, People's Republic of China. Administratively, it is a county-level city under Suihua City.

== History ==
=== Before the Qing dynasty ===
Hailun was one of the earliest centrally governed counties in Heilongjiang Province. The city was named after the Hailun River, which runs through it. The name Hailun is a variation of a Manchu word that sounds like "kailing", which means "otter". This name was chosen due to the abundance of otters inhabiting the nearby river. The area around Hailun was initially ruled by the Manchu people and was administrated from Hulan City for much of the Manchu Qing dynasty.

=== Qing dynasty ===
By 1885 (the eleventh ruling year of the Emperor Guangxu of the Qing dynasty), Hailun was administrated by the prefecture-level city of Suihua. In 1898, the Tongken Deputy Metropolitan Government was established, and the territory of Hailun County was placed under its jurisdiction. The Tongken Deputy Metropolitan Government was dissolved in 1906.

=== Republic of China ===
In 1912, Republic of China's first year in power, Hailun Prefecture was renamed to Hailun County. In 1932, following the Japanese annexation of Manchuria, Hailun County was absorbed into the Japanese puppet state of Manchukuo. On August 15, 1945, Manchukuo was liberated by the Soviet Red Army, and the puppet state was disestablished. The region was then handed over to the People’s Liberation Army under Mao Zedong. Led by the Chinese Communist Party, the People's Government was established in Manchuria in November 1945. Hailun County was under the direct jurisdiction of the CCP and the PLA until the founding of the People's Republic of China in 1949.

=== People's Republic of China ===
Since the founding of the People's Republic of China in 1949, Hailun County has been under the jurisdiction of Heilongjiang Province. On December 23, 1989, the State Council approved the renaming of Hailun County to Hailun City (county level).The name change did not affect the administrative jurisdiction under the city, and it was still governed through the Suihua District. On January 11, 1990, the area was officially renamed.

== Geography and climate ==
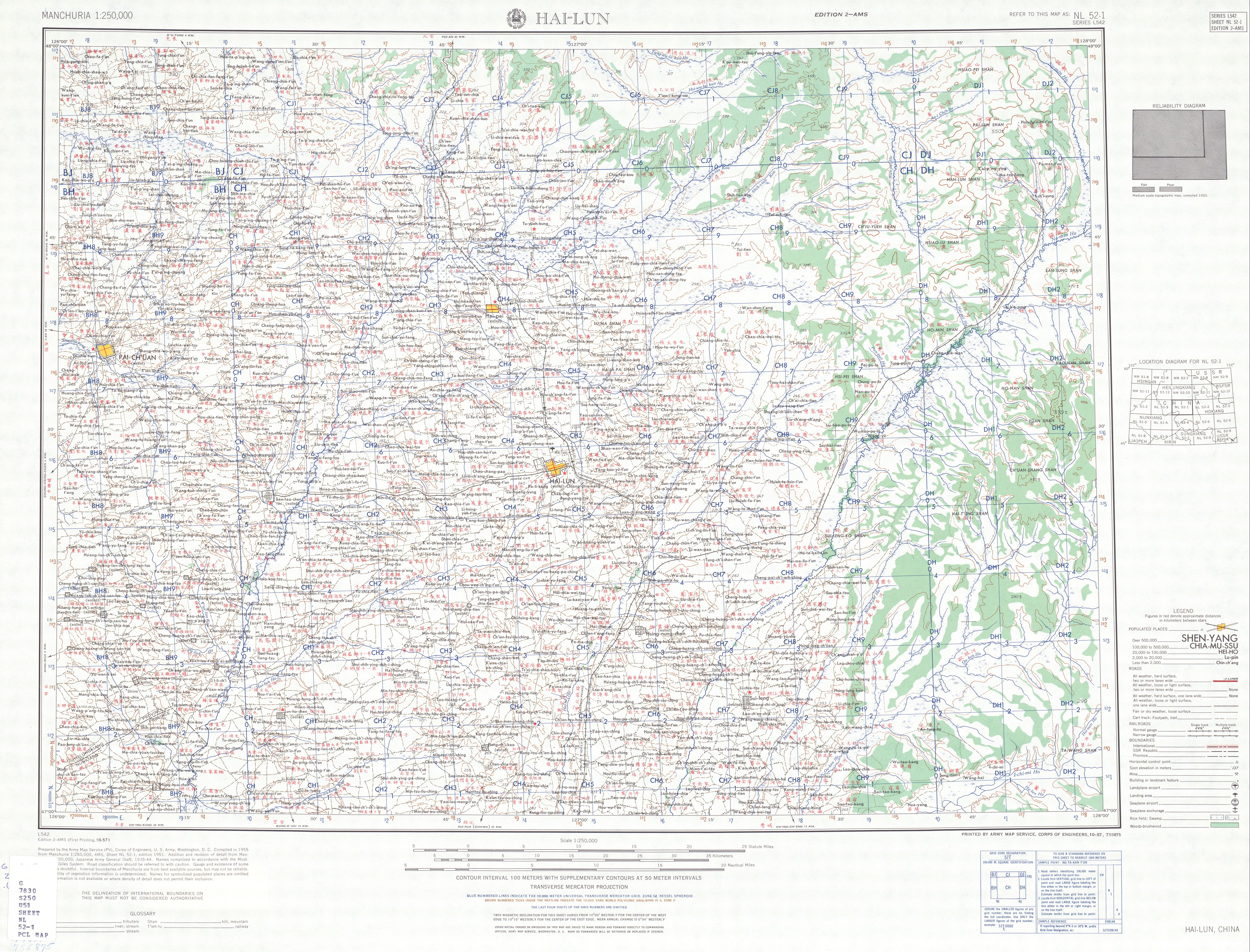
Map featuring Hailun (labeled 海倫 HAI-LUN (walled)) (AMS, 1955)

Hailun is located on the Songnen Plain with the Lesser Khingan mountain range to the west. Its administrative area ranges in latitude from 46° 58' to 47° 52' N, and in longitude from 126° 14' to 127° 45' E.

Hailun has a humid continental climate (Köppen: Dwa), with long, cold, and dry winters and humid, hot summers. The daily mean temperature in January, the coldest month, is −21.0 °C (−5.8 °F). The daily mean temperature in July, the warmest month, is 22.2 °C (72.0 °F). The average annual temperature of Hailun is +2.7 °C (36.9 °F). Nearly two-thirds of the annual precipitation falls between June and August. With percent possible sunshine ranging from 52% in July to 68% in February, the city receives 2,570 hours of sunshine annually.

Climate data for Hailun, elevation 220 m (720 ft), (1991–2020 normals, extremes 1951–present)
Month	Jan	Feb	Mar	Apr	May	Jun	Jul	Aug	Sep	Oct	Nov	Dec	Year
Record high °C (°F)	−0.5 (31.1)	6.0 (42.8)	19.1 (66.4)	28.3 (82.9)	34.1 (93.4)	38.0 (100.4)	36.6 (97.9)	35.4 (95.7)	32.5 (90.5)	24.7 (76.5)	13.5 (56.3)	3.4 (38.1)	38.0 (100.4)
Mean daily maximum °C (°F)	−16.0 (3.2)	−9.8 (14.4)	0.3 (32.5)	11.7 (53.1)	20.3 (68.5)	25.4 (77.7)	26.9 (80.4)	25.1 (77.2)	20.0 (68.0)	10.3 (50.5)	−3.1 (26.4)	−13.9 (7.0)	8.1 (46.6)
Daily mean °C (°F)	−21.0 (−5.8)	−15.7 (3.7)	−5.3 (22.5)	5.7 (42.3)	14.0 (57.2)	19.8 (67.6)	22.2 (72.0)	20.1 (68.2)	13.9 (57.0)	4.6 (40.3)	−8.0 (17.6)	−18.5 (−1.3)	2.7 (36.8)
Mean daily minimum °C (°F)	−25.6 (−14.1)	−21.3 (−6.3)	−11.0 (12.2)	−0.2 (31.6)	7.6 (45.7)	14.3 (57.7)	17.7 (63.9)	15.6 (60.1)	8.3 (46.9)	−0.4 (31.3)	−12.4 (9.7)	−22.8 (−9.0)	−2.5 (27.5)
Record low °C (°F)	−40.3 (−40.5)	−36.6 (−33.9)	−32.0 (−25.6)	−16.0 (3.2)	−7.9 (17.8)	2.4 (36.3)	7.1 (44.8)	3.1 (37.6)	−5.0 (23.0)	−19.1 (−2.4)	−31.1 (−24.0)	−37.2 (−35.0)	−40.3 (−40.5)
Average precipitation mm (inches)	3.7 (0.15)	3.6 (0.14)	9.8 (0.39)	22.6 (0.89)	46.5 (1.83)	106.3 (4.19)	147.5 (5.81)	135.9 (5.35)	64.5 (2.54)	22.7 (0.89)	10.1 (0.40)	7.3 (0.29)	580.5 (22.87)
Average precipitation days (≥ 0.1 mm)	5.3	3.9	5.0	6.9	11.5	14.1	14.4	14.0	9.9	6.4	6.2	7.0	104.6
Average snowy days	8.0	5.7	7.0	3.3	0.2	0	0	0	0.1	2.9	8.0	9.3	44.5
Average relative humidity (%)	73	68	59	53	53	66	79	80	70	63	68	74	67
Mean monthly sunshine hours	168.5	199.2	241.6	230.0	254.0	253.4	245.5	239.9	227.9	195.2	164.9	150.9	2,571
Percentage possible sunshine	61	68	65	56	54	53	52	55	61	59	60	58	59
Source: China Meteorological Administration All-time May Record

== Administrative divisions ==
Hailun City is divided into 14 towns and 9 townships.

14 towns

- Hailun (海伦镇), Haibei (海北镇), Lunhe (伦河镇), Gonghe (共合镇), Haixing (海兴镇), Xiangfu (祥富镇), Dongfeng (东风镇), Baixiang (百祥镇), Xiangrong (向荣镇), Yongfu (永富镇), Zhangfa (长发镇), Lianfa (联发镇), Qianjin (前进镇), Gongrong (共荣镇)

9 townships

- Donglin (东林乡), Hainan (海南乡), Leye (乐业乡), Fumin (福民乡), Fengshan (丰山乡), Yonghe (永和乡), Aimin (爱民乡), Zhayinhe (扎音河乡), Shuanglu (双录乡)
