= Anda, Heilongjiang =

Anda 安达市 An-ta
- County-level city
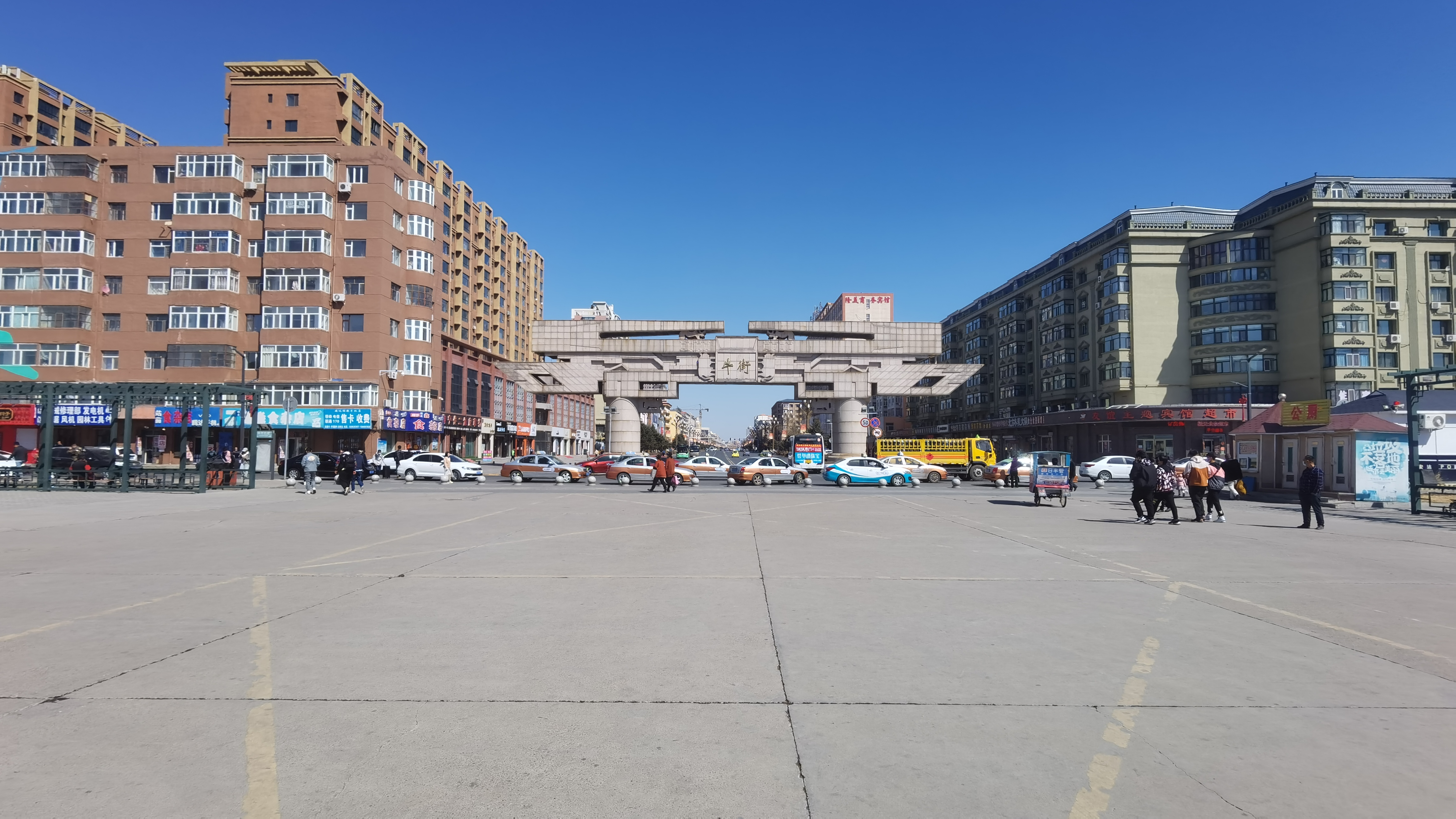

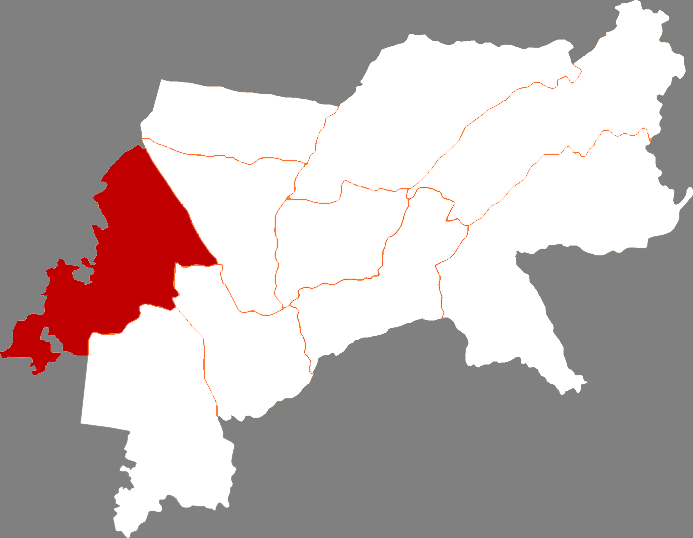
- Location of Anda City within Suihua

- Location in Heilongjiang
- Coordinates: 46.424°N 125.352°E
- Country: People's Republic of China
- Province: Heilongjiang
- Prefecture-level city: Suihua
- Township-level divisions: 4 subdistricts 10 towns 4 township

Area
  - Total: 3,586.3 km^{2} (1,384.7 sq mi)
- Elevation: 149 m (489 ft)

Population
  - Total: 472,826
  - Density: 131.84/km^{2} (341.47/sq mi)
- Time zone: UTC+8 (China Standard)
- Postal code: 151400
- Area code: 0455
- Climate: Dwa
- Website: www.hlanda.gov.cn

Anda (simplified Chinese: 安达; traditional Chinese: 安達; pinyin: Āndá) is a county-level city in western Heilongjiang province, People's Republic of China, located on the Harbin-Manzhouli Railway (formerly known as the Chinese Eastern Railway) about 30 kilometres (19 mi) southeast of Daqing and 110 km (68 mi) northwest of Harbin, capital of Heilongjiang, and is under the administration of Suihua City. Home to China's forage and dairy industries, more than 1,814 km^{2} (700 sq mi) out of Anda's 3,586 km^{2} (1,385 sq mi) total area is made up of grasslands.

== History ==
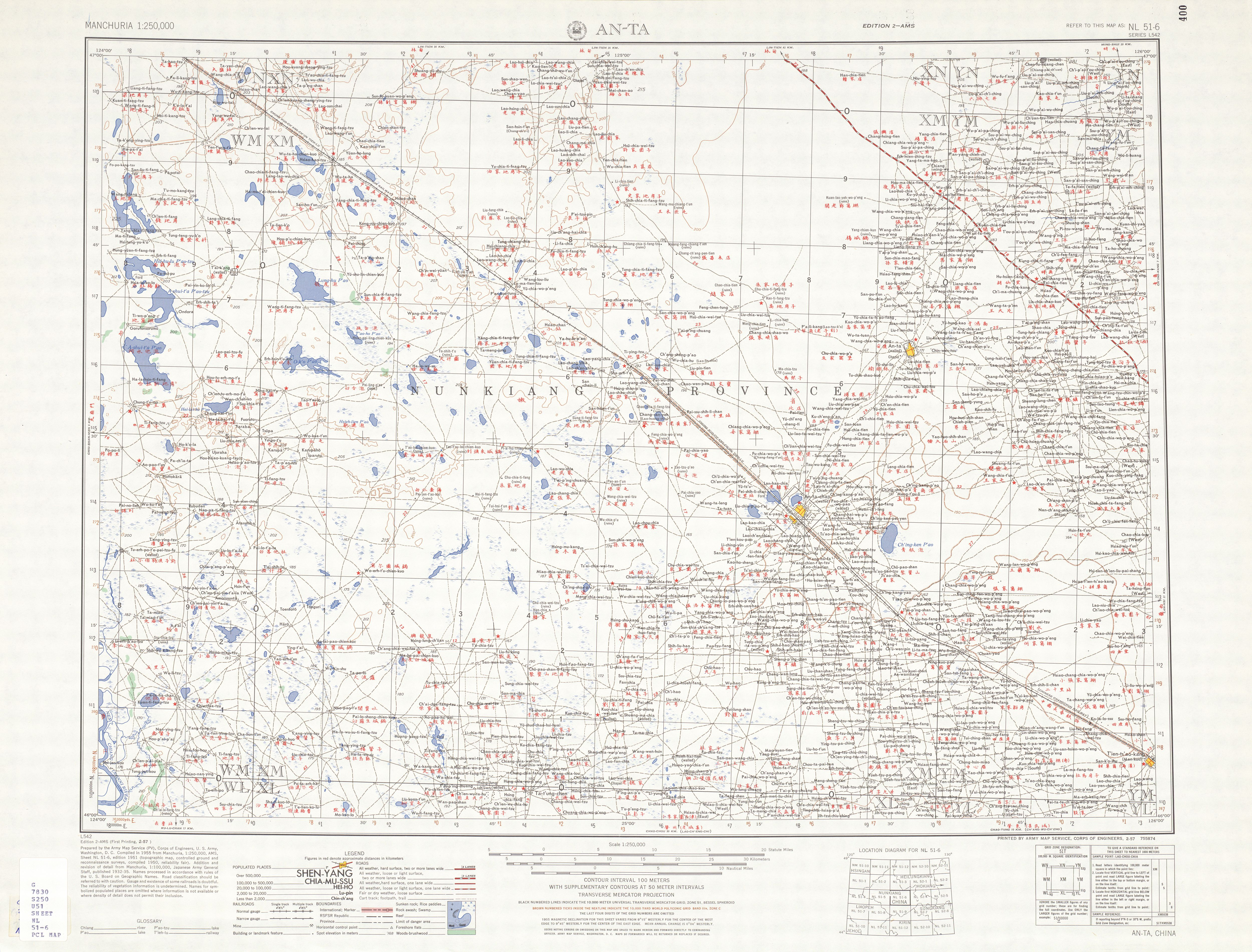
Map including Anda (labeled as 安達 An-ta (walled)) (AMS, 1955)

Archaeological sites in the area suggest human activities such as hunting and fishing in Anda can be traced back to 6000 years ago during the Neolithic Era.

== Climate ==
Anda has a monsoon-influenced humid continental climate (Köppen Dwa). The monthly 24-hour average temperature ranges from −18.7 °C (−1.7 °F) in January to 23.1 °C (73.6 °F) in July, and the annual mean is +4.19 °C (39.5 °F). A majority of the annual precipitation falls in July and August alone. With monthly percent possible sunshine ranging from 53% in July to 70% in February, the city receives 2,746 hours of bright sunshine annually.

Climate data for Anda, Heilongjiang, elevation 149 m (489 ft), (1991–2020 normals, extremes 1971–2010)
Month	Jan	Feb	Mar	Apr	May	Jun	Jul	Aug	Sep	Oct	Nov	Dec	Year
Record high °C (°F)	1.6 (34.9)	11.4 (52.5)	21.7 (71.1)	31.4 (88.5)	35.5 (95.9)	38.7 (101.7)	38.2 (100.8)	36.9 (98.4)	33.5 (92.3)	27.0 (80.6)	16.6 (61.9)	6.6 (43.9)	38.7 (101.7)
Mean daily maximum °C (°F)	−12.2 (10.0)	−6.1 (21.0)	3.1 (37.6)	13.7 (56.7)	21.7 (71.1)	26.7 (80.1)	28.4 (83.1)	26.7 (80.1)	21.4 (70.5)	12.1 (53.8)	−0.6 (30.9)	−10.4 (13.3)	10.4 (50.7)
Daily mean °C (°F)	−18.3 (−0.9)	−12.9 (8.8)	−3.2 (26.2)	7.4 (45.3)	15.4 (59.7)	21.1 (70.0)	23.5 (74.3)	21.6 (70.9)	15.3 (59.5)	6.1 (43.0)	−5.9 (21.4)	−15.9 (3.4)	4.5 (40.1)
Mean daily minimum °C (°F)	−23.2 (−9.8)	−18.7 (−1.7)	−9.2 (15.4)	0.9 (33.6)	9.1 (48.4)	15.5 (59.9)	18.9 (66.0)	16.9 (62.4)	9.6 (49.3)	0.8 (33.4)	−10.4 (13.3)	−20.4 (−4.7)	−0.8 (30.5)
Record low °C (°F)	−39.3 (−38.7)	−35.9 (−32.6)	−29.4 (−20.9)	−14.6 (5.7)	−6.9 (19.6)	2.4 (36.3)	8.0 (46.4)	4.5 (40.1)	−5.2 (22.6)	−16.6 (2.1)	−28.1 (−18.6)	−35.5 (−31.9)	−39.3 (−38.7)
Average precipitation mm (inches)	1.8 (0.07)	2.4 (0.09)	6.4 (0.25)	15.0 (0.59)	38.3 (1.51)	91.1 (3.59)	137.6 (5.42)	99.1 (3.90)	43.6 (1.72)	17.1 (0.67)	5.6 (0.22)	4.3 (0.17)	462.3 (18.2)
Average precipitation days (≥ 0.1 mm)	3.1	2.5	3.7	5.2	9.9	12.5	13.4	11.5	7.8	5.4	3.9	4.8	83.7
Average snowy days	6.1	4.4	5.0	1.9	0.1	0	0	0	0	1.6	5.3	7.7	32.1
Average relative humidity (%)	69	62	51	46	50	63	74	76	67	60	63	70	63
Mean monthly sunshine hours	175.7	203.7	246.4	240.4	259.4	252.6	233.6	230.9	231.2	203.1	163.3	155.2	2,595.5
Percentage possible sunshine	62	69	66	59	56	54	49	53	62	61	59	58	59
Source: China Meteorological Administration

== Administrative divisions ==
Anda administers four subdistricts, thirteen towns, and one townships.

Subdistricts:

- Xinxing Subdistrict (新兴街道), Tiexi Subdistrict (铁西街道), Anhong Subdistrict (安虹街道), Dongcheng Subdistrict (东城街道)

Towns:

- Anda (安达镇), Jixinggang (吉星岗镇), Renmin (任民镇), Laohugang (老虎岗镇), Zhongben (中本镇), Taipingzhuang (太平庄镇), Wanbaoshan (万宝山镇), Yangcao (羊草镇), Changde (昌德镇), Shengping (升平镇), Wolitun (卧里屯镇), Huoshishan (火石山镇), Gudahu (古大湖镇)

Townships:

- Xianyuan Township (先源乡)
