= Lanxi County =

Lanxi County 兰西县
- County
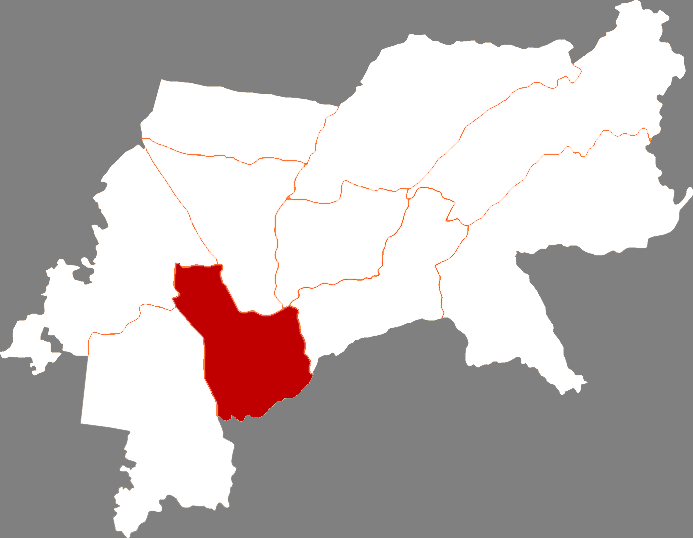

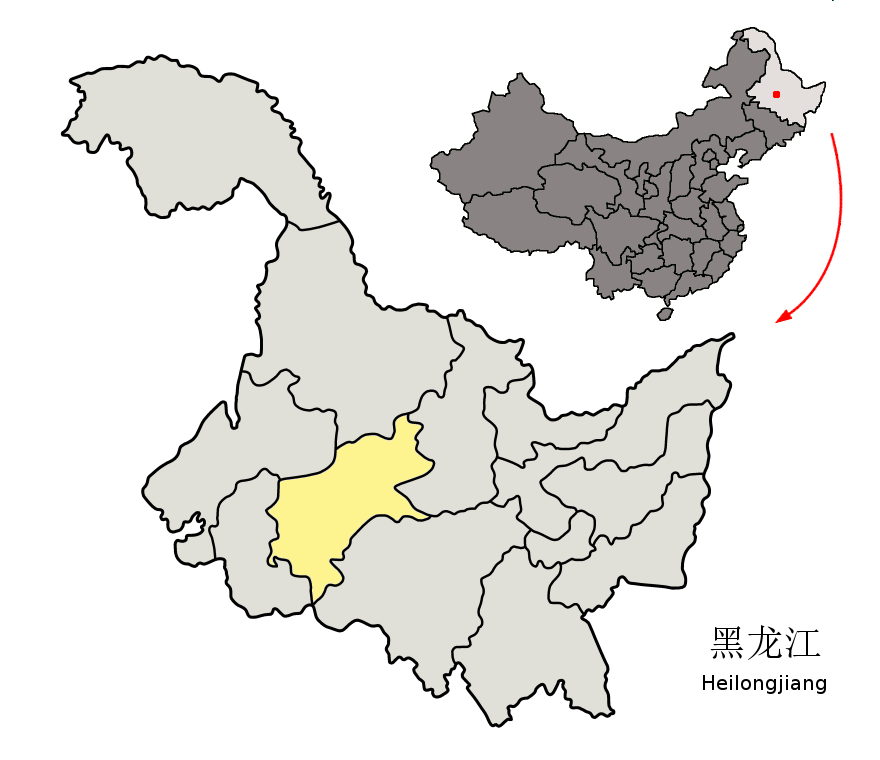
- Suihua in Heilongjiang
- Coordinates: 46°12′N 126°10′E
- Country: People's Republic of China
- Province: Heilongjiang
- Prefecture-level city: Suihua

Area
  - Total: 2,499.35 km^{2} (965.00 sq mi)

Population (2010)
  - Total: 424,562
  - Density: 169.869/km^{2} (439.959/sq mi)
- Time zone: UTC+8 (China Standard)

Lanxi County (simplified Chinese: 兰西县; traditional Chinese: 蘭西縣; pinyin: Lánxī Xiàn) is a county of western Heilongjiang province, People's Republic of China. It is under the jurisdiction of the prefecture-level city of Suihua.

== Administrative divisions ==
Lanxi County is divided into 4 subdistricts, 8 towns and 7 townships.

4 subdistricts

- Yanhe (颜河街道), Shunda (顺达街道), Lanya (兰亚街道), Zhengyang (正阳街道)

8 towns

- Lanxi (兰西镇), Yulin (临江镇), Linjiang (豆沙镇), Pingshan (平山镇), Hongguang (红光镇), Yuanda (远大镇), Kangrong (康荣镇), Liaoyuan (燎原镇)

7 townships

- Bei'an (北安乡), Changjiang (长江乡), Lanhe (兰河乡), Hongxing (红星乡), Zhanggang (长岗乡), Xinghuo (星火乡), Fendou (奋斗乡)

== Demographics ==
The population of the district was 466,725 in 1999.

== Climate ==
Climate data for Lanxi, elevation 169 m (554 ft), (1991–2020 normals, extremes 1981–2010)
Month	Jan	Feb	Mar	Apr	May	Jun	Jul	Aug	Sep	Oct	Nov	Dec	Year
Record high °C (°F)	0.1 (32.2)	9.3 (48.7)	21.1 (70.0)	30.0 (86.0)	33.5 (92.3)	38.7 (101.7)	36.8 (98.2)	35.0 (95.0)	31.1 (88.0)	25.8 (78.4)	15.8 (60.4)	7.2 (45.0)	38.7 (101.7)
Mean daily maximum °C (°F)	−13.2 (8.2)	−7.4 (18.7)	2.3 (36.1)	13.2 (55.8)	21.3 (70.3)	26.2 (79.2)	27.6 (81.7)	26.2 (79.2)	21.0 (69.8)	12.0 (53.6)	−0.9 (30.4)	−11.4 (11.5)	9.7 (49.5)
Daily mean °C (°F)	−18.7 (−1.7)	−13.6 (7.5)	−3.6 (25.5)	7.0 (44.6)	15.1 (59.2)	20.7 (69.3)	23.0 (73.4)	21.1 (70.0)	14.8 (58.6)	5.8 (42.4)	−6.1 (21.0)	−16.6 (2.1)	4.1 (39.3)
Mean daily minimum °C (°F)	−23.7 (−10.7)	−19.5 (−3.1)	−9.4 (15.1)	0.8 (33.4)	8.9 (48.0)	15.4 (59.7)	18.5 (65.3)	16.6 (61.9)	9.1 (48.4)	0.3 (32.5)	−10.7 (12.7)	−21.2 (−6.2)	−1.2 (29.7)
Record low °C (°F)	−36.2 (−33.2)	−32.8 (−27.0)	−29.4 (−20.9)	−10.3 (13.5)	−3.5 (25.7)	4.3 (39.7)	9.3 (48.7)	8.0 (46.4)	−2.4 (27.7)	−13.8 (7.2)	−26.0 (−14.8)	−34.5 (−30.1)	−36.2 (−33.2)
Average precipitation mm (inches)	2.5 (0.10)	3.1 (0.12)	8.5 (0.33)	20.0 (0.79)	48.8 (1.92)	102.2 (4.02)	141.4 (5.57)	103.3 (4.07)	52.0 (2.05)	18.8 (0.74)	9.1 (0.36)	5.6 (0.22)	515.3 (20.29)
Average precipitation days (≥ 0.1 mm)	3.7	3.0	4.4	6.4	10.5	13.6	14.6	12.3	9.2	5.7	4.4	5.8	93.6
Average snowy days	6.3	4.8	5.2	2.1	0.2	0	0	0	0	2.1	5.9	8.3	34.9
Average relative humidity (%)	72	67	56	48	52	65	77	78	69	60	64	72	65
Mean monthly sunshine hours	171.0	192.2	229.7	222.6	239.8	238.0	224.3	217.6	219.5	199.6	161.2	151.4	2,466.9
Percentage possible sunshine	61	65	62	55	52	51	47	50	59	60	58	57	56
Source: China Meteorological Administration
