= Sheyang County =

Sheyang 射阳县
- County
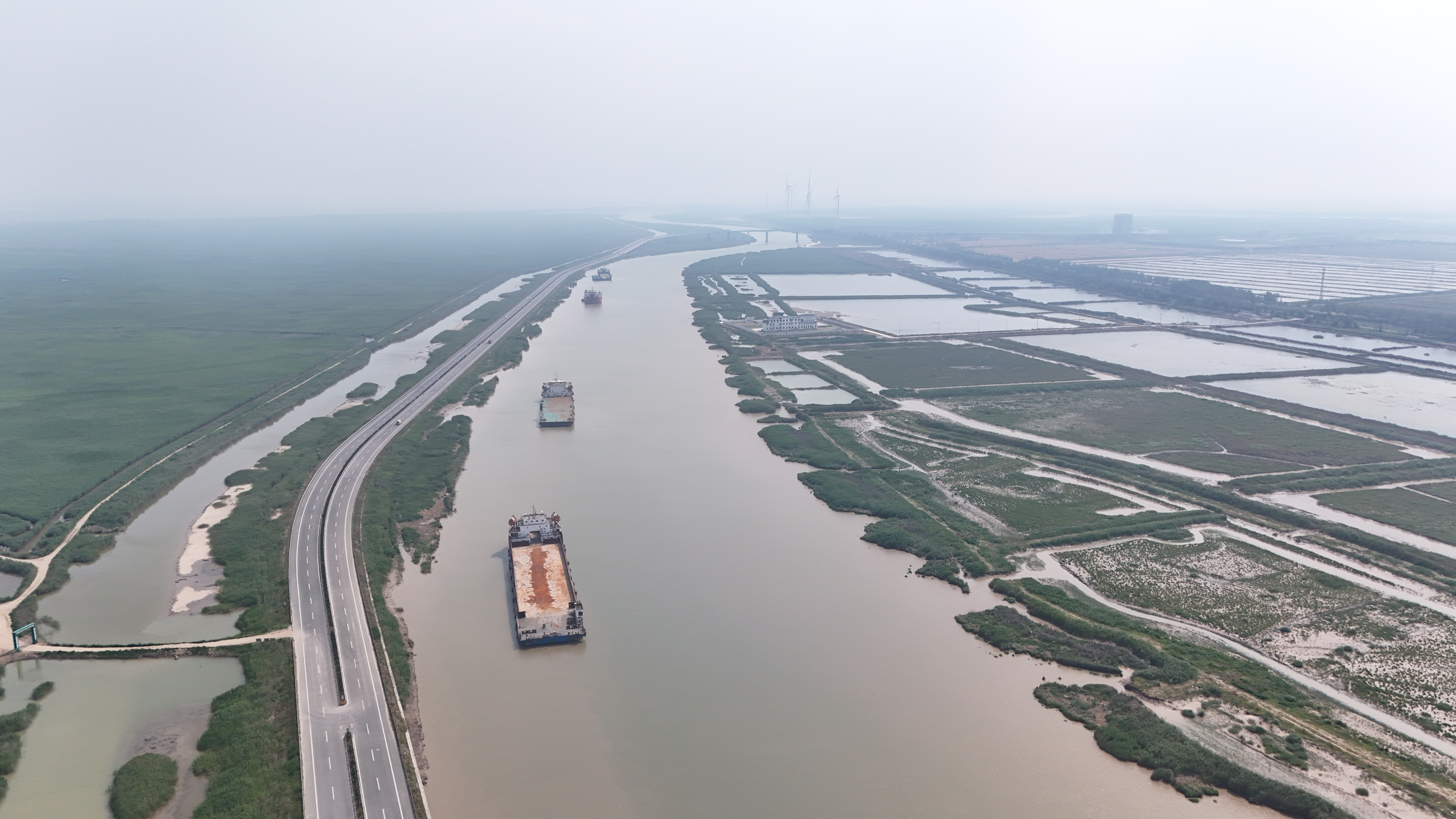

- Location in Jiangsu
- Coordinates: 33°47′13″N 120°15′29″E
- Country: People's Republic of China
- Province: Jiangsu
- Prefecture-level city: Yancheng

Area
  - Total: 2,605.72 km^{2} (1,006.07 sq mi)

Population (2018)
  - Total: 951,800
  - Density: 365.3/km^{2} (946.1/sq mi)
- Time zone: UTC+8 (China Standard)
- Postal code: 224300

Sheyang County (simplified Chinese: 射阳县; traditional Chinese: 射陽縣; pinyin: Shèyáng Xiàn) is under the administration of Yancheng, Jiangsu province, China. It is located northeast of the Yancheng urban area, and has a population of 1,047,000. It has a Yellow Sea coastline of 103 km (64 mi).

== Administrative divisions ==
At present, Sheyang County has 13 towns.

13 towns

- Hede (合德镇)
- Linhai (临海镇)
- Qianqiu (千秋镇)
- Siming (四明镇)
- Haihe (海河镇)
- Haitong (海通镇)
- Xingqiao (兴桥镇)
- Xintan (新坍镇)
- Changdang (长荡镇)
- Panwan (盘湾镇)
- Teyong (特庸镇)
- Yangma (洋马镇)
- Huangshagang (黄沙港镇)

== Climate ==
Climate data for Sheyang, elevation 2 m (6.6 ft), (1991–2020 normals, extremes 1981–present)
Month	Jan	Feb	Mar	Apr	May	Jun	Jul	Aug	Sep	Oct	Nov	Dec	Year
Record high °C (°F)	19.9 (67.8)	25.8 (78.4)	31.7 (89.1)	32.4 (90.3)	35.6 (96.1)	36.9 (98.4)	38.3 (100.9)	37.5 (99.5)	35.0 (95.0)	30.6 (87.1)	28.1 (82.6)	20.2 (68.4)	38.3 (100.9)
Mean daily maximum °C (°F)	5.8 (42.4)	8.2 (46.8)	12.6 (54.7)	19.2 (66.6)	24.5 (76.1)	27.8 (82.0)	30.9 (87.6)	30.3 (86.5)	26.6 (79.9)	22.0 (71.6)	15.4 (59.7)	8.6 (47.5)	19.3 (66.8)
Daily mean °C (°F)	1.5 (34.7)	3.5 (38.3)	7.5 (45.5)	13.6 (56.5)	19.1 (66.4)	23.3 (73.9)	27.1 (80.8)	26.7 (80.1)	22.7 (72.9)	17.1 (62.8)	10.4 (50.7)	4.0 (39.2)	14.7 (58.5)
Mean daily minimum °C (°F)	−1.8 (28.8)	0.0 (32.0)	3.6 (38.5)	8.9 (48.0)	14.6 (58.3)	19.8 (67.6)	24.0 (75.2)	23.9 (75.0)	19.3 (66.7)	12.9 (55.2)	6.4 (43.5)	0.5 (32.9)	11.0 (51.8)
Record low °C (°F)	−11.4 (11.5)	−12.3 (9.9)	−8.3 (17.1)	−0.8 (30.6)	5.1 (41.2)	11.9 (53.4)	17.5 (63.5)	17.1 (62.8)	9.6 (49.3)	1.5 (34.7)	−5.7 (21.7)	−10.2 (13.6)	−12.3 (9.9)
Average precipitation mm (inches)	27.2 (1.07)	32.3 (1.27)	48.0 (1.89)	47.1 (1.85)	67.8 (2.67)	132.5 (5.22)	212.4 (8.36)	183.0 (7.20)	89.4 (3.52)	48.9 (1.93)	53.6 (2.11)	28.8 (1.13)	971 (38.22)
Average precipitation days (≥ 0.1 mm)	5.9	6.7	7.7	7.5	9.4	9.2	13.4	11.9	8.8	6.4	6.9	5.5	99.3
Average snowy days	3.3	2.7	1.1	0.1	0	0	0	0	0	0	0.3	1.1	8.6
Average relative humidity (%)	73	74	74	73	76	80	85	85	80	75	75	72	77
Mean monthly sunshine hours	148.6	151.6	187.9	211.1	218.0	181.5	182.9	200.4	189.4	189.8	156.6	154.8	2,172.6
Percentage possible sunshine	47	49	50	54	51	42	42	49	51	55	51	51	49
Source: China Meteorological Administration

== See also ==
- Jiqiang
