= Songnen Plain =

River plain in China

Coordinates: 46°30′N 125°0′E

The Songnen Plain (Chinese: 松嫩平原; pinyin: Sōngnèn Píngyuán) in Northeast China is named after the Songhua and Nenjiang Rivers and is connected to the Sanjiang Plain through the Songhua River Valley; a small plain lies north of Xingkai Lake in the east.

== Salinization ==
The alkali-saline area of the western Songnen Plain is one of China's most important alkali-saline areas and have been increasing in size by 20,000 square hm per year as a result of natural and anthropogenic factors, which is impeding economic development in the area. Efforts are being made to establish and protect shelterbelt forests, improve the management techniques used in the grasslands, to raise fish and reeds in the lakes of the region, and to improve the conditions of salinized lands.
