= Mingshui County =

Mingshui County 明水县
- County
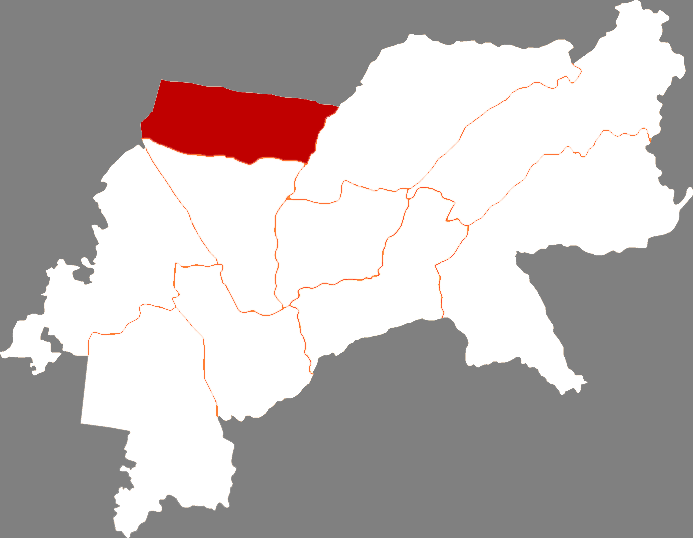
- Mingshui in Suihua

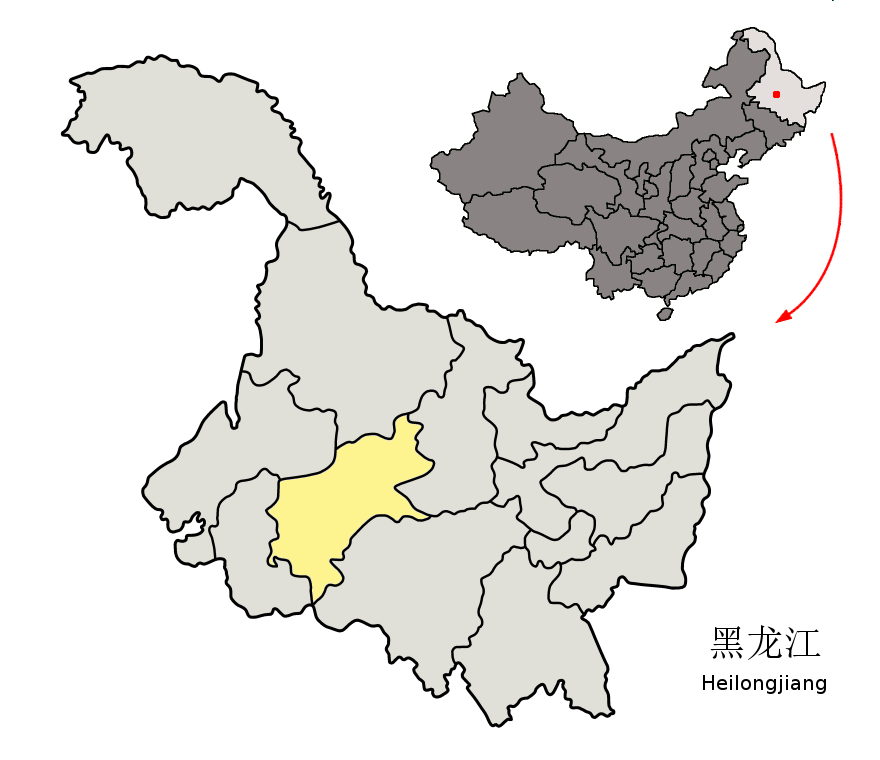
- Suihua in Heilongjiang
- Coordinates: 47°10′23″N 125°54′22″E
- Country: People's Republic of China
- Province: Heilongjiang
- Prefecture-level city: Suihua

Area
  - Total: 2,305.46 km^{2} (890.14 sq mi)

Population (2010)
  - Total: 320,695
  - Density: 139.102/km^{2} (360.274/sq mi)
- Time zone: UTC+8 (China Standard)

Mingshui County (simplified Chinese: 明水县; traditional Chinese: 明水縣; pinyin: Míngshuǐ Xiàn) is a county of Heilongjiang Province, China. It is under the jurisdiction of the prefecture-level city of Suihua. Its population was 336,649 in 1999.

== Administrative divisions ==
Mingshui County is divided into 4 subdistricts, 6 towns and 6 townships.

4 subdistricts

- Mingyang (明阳街道), Mingyuan (明源街道), Mingxin (明新街道), Mingquan (明泉街道)

6 towns

- Mingshui (明水镇), Xingren (兴仁镇), Yongxing (永兴镇), Chongde (崇德镇), Tongda (通达镇), Shuangxing (双兴镇)

6 townships

- Yongjiu (永久乡), Shuren (树人乡), Guangrong (光荣乡), Fanrong (繁荣乡), Tongquan (通泉乡), Yulin (育林乡)

== Climate ==
Climate data for Mingshui, elevation 240 m (790 ft), (1991–2020 normals, extremes 1981–2010)
Month	Jan	Feb	Mar	Apr	May	Jun	Jul	Aug	Sep	Oct	Nov	Dec	Year
Record high °C (°F)	−1.0 (30.2)	7.1 (44.8)	19.9 (67.8)	29.9 (85.8)	33.0 (91.4)	39.0 (102.2)	37.8 (100.0)	36.2 (97.2)	32.0 (89.6)	25.9 (78.6)	14.6 (58.3)	4.8 (40.6)	39.0 (102.2)
Mean daily maximum °C (°F)	−14.6 (5.7)	−8.7 (16.3)	1.0 (33.8)	12.1 (53.8)	20.5 (68.9)	25.6 (78.1)	27.2 (81.0)	25.4 (77.7)	20.1 (68.2)	10.6 (51.1)	−2.4 (27.7)	−12.7 (9.1)	8.7 (47.6)
Daily mean °C (°F)	−19.3 (−2.7)	−14.1 (6.6)	−4.6 (23.7)	6.2 (43.2)	14.5 (58.1)	20.2 (68.4)	22.6 (72.7)	20.6 (69.1)	14.4 (57.9)	5.1 (41.2)	−7.3 (18.9)	−17.1 (1.2)	3.4 (38.2)
Mean daily minimum °C (°F)	−23.3 (−9.9)	−19.1 (−2.4)	−9.8 (14.4)	0.6 (33.1)	8.4 (47.1)	14.8 (58.6)	18.2 (64.8)	16.1 (61.0)	9.1 (48.4)	0.2 (32.4)	−11.4 (11.5)	−21 (−6)	−1.4 (29.4)
Record low °C (°F)	−40.1 (−40.2)	−36.7 (−34.1)	−28.4 (−19.1)	−11.5 (11.3)	−4.7 (23.5)	3.1 (37.6)	9.0 (48.2)	5.1 (41.2)	−5.0 (23.0)	−17.5 (0.5)	−27.9 (−18.2)	−36.0 (−32.8)	−40.1 (−40.2)
Average precipitation mm (inches)	2.6 (0.10)	2.2 (0.09)	6.9 (0.27)	19.3 (0.76)	35.5 (1.40)	100.8 (3.97)	169.1 (6.66)	122.1 (4.81)	55.7 (2.19)	18.3 (0.72)	5.6 (0.22)	3.8 (0.15)	541.9 (21.34)
Average precipitation days (≥ 0.1 mm)	4.1	3.2	4.3	5.8	10.1	13.8	14.2	12.3	9.1	5.4	5.0	5.7	93
Average snowy days	6.9	4.6	6.1	3.2	0.2	0	0	0	0.1	2.2	6.8	8.1	38.2
Average relative humidity (%)	72	66	55	48	49	63	75	76	66	59	64	72	64
Mean monthly sunshine hours	179.6	206.8	249.9	231.0	243.9	229.2	221.3	218.3	224.6	198.7	171.2	160.5	2,535
Percentage possible sunshine	65	71	67	56	52	48	46	50	60	60	62	61	58
Source: China Meteorological Administration
