= Suihua =

Suihua 绥化市 Suihwa
- Prefecture-level city
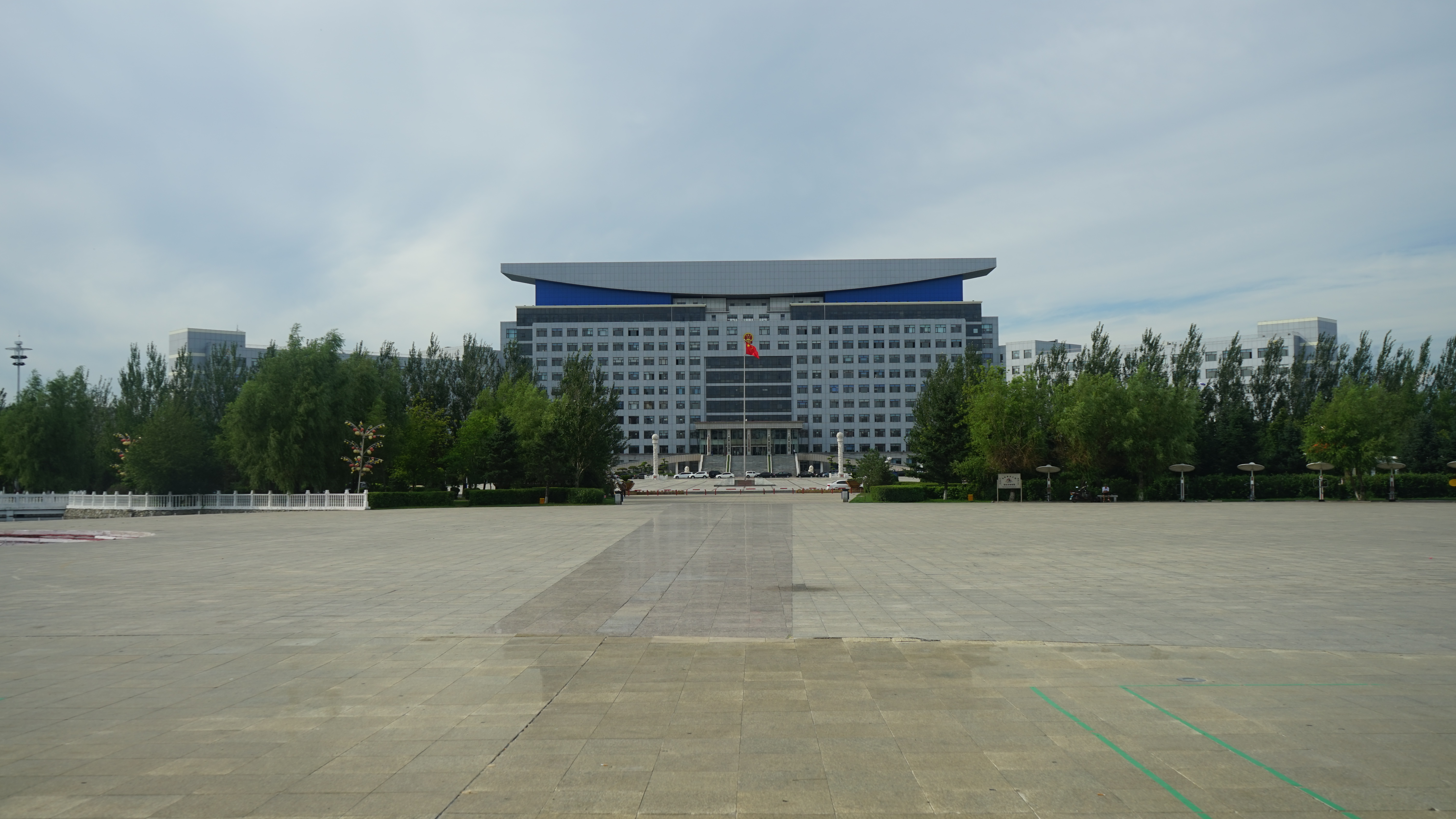
- Suihua People's Square

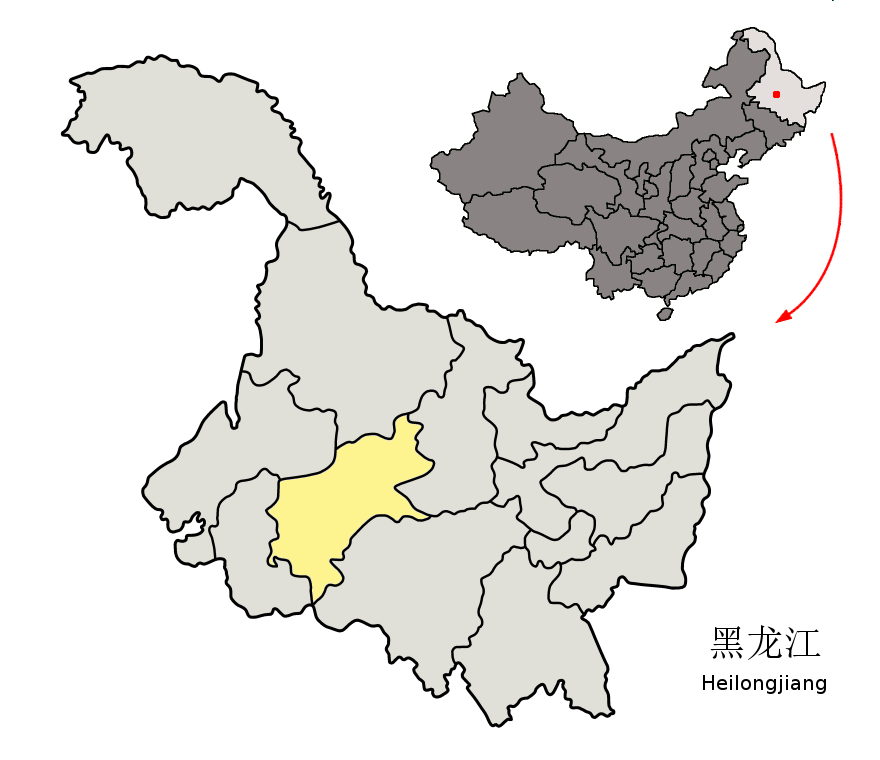
- Location of Suihua City (yellow) in Heilongjiang (light grey)

- Location of the city centre in Heilongjiang
- Coordinates (Suihua municipal government): 46°39′14″N 126°58′08″E
- Country: People's Republic of China
- Province: Heilongjiang
- County-level divisions: 10
- Established: 2000.06.14
- Municipal seat: Beilin District

Government
  - Type: Prefecture-level city
  - CPC Suihua Secretary: Zhang Jingchuan (张晶川)
  - Mayor: Wang Jinhui (王金会)

Area
  - Prefecture-level city: 34,964.17 km^{2} (13,499.74 sq mi)
  - Urban: 2,756.4 km^{2} (1,064.3 sq mi)
  - Metro: 2,756.4 km^{2} (1,064.3 sq mi)

Population (2020 census)
  - Prefecture-level city: 3,756,167
  - Density: 107.4290/km^{2} (278.2399/sq mi)
  - Urban: 698,025
  - Urban density: 253.24/km^{2} (655.88/sq mi)
  - Metro: 698,025
  - Metro density: 253.24/km^{2} (655.88/sq mi)

GDP
  - Prefecture-level city: CN¥ 127.2 billion US$ 20.4 billion
  - Per capita: CN¥ 23,095; US$ 3,708
- Time zone: UTC+8 (China Standard)
- Postal code: 152000
- Area code: 0455
- ISO 3166 code: CN-HL-12
- Licence plates: 黑M
- Climate: Dwa
- Website: www.suihua.gov.cn

Suihua
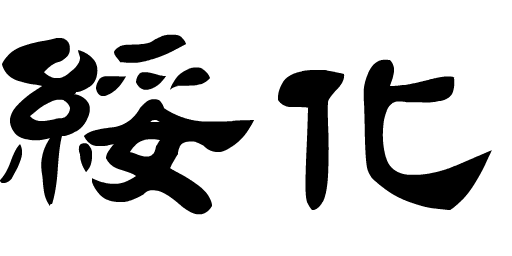
- "Suihua", as written in Chinese calligraphy

Chinese name
- Simplified Chinese: 绥化
- Traditional Chinese: 綏化
Transcriptions
Standard Mandarin
- Hanyu Pinyin: Suīhuà

Manchu name
- Manchu script: ᠰᡠᡳᡥᠠ
- Romanization: Suiha

Russian name
- Russian: Суйхуа

Suihua (Chinese: 绥化) is a prefecture-level city in west-central Heilongjiang province, People's Republic of China, adjacent to Yichun to the east, Harbin, the provincial capital, to the south, Daqing to the west, Qiqihar to the northwest and Heihe to the north. It has 3,756,167 inhabitants at the 2020 census, of whom 698,025 lived in the built-up (or metro) area of Beilin District. By the end of 2024, the resident population of the city will be 3.461 million.

== Geography ==
Suihua is located in the northern part of the Songnen Plain (Songhuajiang-Nenjiang Plain), and situated in the central part of Heilongjiang Province. Bordering prefectures are:

- Daqing (W)
- Harbin (S)
- Heihe (N)
- Qiqihar (NW)
- Yichun (E)

The city is located at latitude 45° 03′–48° 02′ N and longitude 124° 13′–128° 30' E. The total area of the city is 35,211 square kilometres (13,595 sq mi).

=== Transportation ===
The railway station of Suihua is located at the crossing of Taiping Road (太平路) and Beilin Road (北林路) in the eastern region of the city proper. The Harbin-Jiamusi Railway and the Harbin-Heihe Railway connect the city with Harbin, Jiamusi and several other cities in Heilongjiang Province. There are also buses to Daqing, Qiqihar and other cities in Heilongjiang.

=== Climate ===
Suihua has a humid continental climate (Köppen Dwa), with long, bitterly cold, but dry winters, and humid, very warm summers. The monthly 24-hour average temperature ranges from −20.2 °C (−4.4 °F) in January to 22.5 °C (72.5 °F) in July, while the annual mean is 3.3 °C (37.9 °F). A majority of the annual precipitation occurs in July and August alone.

Climate data for Suihua (Beilin District), elevation 180 m (590 ft), (1991–2020 normals, extremes 1971–2010)
Month	Jan	Feb	Mar	Apr	May	Jun	Jul	Aug	Sep	Oct	Nov	Dec	Year
Record high °C (°F)	−0.3 (31.5)	8.0 (46.4)	19.9 (67.8)	29.5 (85.1)	34.5 (94.1)	39.4 (102.9)	36.2 (97.2)	35.5 (95.9)	30.9 (87.6)	25.5 (77.9)	15.8 (60.4)	4.5 (40.1)	39.4 (102.9)
Mean daily maximum °C (°F)	−13.9 (7.0)	−7.9 (17.8)	1.7 (35.1)	12.8 (55.0)	21.0 (69.8)	26.0 (78.8)	27.5 (81.5)	25.9 (78.6)	20.8 (69.4)	11.3 (52.3)	−1.6 (29.1)	−11.8 (10.8)	9.3 (48.8)
Daily mean °C (°F)	−19.3 (−2.7)	−14.0 (6.8)	−3.9 (25.0)	6.8 (44.2)	14.8 (58.6)	20.6 (69.1)	22.9 (73.2)	21.0 (69.8)	14.7 (58.5)	5.6 (42.1)	−6.5 (20.3)	−16.8 (1.8)	3.8 (38.9)
Mean daily minimum °C (°F)	−24.1 (−11.4)	−19.7 (−3.5)	−9.4 (15.1)	0.8 (33.4)	8.7 (47.7)	15.4 (59.7)	18.6 (65.5)	16.6 (61.9)	9.2 (48.6)	0.5 (32.9)	−10.9 (12.4)	−21.2 (−6.2)	−1.3 (29.7)
Record low °C (°F)	−40.1 (−40.2)	−36.5 (−33.7)	−29.6 (−21.3)	−13.8 (7.2)	−5.6 (21.9)	3.4 (38.1)	9.6 (49.3)	6.7 (44.1)	−4.8 (23.4)	−16.7 (1.9)	−30.3 (−22.5)	−36.9 (−34.4)	−40.1 (−40.2)
Average precipitation mm (inches)	4.3 (0.17)	4.6 (0.18)	12.4 (0.49)	22.9 (0.90)	50.3 (1.98)	94.0 (3.70)	155.6 (6.13)	119.7 (4.71)	58.2 (2.29)	25.1 (0.99)	11.7 (0.46)	7.4 (0.29)	566.2 (22.29)
Average precipitation days (≥ 0.1 mm)	5.9	4.1	5.6	7.0	11.3	14.5	14.4	13.5	9.0	7.0	6.1	6.7	105.1
Average snowy days	8.4	5.8	7.6	3.1	0.2	0	0	0	0	2.0	7.7	10	44.8
Average relative humidity (%)	73	68	58	51	53	65	77	79	70	63	66	73	66
Mean monthly sunshine hours	172.9	202.7	244.6	238.9	261.4	256.3	239.0	234.4	232.5	197.7	166.6	151.1	2,598.1
Percentage possible sunshine	62	69	66	58	56	54	50	54	63	59	60	57	59
Source 1: China Meteorological Administration
Source 2: Weather China

== History ==
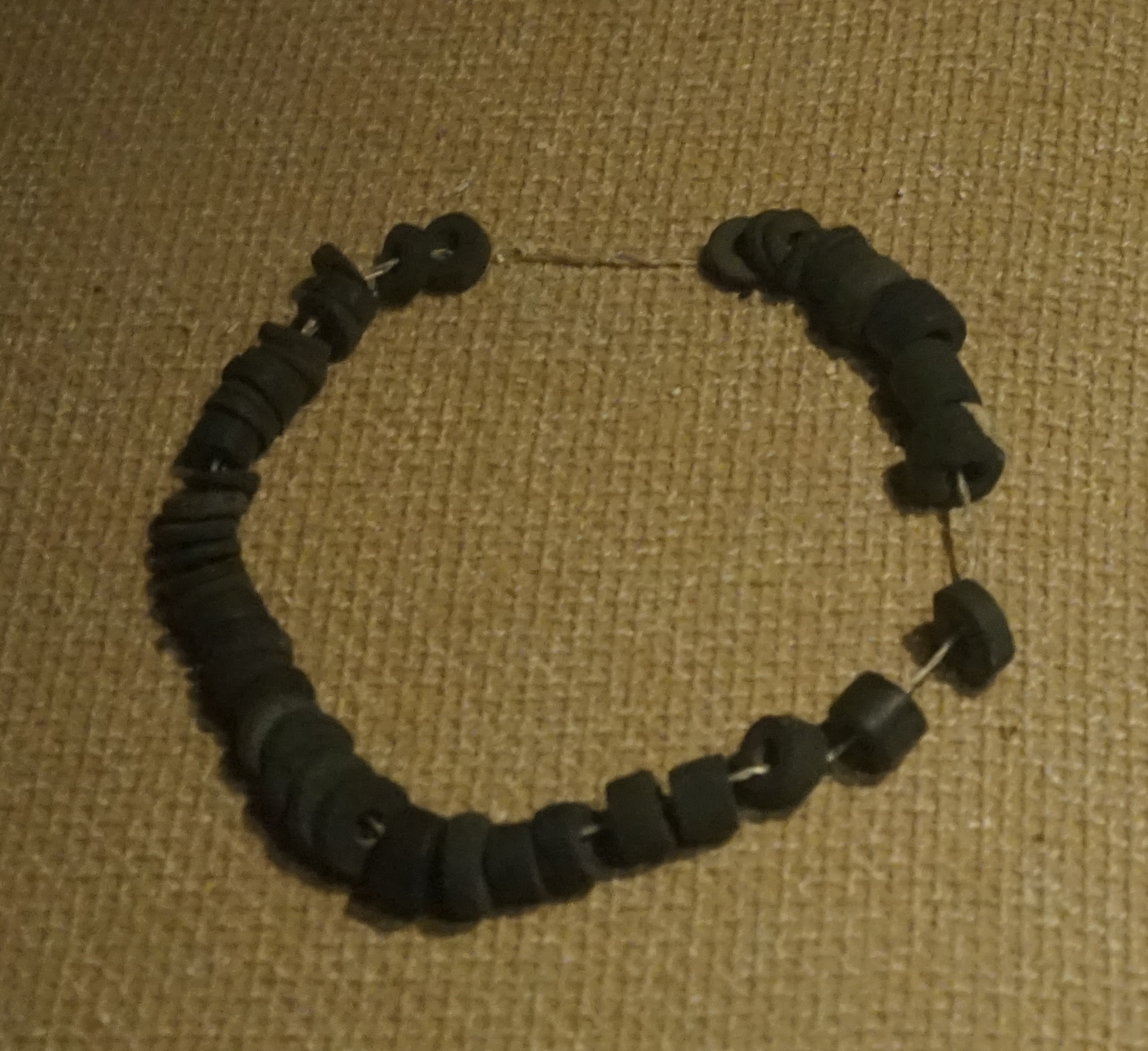
Stone Ornaments. Neolithic Age. Unearthed at Lianhuachi Site, Qing'an.

Suihua's history can be stretched back to over 10,000 years ago. Paleolithic Age stone tools were unearthed at Hailun and Zhaodong. Neolithic sites belong to the Ang'angxi Culture type were also discovered at Anda. Sushen, the ancestors of the Manchu, inhabited in this region During the Xia dynasty and Shang dynasty. During the Yuan dynasty, agriculture developed rapidly in Suihua.

=== Qing dynasty ===
From 1653, Suihua area was under the rule of Ningguta General. In 1683, the position of Heilongjiang General was established, Suihua was under the rule of Heilongjiang General. On November 20, 1885, the Directly Ruled Ting of Suihua (綏化直隸廳) was established at Beilin Tuanzi, a barren at that time. In 1905 it was redesigned as Suihua Fu (綏化府).

=== Republic of China (1912–49) ===
In 1912, an army regiment was established in Suihua. The outbreak of plague caused 1683 deaths that year. In February 1913, 3000 brigands attacked the county seat, and was flattened by the garrison corps. In August 1917, in Suihua established the first telephone company. In July 1919, the 2nd High School of Heilongjiang Province was created. In February 1929, the county government was formally established.

In April 1932, the Japanese entered the city, resistance army led by Ma Zhanshan withdrew. The Manchukuo county government was created on July 12, 1933. In December 1934, Suihua county was put under the administration of Binjiang Province. In 1939, the county was incorporated into Bei'an Province, and the county hospital was built. On July 28, 1941, Counter-Japanese United Army organized the National Salvation Society at Shuanghe, Wuying villages. The Manchu government ordered the peasants to supply military grain, and often faced heavy resistance. In 1943 the Suihua-Jiamusi railway was opened to traffic. The Soviets took the city on August 27, 1945, and Chen Lei was made the first County CPC secretary in November.

The land reform movement began in 1947. Many Suihua people joined the Chinese civil war, especially the Siping Campaign. On May 13, 1949, Suihua County Government was renamed Suihua People's Government.

=== People's Republic of China (1949–present) ===
Suihua is approved to become a prefecture-level city in 1999, and officially designated a prefecture-level city on June 14, 2000.

== Administrative divisions ==
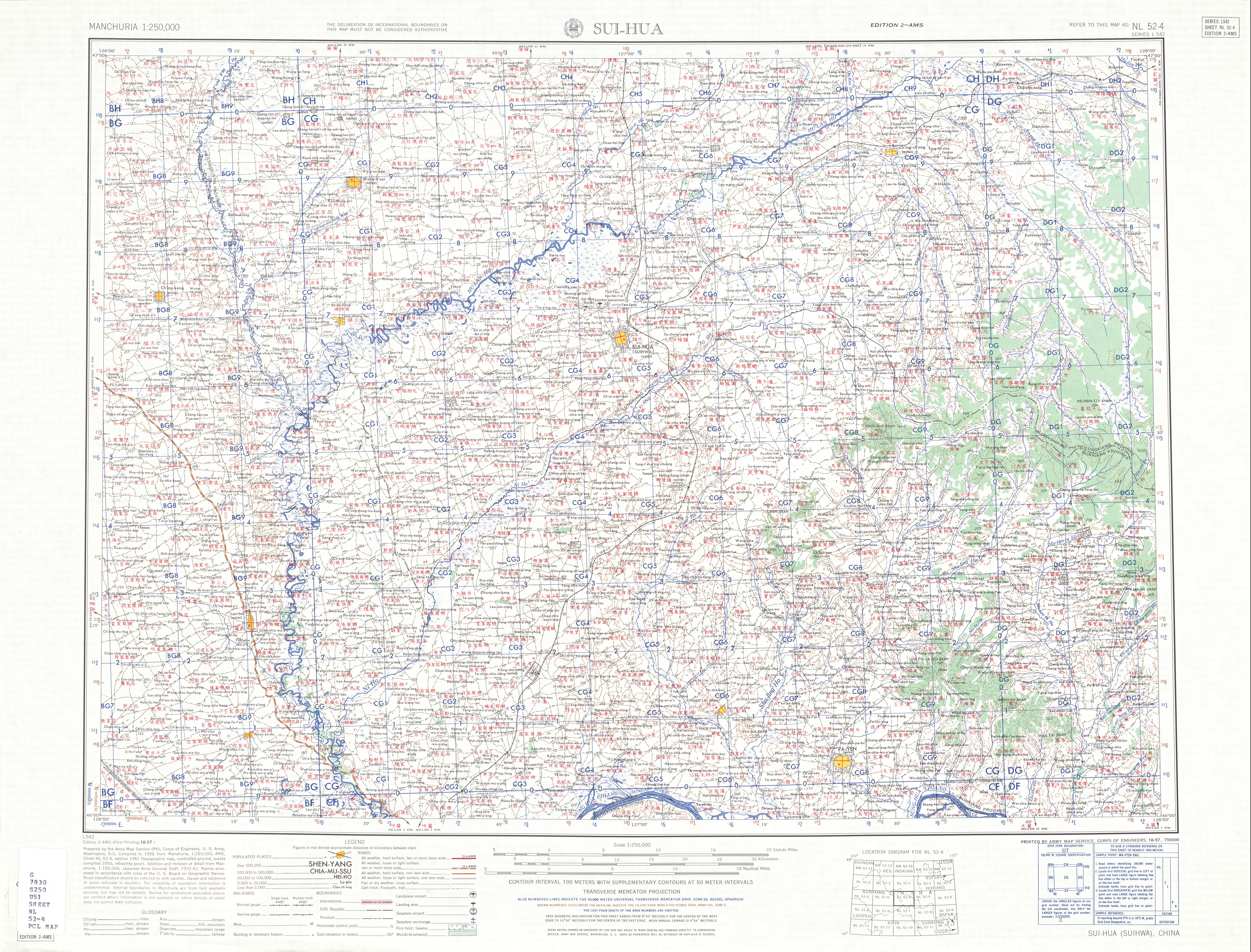
Map including Suihua (labeled as 綏化 SUI-HUA (SUIHWA) (walled)) (AMS, 1955)

Map
Name	Hanzi	Hanyu Pinyin	Population (2010 est.)	Area (km^{2})	Density (/km^{2})
Beilin District	北林区	Běilín Qū	877,114	2,756.4	318
Anda City	安达市	Āndá Shì	472,826	3,586.3	132
Zhaodong City	肇东市	Zhàodōng Shì	903,067	4,331.96	208
Hailun City	海伦市	Hǎilún Shì	769,437	4,667.26	165
Wangkui County	望奎县	Wàngkuí Xiàn	458,725	2,313.78	198
Lanxi County	兰西县	Lánxī Xiàn	424,562	2,499.35	170
Qinggang County	青冈县	Qīnggāng Xiàn	474,422	2,684.71	177
Qing'an County	庆安县	Qìng'ān Xiàn	386,162	5,468.7	71
Mingshui County	明水县	Míngshuǐ Xiàn	320,695	2,305.46	139
Suileng County	绥棱县	Suíléng Xiàn	331,343	4,350.25	76

== Economy ==
As an agricultural production hub in Heilongjiang province, Suihua's GDP has reached RMB 73.34 billion in 2010, an increase of 14.8 percent over the previous year. To the city's GDP, the main contributors are the agricultural sector and service sector. Petrochemicals, textiles and machinery are some other pillar industries in Suihua. In 2015, Suihua had a GDP of RMB 127.22 billion.

== Demographics ==
According to the Seventh National Census in 2020, the city's Permanent Population (Hukou) was 3,756,167. Compared with 5,418,153 in the Sixth National Census in 2010, the number fell by 1,661,986, a drop of 30.67%, with an average annual growth rate of -3.60%.

There were 1,891,784 males, accounting for 50.36%. There were 1,864,383 females, accounting for 49.64%. The sex ratio (with females as 100, the proportion of males to females) decreased from 102.43 in the Sixth National Census to 101.47.

== Education ==
=== Universities and colleges ===
- Suihua University (绥化学院)
- Suihua Education College(绥化市教育学院)
