= Hebe =

Hebe may refer to:

== People, figures, characters ==
- Hebe (mythology), the goddess of youth in Greek mythology
- Hebe, an ethnic slur for a Jew

=== People ===
- Hebe de Bonafini (1928–2022), Argentine activist
- Hebe Camargo (1929–2012), Brazilian television presenter
- Hebe Charlotte Kohlbrugge (1914–2016), Dutch Protestant theologian and Second World War resistance member
- Hebe Tien (born 1983), Taiwanese singer and actress
- Hebe Uhart (1936–2018), Argentine writer
- Hebe Vessuri (born 1942), Argentine social anthropologist
- Sara Hebe (born 1983), Argentine musician

=== Characters ===
- Hebe (Marvel Comics), a Marvel Comics character
- Cousin Hebe, a character in Gilbert and Sullivan's H.M.S. Pinafore

== Places ==
- Hebe Haven, a harbor in Hong Kong
- Hebe Reef, Tasmania, Australia
- Hebe, New York, USA
- 6 Hebe, a main-belt asteroid
- Hebes Chasma, Valles Marineris, Mars
- Hebes Mensa, Hebes Chasma, Valles Marineris, Mars

== Arts and entertainment ==
- Hebe: A Estrela do Brasil, a 2019 Brazilian biographical film
- Hebe, a sculpture by Antonio Canova
- Hebe, a 1964 album by Hebe Camargo
- Hebe, a 1967 album by Hebe Camargo

== Ships ==
- HMS Hebe, five Royal Navy vessels
- Hébé-class frigate, a 1781 French frigate class
  - French frigate Hébé (1782), lead ship of the class, captured by the British (HMS Hebe)
- USS Hebe (SP-966), a United States Navy patrol boat in commission from 1917 to 1918
- RFA Hebe (A406), a RFA store ship commissioned in 1962
- Hebe (ship), several vessels of that name

== Botany ==
- Hebe Society, a New Zealand botanical organisation
- Hebe (plant), a former genus of plants native to New Zealand, now treated as Veronica sect. Hebe
- Veronica sect. Hebe, a garden plant in the Plantago family

== Other uses ==
- Hebe, a South Devon Railway Dido class steam locomotive
- Shortened form of Hebephilia, a sexual interest in pubescent children
- Hebe Tiger Moth, a species of moth

== See also ==
- Heeb, a Jewish website
- Heeb (surname)
- Hebei (disambiguation)
- Hebei, China; a province
- Hebi, Henan, China
- Heby, Uppsala, Sweden
- HEB (disambiguation)
