= List of ships named Hebe =

Many ships have been named Hebe, after Hebe, the goddess of youth in Greek mythology:

== Civilian ships ==
- Hebe (1791 ship) was launched at Bristol, England; a French privateer captured her in 1801 and took her into Guadeloupe
- Hebe (1803 ship) was launched at Chittagong and wrecked in 1808 at Port Dalrymple, Tasmania, Australia
- Hebe (1804 ship) was launched at Leith, Scotland. From 27 April 1804 to 30 October 1812 she served the Royal Navy as a hired armed ship and transport. She spent almost her entire naval career escorting convoys to the Baltic. Afterwards, she became a transport that an American privateer captured in March 1814.
- Hebe (1809 ship) was launched at Sunderland, England and traded between England and Demerara. French privateers captured her in December 1811.
- Hebe (1809 Hull ship) launched at Hull, England. She initially sailed as a West Indiaman but then sailed to the Mediterranean. In 1813 a privateer captured her but the Royal Navy quickly recaptured her. Between 1816 and 1819 she made two voyages to India, sailing under a license from the British East India Company (EIC). On her return, new owners sailed her as a whaler. She was wrecked on 10 March 1821 on her second whaling voyage to the British northern whale fishery.
- Hebe (1810 ship) was launched at Hull, made one voyage for the British East India Company, was captured and recaptured, made one voyage transporting convicts to New South Wales, and was wrecked in 1833.

== Military ships ==
- HMS Hebe, British Royal Navy ships
- RFA Hebe, auxiliary British ships
- USS Hebe, U.S. Navy ships
- HMS Laura (1806) was an Adonis-class schooner of the Royal Navy, launched at Bermuda. Laura served during the Napoleonic Wars before a French privateer captured her at the beginning of the War of 1812. She was briefly the American letter of marque Hebe before the British recaptured her in 1813. Despite having recaptured her, the British did not return Laura to service.
- French frigate Hébé (1782) lead ship of the eponymous class, captured by the British (HMS Hebe)

== See also ==
- Hébé-class frigate of the French Navy
- Hebe (disambiguation)
