= Hebei (disambiguation) =

Hebei is a province in China.

Hebei (Chinese: 河北; lit. 'North of the River' unless otherwise noted) may also refer to:

== Places in People's Republic of China ==
- Hebei District, an urban district of Tianjin

=== Towns ===
- Hebei, Beijing, in Fangshan District, Beijing
- Hebei, Luobei County (鹤北), in Luobei County, Heilongjiang
- Hebei, Shaanxi, in Long County, Shaanxi
- Hebei, Shanxi, in Yangcheng County, Shanxi

=== Townships ===
- Hebei Township, Heilongjiang, in Keshan County, Heilongjiang
- Hebei Township, Liaoning, in Fushun, Liaoning
- Hebei Township, Qinghai, in Tongde County, Qinghai

=== Subdistricts ===
- Hebei Subdistrict, Gongzhuling, in Gongzhuling, Jilin
- Hebei Subdistrict, Jiaohe, in Jiaohe, Jilin
- Hebei Subdistrict, Fuxin, in Haizhou District, Fuxin, Liaoning
- Hebei Subdistrict, Ya'an, in Yucheng District, Ya'an, Sichuan

== Historical regions ==
- Heshuo, also named Hebei, an ancient Chinese term referring to areas north of the Yellow River
- Hebei Circuit, a major administrative division during the Tang, Five Dynasties and Song dynasties

== See also ==
- Hebei people, Mandarin-speaking people of North China from Hebei province
- 2505 Hebei, main-belt asteroid
