= French frigate Hébé =

French frigate Hébé includes the following ships:

- French frigate Hébé (1757), wrecked in 1763
- French frigate Hébé (1782), lead Hébé-class frigate, captured by the Royal Navy in 1782

== See also ==
- List of ships named Hebe
- Hebe (disambiguation)
