= Action of 4 September 1782 =

- Part of the American Revolutionary War
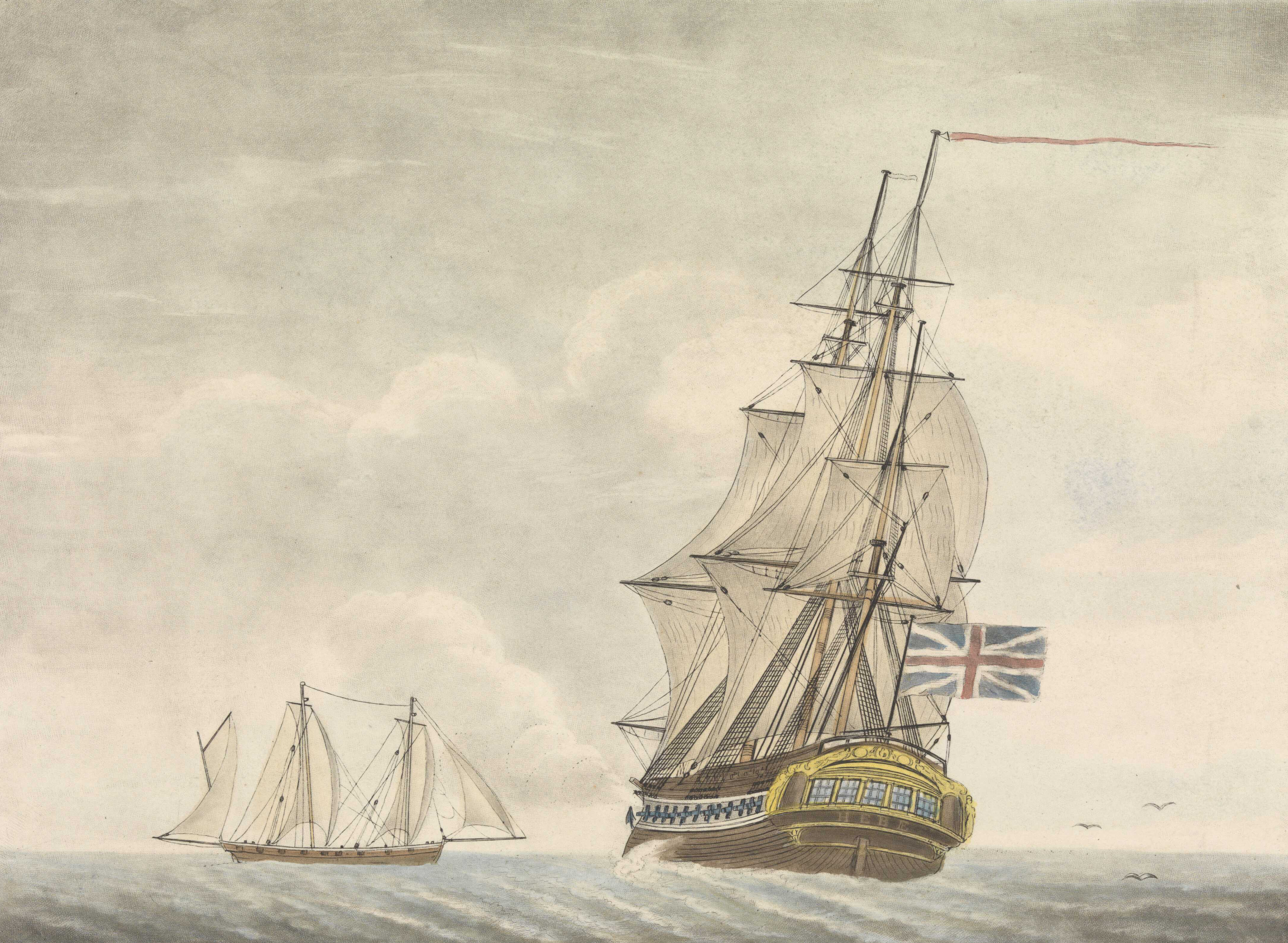
- Hébé (right) as HMS Hebe in 1795
Date	4 September 1782
Location	Off the Île de Batz, English Channel
Result	British victory

Belligerents
Great Britain	France

Commanders and leaders
Henry Trollope	Joseph-Pierre de Vigny (surrendered)

Strength
1 frigate	1 frigate

Casualties and losses
1 killed 2 wounded	5 killed 7 wounded 360 captured 1 frigate captured

The action of 4 September 1782 was a single-ship action fought off the Île de Batz between the French Navy frigate Hébé and Royal Navy frigate HMS Rainbow. It was the first military engagement to see the proper use of British carronade design, which proved so effective that Hébé promptly struck her colours right after the first broadside from Rainbow.

== Battle ==
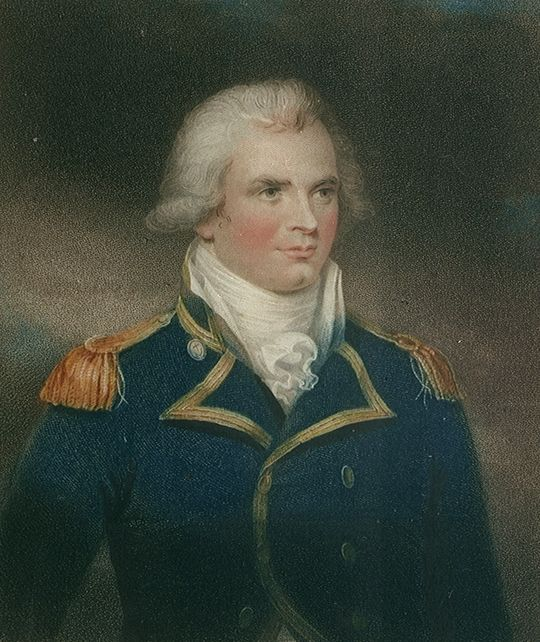
Portrait of Trollope

On 4 September 1782 the 44-gun frigate HMS Rainbow of the Royal Navy under Captain Henry Trollope, armed entirely with carronades, was off the French coast near the Île de Batz when a ship was sighted. Having then chased the vessel, it turned out to be the French Navy frigate Hébé. The 1,063-ton Hébé was a new ship of the class of the same name whose armament consisted of 38 guns, 26 of which were 18-pounder long guns. It was commanded by Ship-of-the-line Captain Joseph-Pierre de Vigny and had on board 360 men. Hébé had left Saint-Malo on 3 September and was heading to Brest escorting a small convoy. At 7:00 am, having arrived within gunshot of the French ship, the Rainbow commenced firing 32-pounder chase guns from the forecastle, which were returned by the frigate. One 32-pound ball shot away Hébé's wheel and killed her second captain.

Vigny examined the fragments of the hollow carronade shot and concluded that if she was firing 32-pounders as chase pieces, she was actually a ship of the line in disguise. He fired one broadside "for the honour of the flag" and struck his colours. The surrender of Hébé after slight resistance was not surprising when taking into consideration the advantage provided by the unusual armament of the Rainbow. Rainbow lost only one man killed and two slightly wounded. The French lost five killed, including the second captain, Yves-Gabriel Calloët de Lanidy, and several wounded out of a crew of 360 men.

== Aftermath ==
Following the engagement a council of war was held by French authorities at Morlaix, which sentenced Vigny to be discharged from military service and 15 years in prison for surrendering his ship with so little resistance. The captured ship was immediately commissioned into the Royal Navy as HMS Hebe. After being renamed HMS Blonde in 1805 it was decommissioned and broken up in 1811. Hebe also served as a model for a new series of British frigates, the Leda class, the first of which was launched in 1800. The new class would include HMS Surprise (1812), HMS Trincomalee (1817), HMS Unicorn (1824), and a second HMS Hebe (1826).
