= Henry Trollope =

Royal Navy Admiral (1756–1839)

Admiral Sir Henry Trollope GCB
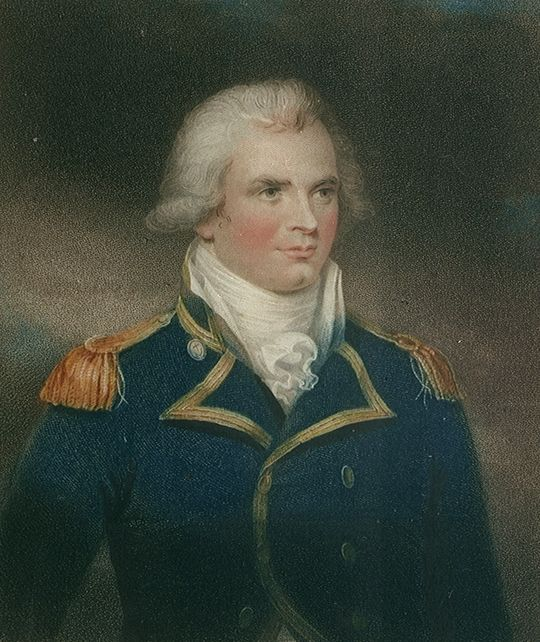
- Sir Henry Trollope
- Born: 20 April 1756
- Died: 2 November 1839 (aged 83); Bath, Somerset
- Burial place: St. James’s Church, Bath
- Military career
- Allegiance: Great Britain; United Kingdom
- Branch: Royal Navy
- Service years: 1770–1815
- Rank: Admiral
- Commands: HMS Kite; HMS Myrmidon; HMS Prudente; HMS Hussar; HMS Rainbow; HMS Glatton; HMS Russell; HMS Juste
- Conflicts: American Revolutionary War: Battle of Lexington; Battle of Bunker Hill; French Revolutionary War: Battle of Camperdown
- Awards: Knight Companion of the Order of the Bath; Knight Grand Cross of the Order of the Bath (1831)

Admiral Sir Henry Trollope, GCB (20 April 1756 – 2 November 1839) was an officer of the British Royal Navy.

== Early life ==
Henry Trollope was born the son of the Reverend John Trollope of Bucklebury on 20 April 1756. His paternal grandfather, also named Henry, was the brother of Sir Thomas Trollope, 4th Baronet.

== Early career ==
Trollope entered the Royal Navy at the age of fourteen in April 1771. He joined the ship of the line HMS Captain, flagship of Rear-Admiral John Montagu, which subsequently sailed to the North America Station. While on board Captain Trollope rose from captain's servant to able seaman and then to midshipman. The ship returned to England in 1774 and Trollope then transferred to the ship of the line HMS Asia, also on the North America Station, to serve in the American Revolutionary War. As such he fought at the Battle of Lexington on 19 April 1775 and at the Battle of Bunker Hill on 17 June. At both battles he served in Asia's small boats, covering the British retreat at Lexington and assisting in landing the troops at Bunker Hill. His actions during these battles resulted in him being temporarily assigned to HMS Kingfisher soon afterwards to assist in the British response to the rising up of Virginia.

Trollope subsequently fought at the Siege of Boston before in 1777 reverting to his position on board Asia to return to England. He was promoted to lieutenant on 25 April 1777 and as such joined the fourth-rate Bristol as her third lieutenant. Bristol soon sailed to New York conveying a group of troop ships. Upon arriving Trollope was chosen to take Bristol's boats up the North River in an attempt to reinforce the army of General John Burgoyne with more soldiers. Burgoyne surrendered before Trollope could reach him and he returned to Bristol. The ship joined the fleet of Vice-Admiral Lord Howe off Delaware and subsequently participated in the capture of Philadelphia on 26 September.

After this Trollope transferred to the fourth-rate HMS Chatham which returned to England for a refit, arriving at Sheerness Dockyard in early 1778. Trollope had become the first lieutenant of Chatham by this time, but after France entered the war on the United States' side he successfully petitioned to be given command of the cutter HMS Kite. Kite was stationed on the Downs Station and Trollope saw the opportunity for early promotion through commanding her against the newly hostile France. Kite sailed from port on 14 March, one day after France officially entered the war, and the same day he captured a French brig off Calais. Kite was kept busy over the ensuing months examining merchant vessels for enemy goods and taking a number of them as prize. Trollope was sailing in Kite off Portland on 30 March when he discovered a French 28-gun frigate chasing thirty British merchant ships; he engaged the frigate and successfully chased her away from her prey. A day later he similarly attacked and forced the withdrawal of an 18-gun brig. In this action Kite's rigging was heavily damaged and Trollope was forced to go to Portsmouth Dockyard for repairs. For his successes during this period he was promoted to commander on 16 April 1779.

== Post Captain ==
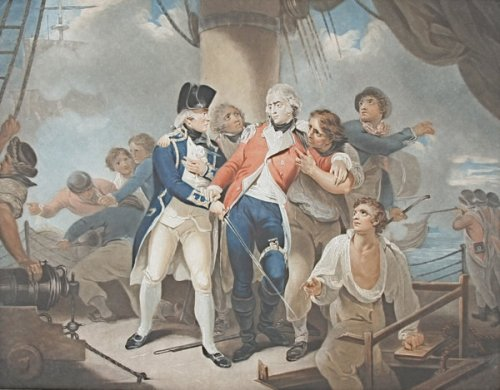
Trollope with the mortally wounded Marine Captain Henry Ludlow Strangeways on the deck of HMS Glatton

He was promoted to Post Captain in 1781. Following the peace of 1783 between Britain and the United States of America, he lived in Wales before returning to sea in 1790 as the captain of the 38-gun fifth rate Prudente. Trollope, described as "carronade-crazy" in Gardiner's Warships of the Napoleonic Era, commanded two ships armed entirely with carronades: HMS Rainbow, a 44-gun frigate with which he captured the French frigate Hébé on 4 September 1782; and Glatton, with which he routed a French squadron of four frigates, two corvettes, a brig and a cutter, and drove them into Flushing.

== The Nore Mutiny ==
In March–April 1797, Trollope kept Glatton's crew from joining the Nore mutiny. By threatening to fire on the 64-gun Overyssel and the 40-gun Beaulieu, which were in open mutiny, he convinced their crews to return to duty.

== The battle of Camperdown ==
Later in 1797 he commanded the 74-gun Russell at the Battle of Camperdown. For his part in this victory he was made a Knight Companion of the Order of the Bath and elevated as a Knight Grand Cross in 1831.

== Retirement ==
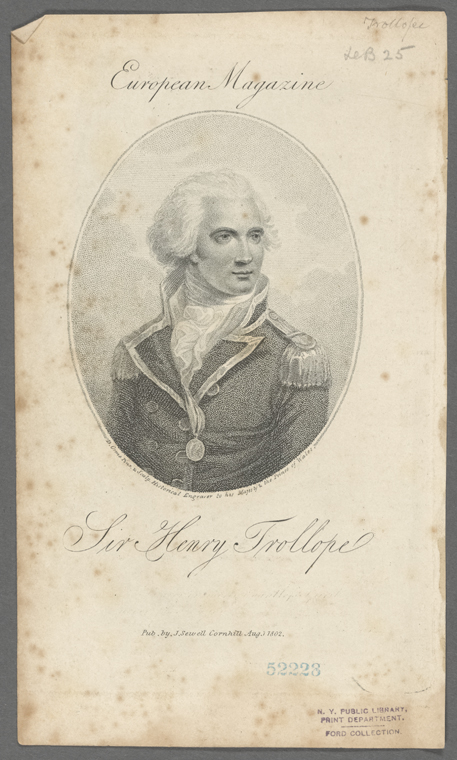
Sir Henry Trollope, 1802

He was promoted to rear admiral on 1 January 1801 and to Admiral in 1812, but did not serve in an active role. He committed suicide at Freshford, near Bath on 2 November 1839.

== Legacy ==
The Captain-class frigate HMS Trollope was named for him.

== See also ==
- O'Byrne, William Richard (1849). "Trollope, George Barne#cite note-Henry Trollope-1" . A Naval Biographical Dictionary . John Murray – via Wikisource.
