= List of shipwrecks in March 1821 =

The list of shipwrecks in March 1821 includes ships sunk, wrecked or otherwise lost during March 1821.

== 1 March ==
List of shipwrecks: 1 March 1821
Ship	State	Description
Applecross	United Kingdom	The ship was wrecked near the Point Lynas Lighthouse, Anglesey. She was on a voyage from Liverpool, Lancashire to Limerick.
Jean	United Kingdom	The whaler was driven ashore and wrecked at Aberdeen. She was on a voyage from North Shields, County Durham to Greenland.
John	United Kingdom	The ship was driven ashore and wrecked at Theddlethorpe, Lincolnshire. Her crew were rescued.

== 2 March ==
List of shipwrecks: 2 March 1821
Ship	State	Description
Congress	United Kingdom	The ship foundered in the Atlantic Ocean with the loss of all hands. She was on a voyage from Baltimore, Maryland, United States to Liverpool, Lancashire.
Hannah	United Kingdom	The ship was wrecked on the Crow-Head Rocks, off Castlehaven, County Cork. Her crew were rescued. She was on a voyage from Porto, Portugal to Sligo.
Mary & Ann	United Kingdom	The ship was driven ashore at Kirkcaldy, Fife, where she broke up on 4 March. She was on a voyage from South Shields, County Durham to London.

== 3 March ==
List of shipwrecks: 3 March 1821
Ship	State	Description
Maria	United States	The schooner struck a rock and foundered off Tiree, Inner Hebrides, United Kingdom with the loss of a crew member. She was on a voyage from New York to Christiansand, Norway.
Paulina	Portugal	The ship struck a rock and sank in the Tagus. She was on a voyage from Lisbon to Bordeaux, Gironde, France.
Peggy	United Kingdom	The ship was wrecked off Porthleven, Cornwall. Her crew were rescued. she was on a voyage from Lisbon, Portugal to London.
Three Brothers	United States	The ship capsized off Bermuda with the loss of six of her seven crew. The survivor was rescued by Lapwing (United Kingdom). She was on a voyage from Indian Island, Washington to Berbice.
Williams	United Kingdom	The ship ran ashore at Newhaven, Sussex. She was on a voyage from Lisbon to London. Williams was later refloated and taken in to Newhaven.

== 4 March ==
List of shipwrecks: 4 March 1821
Ship	State	Description
Florestine	France	The ship was lost whilst on a voyage from Trinity to Port Royal, Jamaica.
Fortuna	Norway	The ship was driven ashore and wrecked at Montrose, Forfarshire, United Kingdom with the loss of two of her crew. She was on a voyage from Arendahl to Saint-Vaast-la-Hougue, Manche, France
Fortuna	Spain	The felucca foundered off Cape Trafalgar. Her crew were rescued. She was on a voyage from Cádiz to Gibraltar. Barratry was suspected.
Lustre	United Kingdom	The ship was severely damaged at Newcastle upon Tyne, Northumberland.
Fortuna	Spain	The felucca foundered in the Atlantic Ocean off Cape Trafalgar. Her crew were rescued. She was on a voyage from Cádiz to Gibraltar. Her captain was later arrested for barratry
Palladium	United Kingdom	The ship was severely damaged at Newcastle upon Tyne.
Ranger	United Kingdom	The ship was damaged at Newcastle upon Tyne.
Sally	United Kingdom	The ship was damaged at Newcastle upon Tyne.
Vine	United Kingdom	The brig was driven ashore and wrecked at Sunderland Bridge, County Durham.
Whitby	United Kingdom	The ship was severely damaged at Newcastle upon Tyne.

== 6 March ==
List of shipwrecks: 6 March 1821
Ship	State	Description
Hero	United States	The ship sprang a leak and was beached at Chatham, Massachusetts. She was on a voyage from Nantucket, Massachusetts to Halifax, Nova Scotia, British North America.
Susannah	United Kingdom	The ship was wrecked on the Point of Carnes, County Wexford with the loss of a crew member. She was on a voyage from Palermo, Sicily to Dublin.
Young Halliday	United Kingdom	The ship was lost near the Calf of Man, Isle of Man. Her crew were rescued. She was on a voyage from Savannah, Georgia, United States to the Clyde.

== 7 March ==
List of shipwrecks: 7 March 1821
Ship	State	Description
Active	United Kingdom	The ship was driven ashore at Fowey, Cornwall.
Blanch	United States	The ship was wrecked at New Orleans, Louisiana. All on board were rescued.
Higson	United Kingdom	The ship struck a sandbank off Mizen Head, County Wicklow and sank. All on board were rescued. She was on a voyage from Liverpool, Lancashire to Buenos Aires, Argentina.
Venus	United States	The schooner was wrecked in the New Shetland Islands.
Young Halliday	United Kingdom	The ship was wrecked on the Calf of Man, Isle of Man. Her crew survived. She was on a voyage from Savannah, Georgia, United States to Greenock, Renfrewshire.

== 8 March ==
List of shipwrecks: 8 March 1821
Ship	State	Description
Arthur le Juvenale	France	The brig was driven ashore and wrecked at Langton Matravers, Dorset, United Kingdom. She was on a voyage from St. Domingo to Havre de Grâce, Seine-Inférieure.
Chilow	United Kingdom	The ship was driven ashore and wrecked at Ilfracombe, Devon. Her crew were rescued. She was on a voyage from Burry Port, Glamorgan to Falmouth, Cornwall.
Clulow	United Kingdom	The ship was wrecked at "Hillbro' Hill".
Pearl	United Kingdom	The ship was lost near Cape Florida, United States. Five of her crew survived. She was on a voyage from Havana, Cuba to Gibraltar.

== 9 March ==
List of shipwrecks: 9 March 1821
Ship	State	Description
Patriot	United States	The schooner was wrecked on the Double-Headed Shot Key. Her crew were rescued.
Vittoria	United Kingdom	The ship was wrecked on the Goodwin Sands, Kent. Her crew survived. She was on a voyage from Cork to London.

== 10 March ==
List of shipwrecks: 10 March 1821
Ship	State	Description
Cerberus	United Kingdom	The ship was driven ashore at Blaauwberg, Cape Colony, where she was wrecked on 22 March. Her crew were rescued. She was on a voyage from Bengal, India to Ceylon and London.
Hebe	United Kingdom	The whaler was driven ashore and wrecked near Belhelvie, Aberdeen, with the loss of five of her crew. She was on a voyage from Hull, Yorkshire to the Davis Strait.

== 11 March ==
List of shipwrecks: 11 March 1821
Ship	State	Description
Crawford	United Kingdom	The ship was last sighted off Saint Kitts bound for the Orinoco. Presumed sucsequently foundered with the loss of all hands.
Eline	France	The ship was driven ashore at Scheveningen, South Holland, Netherlands. She was on a voyage from Havre de Grâce, Seine-Inférieure to Rotterdam, South Holland.

== 12 March ==
List of shipwrecks: 12 March 1821
Ship	State	Description
Decatur	United States	The ship foundered after striking the Turn. She was on a voyage from New Orleans, Louisiana to Baltimore, Maryland.
Jean François	France	The ship struck an anchor and sank at Le Verdon-sur-Mer, Gironde.

== 14 March ==
List of shipwrecks: 14 March 1821
Ship	State	Description
John	United Kingdom	The ship was driven ashore and capsized at Theddlethorpe, Lincolnshire. Her crew were rescued. She was on a voyage from the Charente to Hull, Yorkshire.

== 15 March ==
List of shipwrecks: 15 March 1821
Ship	State	Description
James	United Kingdom	The whaler was driven ashore and wrecked at Aberdeen. Her crew were rescued.
Violet	United Kingdom	The ship was lost near Sligo.

== 18 March ==
List of shipwrecks: 18 March 1821
Ship	State	Description
Amity	United Kingdom	The ship was driven ashore near Workington, Cumberland. She was on a voyage from Sierra Leone to Workington. Amity was later refloated.
Anna Sophia	Sweden	The ship was driven ashore at Liverpool, Lancashire, United Kingdom. She was on a voyage from Liverpool to Stockholm.
Comet	United Kingdom	The ship was driven ashore in the River Mersey. She was later refloated.
Cossack	United Kingdom	The ship was driven ashore in the River Mersey. She was on a voyage from Liverpool to a Baltic port. Cossack was later refloated.
Dorothea Louisa	Bremen	The ship was driven ashore in the Weser. She was on a voyage from Málaga, Spain to Bremen.
Henry	United Kingdom	The ship was driven ashore and wrecked at Workington.
Friendship	United Kingdom	The ship sprang a leak and was beached at Happisburgh, Norfolk. She was on a voyage from Louth, Lincolnshire to London.
Hope	(United Kingdom of Great Britain and Ireland) British North America	The ship was driven ashore in the River Mersey. She was later refloated.
Maria	United Kingdom	The ship was driven ashore in the River Mersey. She was refloated on 5 April.
Mary	United Kingdom	The sloop was wrecked at Dunluce Castle, County Antrim with the loss of all hands.
Princess of Wales	United Kingdom	The ship was lost in the Crozet Islands.
Speculation	United Kingdom	The ship foundered in the Atlantic Ocean with the loss of all hands. She was on a voyage from Londonderry to Ballina, County Mayo.

== 19 March ==
List of shipwrecks: 19 March 1821
Ship	State	Description
Dorset	United Kingdom	The ship was driven ashore and wrecked at Workington, Cumberland.
William & Margaret	United Kingdom	The ship was wrecked on the Hoyle Bank, in Liverpool Bay with the loss of all hands. She was on a voyage from Killala, County Louth to Liverpool, Lancashire.

== 20 March ==
List of shipwrecks: 20 March 1821
Ship	State	Description
Briton	United Kingdom	The ship ran aground and sank at Black Point, near Beaumaris, Anglesey. She was on a voyage from Poole, Dorset to Liverpool, Lancashire.

== 21 March ==
List of shipwrecks: 21 March 1821
Ship	State	Description
Sophia	United Kingdom	The ship was driven ashore and wrecked at Fishguard, Pembrokeshire. She was on a voyage from Glasgow, Renfrewshire to Gibraltar and Buenos Aires, Argentina.
Symmetry	United States	The ship was wrecked on the Cross Sand, in the North Sea off the coast of Norfolk, United Kingdom with the loss of four lives. She was on a voyage from South Shields, County Durham, United Kingdom to Boston, Massachusetts.
Vine	United Kingdom	The ship ran aground on the West Hoyle Sandbank, in Liverpool Bay. She was on a voyage from Dublin to Workington, Cumberland.

== 22 March ==
List of shipwrecks: 22 March 1821
Ship	State	Description
Essex Junior	United States	The ship was abandoned in the Atlantic Ocean. Her crew survived. She was on a voyage from Boston, Massachusetts to Madeira, Portugal.

== 23 March ==
List of shipwrecks: 23 March 1821
Ship	State	Description
Geerdina	Netherlands	The ship foundered off Stavanger, Norway. She was on a voyage from Amsterdam, North Holland to Bergen, Norway.
Liverpool	United Kingdom	The smack was driven ashore at Ardgowan House, Renfrewshire. She was on a voyage from Glasgow, Renfrewshire to Liverpool, Lancashire.
Maggy Lauder	(United Kingdom of Great Britain and Ireland) Jamaica	The ship was driven ashore at Savanna-la-Mar, Jamaica. She was declared a total loss.

== 24 March ==
List of shipwrecks: 24 March 1821
Ship	State	Description
Wilhelm Gustav	Denmark	The ship was lost near Lonstrup. Her crew were rescued.

== 25 March ==
List of shipwrecks: 25 March 1821
Ship	State	Description
Nancy	Malta	The brig was driven ashore at Hubberston, Pembrokeshire, United Kingdom. She was on a voyage from Cardiff, Glamorgan, United Kingdom to Constantinople, Ottoman Empire

== 26 March ==
List of shipwrecks: 26 March 1821
Ship	State	Description
William	United Kingdom	The ship was driven ashore and wrecked at Padstow, Cornwall with the loss of all hands and a pilot.

== 27 March ==
List of shipwrecks: 27 March 1821
Ship	State	Description
Argonaut	United States	The ship was driven ashore on "Gerish's Island". She was on a voyage from Livorno, Grand Duchy of Tuscany to Portsmouth, New Hampshire.
Familien Lucken	Norway	The ship was wrecked on Stromsay, Orkney Islands, United Kingdom. Her crew were rescued. She was on a voyage from Christiansand to Cádiz, Spain.
Garland	United Kingdom	The ship was driven ashore on the Spanish Battery Rocks, North Shields, County Durham. She was later refloated.
Hope	United Kingdom	The schooner was driven ashore on the Spanish Battery Rocks. She was later refloated.
John Bulkeley	United States	The ship sprang a leak and foundered off Jamaica. She was on a voyage from Bordeaux, Gironde, France to New Orleans, Louisiana.
Mary Ann	United Kingdom	The ship was driven ashore and damaged on the Spanish Battery Rocks. She was later refloated and taken in to North Shields.
William	United Kingdom	The ship was driven ashore and wrecked at Stepper Point, Cornwall with the loss of all on board.

== 28 March ==
List of shipwrecks: 28 March 1821
Ship	State	Description
Jane	United Kingdom	The schooner foundered in the English Channel off The Lizard, Cornwall with the loss of a crew member.
John Bulkeley	United States	The ship sprang a leak and foundered off Jamaica. She was on a voyage from Bordeaux, Gironde, France to New Orleans, Louisiana.
Sophia	United Kingdom	The ship was driven ashore and wrecked at Fishguard, Pembrokeshire She was on a voyage from Glasgow, Renfrewshire to Gibraltar.

== 31 March ==
List of shipwrecks: 31 March 1821
Ship	State	Description
John Bainbridge	United Kingdom	The ship was abandoned in the Atlantic Ocean off Crooked Island, Bahamas and then foundered. She was on a voyage from Havre de Grâce, Seine-Inférieure, France to Charleston, South Carolina, United States.

== Unknown date ==
List of shipwrecks: Unknown date in March 1821
Ship	State	Description
Active	United Kingdom	The ship sprang a leak at Fowey, Cornwall and was beached.
Diogene	Grand Duchy of Tuscany	The ship was wrecked on the coast of Sardinia. She was on a voyage from Tunis to Genoa.
Felicity	United Kingdom	The ship was lost near Campbeltown, Argyllshire with the loss of three lives. She was on a voyage from Dublin to Glasgow, Renfrewshire.
Helen	United Kingdom	The ship foundered in the Irish Sea off Holyhead, Anglesey. She was on a voyage from Waterford to Dublin.
Higson	United Kingdom	The ship was wrecked near Wicklow. She was on a voyage from Liverpool, Lancashire to Buenos Aires, Argentina.
Jessie	United Kingdom	The ship was wrecked on Arranmore, County Donegal before 23 March. Her crew were rescued. She was on a voyage from Greenock, Renfrewshire to Newfoundland, British North America.
Leal	Portugal	The schooner was captured and sunk off Cape St. Vincent by an insurgent privateer.
Mary Ann	United Kingdom	The ship foundered in the North Sea off Dunbar, Lothian. Her crew were rescued.
Navigateur	France	The ship was wrecked on Chandelie Island, near the mouth of the Mississippi River. She was on a voyage from Rouen and Havre de Grâce, Seine-Inférieure to New Orleans, Louisiana, United States.
Perseverance	United Kingdom	The ship was seen stripped and abandoned at St Mary's (37°03′S 73°31′W).
Santa Rosa	Spain	The ship was wrecked on Egg Island, Georgia, United States. Her crew were rescued. She was on a voyage from Philadelphia, Pennsylvania to Havana, Cuba.
William & Margaret	United Kingdom	The ship foundered in Liverpool Bay. She was on a voyage from Kinsale, County Cork to Liverpool.
