= HMS Sabrina (1806) =

British ship

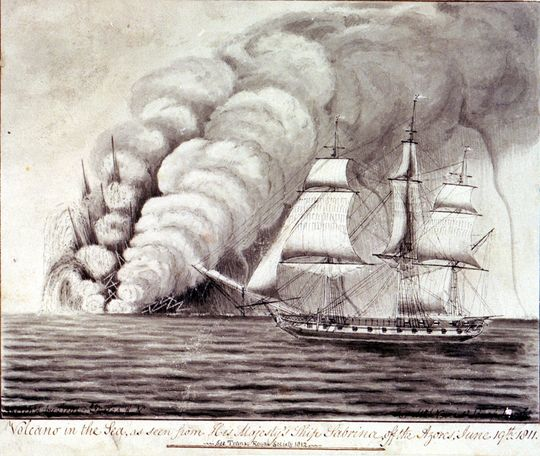
- Volcano in the Sea, as seen from His Majesty's Ship Sabrina, off the Azores, 19 June 1811, by Lt John William Miles

History

United Kingdom
- Name: HMS Sabrina
- Ordered: 12 July 1805
- Builder: Robert Adams, Chapel, Southampton
- Laid down: December 1805
- Launched: 1 September 1806
- Completed: 30 November 1806 at Portsmouth Dockyard
- Commissioned: September 1806
- Out of service: Sold 18 April 1816

General characteristics
- Class & type: 18-gun Cormorant-class sloop
- Tons burthen: 42642/94 (bm)
- Length: 108 ft 3 in (33.0 m) (overall); 90 ft 7 in (27.6 m) (keel)
- Beam: 29 ft 9 in (9.1 m)
- Depth of hold: 9 ft 0 1/2 in (2.76 m)
- Sail plan: Ship
- Complement: 121
- Armament: Upper deck: 16 × 32-pounder carronades; QD: 6 × 18-pounder carronades; Fc: 2 × 6-pounder long guns + 2 × 18-pounder carronades

HMS Sabrina was an 18-gun Royal Navy ship-sloop of the Cormorant-class, launched in 1806 at Southampton. She seems to have had a surprisingly uneventful career before the Admiralty sold her in 1816.

== Design ==
Sabrina was one of the second batch of Cormorant-class ship-sloops. As such she carried 32-pounder carronades in her main battery instead of 6-pounder guns. In 1810 she was reclassed as a 20-gun post-ship, and again re-rated as 24 guns in 1816, just before she was sold. Under the rating system of the day her number of guns could be largely nominal (in this case the number of long guns she would have carried had she been so-armed); the re-rating included her carronades in the total and did not involve any actual change to her armament.

== Service ==
Sabrina was commissioned under Commander Edward Kittoe in September 1806 and he sailed her to the Mediterranean on 4 January 1807. At some point, her boats and those of her squadron attacked a Spanish flotilla. A subsequent expedition saw her boats and those of Chiffonne cut out a brig and a schooner under the guns of a 4-gun battery on the south coast of Spain. On 20 November she and Euryalus were in company with Niger when Niger captured the Lady Washington.

In early 1809 Kittoe sailed Sabrina to Cartagena, Colombia, bringing the news that Spain and England had signed a peace. Some dual citizens (Anglo-Americans) held prisoner in Colombia asked him to intercede with the viceroy for their freedom, which he did, but to no avail, as they had been incarcerated at the behest of the Captain General of Caracas.

In 1809 she participated in the ill-fated Walcheren Campaign. At one point during the campaign, she served as the flagship for Admiral Keats. During the campaign Rear Admiral William Albany Ottway appointed Commander Abraham Lowe to take command of her.

On Sabrina's return to Britain, in January 1810 Lowe transferred to command of Diligence. Sabrina then came under the command of Commander James Tillard, who sailed her for Portugal on 20 July.

In October 1810 Sabrina escorted a convoy of transport ships from Oporto to Lisbon, transferring about 4000 French prisoners that Colonel Trant's raid captured at Coimbra.

Sabrina Island: During June and July 1811 a volcanic eruption in the sea formed a new island off São Miguel Island. Commander Tillard went ashore on 4 July and claimed the island for Great Britain, naming it Sabrina Island. He later wrote a description of what he had seen and done for the Philosophical Transactions of the Royal Society. The claiming of the island gave rise to considerable diplomatic wrangling that proved moot when the island subsided into the sea a few months later.

In November 1811 Captain the Honourable William Walpole took command and sailed Sabrina for Portugal on 19 November. On 30 December Sabrina and Vesta captured Princesa da Beira (or Princess Beira). A prize money notice, however, names Tillard as captain of Sabrina, which is inconsistent with Walpole having replaced Tillard in November.

On 13 January 1812, Sabrina and Vesta captured the slave schooner Pepe off the coast of Africa. (Note: A first class share of the prize money for Pepe and the bounty for slaves captured on Princess de Beira was worth £404 6s 7½d. A sixth-class share, that of an ordinary seaman, was worth £6 9s 11½d. However, £401 was retained by to meet expenses arising from appeals re the case of the Princess de Beira. Unfortunately, the prize agent, Henry Abbott, went bankrupt. It was not until May 1835 that a final dividend was paid from his estate. The Navy List also gives the date of capture for Pepe as 13 June 1812. a first class share of the final payment for Princess de Beira was worth £41 5s 6d; a sixth-class share was worth 33s 2¼d. A first-class share of the final payment for Pepe was worth £9 18s 9d; a sixth class share was worth 3s 2¼d.)

In May command passed to Captain Alexander R. MacKenzie, who sailed her to Portugal. In June she brought back to England Captain Samuel Hood Linzee of Union, who had been knifed by a seaman and was no longer well enough to command. Sabrina shared with many vessels in the proceeds of the detention on 5 August, of Asia. (Note: A first-class share was worth £9 10s 10d; a sixth-class share was worth 2s 6d.)

On 5 January 1813, Sabrina and Myrtle detained Edward and Albert. (Note: In the case of Myrtle a first-class share of the allocation of expenses of $1000 was worth £18 6s 2½d. A sixth-class share was worth 7s 5½d.)

== Fate ==
The Principal Officers and Commissioners of His Majesty's Navy offered the "Sabrina sloop, of 427 tons", lying at Deptford, for sale on 18 April. Sabrina was sold on 18 April 1816 at Portsmouth.
