= Keshan County =

Keshan County 克山县
- County
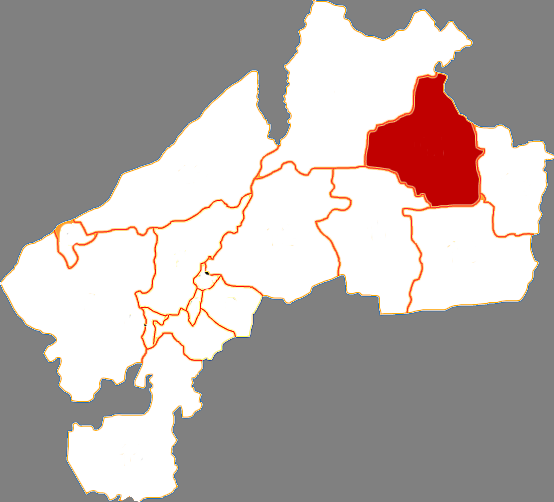
- Keshan in Qiqihar

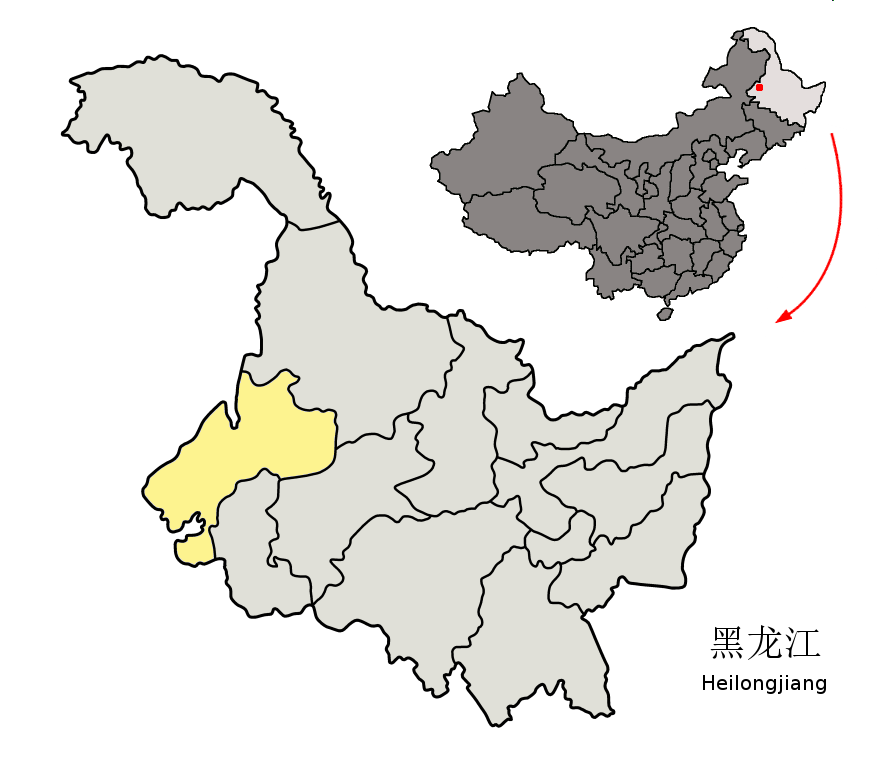
- Qiqihar in Heilongjiang
- Coordinates: 48°02′13″N 125°52′34″E
- Country: People's Republic of China
- Province: Heilongjiang
- Prefecture-level city: Qiqihar
- Township-level divisions: 2 towns 9 townships
- County seat: Keshan (克山镇)

Area
  - Total: 3,632 km^{2} (1,402 sq mi)
- Elevation: 223 m (732 ft)

Population
  - Total: 460,000
  - Density: 130/km^{2} (330/sq mi)
- Time zone: UTC+8 (China Standard)
- Postal code: 161610

Keshan (Chinese: 克山; pinyin: Kèshān) is a county in western Heilongjiang province, China, about 100 km (62 mi) northeast of Qiqihar, which administers it. It is named from a city-shaped extinct volcano, which has a name of Erkeshan in its territory. Its total area is 3,632 square kilometres (1,402 sq mi), with a population of 460,000. Post Code: 161610. The seat of Keshan County is located in Keshan Town.

== Geography and climate ==
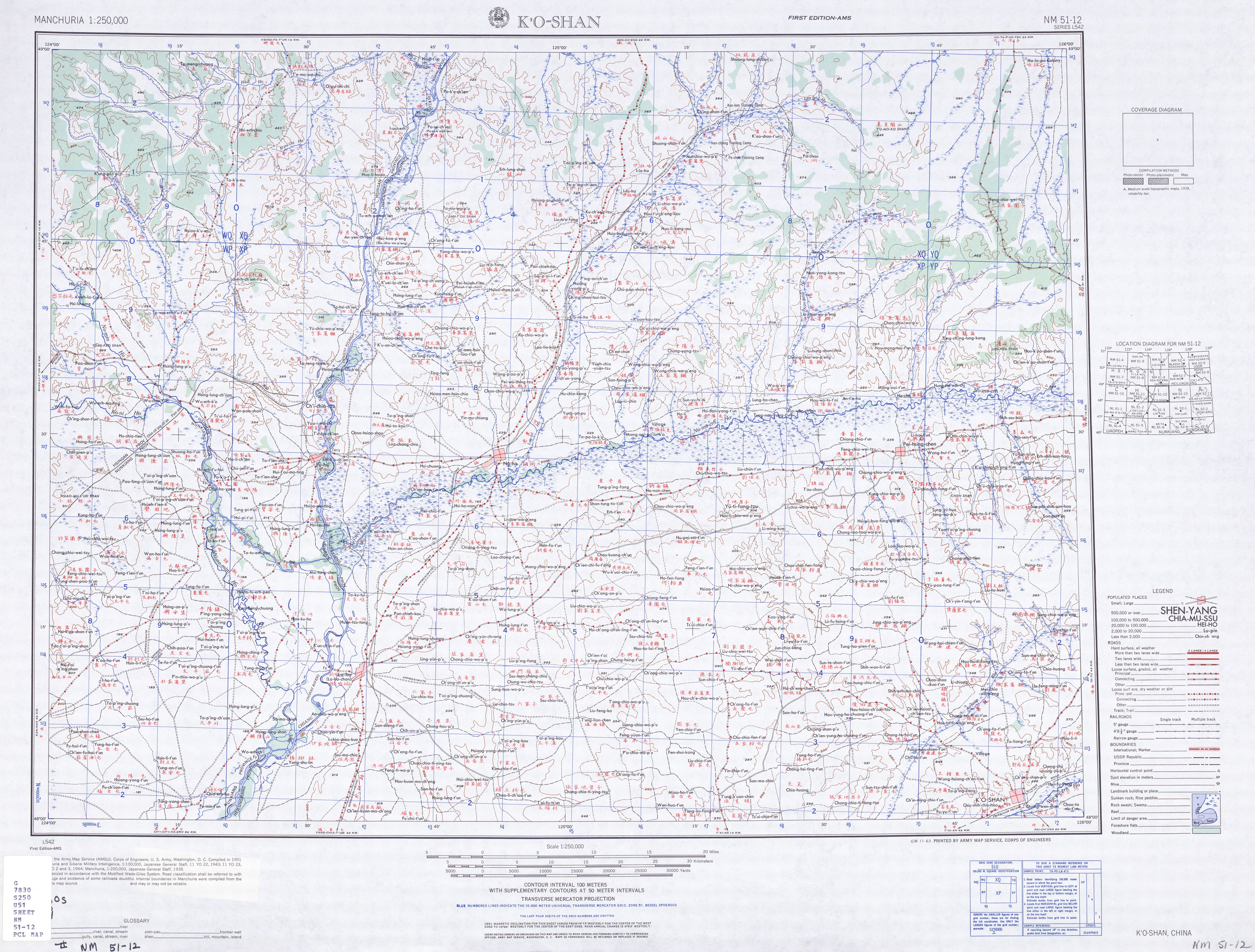
Map including Keshan (labeled as 克山 K'O-SHAN) (AMS, 1951)

Keshan has a humid continental climate (Köppen Dwa/Dwb), with long, bitterly cold, but dry winters, and humid, very warm summers. The monthly daily mean temperature in January, the coldest month, is −21.4 °C (−6.5 °F), and July, the warmest month, averages 22.0 °C (71.6 °F), with an average annual temperature +2.27 °C (36.1 °F). A majority of the annual precipitation falls in July and August alone. With monthly percent possible sunshine ranging from 54% in July to 71% in February, sunshine is abundant and the area receives 2,710 hours of bright sunshine annually.

Climate data for Keshan, elevation 291 m (955 ft), (1991–2020 normals, extremes 1971–2010)
Month	Jan	Feb	Mar	Apr	May	Jun	Jul	Aug	Sep	Oct	Nov	Dec	Year
Record high °C (°F)	−0.7 (30.7)	7.2 (45.0)	19.8 (67.6)	28.4 (83.1)	34.8 (94.6)	38.7 (101.7)	37.1 (98.8)	35.5 (95.9)	33.4 (92.1)	25.7 (78.3)	13.3 (55.9)	3.5 (38.3)	38.7 (101.7)
Mean daily maximum °C (°F)	−15.8 (3.6)	−9.8 (14.4)	0.2 (32.4)	11.7 (53.1)	20.3 (68.5)	25.6 (78.1)	27.3 (81.1)	25.3 (77.5)	19.8 (67.6)	10.1 (50.2)	−3.5 (25.7)	−14.1 (6.6)	8.1 (46.6)
Daily mean °C (°F)	−21.0 (−5.8)	−16.0 (3.2)	−5.6 (21.9)	5.7 (42.3)	14.1 (57.4)	20.0 (68.0)	22.4 (72.3)	20.2 (68.4)	13.8 (56.8)	4.3 (39.7)	−8.5 (16.7)	−18.8 (−1.8)	2.5 (36.6)
Mean daily minimum °C (°F)	−25.6 (−14.1)	−21.6 (−6.9)	−11.4 (11.5)	−0.3 (31.5)	7.7 (45.9)	14.3 (57.7)	17.8 (64.0)	15.6 (60.1)	8.3 (46.9)	−0.6 (30.9)	−12.8 (9.0)	−23.0 (−9.4)	−2.6 (27.3)
Record low °C (°F)	−42.4 (−44.3)	−37.8 (−36.0)	−30.0 (−22.0)	−15.0 (5.0)	−7.3 (18.9)	1.5 (34.7)	8.4 (47.1)	4.5 (40.1)	−6.1 (21.0)	−18.5 (−1.3)	−31.1 (−24.0)	−37.5 (−35.5)	−42.4 (−44.3)
Average precipitation mm (inches)	3.4 (0.13)	3.3 (0.13)	6.6 (0.26)	21.1 (0.83)	37.5 (1.48)	96.3 (3.79)	156.7 (6.17)	118.8 (4.68)	60.7 (2.39)	20.0 (0.79)	7.8 (0.31)	5.6 (0.22)	537.8 (21.18)
Average precipitation days (≥ 0.1 mm)	5.0	3.4	4.2	6.2	9.8	13.3	13.6	13.0	9.6	6.2	5.5	6.5	96.3
Average snowy days	8.1	5.8	6.9	4.4	0.2	0	0	0	0.1	2.9	8.3	9.4	46.1
Average relative humidity (%)	72	68	57	49	50	63	75	77	67	60	66	73	65
Mean monthly sunshine hours	168.2	202.0	247.6	235.5	252.2	249.0	241.8	236.5	231.6	204.0	170.0	150.2	2,588.6
Percentage possible sunshine	61	69	67	57	54	52	50	54	62	62	62	58	59
Source 1: China Meteorological Administration
Source 2: Weather China

== Administrative divisions ==
There are seven towns and eight townships in the county:

Towns:

- Keshan (克山镇), Beixing (北兴镇), Xicheng (西城镇), Gucheng (古城镇), Beilian (北联镇), Xihe (西河镇), Shuanghe (双河镇)

Townships:

- Henan Township (河南乡), Hebei Township (河北乡), Gubei Township (古北乡), Xilian Township (西联乡), Fazhan Township (发展乡), Xijian Township (西建乡), Xianghua Township (向华乡), Shuguang Township (曙光乡)
