= Henan Township, Heilongjiang =

Henan Township 河南乡
- Township
- Location in Heilongjiang Henan Township (China)
- Coordinates: 47°57′58″N 126°1′15″E
- Country: People's Republic of China
- Province: Heilongjiang
- Prefecture-level city: Qiqihar
- County: Keshan County
- Time zone: UTC+8 (China Standard)

Henan Township (simplified Chinese: 河南乡; traditional Chinese: 河南鄉; pinyin: Hénán Xiāng) is a township under the administration of Keshan County, in western Heilongjiang, China. As of 2020, it has nine villages under its administration:

- Xuexi Village (学习村)
- Erhe Village (二河村)
- Hua'an Village (华安村)
- Xingli Village (兴利村)
- Lianhe Village (联合村)
- Renfa Village (仁发村)
- Yongxing Village (永兴村)
- Gongzheng Village (公政村)
- Dahe Village (大河村)
