= HMS Vesta =

History

United Kingdom
- Name: HMS Vesta
- Ordered: 2 April 1804
- Builder: Bermuda
- Launched: 1806
- Commissioned: October 1806
- Fate: Sold 1816

United Kingdom
- Name: Sylvia
- Owner: 1818: W. Major.; 1822:Harrison
- Acquired: c.1816 by purchase
- Fate: Sunk May 1823

General characteristics
- Class & type: Adonis-class
- Tons burthen: 110 93/94, or 138 bm
- Length: 68 ft 2 in (20.8 m) (gundeck); 50 ft 5 5/8 in (15.4 m) (keel)
- Beam: 20 ft 4 in (6.2 m)
- Depth of hold: 10 ft 3 in (3.12 m)
- Sail plan: Schooner
- Complement: 35
- Armament: 10 × 18-pounder carronades

HMS Vesta was an Adonis-class schooner of the Royal Navy during the Napoleonic War. She was built at Bermuda using Bermudan cedar and completed in 1806. She appears to have had an astonishingly uneventful decade-long career before the Admiralty sold her in 1816. She became a merchantman, sailing between the United Kingdom and Newfoundland until May 1823 when she sank after hitting an iceberg.

== Career ==
Vesta was commissioned in August 1806 under the command of Lieutenant George Maule for the North America station. In November 1807 Lieutenant Charles Crowdy assumed command. His replacement in June 1808 was Lieutenant George Mends.

Lieutenant George Miall replaced Mends in July 1809. In 1810, Lieutenant William Bowen Mends briefly commanded Vesta before Miall returned to command. Between 18 June and 5 July 1811, Vesta underwent repairs at Plymouth.

Vesta then served briefly with the West Africa Squadron.

On 30 December Vesta and Sabrina captured Princessa de Beira (or Princess Beira) off Boa Vista, Cape Verde. Princessa de Beira was a United States schooner. The Vice admiralty court at Freetown condemned her, and freed the 56 slaves that she was carrying. The court ruled that Princessa was in fact U.S. and that her Portuguese colours were false.

Then on 13 January 1812, Vesta and Sabrina captured Pepe, a U.S.-owned slave schooner, in the River Gambia. The court in Sierra Leone condemned her and freed the 73 slaves she was carrying. The court ruled that despite her Spanish colours, Pepe was American and British property. In the seizure Captain Tillard of Sabrina used dubious means to induce the local slave merchant to add 64 slaves to the nine already aboard Pepe at the time of the seizure and so make the exercise more lucrative. (Note: A first class share of the prize money for Pepe and the bounty for slaves captured on Princess de Beira was worth £404 6s 7½d. A sixth-class share, that of an ordinary seaman, was worth £6 9s 11½d. However, £401 was retained by to meet expenses arising from appeals re the case of the Princess de Beira. Unfortunately, the prize agent, Henry Abbott, went bankrupt. It was not until May 1835 that a final dividend was paid from his estate. The Navy List also gives the date of capture for Pepe as 13 June 1812. A first class share of the final payment for Princess de Beira was worth £41 5s 6d; a sixth-class share was worth 13s 2¼d. A first-class share of the final payment for Pepe was worth £9 18s 9d; a sixth class share was worth 3s 2¼d.)

In February Vesta sailed to the Rio Pongas to attempt to capture four British subjects engaging in slave trading in violation of the law for the abolition of the slave trade. Miall managed to apprehend two and bring them back to Freetown.

Vesta then returned to England.

Lloyd's List (LL) reported on 12 February 1813 that the schooner Vesta had recaptured the English merchantman Hebe which a French privateer had captured off Cartagena, Spain, during a calm. Vesta brought Hebe into Gibraltar.

On 1 October 1813, Vesta recaptured the Spanish brig St. Francisco de Assis.

=== Disposal ===
In January 1816 the Admiralty put Vesta up for sale at Deptford. She was sold for £500 on 11 January 1816.

== Merchantman ==
Vesta appeared in the Register of Shipping for 1818 with Ford, master, and W. Major, owner.

Year	Master	Owner	Trade
1817 not published			Undergoing repair
1818	Ford	W. Major & Co.	Portsmouth-Newfoundland
1819	Ford	W. Major & Co.	Portsmouth-Newfoundland
1820	Ford	W. Major & Co.	Portsmouth-Newfoundland
1821	Ford	W. Major & Co.	Portsmouth-Newfoundland
1822	Ford; Andrews	W. Major & Co. Harrison	Portsmouth-Newfoundland
1823	Andrews	Harrison	Portsmouth-Newfoundland

== Loss ==
Vesta was sailing from Poole and Waterford to Carbonear when on 20 May 1823 she struck an iceberg about 100 miles east of Cape St Francis. The crew took to the boats and she sank almost immediately. About 30 hours later Elizabeth, Hearn, master, of Harbour Grace, came by and rescued the crew. Elizabeth was on a seal hunting voyage. She landed the crew a few days later at Musquito.
