= Heeb (surname) =

Heeb is a Germanic surname that may refer to

- Adolf Heeb (born 1940), Liechtenstein cyclist and politician
- Armando Heeb (born 1990), Liechtensteiner football player
- Barbara Heeb (born 1969), Swiss road racing cyclist
- Birgit Heeb-Batliner (born 1972), Liechtenstein alpine skier
- Franz Heeb (born 1948), Liechtenstein politician
- Lorenz Heeb (born 1949), Liechtenstein singer and politician
- Martin Heeb (born 1969), Liechtenstein football player
- Carmen Heeb-Kindle (born 1985), Liechtenstein teacher and politician
