= HMS Hebe =

Five ships of the Royal Navy have been named HMS Hebe, after the Greek goddess Hebe.

- HMS Hebe (1782) was a French 38-gun frigate captured in 1782, renamed Blonde in 1805, and broken up in 1811.
- HMS Hebe (1804) was a 32-gun fifth rate in service from 1804 to 1813. Because Hebe served in the navy's Egyptian campaign (8 March to 8 September 1801), her officers and crew qualified for the clasp "Egypt" to the Naval General Service Medal, which the Admiralty issued in 1847 to all surviving claimants. (Note: A first-class share of the prize money awarded in April 1823 was worth £34 2s 4d; a fifth-class share, that of a seaman, was worth 3s 11½d. The amount was small as the total had to be shared between 79 vessels and the entire army contingent.)
- HMS Hebe (1826) was a 46-gun Leda-class frigate launched in 1826, made a receiving ship in 1839, hulked in 1861, and broken up 1873.
- HMS Hebe (1892) was an Alarm-class torpedo gunboat launched in 1892, converted to a minesweeper in 1909, and sold 1919.
- HMS Hebe (J24) was a Halcyon-class minesweeper launched in 1936 and sunk by a mine off Bari in November 1943.

== See also ==
- Hebe (1804 ship) was launched at Leith. For eight years she served the Royal Navy as a hired armed ship and transport. Her contract lasted from 27 April 1804 to 30 October 1812. She spent her entire naval career escorting convoys to the Baltic. She became a transport that an American privateer captured in March 1814.
