= HMS Trollope =

Frigate of the Royal Navy

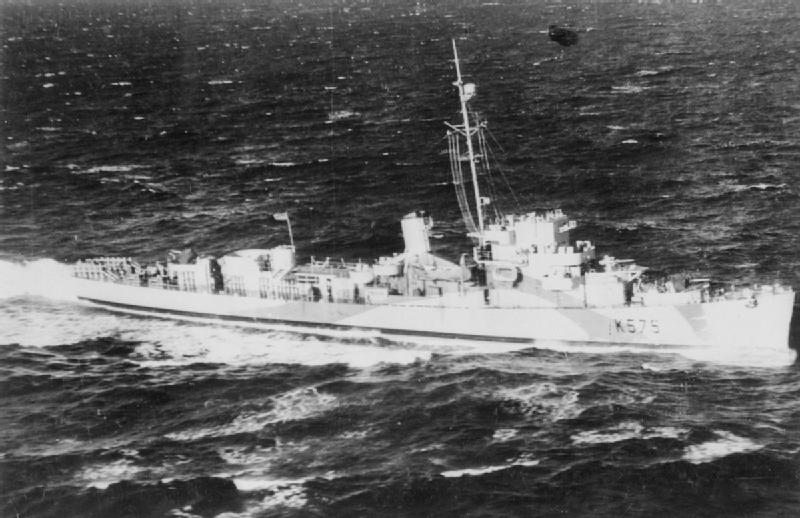
- HMS Trollope photographed during World War II by an aircraft operating from Royal Naval Air Station HMS Osprey, Dunoon, Scotland.

History

United States
- Name: unnamed (DE-566)
- Builder: Bethlehem-Hingham Shipyard, Hingham, Massachusetts
- Laid down: 29 September 1943
- Launched: 20 November 1943
- Completed: 10 January 1944
- Commissioned: never
- Fate: Transferred to United Kingdom 10 January 1944
- Acquired: Returned by United Kingdom 10 October 1944
- Stricken: 13 November 1944
- Fate: Sold 9 January 1947 for scrapping; Scrapped 1951

United Kingdom
- Namesake: Admiral Sir Henry Trollope (1756-1839), British naval officer who was commanding officer of HMS Russell at the Battle of Camperdown in 1797
- Acquired: 10 January 1944
- Commissioned: 10 January 1944
- Fate: Constructive total loss 6 July 1944; Returned to United States 10 October 1944

General characteristics
- Class & type: Captain-class frigate
- Displacement: 1,400 long tons (1,422 t)
- Length: 306 ft (93 m)
- Beam: 36.75 ft (11.2 m)
- Draught: 9 ft (2.7 m)
- Propulsion: Two Foster-Wheeler Express "D"-type water-tube boilers; GE 13,500 shp (10,070 kW) steam turbines and generators (9,200 kW); Electric motors for 12,000 shp (8,900 kW); Two shafts
- Speed: 24 knots (44 km/h)
- Range: 5,500 nautical miles (10,200 km) at 15 knots (28 km/h)
- Complement: 186
- Sensors & processing systems: SA & SL type radars; Type 144 series Asdic; MF Direction Finding antenna; HF Direction Finding Type FH 4 antenna
- Armament: 3 × 3 in (76 mm) /50 Mk.22 guns; 1 × twin Bofors 40 mm mount Mk.I; 7–16 × 20 mm Oerlikon guns; Mark 10 Hedgehog antisubmarine mortar; Depth charges; QF 2-pounder naval gun
- Notes: Pennant number K575

HMS Trollope (K575) was a British Captain class frigate of the Royal Navy in commission during World War II. Originally constructed as a United States Navy Buckley class destroyer escort, she served in the Royal Navy from January to July 1944, when she was lost.

== Construction and transfer ==
The ship was laid down as the unnamed U.S. Navy destroyer escort DE-566 by Bethlehem-Hingham Shipyard, Inc., in Hingham, Massachusetts, on 29 September 1943 and launched on 20 November 1943. She was transferred to the Royal Navy upon completion on 10 January 1944.

== Service history ==
Commissioned into service in the Royal Navy as the frigate HMS Trollope (K575) on 10 January 1944 simultaneously with her transfer, the ship served on patrol and escort duty in the English Channel and supported the invasion of Normandy.

On 6 July 1944, Trollope either ran aground near Arromanches-les-Bains, France, or was torpedoed by a German S-boat – known to the Allies as "E-boat" – motor torpedo boat off Cap d'Antifer, France, according to different sources.

At approximately 01:30 on 6 July 1944, Trollope was struck by 3 torpedoes launched by a German E-boat, breaking the vessel in two. The front part of the vessel detached and drifted, presenting a risk to other Allied vessels in the area. This was sunk, tactically, by Allied forces. The rear of the vessel was towed towards Arromanches-les-Bains by a US tug boat, where it was run aground allowing servicemen still on board to be rescued. Source of this information was from one of those servicemen rescued.

Trollope was declared a constructive total loss. The Royal Navy returned her to the U.S. Navy on 10 October 1944.

== Disposal ==
The U.S. Navy struck Trollope from its Naval Vessel Register on 13 November 1944. She was sold on 9 January 1947 to John Lee of Belfast, Northern Ireland, for scrapping, and was scrapped in Scotland in 1951.
