= French frigate Vénus (1782) =

- Proserpine, sister-ship of Vénus

History

Kingdom of France
- Name: Vénus
- Namesake: Venus
- Builder: Brest
- Laid down: November 1781
- Launched: 14 July 1782
- Commissioned: October 1782
- Fate: Wrecked on 31 December 1788 in the Indian Ocean

General characteristics
- Class & type: Hébé-class frigate
- Displacement: 1,350 tonneaux
- Tons burthen: 700 port tonneaux
- Length: 46.3 m (152 ft)
- Beam: 11.9 m (39 ft)
- Draught: 5.5 m (18 ft)
- Complement: 297
- Armament: 26 x long 18-pounders; 8 x long 8-pounders

Vénus was a 38-gun Hébé-class frigate of the French Navy.

In the summer of 1782, Vénus operated as a transport between Rochefort and Île de Ré. She served in Martinique during the American War of Independence.

From 1785 to 1788, Vénus undertook a scientific expedition in the Indian Ocean, under Captain de Rossily.

Vénus was wrecked in a storm on her way back to France, on 31 December 1788
