= 32-pounder =

A 32-pounder is a gun firing a shot of 32 pounds weight, a mass of 15 kg.

Examples include:

- Naval artillery in the Age of Sail
- 32-pounder gun - a smooth-bore muzzle-loading gun firing 32-pound shot, c. 1500 – c. 1880
- 32-pounder 56 cwt - a large-caliber British naval gun of the 1790–1830 era
- 32-pounder long gun (demi-cannon) - a large-caliber British naval gun of the 1700s
- Dahlgren gun#Thirty-two-pounder - American naval guns of the mid-19th century
- M1844 32-pounder howitzer - a U.S. Army muzzle-loading smoothbore of the American Civil War era
- Ordnance QF 32-pounder - a prototype British anti-tank gun of the Second World War
- SBBL 32-pounder - a breech-loading gun converted from older 42 cwt muzzle-loading 32-pounders, late 19th century
