= HEB =

Heb or HEB may refer to:

== Businesses ==
- H-E-B, a supermarket chain in the US and Mexico
- Heinemann Educational Books (HEB), UK publishing company
- Hemispherx Biopharma, a pharmaceutical company

== Places ==
- Hebei, a province of China (Guobiao abbreviation HEB)
- The neighboring cities of Hurst, Euless and Bedford within the Mid-Cities area of the Dallas-Fort Worth Metroplex, Texas, United States

== Government ==
- Hurst-Euless-Bedford Independent School District, Texas, United States, serving the three aforementioned cities
- Hindu Endowments Board, Singapore

== Technologies ==
- Volkswagen Type 14A (Hebmüller Cabriolet), an automobile
- Hot electron bolometer, a type of bolometer
- HEB – European type of I-beam

== Other uses ==
- Epistle to the Hebrews (Heb.), a New Testament book
- Hebrew language (ISO 639-2:heb)
- High energy biscuits
- New Hebrides national football team
