= Hebei Township, Heilongjiang =

Hebei Township 河北乡
- Township
- Location in Heilongjiang Hebei Township (China)
- Coordinates: 48°6′24″N 125°55′53″E
- Country: People's Republic of China
- Province: Heilongjiang
- Prefecture-level city: Qiqihar
- County: Keshan County
- Time zone: UTC+8 (China Standard)

Hebei Township (simplified Chinese: 河北乡; traditional Chinese: 河北鄉; pinyin: Héběi Xiāng) is a township under the administration of Keshan County, in western Heilongjiang, China. As of 2020, it has nine villages under its administration:

- Xinda Village (新大村)
- Xinjian Village (新建村)
- Xinnong Village (新农村)
- Xin'an Village (新安村)
- Xincheng Village (新成村)
- Xinzhong Village (新中村)
- Xinqi Village (新启村)
- Xinsheng Village (新生村)
- Xinmin Village (新民村)
