= Hebei, Luobei County =

Hebei 鹤北镇
- Town
- Location in Heilongjiang Hebei (China)
- Coordinates: 47°33′21″N 130°26′46″E
- Country: People's Republic of China
- Province: Heilongjiang
- Prefecture-level city: Hegang
- County: Luobei County
- Time zone: UTC+8 (China Standard)

Hebei (simplified Chinese: 鹤北; traditional Chinese: 鶴北; pinyin: Hèběi) is a town under the administration of Luobei County, Heilongjiang, China. As of 2020, it has five residential neighborhoods and the following ten villages under its administration:

- Fendou Village (奋斗村)
- Shuangsheng Village (双胜村)
- Jiulizhuang Village (九里庄村)
- Senshan Village (森山村)
- Xinhe Village (新鹤村)
- Changsheng Village (常胜村)
- Zhenxing Village (振兴村)
- Jinshan Village (金山村)
- Yunshanhe Village (云山合村)
- Sanshuang Village (三双村)
