= Hebe Reef =

- Reef
- Location within Tasmania Location within Australia
- Coordinates: 41°03′20″S 146°43′53″E
- Location: Tasmania, Australia

Hebe Reef is a reef located about 5 kilometres (3.1 mi) northwest of the mouth of the Tamar River in Tasmania, Australia. Part of the reef is visible at low tide, however it is completely submerged at middle and high tide.

Hebe Reef's unsuspected location in the middle of what one would believe to be the channel to the river has deceived many, and numerous ships have been wrecked on its rocks.

== Name ==
Hebe Reef was named after the first ship that struck the reef, Hebe. Hebe was "a full-rigged ship of 250 tons built at Chittagong, India in 1804". The ship departed from Madras, India in late March 1808 and was destined for Sydney; when the decision was made on 15 June to turn into George Town, Tasmania - then Port Dalrymple - Hebe struck the reef due to a mixture of lack of knowledge and bad weather.

One person on the ship died, and most of its fittings and cargo were salvaged and sold in Sydney.

Ever since, the reef has been known as Hebe Reef.

== Shipwrecks ==
There have been a total of six shipwrecks on Hebe Reef:

Date	Ship	Departed	Destined for
15 June 1808	Hebe	Madras	Sydney
24 January 1851	Phillip Oakden	London	Exeter
8 June 1883	Asterope	London	Launceston
24 April 1886	Esk	Hobart	Sydney
6 January 1907	Eden Holme	Hobart	Launceston
10 July 1995	Iron Baron	Port Kembla	Bell Bay
