= Hebei, Shaanxi =

Hebei 河北镇
- Town
- Location in China
- Coordinates: 34°59′32″N 106°57′6″E
- Country: People's Republic of China
- Province: Shaanxi
- Prefecture-level city: Baoji
- County: Long County
- Time zone: UTC+8 (China Standard)

Hebei (Chinese: 河北; pinyin: Héběi) is a town under the administration of Long County, Shaanxi, China. As of 2020, it has eight villages under its administration:

- Dongpo Village (东坡村)
- Lanjiapu Village (兰家堡村)
- Quanjiaxia Village (权家下村)
- Qijiayuan Village (歧家塬村)
- Xiliangwan Village (西凉湾村)
- Baishi Village (白石村)
- Weijiapu Village (韦家堡村)
- Miaopo Village (庙坡村)
