= Armando Heeb =

Liechtensteiner footballer (born 1990)

Personal information
- Full name: Armando Heeb
- Date of birth: 25 September 1990 (age 36)
- Place of birth: Vaduz, Liechtenstein
- Height: 1.85 m (6 ft 1 in)
- Position: Midfielder

Team information
- Current team: FC Buchs
- Number: 18

Youth career
- 1999–2003: FC Sevelen
- 2003–2007: FC Vaduz

Senior career*
Years	Team	Apps	(Gls)
2007–2009	FC Schaan		
2009–2011	FC Buchs		
2011–2012	Eschen/Mauren	5	(0)
2012–2013	FC Balzers II		
2013–2014	FC Vaduz II		
2015–2017	FC Balzers	2	(0)
2017–2019	Chur 97	39	(5)
2019–	FC Buchs		

International career^{‡}
2006	Liechtenstein U17	2	(0)
2008	Liechtenstein U19	1	(0)
2009–2012	Liechtenstein U21	10	(0)
2015	Liechtenstein	1	(0)
- * Club domestic league appearances and goals as of 26 June 2023 ‡ National team caps and goals as of 4 April 2015

Armando Heeb (born 25 September 1990) is a Liechtensteiner footballer who currently plays for Swiss club FC Buchs.

== Career ==
=== Club career ===
In the summer 2019, Heeb returned to FC Buchs for a second spell at the club.

=== International career ===
He is a member of the Liechtenstein national football team, making his debut in a friendly against San Marino on 31 March 2015. Heeb also made 10 appearances for the Liechtenstein U21 team between 2009 and 2012.
