= Hebei Subdistrict, Ya'an =

Hebei Subdistrict 河北街道
- Subdistrict
- Location in Sichuan
- Coordinates: 29°59′21″N 103°0′19″E
- Country: People's Republic of China
- Province: Sichuan
- Prefecture-level city: Ya'an
- District: Yucheng District
- Time zone: UTC+8 (China Standard)

Hebei Subdistrict (Chinese: 河北街道; pinyin: Héběi Jiēdào) is a subdistrict in Yucheng District, Ya'an, Sichuan province, China. As of 2020, it has five residential communities and two villages under its administration.

- Tingjin Road Community (挺进路社区)
- Nan'er Road Community (南二路社区)
- Kangzang Road Community (康藏路社区)
- Doudan Community (斗胆社区)
- Shaxi Community (沙溪社区)
- Hongxing Village (红星村)
- Lianping Village (联坪村)

== See also ==
- List of township-level divisions of Sichuan
