= Hebei Township, Liaoning =

Hebei Township 河北乡
- Township
- Location in Liaoning
- Coordinates: 41°53′37″N 123°56′15″E
- Country: People's Republic of China
- Province: Liaoning
- Prefecture-level city: Fushun
- District: Shuncheng District
- Time zone: UTC+8 (China Standard)

Hebei Township (simplified Chinese: 河北乡; traditional Chinese: 河北鄉; pinyin: Héběi Xiāng) is a township under the administration of Shuncheng District, Fushun, Liaoning, China. As of 2020, it administers Dishuiwan Residential Community (滴水湾社区) and the following fourteen villages:

- Donghua Village (东华村)
- Fangxiao Village (方晓村)
- Liren Village (里仁村)
- Liandao Village (莲岛村)
- Gujiazi Village (孤家子村)
- Huangqi Village (黄旗村)
- Sijiazi Village (四家子村)
- Gongjia Village (龚家村)
- Beiguan New Village (北关新村)
- Xinqu Village (新区村)
- Xige Village (西戈村)
- Yingshi Village (英石村)
- Gebu Village (戈布村)
- Oujia Village (欧家村)
