= Hebe (1809 Hull ship) =

British merchantman and whaler 1809–1821

History

United Kingdom
- Name: Hebe
- Builder: Thomas Steemson, Paull, Hull
- Launched: 24 November 1809
- Fate: Wrecked 10 March 1821

General characteristics
- Tons burthen: 362 (bm)
- Armament: 12 × 9-pounder guns (1813)

Hebe was launched at Hull in 1809. She initially sailed as a West Indiaman, but then sailed to the Mediterranean. In 1813 a privateer captured her but the Royal Navy quickly recaptured her. Between 1816 and 1819 she made two voyages to India, sailing under a license from the British East India Company (EIC). On her return new owners sailed her as a whaler. She was wrecked on 10 March 1821 on her second whaling voyage to the British northern whale fishery.

== Merchantman ==
Hebe first appeared in the Register of Shipping (RS) in 1810 sailing as West Indiaman. She first appeared in Lloyd's Register (LR) in 1811 sailing to Malta.

Year	Master	Owner	Trade	Source & notes
1810	T.Allison	Staniforth	London–West Indies	RS
1811	T.Allison; G.Orton	Staniforth	London–West Indies; London–Malta	RS; damages repaired 1811
1811	G.Orron	Staniforth	London–Malta	LR

Hebe, Orton, master, returned with the fleet from Jamaica on 19 July 1811. She had arrived there on 12 May. She sailed from Gravesend for Malta on 22 September. On 13 April 1812 she was at Cadiz, having come from Salonica. On 19 June she arrived back at Gravesend from Cadiz. On 20 August she was at Gibraltar, having come from London.

On 19 January 1813 Hebe, Orton, master, was returning from the Currant (Ionian) Islands when a large French privateer attacked near Minorca. Hebe repelled the attack but afterwards a French privateer captured her near Cartagena, Spain, during a calm. The schooner HMS Vesta recaptured Hebe and brought her into Gibraltar. Hebe arrived at Gravesend from Zante on 25 April.

By 3 October 1813 Hebe, Orton, master, was back at Malta. From there she sailed to Smyrna. She arrived back at Gravesend on 27 June 1814.

In 1813 the EIC had lost its monopoly on the trade between India and Britain. British ships were then free to sail to India or the Indian Ocean under a license from the EIC. In 1815 Staniforth put Hebe into the East India trade.

Year	Master	Owner	Trade	Source & notes
1816	F.Reynolds; Thompson	Staniforth	Hull–London; Hull–India	LR
1817	Thompson; Sugden	Staniforth	Hull–India	LR

India voyages:

- T.Thompson sailed for Bengal on 28 July 1816 and returned in October 1817
- J.Sugden sailed for India on 17 April 1818 and returned on 5 September 1819

On Hebe's return Staniforth sole her. Her new owners decided to sail as a Hull-based whaler in the British Northern Whale Fishery.

Year	Master	Owner	Trade	Source & notes
1820	J.Sugden; T.Cousins	J.Staniforth; Hewitson	London–Calcutta	LR
1821	J.Cousens	Hewitson	Hull–Davis Straits	LR; repairs 1821 & 1821

== Whaler ==
In 1820 Captain Cousens (or Couzens), sailed Hebe to the Davis Strait. There she killed 19 whales, which rendered into 240 tuns of whale oil.

== Fate ==
Hebe was wrecked on 10 March 1821 near Aberdeen with the loss of five of her crew. She was outward bound on a voyage from Hull to Davis Strait. One of her crew wrote a letter to his wife with his account of the wrecking. That year 13 whalers were lost, including Hebe. (Note: Ten were lost in Davis Strait, one of them being Harmony.)
