= Hebe (1804 ship) =

History

United Kingdom
- Name: Hebe
- Namesake: Hebe (mythology)
- Builder: Leith
- Launched: 1804
- Captured: 1814

General characteristics
- Tons burthen: 266, or 267, or 26787/94 (bm)
- Armament: Hired armed ship:18 × 18-pounder carronades + 2 × 6-pounder guns; 1813:14 × 18-pounder carronades; 1814:2 × 6-pounder guns

Hebe was launched in 1804 at Leith. From 27 April 1804 to 30 October 1812 she served the Royal Navy as a hired armed ship and transport. She spent her entire naval career escorting convoys to the Baltic. Afterwards, she became a transport that an American privateer captured in March 1814.

== Career ==
Hebe first appeared in Lloyd's Register (LR) in 1804.

Year	Master	Owner	Trade	Source
1804	T.Bishop	Strachan	Leith transport	LR
1805	Bishop	Strachan	Leith: government service	RS

In February 1804 she escorted seven whalers from Leith, bound for Davis Strait and the British northern whale fishery. One was Rattler.

From August 1807 Hebe formed part of Admiral Gambier's inshore squadron for the second battle of Copenhagen. On 23 August, Hebe was part of the advance squadron, which took up position near the entrance to the harbour. An engagement of four hours ensued between the squadron and the Danes, who marshaled the Crown Battery, floating batteries, three praams of 20 guns each, some 30 gunboats, and block ships. The shallowness of the water prevent the Royal Navy from bringing in any large ships to support the advance squadron of brigs, sloops, and ketches. Eventually the British withdrew.

Year	Master	Owner	Trade	Source
1813	T.Bishop; J.Strachan	Strachan	Leith transport	LR
1814	J.Strachan	Strachan	Leith–London	LR

== Fate ==
Hebe was captured in 1814. In March the American privateer Surprize captured Hebe, of Leith, which had been carrying naval stores from Halifax, Nova Scotia to Bermuda. (Note: Surprize was a schooner of 302 tons (bm), commissioned in Baltimore. She was armed with 10 guns and had a crew of 120 men under the command of Captain Clement Cathell. On her first cruize, under Cathell's command, she captured 41 British vessels, of which 11 arrived in American ports.)

A US newspaper story reported that Hebe had been carrying coal, lumber, etc., and that Surprize, of Baltimore, had sent her into a southern port. Surprize was three days out of the Chesapeake when she captured Hebe.

Hebe arrived at North Carolina. LR for 1815 carried the annotation "captured" beneath her name.
