= RFA Hebe =

Lead ship of her class of stores freighter of the Royal Fleet Auxiliary

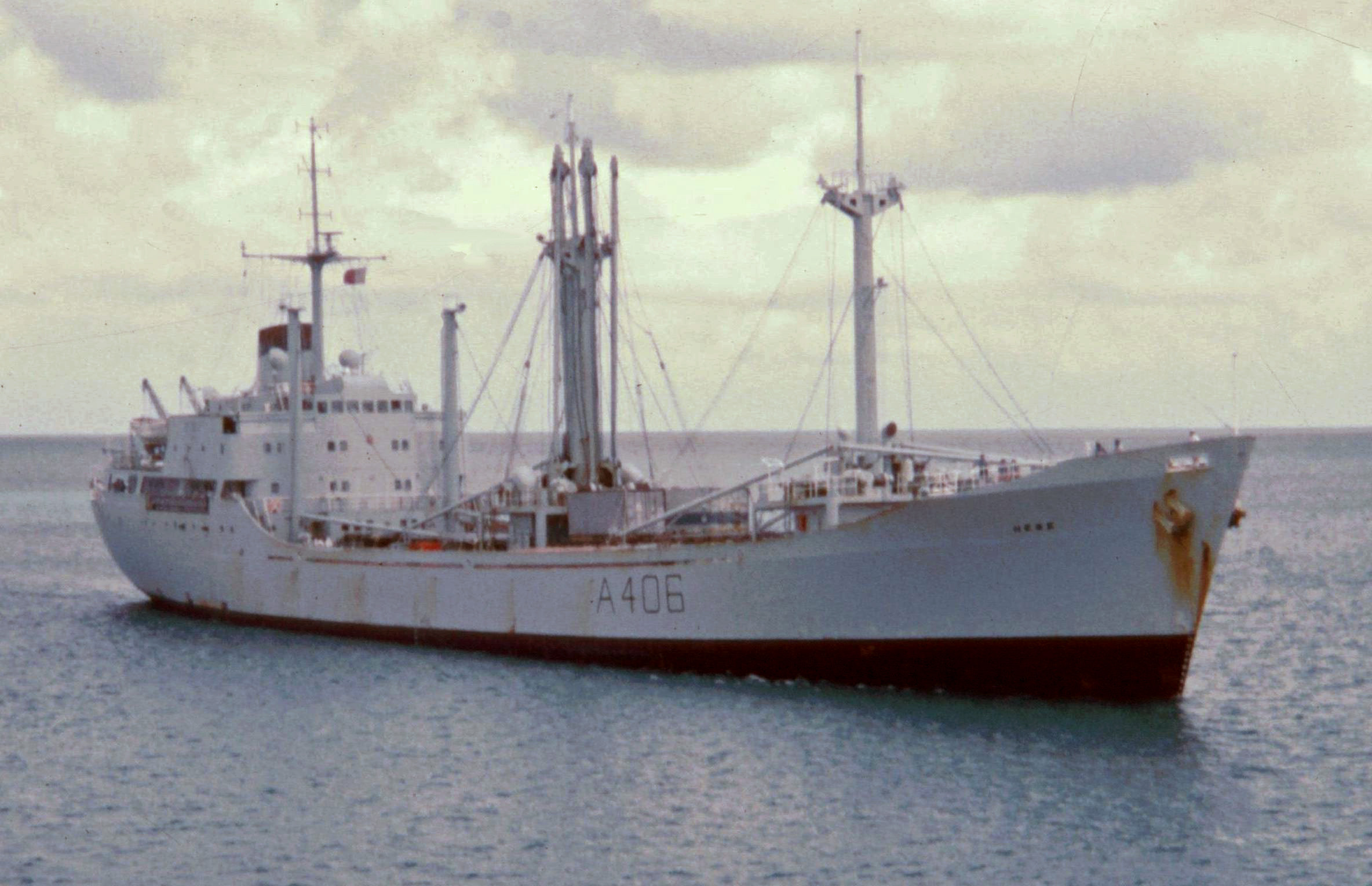
- RFA Hebe

History

United Kingdom
- Name: RFA Hebe
- Namesake: Hebe
- Builder: Henry Robb, Leith
- Laid down: 18 April 1961
- Launched: 7 March 1962
- Commissioned: 6 April 1962
- Decommissioned: December 1978
- Identification: IMO number: 5145013; Pennant number: A406
- Fate: Scrapped in Cyprus 1987

General characteristics
- Tonnage: 4,823 gross register tons (GRT)
- Displacement: 8,173 long tons (8,304 t)
- Length: 379 ft 3 in (115.60 m)
- Beam: 55 ft 2 in (16.81 m)
- Draught: 22 ft (6.7 m)
- Propulsion: Swan Hunter-Sulzer SRD68 5-cylinder diesel engine, 5,500 bhp (4,101 kW)
- Speed: 15 knots (28 km/h; 17 mph)
- Range: 630 tons fuel oil, 18 tons per day maximum
- Complement: 36 (accommodation for 54)

RFA Hebe (A406) was a stores ship of the Royal Fleet Auxiliary (RFA). Hebe was built by Henry Robb of Leith for the British-India Steam Navigation Company and was bare-boat chartered to the RFA in 1962.

Hebe was severely damaged by a fire while at Gibraltar on 30 November 1978. The charter was cancelled and the ship returned to her owners. Hebe was renamed Good Guardian in June 1979, and sailed from Gibraltar on 13 June 1979 for repairs in Greece. She was renamed Guardian in 1981, and Wafa in 1987. The ship arrived at Famagusta for demolition on 16 September 1987.
