= USS Hebe =

Patrol vessel of the United States Navy

History

United States
- Name: USS Hebe
- Namesake: Previous name retained
- Builder: George Bishop, Patchogue, New York
- Completed: 1912
- Acquired: 19 May 1917
- Commissioned: 1 August 1917
- Fate: Returned to owner 14 December 1918
- Notes: Operated as private motorboat Hebe 1912-1917 and from 1918

General characteristics
- Type: Patrol vessel
- Tonnage: 19 Gross register tons
- Displacement: 20 tons
- Length: 52 ft (16 m)
- Beam: 15 ft 7 in (4.75 m)
- Draft: 3 ft (0.91 m)
- Speed: 9 knots
- Armament: 1 × machine gun

USS Hebe (SP-966) was a United States Navy patrol vessel in commission from 1917 to 1918.

Hebe was built as a private motorboat of the same name in 1912 by George Bishop at Patchogue on Long Island, New York. On 19 May 1917, the U.S. Navy leased her from her owner, Edwin Thome of New York City, for use as a section patrol boat during World War I. She was commissioned at the New York Navy Yard in Brooklyn, New York, as USS Hebe (SP-966) on 1 August 1917.

Assigned to the 3rd Naval District and based at Sayville, New York, Hebe patrolled the Great South Bay and Fire Island region of southern Long Island through the end of World War I.

Hebe was returned to Thome on 14 December 1918.
