= Hébé-class frigate =

- HMS Amelia, ex-Proserpine

Class overview
- Name: Hébé class
- Builders: Saint-Malo, Brest and Toulon
- Operators: French Navy; Royal Navy
- Preceded by: Pourvoyeuse class
- Succeeded by: Danaé class
- Planned: 6
- Completed: 6
- Lost: 3
- Retired: 3

General characteristics
- Type: Frigate
- Displacement: 1,350 tonneaux
- Tons burthen: 700 port tonneaux
- Length: 46.3 m (152 ft)
- Beam: 11.9 m (39 ft)
- Draught: 5.5 m (18 ft)
- Sail plan: Ship-rigged
- Complement: 297
- Armament: 26 long 18-pounder guns (later increased to 28); 12 long 8-pounder guns; 4 36-pounder obusiers

The Hébé class was a class of six 38-gun (later 40-gun) frigates of the French Navy, designed in 1781 by Jacques-Noël Sané. The name ship of the class. Hébé, was also the basis for the British Leda-class frigates after the ship had been captured.

== Ships in class ==
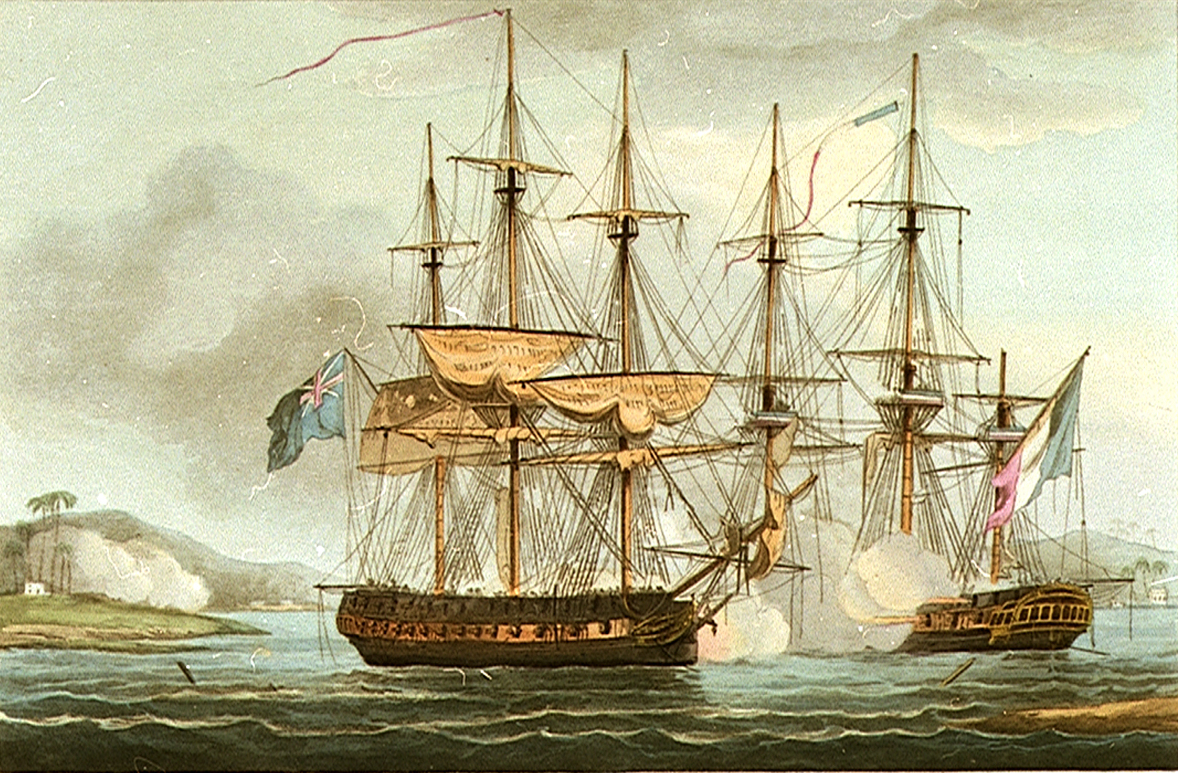
Sybille vs. Chiffonne

Name	Builder	Laid down	Launched	Completed	Fate
Hébé	Saint Malo	December 1781	25 June 1782	August 1782	Captured by British Navy in the action of 4 September 1782. The British took her into service and in 1805 renamed her HMS Blonde. Hébé became the model for the British Leda-class frigates, the first of which was HMS Leda. Hébé, therefore, has the rare distinction of being the model for both a French and a British frigate class.
Vénus	Brest	November 1781	14 July 1782	October 1782	Wrecked on 31 December 1788 in the Indian Ocean.
Dryade	Saint Malo	1782	3 February 1783	April 1783	Retired in 1796; condemned 16 November 1801 and taken to pieces.
Proserpine	Brest	December 1784	25 June 1785	August 1785	Captured by British Navy on 13 June 1796. The British took her into service as HMS Amelia.
Sibylle	Toulon	April 1790	30 July 1791	May 1792	Captured by British Navy on 17 June 1794. The British took her into service as HMS Sybille.
Carmagnole	La Motte, Brest	March 1792	22 May 1793	July 1793	Renamed Rassurante 30 May 1795, but reverted to Carmagnole 24 February 1798; wrecked in a storm at Vlissingen on 9 November 1800.
