= French frigate Hébé (1782) =

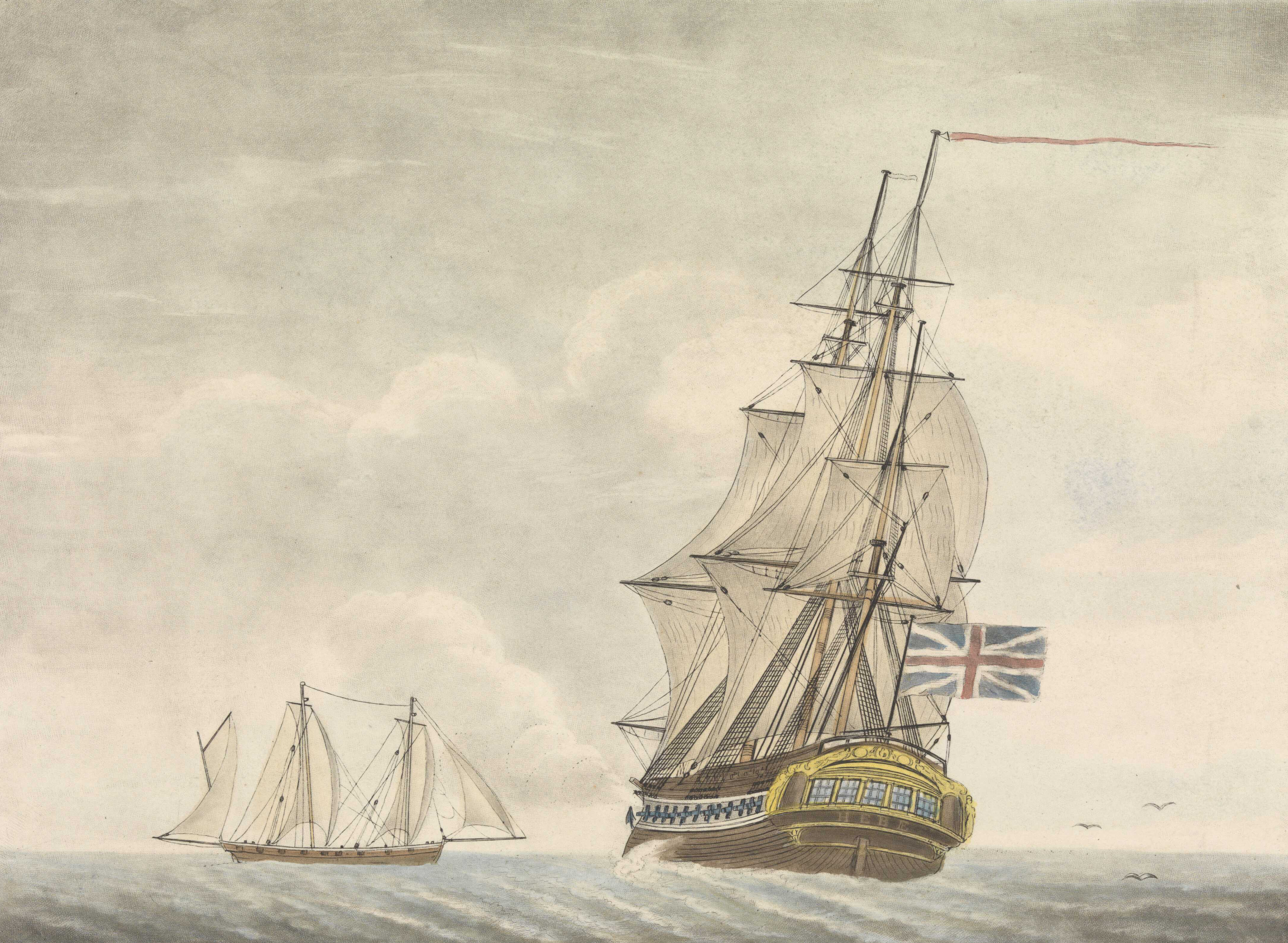
- Hebe (right) in 1795

History

Kingdom of France
- Name: Hébé
- Namesake: Hebe
- Builder: Saint Malo
- Laid down: December 1781
- Launched: 25 June 1782
- Commissioned: August 1782
- Captured: Captured by the Royal Navy in the action of 4 September 1782

Great Britain
- Name: HMS Hebe
- Acquired: 1782 by purchase of a prize
- Renamed: HMS Blonde (1805)
- Fate: Broken up June 1811

General characteristics
- Class & type: Hébé-class frigate
- Displacement: 1,350 tonneaux
- Tons burthen: 700 port tonneaux; 1782: 10717/94; 1790: 106252/94
- Length: 46.3 m (152 ft)
- Beam: 11.9 m (39 ft)
- Draught: 5.5 m (18 ft)
- Complement: 297
- Armament: French navy: 26 × long 18-pounder + *8 × long 8-pounder guns; Royal Navy; Upper deck: 28 × 18-pounder guns; QD: 1782: 8 × 9-pounder guns; 1805: 6 × 32-pounder carronades; Fc: 1782: 2 × 9-pounder guns; 1805: 2 × 32-pounder carronades

Hébé was a 38-gun Hébé-class frigate of the French Navy. The lead ship of her class, she was captured by the Royal Navy at the action of 4 September 1782 and taken into British service as HMS Hebe before being renamed as HMS Blonde in 1805. She was decommissioned in 1810 and broken up in 1811.

== French Navy career ==
Hébé's first commander was Captain Joseph Pierre de Vigny, (Note: Joseph Pierre de Vigny (1742–1812). His elder brother Léon Pierre (1737–1816), chevalier de Vigny, was also on board, as a « volontaire d'honneur » (honour volunteer). Léon Pierre became, in 1797, father of the future poet Alfred de Vigny.) For her maiden voyage, Hébé was tasked to escort a convoy from Saint Malo to Brest and protect shipping from the depredations of the Royal Navy in the context of the Anglo-French War.

In the action of 4 September 1782, she was chased by the frigate HMS Rainbow, whose 32-pounder carronade chase guns shot away her wheel and mortally wounded her second captain, Yves-Gabriel Calloët de Lanidy. The weight of the ball made de Vigny (who assumed command) mistake Rainbow for a disguised ship of the line. Even though the first shots had shown that Rainbow's guns had a shorter range than Hébé's stern chasers, de Vigny failed to alter his course so that the longer range of his guns could fire a broadside and thus wasted his only chance to turn the tide of battle. The foremast of Hébé was then seriously damaged, reducing her maneuverability. An hour and a half later, when Rainbow was about to come alongside, de Vigny was left with only four working port guns and immediately struck his colours.

== British Royal Navy career ==
As was standard practice with captured warships that were not seriously damaged, the British took Hébé into service; she was recommissioned as HMS Hebe.

In December 1784 Hebe captured Rover, a lugger engaged in smuggling, off the Isle of Wight. Rover had a cargo of 2,000 casks of spirits and a small quantity of tea. She had come from Flushing and Hebe took her into Portsmouth where her goods were confiscated, and the ship and crew placed in the custody of naval authorities.

On 3 July 1795 Melampus and Hebe intercepted a French convoy of 13 vessels off St Malo. Melampus captured an armed brig and Hebe captured six merchant vessels: Maria Louisa, Abeille. Bon Foi, Patrouille, Eleonore, and Pecheur. The brig was armed with four 24-pounders and had a crew of 60 men. Later she was identified as the French warship Vésuve. The convoy had been on its way from Île-de-Bréhat to Brest. Seaflower, Daphne, and the cutter Sprightly shared in the prize and head money after helping escort the captured ships back to England. The Royal Navy took Vésuve into service as HMS Vesuve.

Because Hebe served in the navy's Egyptian campaign (8 March to 2 September 1801), her officers and crew qualified for the clasp "Egypt" to the Naval General Service Medal, which the Admiralty issued in 1847 to all surviving claimants from the campaign.

On 24 December 1805, the Navy removed all traces of the ship's French origin by changing her name to HMS Blonde.

On 15 August 1807, Blonde, under Captain Volant Vashon Ballard, completed her final major action at sea with the capture of Dame Villaret after a chase of 13 hours. She was armed with an 18-pounder gun and four 9-pounder carronades and had a crew of 69 men. According to the ship's captured logbook, she had been out twenty days but had taken no prizes.

== Fate ==
The Royal Navy paid off Blonde in July 1810 as she was considered too old for any further use. She was eventually broken up at Deptford in June 1811.
