= List of Major National Historical and Cultural Sites in Heilongjiang =

This list is of Major Sites Protected for their Historical and Cultural Value at the National Level in the Province of Heilongjiang, People's Republic of China.

== List ==
Site	Date	Location	Image	Coordinates	Designation
Shangjing Longquanfu, Capital of Balhae 渤海国上京龙泉府遗址	Balhae	Ning'an	Upload file	44°07′42″N 129°09′29″E	1-158
Shangjing Huiningfu, Capital of the Jin dynasty 金上京会宁府遗址	Jin	Acheng District	Upload file	45°30′44″N 126°58′51″E	2-54
Yagou Rock Carvings 亚沟石刻	Jin	Acheng District	Upload file	45°25′39″N 127°20′10″E	3-166
Ang'angxi site 昂昂溪遗址	Neolithic	Qiqihar	Upload file	47°08′46″N 123°50′20″E	3-196
Puyulu City ruins 蒲与路故城遗址	Jin	Kedong County	Upload file	48°04′28″N 126°23′03″E	3-219
Baijinbao site 白金宝遗址	Bronze Age	Zhaoyuan County	Upload file	45°29′09″N 124°27′20″E	4-23
1 Yiyuan Street 哈尔滨颐园街一号欧式建筑	1922	Harbin	Upload file	45°45′34″N 126°38′33″E	4-225
Saint Sophia Cathedral, Harbin 哈尔滨圣索非亚大教堂	1923-32	Harbin	Upload file	45°46′12″N 126°37′38″E	4-227
Harbin Confucian Temple 哈尔滨文庙	1926-29	Harbin	Upload file	45°46′29″N 126°40′32″E	4-228
Han and Wei Sites of the Sanjiang Plain 三江平原汉魏时期遗址	Han, Wei	Jiamusi, Shuangyashan, Youyi County, Baoqing County, Fujin City	Upload file		5-34
Aolimi City site 奥里米城址	Jin	Suibin County	Upload file		5-35
Balicheng site 八里城遗址	Jin	Zhaodong	Upload file	45°40′27″N 125°52′47″E	5-36
Aigun New City 瑷珲新城遗址	Qing	Heihe	Upload file	49°58′18″N 127°27′16″E	5-480
First Well of Daqing Oil Field 大庆第一口油井	1959	Daqing	Upload file		5-481
Wupai Mountain City 五排山城址	Warring States to Han	Dongning County	Upload file	43°56′00″N 130°47′58″E	6-62
Xiaosifang Mountain City 小四方山城址	Warring States to Han	Muling	Upload file		6-63
Yanwodao site 雁窝岛城址	Sui	Baoqing County	Upload file		6-64
Tazicheng site 塔子城址	Liao	Tailai County	Upload file	46°36′44″N 123°04′30″E	6-65
Walihuotun site 瓦里霍吞城址	Liao to Qing	Huachuan County	Upload file		6-66
Taowen Wanhufu City 桃温万户府故城	Yuan	Tangyuan County	Upload file	47°06′14″N 130°43′20″E	6-67
Mangjitazhan City 莽吉塔站故城	Ming	Fuyuan County	Upload file	46°58′14″N 130°35′10″E	6-68
Daobeishan cemetery 刀背山墓地	Neolithic	Jixi	Upload file		6-245
Mudanjiang Border Wall 牡丹江边墙	Tang to Jin	Mudanjiang	Upload file		6-503
Bukui Mosque 卜奎清真寺	Qing	Qiqihar	Upload file	47°20′46″N 123°57′22″E	6-504
Moscow Market 哈尔滨莫斯科商场旧址	Qing	Harbin	Upload file		6-922
Buildings of the Chinese Eastern Railway 中东铁路建筑群	Qing	Hailin	Upload file		6-923
Unit 731 site of the Japanese Invasion Troops 侵华日军第七三一部队旧址	1936-45	Harbin	Upload file	45°36′26″N 126°38′00″E	6-924
Dongning Forts of the Japanese Invasion Troops 侵华日军东北要塞	1934-45	Dongning County	Upload file		6-925
Xiaolaha Site 小拉哈遗址	Neolithic to Warring States	Zhaoyuan County	Upload file		7-123

As well as sites protected at the national level, there are also sites in Heilongjiang that are protected at the provincial level (see 黑龙江省文物保护单位).

== See also ==
- Principles for the Conservation of Heritage Sites in China
