= Xinghua Township, Baiquan County =

Xinghua Township 兴华乡
- Township
- Location in Heilongjiang Xinghua Township (China)
- Coordinates: 47°41′47″N 126°03′49″E
- Country: People's Republic of China
- Province: Heilongjiang
- Prefecture-level city: Qiqihar
- County: Baiquan
- Village-level divisions: 10 villages
- Elevation: 296 m (971 ft)
- Time zone: UTC+8 (China Standard)
- Area code: 0452

Xinghua Township (simplified Chinese: 兴华乡; traditional Chinese: 興華鄉; pinyin: Xīnghuá Xiāng) is a township of Baiquan County in western Heilongjiang province, China, located about 10 kilometres (6.2 mi) due north of the county seat. As of 2011, it has eight villages under its administration.

== See also ==
- List of township-level divisions of Heilongjiang
