= Xinjian Subdistrict, Qiqihar =

Xinjian Subdistrict 新建街道
- Subdistrict
- Location in Heilongjiang Xinjian Subdistrict (China)
- Coordinates: 47.1549°N 123.8054°E
- Country: People's Republic of China
- Province: Heilongjiang
- Prefecture-level city: Qiqihar
- District: Ang'angxi District
- Time zone: UTC+8 (China Standard)

Xinjian Subdistrict (Chinese: 新建街道; pinyin: Xīnjiàn Jiēdào) is a subdistrict in Ang'angxi District, Qiqihar, Heilongjiang province, China. As of 2018, it has 2 residential communities under its administration.

== See also ==
- List of township-level divisions of Heilongjiang
