= Baoquan =

Baoquan (宝泉) could refer to the following locations in China:

- Baoquan, Kedong County (宝泉镇), town in Heilongjiang
- Baoquan Township (宝泉乡), Gongzhuling, Jilin
