= Bukui Mosque =

Mosque in Qiqihar, Heilongjiang, China

- 卜奎清真寺
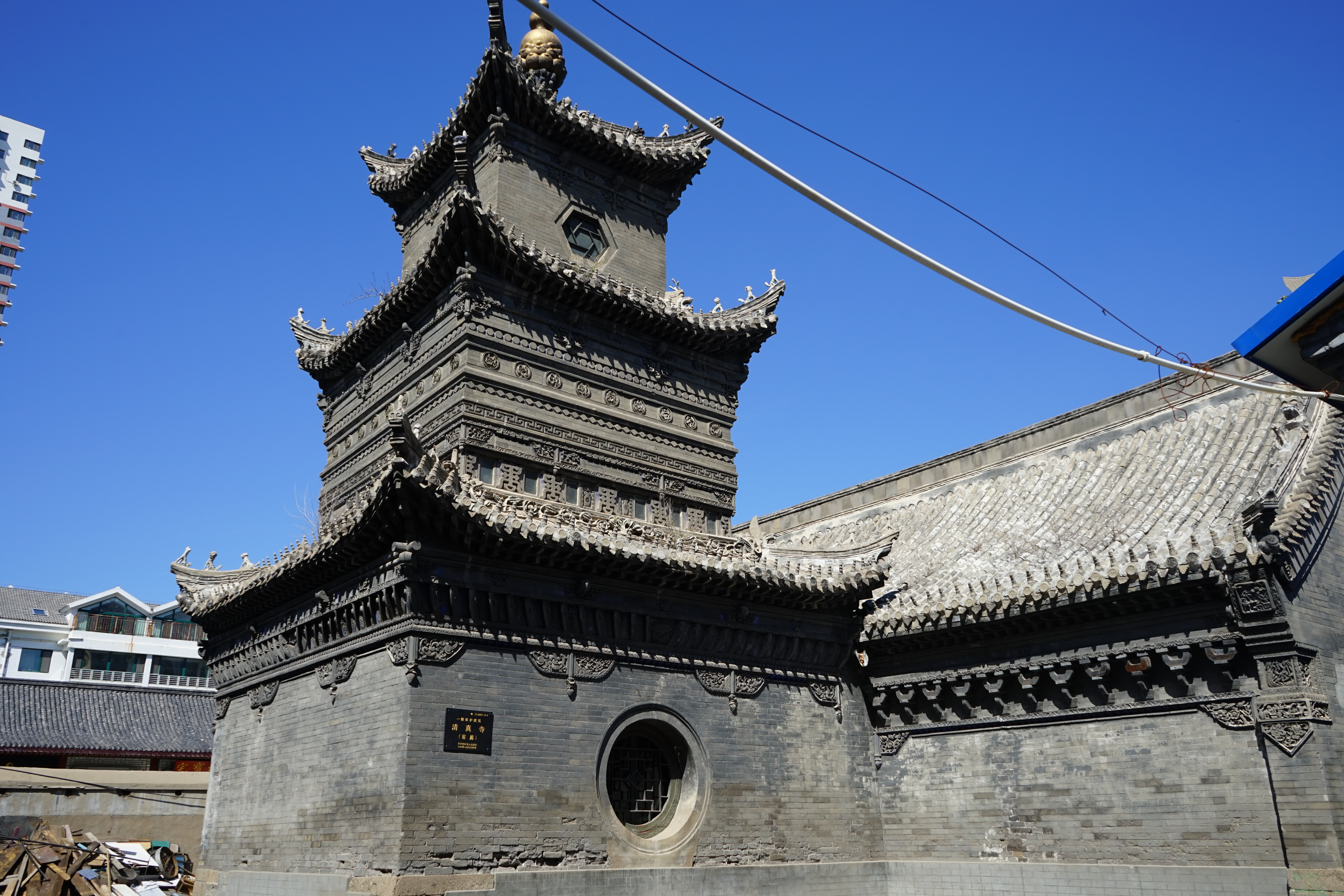

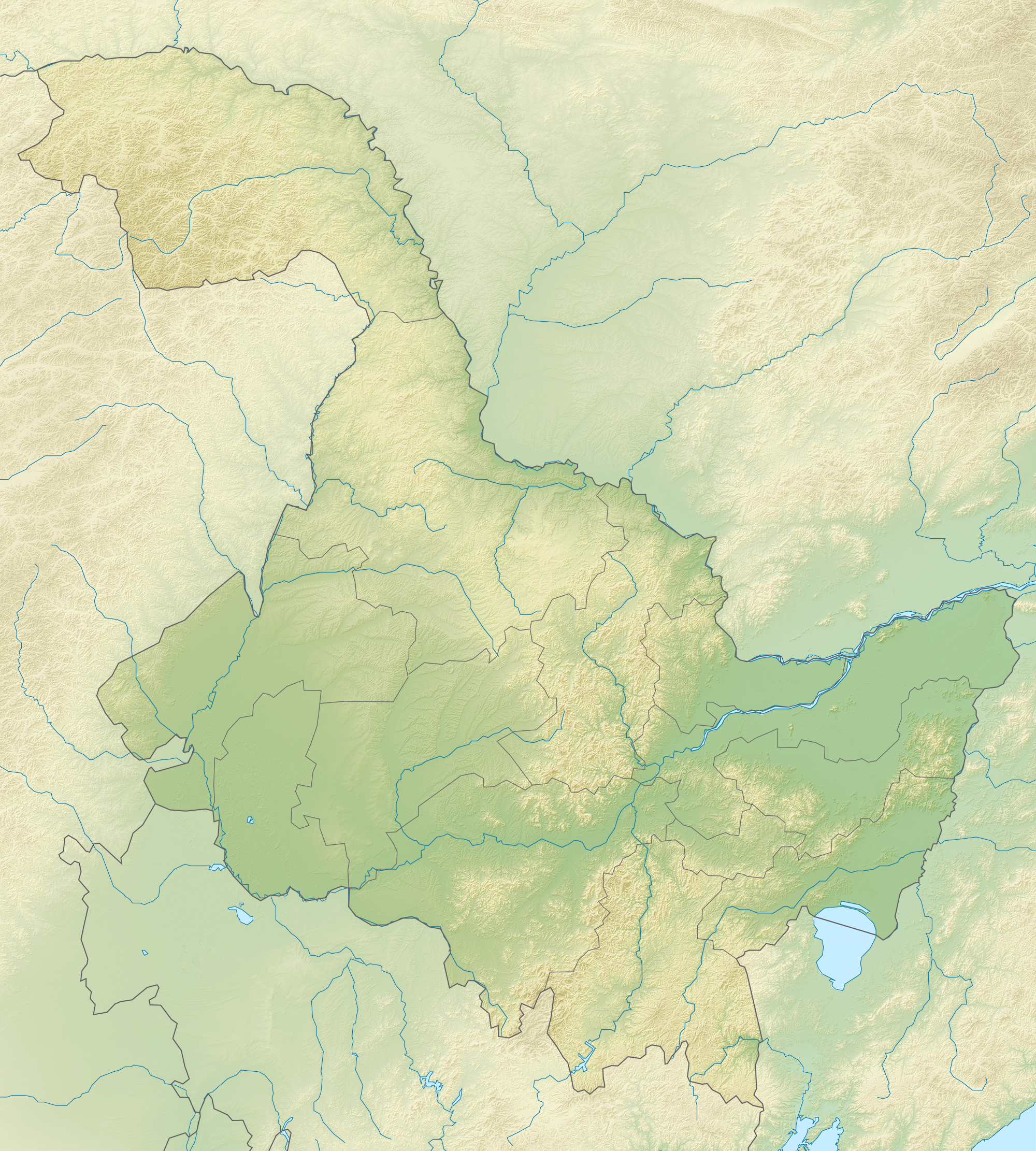
- Location of the mosque in Heilongjiang

Religion
- Affiliation: Sunni Islam
- Ecclesiastical or organizational status: Mosque
- Status: Active

Location
- Location: Qiqihar, Heilongjiang
- Country: China
- Interactive map of Bukui Mosque
- Coordinates: 47°21′3″N 123°57′3″E

Architecture
- Type: Mosque
- Completed: 1684 (East); 1852 (West)

Specifications
- Capacity: 450 worshipers
- Interior area: 2,000 m^{2} (22,000 sq ft)
- Minaret: 1 (pagoda-style)
- Site area: 6,400 m^{2} (69,000 sq ft)

Major cultural heritage sites under national-level protection
- Official name: Bukui Mosque 卜奎清真寺
- Type: Cultural
- Criteria: Religion
- Designated: 25 June 2006
- Reference no.: 6-504

The Bukui Mosque (Chinese: 卜奎清真寺; pinyin: Bǔkuí Qīngzhēnsì) is a mosque in Qiqihar, in the Heilongjiang province of China. It is located in Mosque Road (Chinese: 清真路; pinyin: Qīng Zhēn Lù) off Bukui Street. It was built during the Qing dynasty, and was listed as a Chinese major cultural heritage site in 2006. It is the largest and oldest mosque in Heilongjiang province.

== History and structure ==
The name "Bukui" is the Chinese transcription of a Daur word meaning "auspicious". Bukui Mosque originally consisted of two separate mosques:

- The East Mosque, a three-storey, 374-square-metre (4,030 sq ft) building constructed in Kangxi 23 (1684), predating the city of Qiqihar by seven years
- The West Mosque, a two-storey, 173-square-metre (1,860 sq ft) building constructed in Xianfeng 3 (1852) by followers of the Jahriyya menhuan who immigrated from Gansu

The mosque contains approximately 2,000 square metres (22,000 sq ft) of constructed space; the whole compound covers an area of approximately 6,400 square metres (69,000 sq ft). The two prayer spaces together can hold approximately 450 worshipers.

The mosque's long history has led to a saying in Qiqihar: "the mosque existed long before the town Bukui". (Note: simplified Chinese: 先有清真寺，后有卜奎城; traditional Chinese: 先有清真寺，後有卜奎城; pinyin: Xiān yǒu qīngzhēnsì, hòu yǒu Bǔkuíchéng.) In 1958, the two mosques were reorganised as a single mosque, with the name "Qiqihar Mosque". The mosque was listed as a city-level protected cultural relic in 1980, and as a provincial-level protected cultural relic in 1981; its name was then also changed to the present "Bukui Mosque".

An assessment completed in 1981 found that while the East Mosque was in relatively good condition, there was serious structural damage to the West Mosque. Reconstruction efforts were undertaken in 1989–1990. On 25 June 2006, the Bukui Mosque was entered onto the list of Chinese major cultural heritage sites of national significance.

== See also ==
Bukui Mosque
- Simplified Chinese: 卜奎清真寺
Transcriptions
Standard Mandarin
- Hanyu Pinyin: Bǔkuí Qīngzhēnsì

- Islam in China
- List of mosques in China
- List of Major National Historical and Cultural Sites in Heilongjiang
