= Fularji District =

Fularji 富拉尔基区
- District
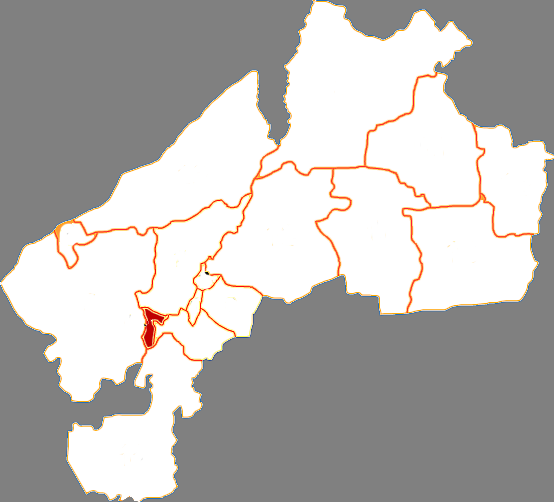
- Location of Fularji within Qiqihar City

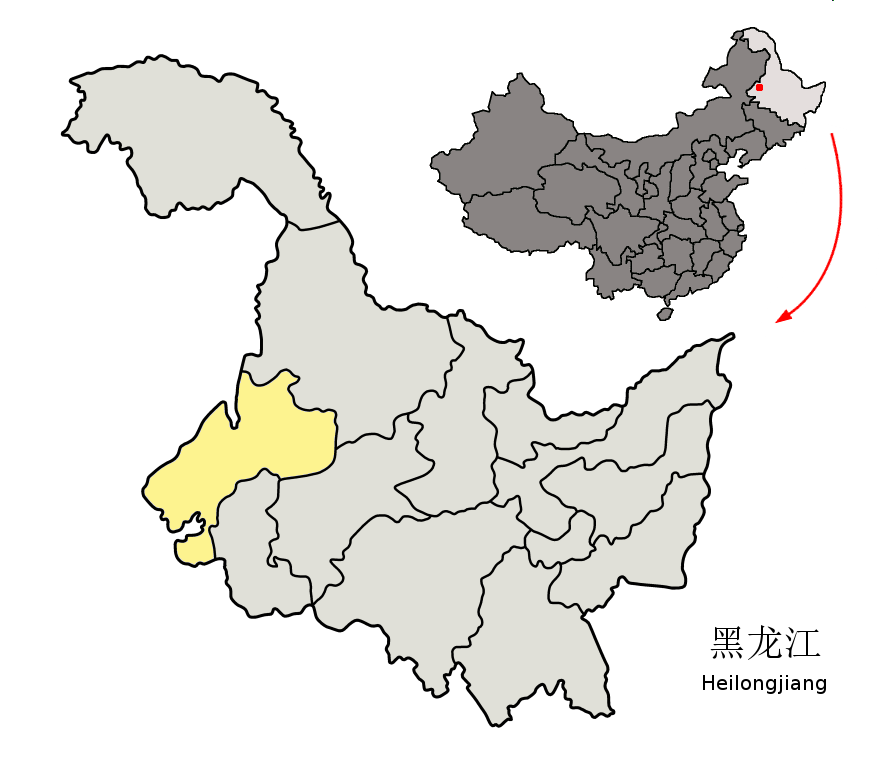
- Location of Qiqihar City in Heilongjiang
- Coordinates: 47°12′32″N 123°37′44″E
- Country: People's Republic of China
- Province: Heilongjiang
- Prefecture-level city: Qiqihar

Area
  - Total: 375 km^{2} (145 sq mi)

Population (2003)
  - Total: 270,000
  - Density: 720/km^{2} (1,900/sq mi)
- Time zone: UTC+8 (China Standard)

Fularji (simplified Chinese: 富拉尔基区; traditional Chinese: 富拉爾基區; pinyin: Fùlā'ěrjī Qū) is a district of the province of Heilongjiang, People's Republic of China. It is under the jurisdiction of the prefecture-level city of Qiqihar.

== Administrative divisions ==
Fularji District is divided into 8 subdistricts, 1 township and 1 ethnic township.

8 subdistricts

- Hong'an (红岸街道), Yanjiang (沿江街道), Dianli (电力街道), Xingfu (幸福街道), Hongbaoshi (红宝石街道), Beixing (北兴街道), Tiebei (铁北街道), Heping (和平街道)

1 township

- Changqing (长青乡)

1 ethnic township

- Duermenqin Daur (杜尔门沁达斡尔族乡)
