= Ang'angxi District =

Ang'angxi 昂昂溪区
- District
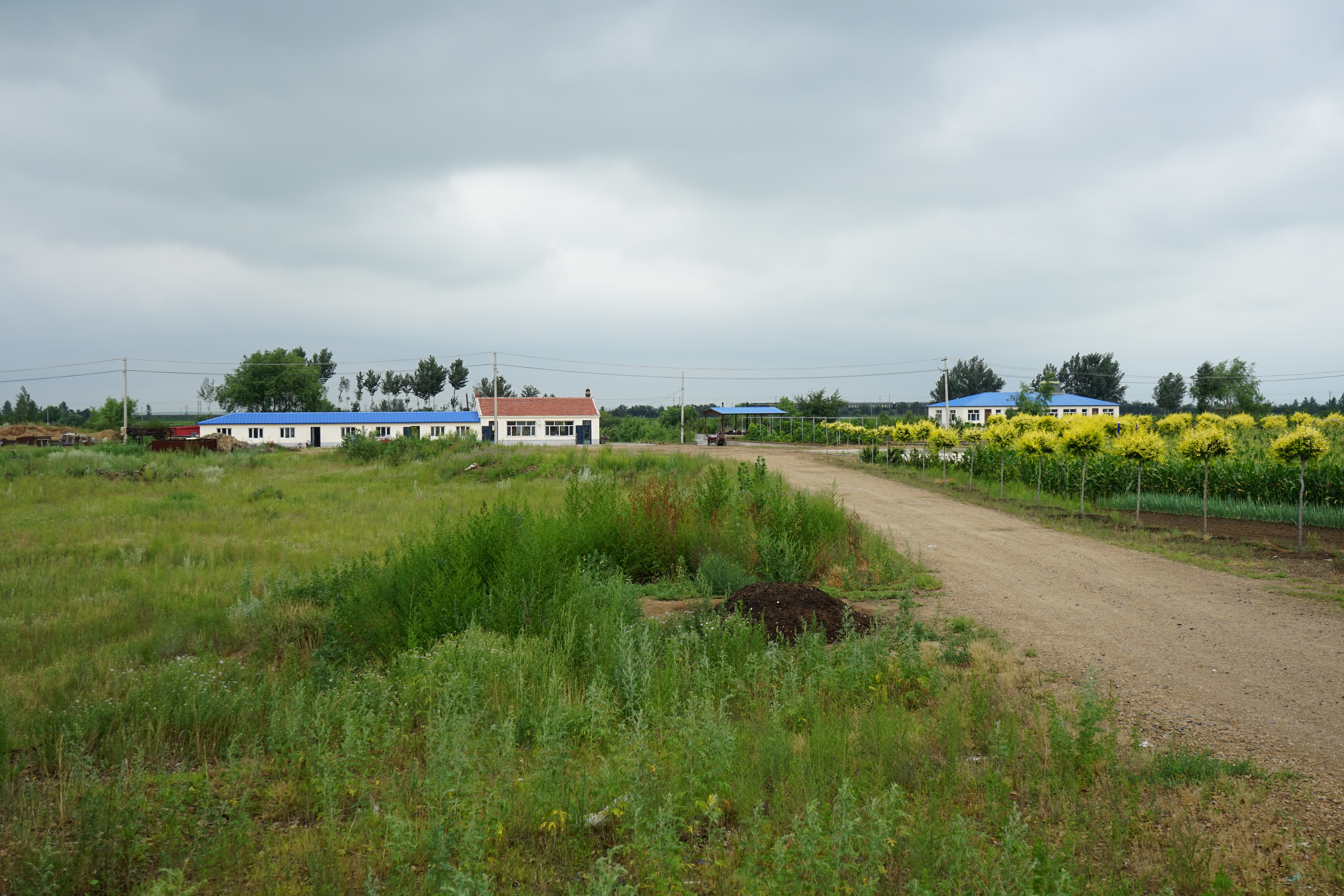
- Ang'angxi rural area

- Location in Heilongjiang
- Coordinates: 47°09′14″N 123°48′17″E
- Country: People's Republic of China
- Province: Heilongjiang
- Prefecture-level city: Qiqihar
- Township-level divisions: 4 subdistricts 1 town 1 ethnic town
- District seat: Xinxing Subdistrict (新兴街道)

Area
  - Total: 623 km^{2} (241 sq mi)
- Elevation: 145 m (476 ft)

Population
  - Total: 90,000
  - Density: 140/km^{2} (370/sq mi)
- Time zone: UTC+8 (China Standard)
- Postal code: 161031
- Area code: 0452

Ang'angxi (Chinese: 昂昂溪; pinyin: Áng'ángxī) is a county-level district of the city of Qiqihar in Heilongjiang province, China. It has an area of 623 km^{2} (241 sq mi) and a population of approximately 90,000.

== Administrative divisions ==
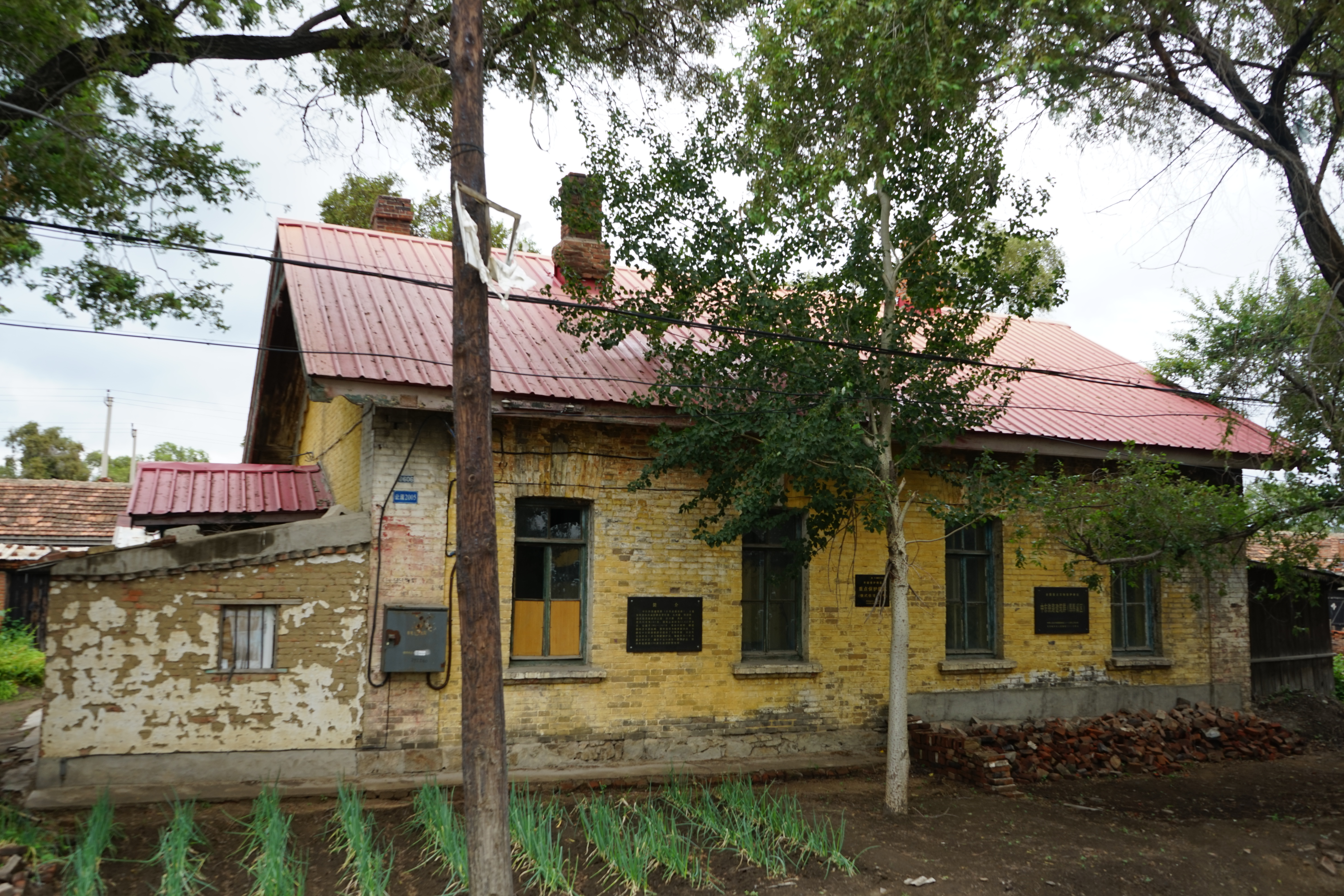
Russian-style house

There are four subdistricts, one town, and one ethnic town in the district:

Subdistricts:

- Xinxing Subdistrict (新兴街道), Xinjian Subdistrict (新建街道), Daobei Subdistrict (道北街道), Linji Subdistrict (林机街道)

Towns:

- Yushutun (榆树屯镇), Shuishiying Manchu Ethnic Town (水师营满族镇)
