= Jianhua District =

Jianhua District 建华区
- District
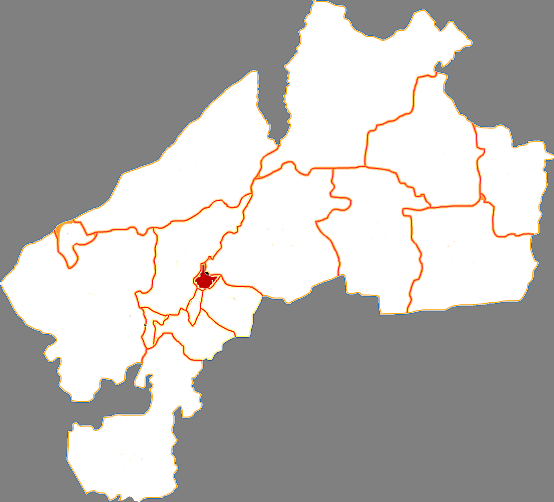
- Location of Jianhua District in Qiqihar

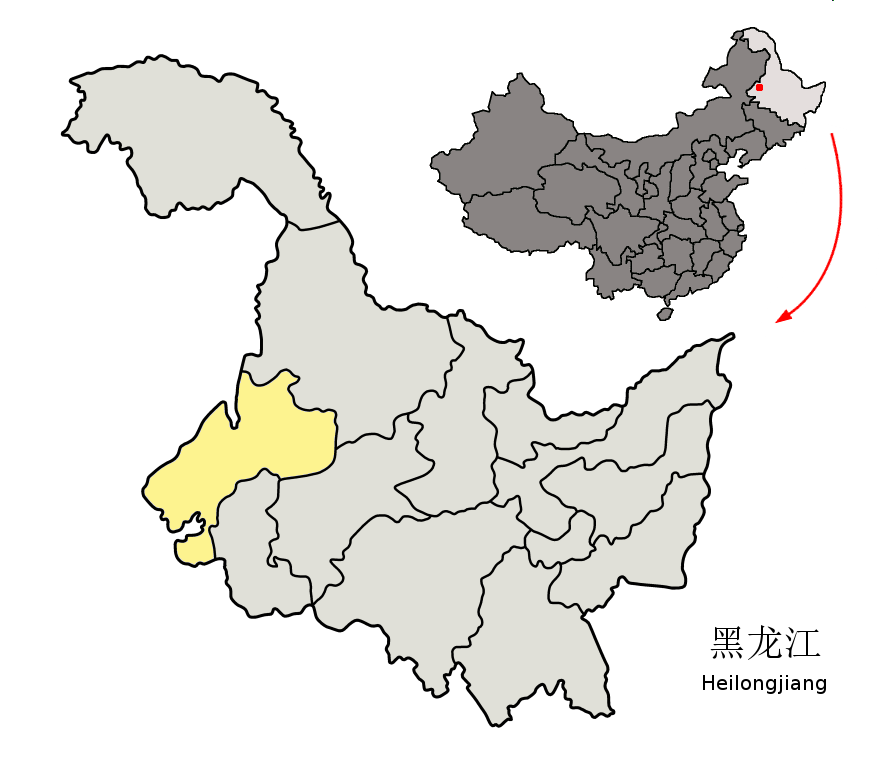
- Qiqihar in Heilongjiang
- Coordinates (Qiqihar government): 47°21′29″N 123°55′12″E
- Country: People's Republic of China
- Province: Heilongjiang
- Prefecture-level city: Qiqihar

Area
  - Total: 81 km^{2} (31 sq mi)

Population (2010)
  - Total: 292,579
  - Density: 3,600/km^{2} (9,400/sq mi)
- Time zone: UTC+8 (China Standard)
- Website: www.jhq.gov.cn

Jianhua District (simplified Chinese: 建华区; traditional Chinese: 建華區; pinyin: Jiànhuá Qū) is a district and the seat of the city of Qiqihar, Heilongjiang province, People's Republic of China. The name of the district comes from "Jianhua" factory.

The area of the district is 81 km^{2} (31 sq mi), and holds a population of 220,000.

== Administrative divisions ==
Jianhua District is divided into 5 subdistricts.

5 subdistricts

- Zhonghua (中华街道), Xidaqiao (西大桥街道), Bokui (卜奎街道), Jianshe (建设街道), Wenhua (文化街道)
