= Baoquan, Heilongjiang =

Baoquan 宝泉镇
- Town
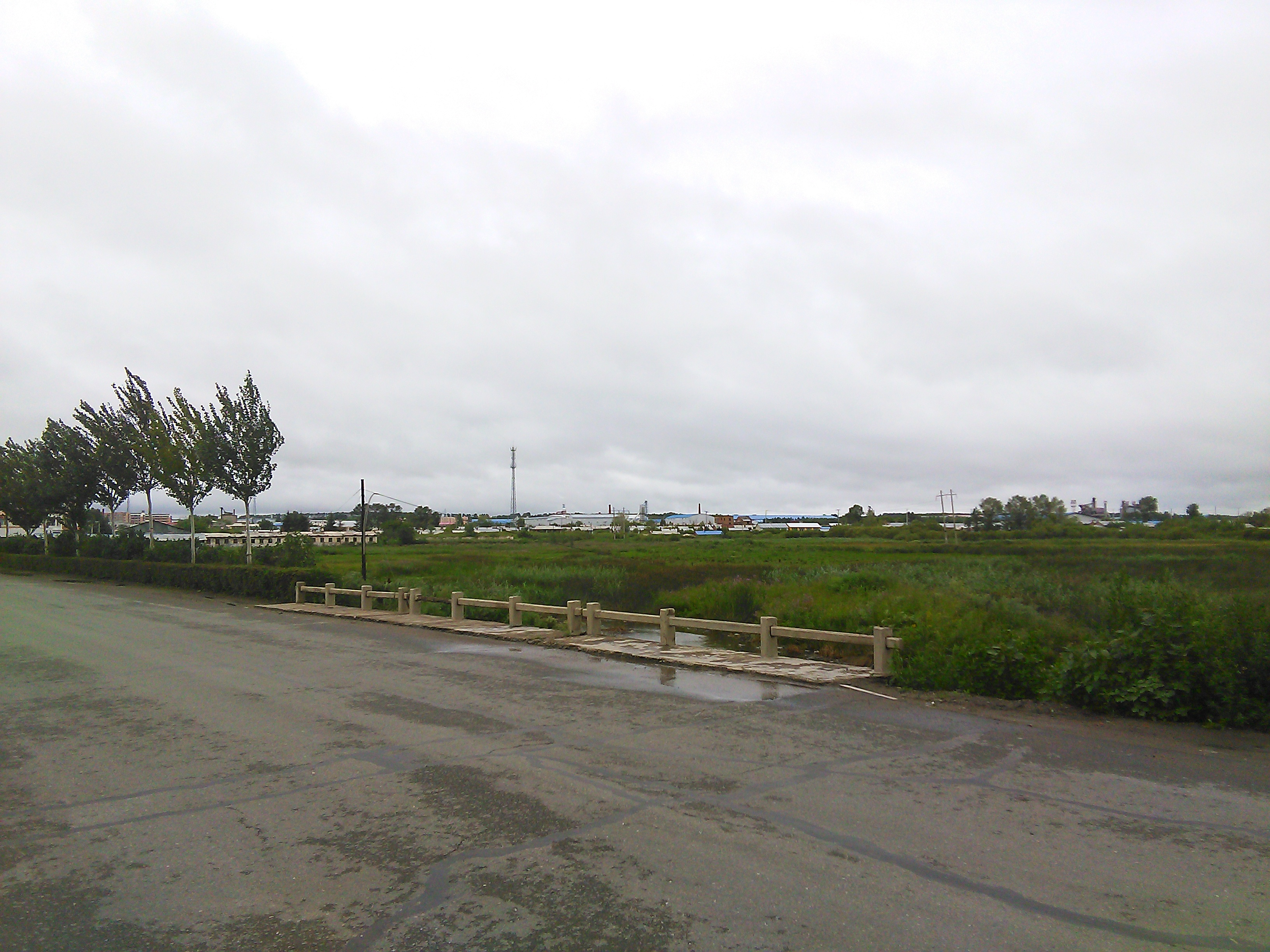

- Location within Heilongjiang Location within China
- Coordinates: 48°09′38″N 126°12′51″E
- Country: China
- Province: Heilongjiang
- Prefecture-level city: Qiqihar
- County: Kedong County
- Elevation: 236 m (774 ft)
- Time zone: UTC+8 (China Standard)
- Postal code: 230230101

Baoquan (simplified Chinese: 宝泉; traditional Chinese: 寶泉; pinyin: Bǎoquán; lit. 'precious springs') is a town in Kedong County, western Heilongjiang province, Northeast China, located on a tributary of the Nonni River more than 190 kilometres (120 mi) east-northeast of the city of Qiqihar. China National Highway 202 (G202) passes through the town, which is down the road from the city of Bei'an and the county seat, which lies some 13 km (8.1 mi) to the south.
