= Baiquan County =

Baiquan County 拜泉县
- County
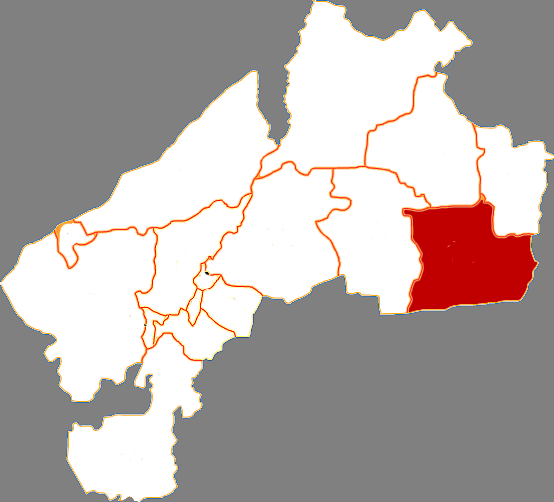

- Location in Heilongjiang
- Coordinates: 47°35′N 126°01′E
- Country: People's Republic of China
- Province: Heilongjiang
- Prefecture-level city: Qiqihar
- Township-level divisions: 7 towns 9 townships
- County seat: Baiquan Town (拜泉镇)

Area
  - Total: 3,569 km^{2} (1,378 sq mi)
- Elevation: 233 m (764 ft)

Population
  - Total: 570,000
  - Density: 160/km^{2} (410/sq mi)
- Time zone: UTC+8 (China Standard)
- Postal code: 164700
- Area code: 0452

Baiquan (Chinese: 拜泉; pinyin: Bàiquán) is a county of western Heilongjiang province, People's Republic of China. It is under the jurisdiction of the prefecture-level city of Qiqihar.

== Administrative divisions ==
There are seven towns and nine townships in the county:

=== Towns (镇) ===
- Baiquan (拜泉镇)
- Sandao (三道镇)
- Xingnong (兴农镇)
- Zhangchun (长春镇)
- Longquan (龙泉镇)
- Guofu (国富镇)
- Fuqiang (富强镇)

=== Townships (乡) ===
- Xinsheng Township (新生乡)
- Xingguo Township (兴国乡)
- Shangsheng Township (上升乡)
- Xinghua Township (兴华乡)
- Dazhong Township (大众乡)
- Fengchan Township (丰产乡)
- Yongqin Township (永勤乡)
- Shizhong Township (时中乡)
- Ainong Township (爱农乡)

== Demographics ==
The population of the district was 566,959 in 1999.

== Climate ==
Climate data for Baiquan, elevation 250 m (820 ft), (1991–2020 normals, extremes 1981–present)
Month	Jan	Feb	Mar	Apr	May	Jun	Jul	Aug	Sep	Oct	Nov	Dec	Year
Record high °C (°F)	−1.2 (29.8)	7.6 (45.7)	19.9 (67.8)	28.6 (83.5)	33.9 (93.0)	38.4 (101.1)	36.5 (97.7)	34.8 (94.6)	32.7 (90.9)	26.2 (79.2)	13.3 (55.9)	4.6 (40.3)	38.4 (101.1)
Mean daily maximum °C (°F)	−15.1 (4.8)	−9.2 (15.4)	0.6 (33.1)	11.9 (53.4)	20.3 (68.5)	25.5 (77.9)	27.2 (81.0)	25.3 (77.5)	19.9 (67.8)	10.4 (50.7)	−2.9 (26.8)	−13.3 (8.1)	8.4 (47.1)
Daily mean °C (°F)	−21.1 (−6.0)	−16.1 (3.0)	−5.5 (22.1)	5.7 (42.3)	14.1 (57.4)	20.0 (68.0)	22.4 (72.3)	20.2 (68.4)	13.8 (56.8)	4.4 (39.9)	−8.3 (17.1)	−18.7 (−1.7)	2.6 (36.6)
Mean daily minimum °C (°F)	−26 (−15)	−22.1 (−7.8)	−11.6 (11.1)	−0.5 (31.1)	7.4 (45.3)	14.2 (57.6)	17.8 (64.0)	15.4 (59.7)	8.0 (46.4)	−0.9 (30.4)	−12.9 (8.8)	−23.2 (−9.8)	−2.9 (26.8)
Record low °C (°F)	−39.4 (−38.9)	−38.8 (−37.8)	−29.4 (−20.9)	−12.4 (9.7)	−6.8 (19.8)	3.0 (37.4)	7.7 (45.9)	3.8 (38.8)	−6.8 (19.8)	−18.5 (−1.3)	−30.9 (−23.6)	−38.6 (−37.5)	−39.4 (−38.9)
Average precipitation mm (inches)	2.7 (0.11)	2.9 (0.11)	7.2 (0.28)	21.2 (0.83)	40.8 (1.61)	91.0 (3.58)	159.5 (6.28)	121.3 (4.78)	57.8 (2.28)	20.1 (0.79)	7.3 (0.29)	5.1 (0.20)	536.9 (21.14)
Average precipitation days (≥ 0.1 mm)	4.2	3.0	4.3	6.6	10.5	13.7	13.9	13.7	9.4	6.1	4.8	6.2	96.4
Average snowy days	7.5	5.4	6.6	3.4	0.3	0	0	0	0.1	2.5	7.7	8.9	42.4
Average relative humidity (%)	72	68	57	51	51	65	77	80	70	62	66	73	66
Mean monthly sunshine hours	156.1	190.5	239.1	225.8	243.3	239.2	237.2	233.0	221.8	193.5	162.1	138.1	2,479.7
Percentage possible sunshine	56	65	64	55	52	50	50	53	60	58	59	53	56
Source: China Meteorological Administration All-time Oct extreme

== Transport ==
- China National Highway 202
