= Kedong County =

Kedong County 克东县
- County
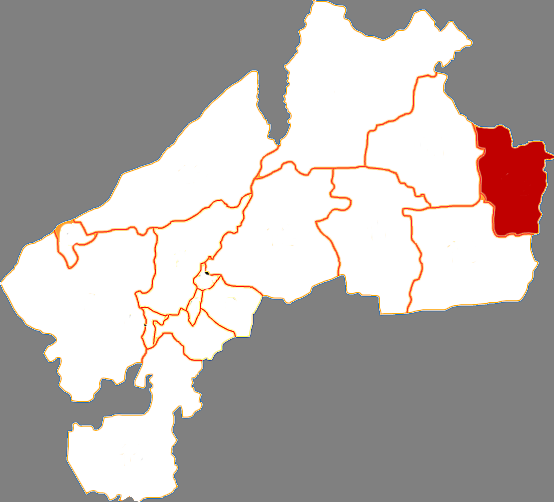
- Location in Qiqihar

- Location of the seat in Heilongjiang
- Coordinates: 48°02′31″N 126°14′56″E
- Country: People's Republic of China
- Province: Heilongjiang
- Prefecture-level city: Qiqihar

Area
  - Total: 2,083 km^{2} (804 sq mi)

Population (2010)
  - Total: 264,285
  - Density: 126.9/km^{2} (328.6/sq mi)
- Time zone: UTC+8 (China Standard)
- Website: www.kedong.gov.cn

Kedong County ( simplified Chinese: 克东县; traditional Chinese: 克東縣; pinyin: Kèdōng Xiàn ) is a county under the jurisdiction of Qiqihar City in west-central Heilongjiang province, the People's Republic of China. It has an area of 2,083 km^{2} (804 sq mi) and a population of about 280,000.

== Administrative divisions ==
Kedong County include five towns and two townships.

Towns

- Kedong (玉岗镇), Yugang (盐井镇), Baoquan (宝泉镇), Qianfeng (乾丰镇), Puyulu (盐井镇)

Townships

- Runjin (润津乡), Changsheng (昌盛乡)

== Climate ==
Climate data for Kedong, elevation 297 m (974 ft), (1991–2020 normals, extremes 1981–present)
Month	Jan	Feb	Mar	Apr	May	Jun	Jul	Aug	Sep	Oct	Nov	Dec	Year
Record high °C (°F)	−4.0 (24.8)	3.4 (38.1)	19.4 (66.9)	27.6 (81.7)	33.8 (92.8)	38.4 (101.1)	36.9 (98.4)	34.7 (94.5)	33.8 (92.8)	26.2 (79.2)	12.7 (54.9)	3.7 (38.7)	38.4 (101.1)
Mean daily maximum °C (°F)	−15.9 (3.4)	−10.5 (13.1)	−0.6 (30.9)	11.1 (52.0)	19.7 (67.5)	25.2 (77.4)	26.7 (80.1)	24.8 (76.6)	19.4 (66.9)	9.6 (49.3)	−4.0 (24.8)	−14.6 (5.7)	7.6 (45.6)
Daily mean °C (°F)	−20.3 (−4.5)	−15.7 (3.7)	−5.8 (21.6)	5.4 (41.7)	13.8 (56.8)	19.7 (67.5)	21.9 (71.4)	19.9 (67.8)	13.9 (57.0)	4.4 (39.9)	−8.5 (16.7)	−18.7 (−1.7)	2.5 (36.5)
Mean daily minimum °C (°F)	−24.2 (−11.6)	−20.5 (−4.9)	−10.9 (12.4)	0.0 (32.0)	7.9 (46.2)	14.4 (57.9)	17.6 (63.7)	15.5 (59.9)	8.7 (47.7)	−0.4 (31.3)	−12.4 (9.7)	−22.3 (−8.1)	−2.2 (28.0)
Record low °C (°F)	−37.1 (−34.8)	−36.4 (−33.5)	−26.6 (−15.9)	−12.5 (9.5)	−5.6 (21.9)	1.3 (34.3)	7.5 (45.5)	−0.3 (31.5)	−5.0 (23.0)	−19.0 (−2.2)	−28.4 (−19.1)	−36.7 (−34.1)	−37.1 (−34.8)
Average precipitation mm (inches)	2.8 (0.11)	3.6 (0.14)	9.2 (0.36)	22.5 (0.89)	43.3 (1.70)	95.6 (3.76)	149.6 (5.89)	114.2 (4.50)	72.3 (2.85)	21.0 (0.83)	9.0 (0.35)	5.9 (0.23)	549 (21.61)
Average precipitation days (≥ 0.1 mm)	4.0	3.3	4.0	6.7	10.2	13.2	14.0	14.1	10.0	5.7	5.4	6.0	96.6
Average snowy days	7.5	6.0	6.9	4.3	0.4	0	0	0	0.1	2.9	8.3	8.5	44.9
Average relative humidity (%)	72	67	57	49	50	64	76	77	66	58	65	72	64
Mean monthly sunshine hours	178.6	208.4	255.6	242.3	259.3	247.4	237.2	235.8	232.0	205.3	173.1	156.9	2,631.9
Percentage possible sunshine	65	72	69	59	55	52	49	54	62	62	63	61	60
Source: China Meteorological Administration All-time Oct extreme

== See also ==
- List of administrative divisions of Heilongjiang
