= Qiqihar =

City in Manchuria, China

Qiqihar 齐齐哈尔市 Ch'i-ch'i-ha-erh, Tsitsihar
- Prefecture-level city
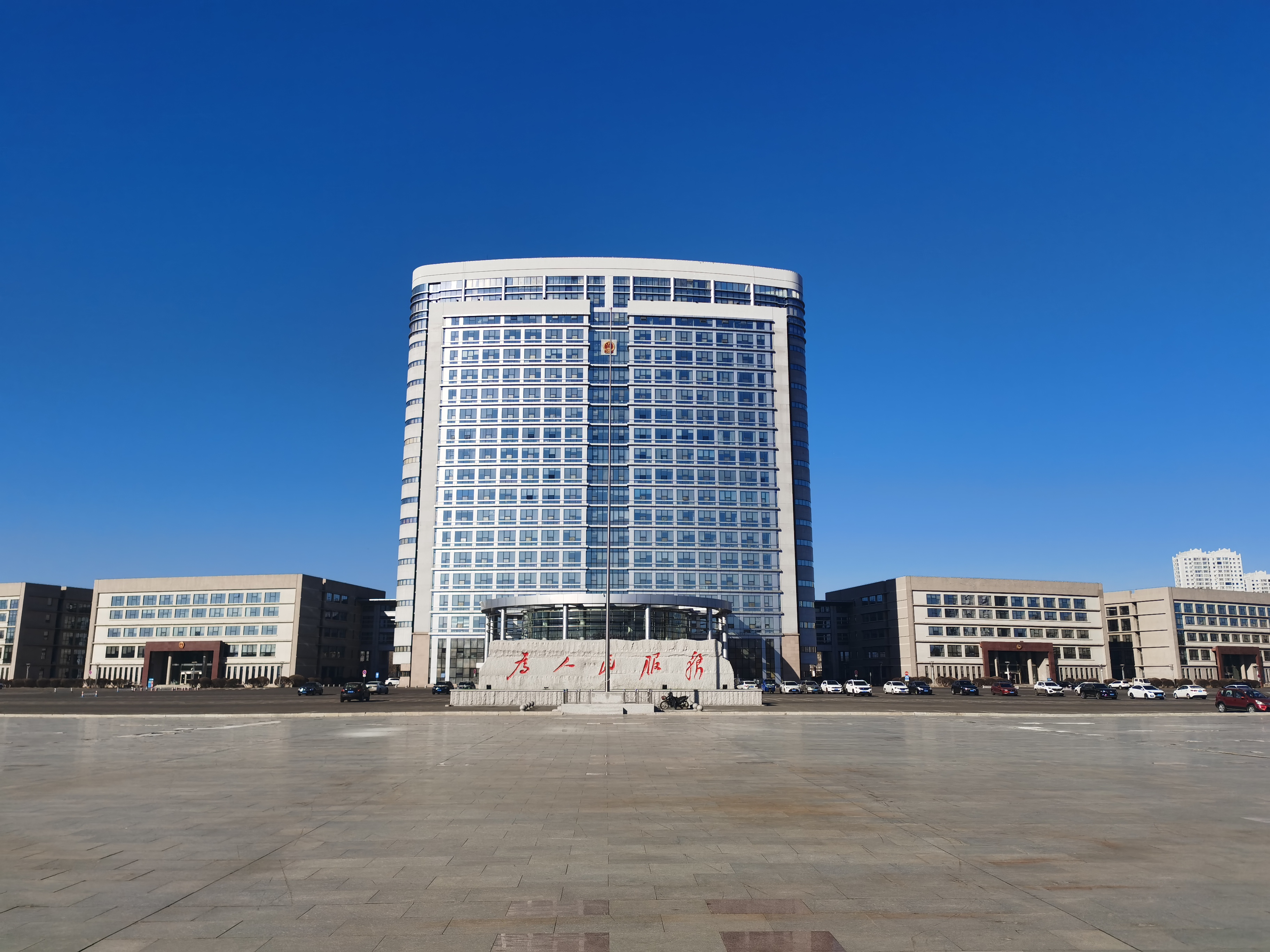
- Municipal building of Qiqihar
- Nickname: The Crane City (鹤城)
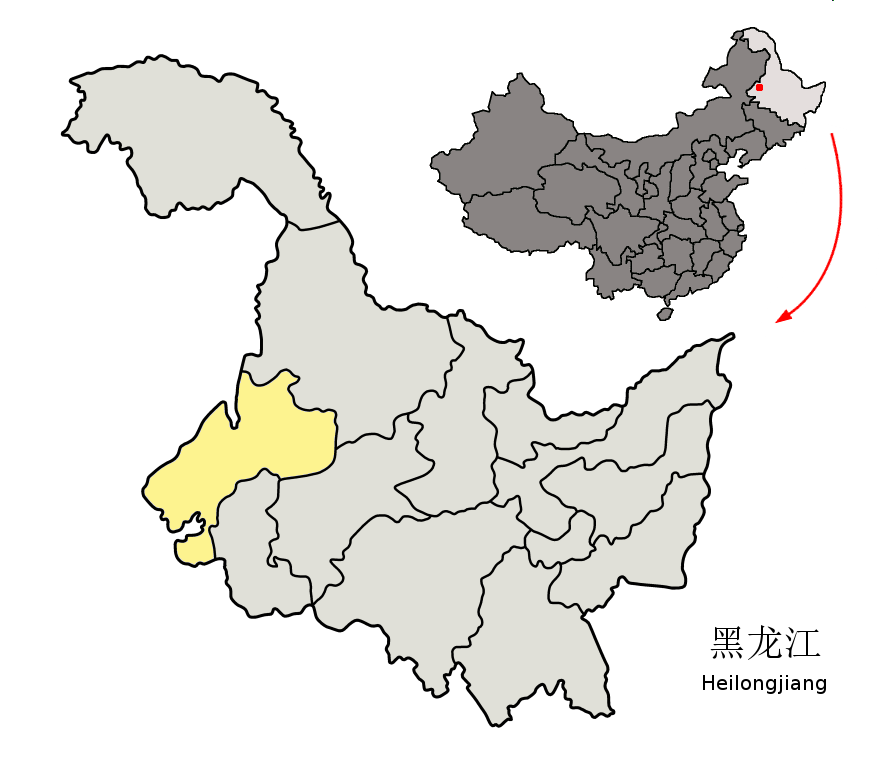
- Location of Qiqihar City (yellow) in Heilongjiang (light grey) and China

- Location of the city centre in Heilongjiang
- Coordinates (Qiqihar municipal government): 47°21′18″N 123°55′06″E
- Country: China
- Province: Heilongjiang
- County-level divisions: 16
- towns and townships: 156
- villages: 1361
- Established: 1125
- Municipal seat: Jianhua District

Government
  - Type: Prefecture-level city
  - CPC Qiqihar Secretary: Sun Shen (孙珅)
  - Mayor: Li Yugang (李玉刚)

Area
  - Prefecture-level city: 42,205.82 km^{2} (16,295.76 sq mi)
  - Urban: 4,039.3 km^{2} (1,559.6 sq mi)
  - Metro: 970.3 km^{2} (374.6 sq mi)
- Elevation: 147 m (482 ft)

Population (2020 census)
  - Prefecture-level city: 4,067,489
  - Density: 96.37270/km^{2} (249.6042/sq mi)
  - Urban: 1,406,987
  - Urban density: 348.32/km^{2} (902.16/sq mi)
  - Metro: 959,787
  - Metro density: 989.2/km^{2} (2,562/sq mi)

GDP
  - Prefecture-level city: CN¥ 127 billion US$ 20.4 billion
  - Per capita: CN¥ 23,041; US$ 3,699
- Time zone: UTC+08:00 (China Standard)
- Postal code: 161000
- Area code: 0452
- ISO 3166 code: CN-HL-02
- License Plate: 黑B
- Administrative division code: 230200
- Climate: Dwa

Qiqihar

Chinese name
- Simplified Chinese: 齐齐哈尔
- Traditional Chinese: 齊齊哈爾
- Postal: Tsitsihar
Transcriptions
Standard Mandarin
- Hanyu Pinyin: Qíqíhā'ěr
- Wade–Giles: Ch'i^{2}-ch'i^{2}-ha^{1}-erh^{3}

Manchu name
- Manchu script: ᠴᡳᠴᡳᡤᠠᡵ
- Romanization: Cicigar

Qiqihar (Note: simplified Chinese: 齐齐哈尔; traditional Chinese: 齊齊哈爾; pinyin: Qíqíhā'ěr; IPA: [tɕʰǐtɕʰǐxáɤɻ]; Manchu: ᠴᡳᠴᡳᡥᠠᡵ, Möllendorff: Cicihar, Abkai: Qiqihar, IPA: [t͡ɕʰit͡ɕʰiχar]) (also spelled Tsitsihar) is the second-largest city in the Heilongjiang province of China, in the west central part of the province. The built-up (or metro) area made up of Longsha, Tiefeng and Jianhua districts had 959,787 inhabitants, while the total population of the prefecture-level city was shrinking to 4,067,489 as of the 2020 census (5,367,003 as of 2010). In 2024, the total registered population of the city will be 5.06 million. Among them, the rural population is 3.165 million. These are mainly Han Chinese, though the city is also home to thirty-four minorities including Manchus, Daur, and Mongols. Numerous wetlands are close to Qiqihar, including the Zhalong Nature Reserve, famous in China for being home to numerous red-crowned cranes.

== Etymology ==
"Qiqihar" is a Dagur word meaning "border" or "natural pasture". The name Qiqihar comes from Manchu: ᠴᡳᠴᡳᡥᠠᡵ, Möllendorff: Cicihar, Abkai: Qiqihar, IPA: /t͡ɕʰi.t͡ɕʰi.χar/.

== History ==
=== Early history ===
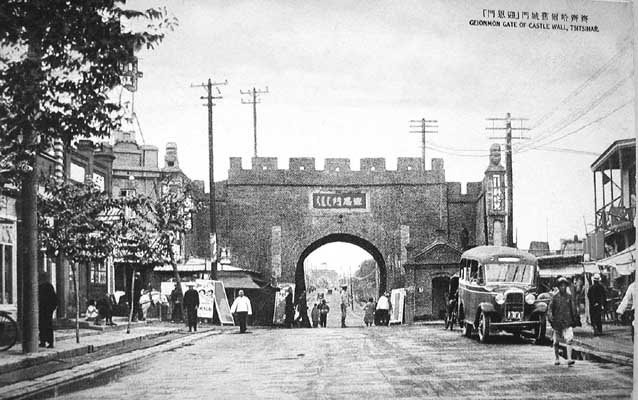
Gate of castle wall, Tsitsihar

The region was originally settled by nomadic Daur and Tungus herdsmen. The city's original name was Bukui (卜奎), the Chinese transcription of a Dagur word meaning "auspicious". The city's oldest mosque, the Bukui Mosque, predates the foundation of the city by seven years. During the Imperial Russian eastward advance to the Pacific, Qiqihar became a major garrison center in 1674. In 1691, a stronghold was constructed in Qiqihar because the Qing government campaigned against the Mongols.

Around 1700 it was a centre for Russo-Chinese trade. A military depot with barracks and an arsenal was set up there, and many convicted criminals were exiled to the area. Heilongjiang Martial was domiciled in Qiqihar City in 1699. Qing China had initially intended to keep the far-northern Heilongjiang province as a semi-pastoral area, separate from the wider Chinese agricultural economy, so it did not allow seasonal urban migrants, such as those from Hebei and Shandong who wished to participate in the Qiqihar fur trade, to own farms or develop the land.

After the Russian Empire seized Outer Manchuria according to the Treaty of Aigun and the Convention of Peking, the Qing decided to lift the various restrictions on settlement that it placed on Northeast China and on Heilongjiang residency in particular, in 1868, 1878, and 1904. It enlisted Han Chinese to help to teach the local Solon people farming techniques, provide materials and tax exemptions to convert them from hunting. In 1903, the completion of the Chinese Eastern Railway made Qiqihar a centre for communications between China and Russia. A network of lines radiating from Qiqihar was extended into the northwestern part of Heilongjiang Province including Jiagedaqi and Manzhouli in the late 1920s.

=== Second Sino-Japanese War ===
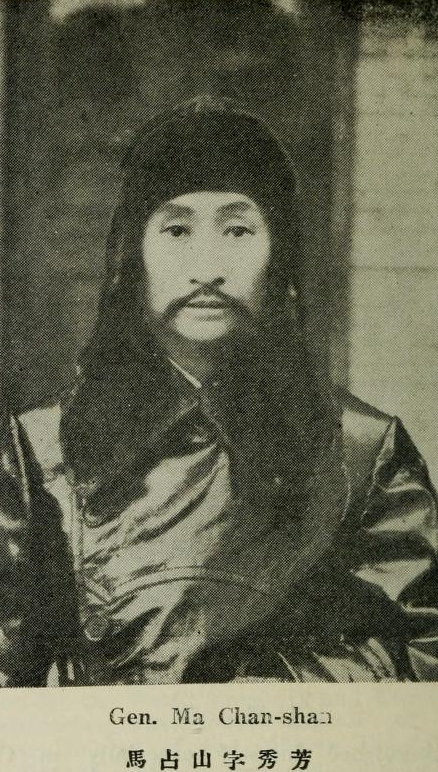
General Ma Zhanshan

In 1931, Japan used a false flag attack, known as the September 18 Incident, to justify moving its Guandong Army to capture major cities in Northeast China that month, starting with Shenyang, Changchun, then Jilin City. General Ma Zhanshan was ordered to act as Governor and Military Commander-in-chief of Heilongjiang Province on 10 October. General Ma declined a Japanese ultimatum to surrender Qiqihar on 15 November. However, after their success in the Jiangqiao campaign, the Japanese began their occupation of Qiqihar on 19 November. Liaoning fell in December, and Harbin in February; the puppet Manchukuo government of the Japanese-occupied territory under General Zhang Jinghui established Qiqihar as its administrative center and of Longjiang province. Qiqihar became a major military base for the Guandong Army and its economic importance also grew rapidly. During the occupation, the Imperial Japanese Army established Unit 516 in Qiqihar for research into chemical warfare. A major mustard gas tank left over from the Second Sino-Japanese War buried underground was accidentally damaged in August 2003, causing 43 injuries and one death.

=== Modern era ===
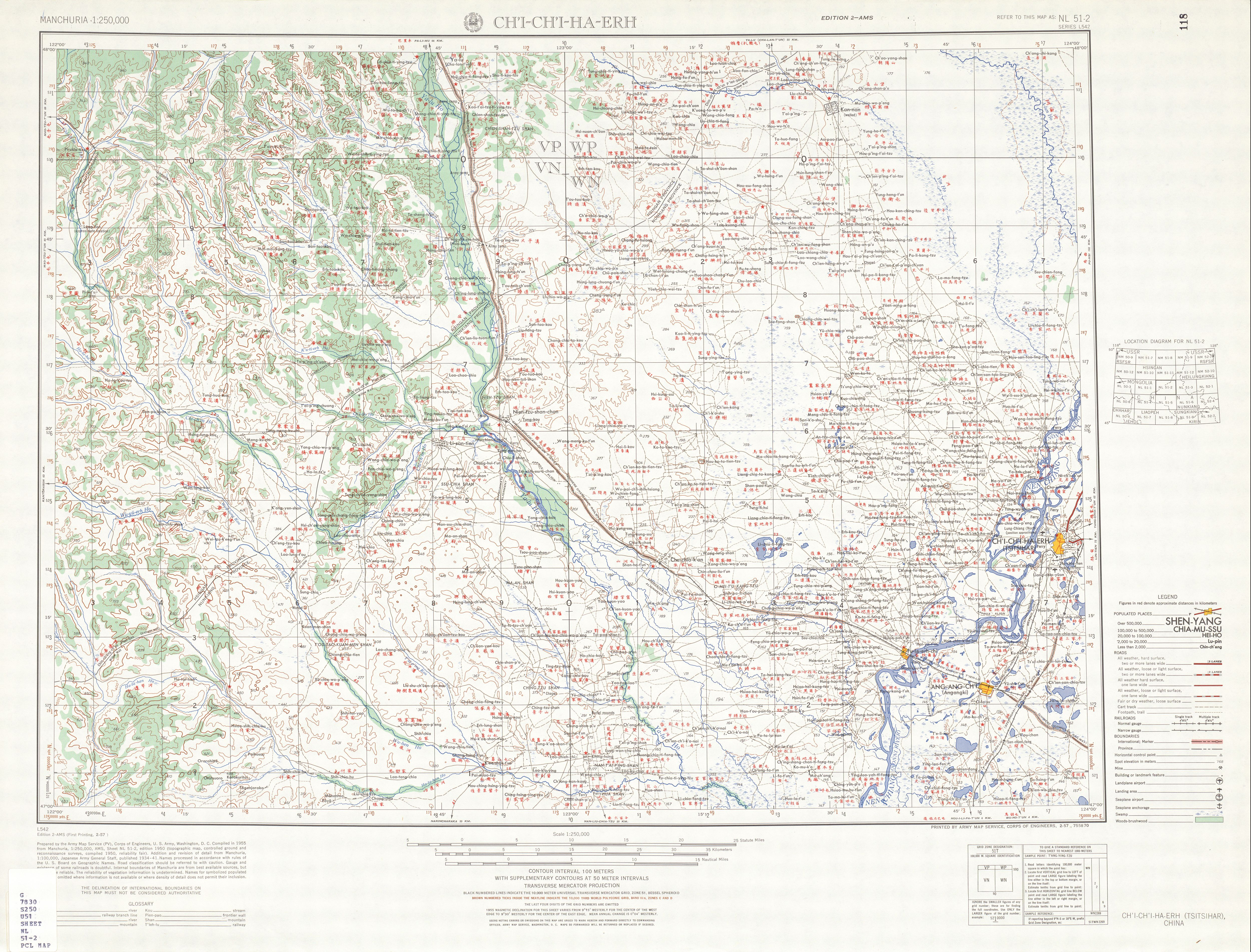
Map including Qiqihar (labelled as CH'I-CH'I-HA-ERH (TSITSIHAR) 齊齊哈爾) (AMS, 1955)

After the defeat of Japan, the Democratic Regime Qiqihar Municipal Government was established, under the administration of Nenjiang Province. Japanese forces in Northeast China surrendered to the Soviet Union while other Japanese forces in the rest of China surrendered to the Nationalist government. From March to May, Soviet troops progressively withdrew from their positions, giving the People's Liberation Army more notice than the National Revolutionary Army so that the former could occupy more positions in the context of the Chinese Civil War. Qiqihar was controlled by the Communists on April 24, 1946, along with other important regional cities like Changchun, Jilin City, and Harbin. Qiqihar was established as the capital of Heilongjiang Province after the foundation of People's Republic of China in 1949. However, after Songjiang Province was merged into Heilongjiang Province, the provincial capital was transferred to Harbin in 1954. During the first five-year plan of China from 1951 to 1956, many factories including Beiman Special Steel Co. and China First Heavy Industries were aid-constructed by the Soviet Union in Fularji District, making Qiqihar an important centre of equipment manufacturing industry in Northeast China. In 1984, Qiqihar was designated to be one of the 13 Larger Municipalities in China by the General Office of the State Council.

== Geography ==
Qiqihar City occupies a land area of 42,289 square kilometers at an altitude of 100–500 meters, with an average elevation of 146 meters.

=== Border ===
Qiqihar is located along the middle and lower reaches of the Nen River and the hinterland of Songnen Plain, which is adjacent to the Greater Khingan Range and Hulunbuir Prairie. Bordering prefecture cities are:

- Baicheng, Jilin (S)
- Daqing (E)
- Heihe (N)
- Hulunbuir, Inner Mongolia (W)
- Suihua (NE)
- Hinggan League, Inner Mongolia (W)

The city's metro area is located 359 km (223 mi) from the provincial capital of Harbin, 282 km (175 mi) from Baicheng, 139 km (86 mi) from Daqing, and 328 km (204 mi) from Suihua. The total area under the city's jurisdiction is 42,289 km^{2} (16,328 sq mi). The region's elevation above sea level is generally between 200 and 500 m (660 and 1,600 ft).

=== Climate ===
Qiqihar has a cold, monsoon-influenced, humid continental climate (Köppen Dwa), with four distinct seasons. It has long, bitterly cold, but dry winters, with a 24-hour average in January of −18.1 °C (−0.6 °F). Spring and fall are mild, but short and quick transitions. Summers are very warm and humid, with a 24-hour average in July of 23.3 °C (73.9 °F). The average annual precipitation is 415 millimetres (16.3 in), with over two-thirds of it falling from June to August. The annual mean is 4.38 °C (39.9 °F). With monthly percent possible sunshine ranging from 56% in July to 73% in February, the city receives abundant sunshine, with 2,839 hours of bright sunshine annually. Extreme temperatures have ranged from −39.5 °C (−39 °F) on January 8, 1956, to 42.1 °C (108 °F) on 26 June 1980. Unusually for a place with such cold winters, it has never experienced a temperature of -40 degrees (C/F) or lower.

Climate data for Qiqihar, elevation 147 m (482 ft), (1991–2020 normals, extremes 1951–present)
Month	Jan	Feb	Mar	Apr	May	Jun	Jul	Aug	Sep	Oct	Nov	Dec	Year
Record high °C (°F)	2.4 (36.3)	12.8 (55.0)	23.5 (74.3)	32.1 (89.8)	36.4 (97.5)	42.1 (107.8)	39.9 (103.8)	37.5 (99.5)	33.3 (91.9)	26.9 (80.4)	15.9 (60.6)	7.8 (46.0)	42.1 (107.8)
Mean daily maximum °C (°F)	−11.9 (10.6)	−6.0 (21.2)	3.1 (37.6)	13.7 (56.7)	21.6 (70.9)	26.8 (80.2)	28.5 (83.3)	26.5 (79.7)	21.0 (69.8)	11.8 (53.2)	−1.0 (30.2)	−10.6 (12.9)	10.3 (50.5)
Daily mean °C (°F)	−17.9 (−0.2)	−12.6 (9.3)	−3.2 (26.2)	7.4 (45.3)	15.6 (60.1)	21.3 (70.3)	23.8 (74.8)	21.7 (71.1)	15.3 (59.5)	6.0 (42.8)	−6.0 (21.2)	−15.8 (3.6)	4.6 (40.3)
Mean daily minimum °C (°F)	−22.9 (−9.2)	−18.6 (−1.5)	−9.3 (15.3)	1.0 (33.8)	9.5 (49.1)	16.0 (60.8)	19.4 (66.9)	17.4 (63.3)	10.2 (50.4)	1.0 (33.8)	−10.3 (13.5)	−20.3 (−4.5)	−0.6 (31.0)
Record low °C (°F)	−39.5 (−39.1)	−34.5 (−30.1)	−29.4 (−20.9)	−15.6 (3.9)	−7.4 (18.7)	1.9 (35.4)	9.9 (49.8)	5.4 (41.7)	−3.5 (25.7)	−16.0 (3.2)	−27.9 (−18.2)	−35.0 (−31.0)	−39.5 (−39.1)
Average precipitation mm (inches)	2.2 (0.09)	3.0 (0.12)	6.2 (0.24)	19.2 (0.76)	32.1 (1.26)	78.6 (3.09)	137.8 (5.43)	93.1 (3.67)	45.8 (1.80)	18.4 (0.72)	5.2 (0.20)	5.3 (0.21)	446.9 (17.59)
Average precipitation days (≥ 0.1 mm)	4.1	2.9	3.7	5.4	7.8	11.6	13.3	11.3	8.7	4.9	4.0	6.1	83.8
Average snowy days	6.4	4.2	5.4	2.5	0.2	0	0	0	0	1.9	5.6	8.1	34.3
Average relative humidity (%)	65	57	48	44	47	62	71	73	64	56	59	66	59
Mean monthly sunshine hours	195.3	215.0	262.4	255.6	272.0	269.4	261.0	260.3	251.0	224.1	183.8	170.2	2,820.1
Percentage possible sunshine	70	74	71	62	58	57	55	60	68	68	67	65	65
Source: China Meteorological AdministrationNOAA

== Subdivisions ==
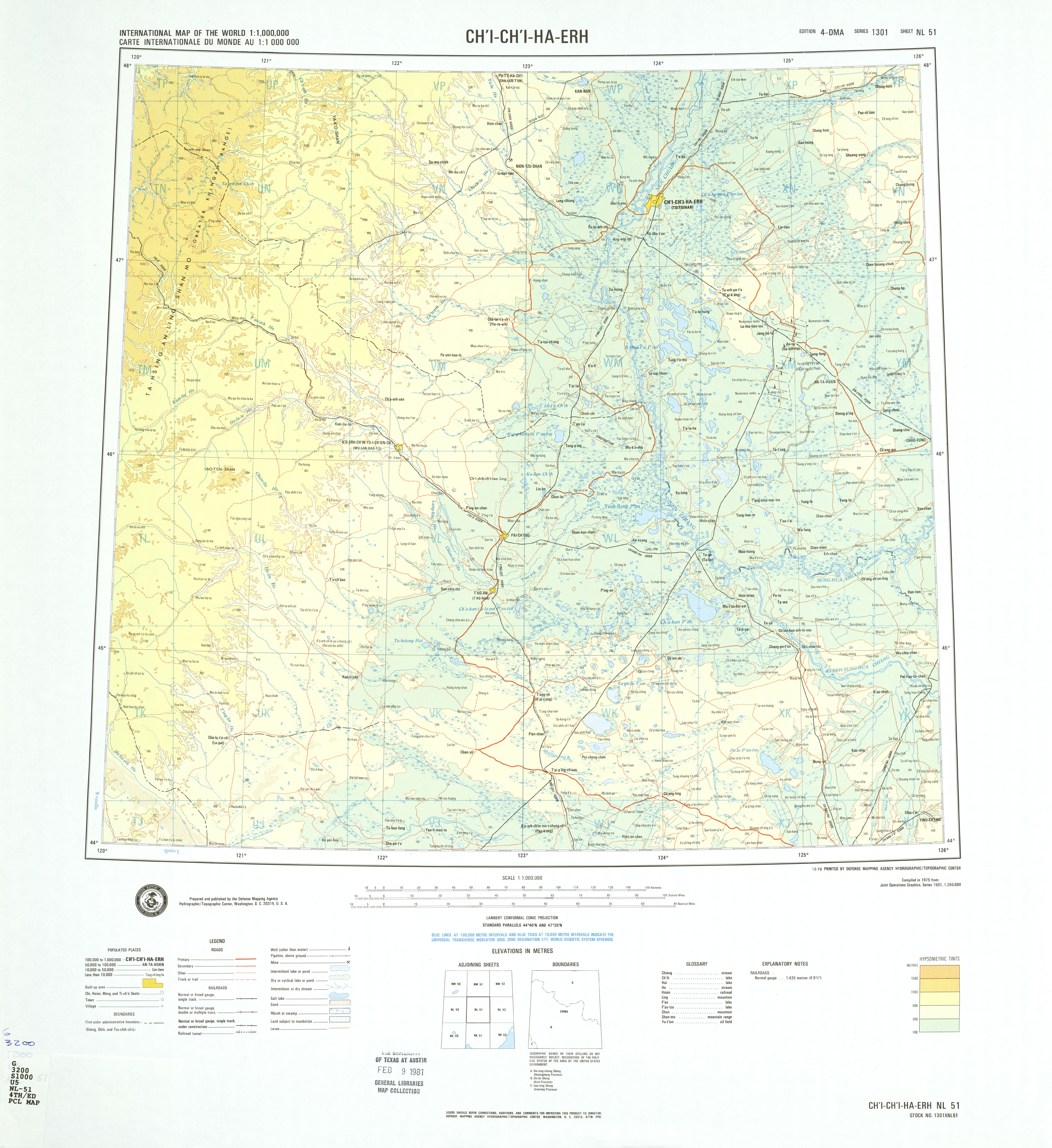
Map of Qiqihar (labeled as CH'I-CH'I-HA-ERH (TSITSIHAR)) and surrounding areas from the International Map of the World (1975)

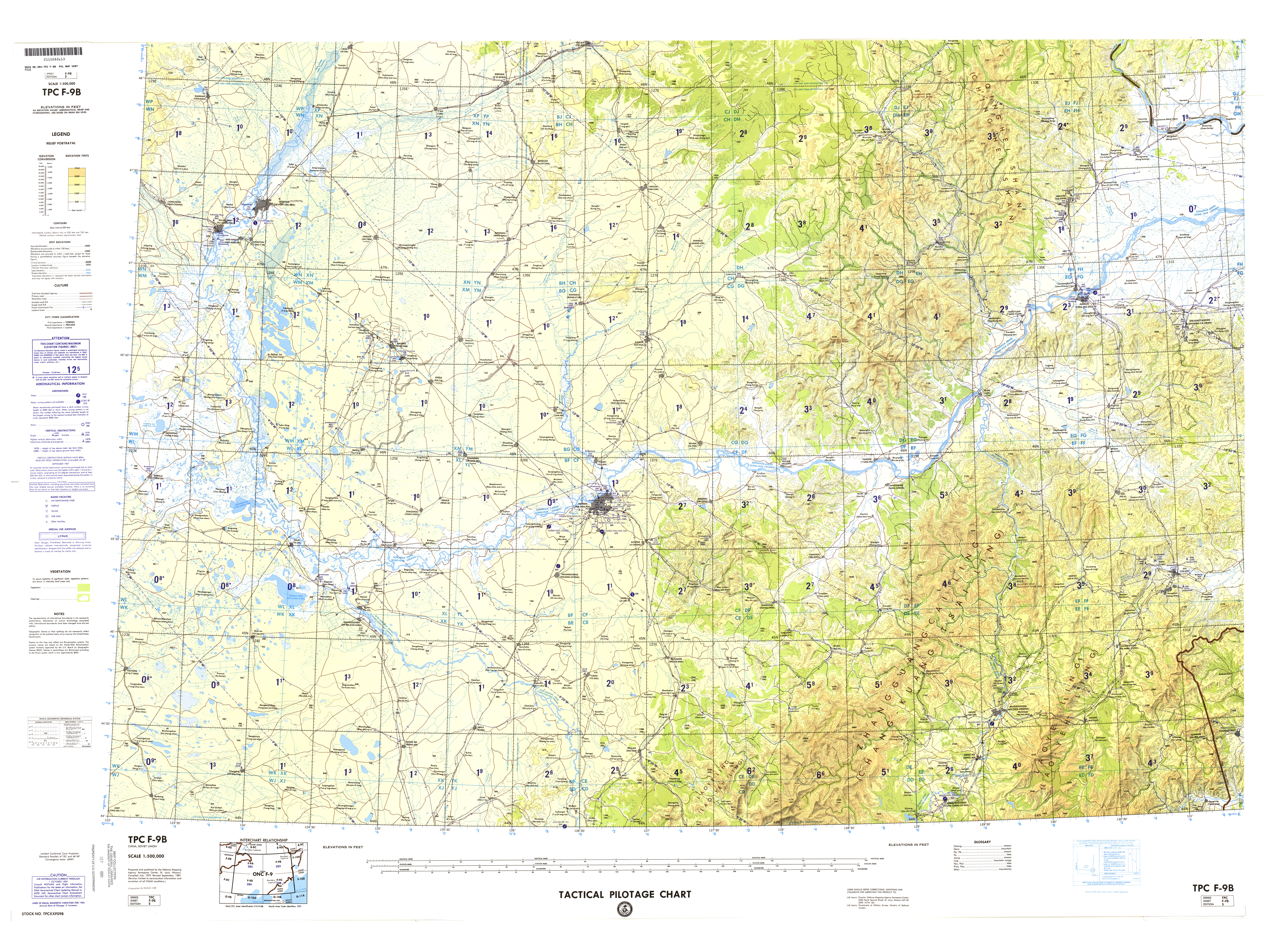
Map including Qiqihar

Qiqihar is divided into 16 divisions: 7 districts (区; qū), 8 counties (县; xiàn) and 1 county-level city (县级市; xiànjí shì).

Map
#	Name	Hanzi	Hanyu Pinyin	Population (2010 est.)	Area (km^{2})	Density (/km^{2})
1	Longsha District	龙沙区	Lóngshā Qū	354,987	283	1,254
2	Jianhua District	建华区	Jiànhuá Qū	292,579	81	3,612
3	Tiefeng District	铁锋区	Tiěfēng Qū	331,951	695	478
4	Ang'angxi District	昂昂溪区	Áng'ángxī Qū	80,109	623	129
5	Fularji District	富拉尔基区	Fùlā'ěrjī Qū	256,159	375	683
6	Nianzishan District	碾子山区	Niǎnzishān Qū	72,151	290	249
7	Meilisi Daur District	梅里斯达斡尔族区	Méilǐsī Dáwò'ěrzú Qū	165,852	1,948	85
8	Nehe City	讷河市	Nèhé Shì	625,892	6,664	94
9	Longjiang County	龙江县	Lóngjiāng Xiàn	572,764	6,197	92
10	Yi'an County	依安县	Yī'ān Xiàn	480,035	3,780	127
11	Tailai County	泰来县	Tàilái Xiàn	302,027	4,061	74
12	Gannan County	甘南县	Gānnán Xiàn	368,734	4,384	84
13	Fuyu County	富裕县	Fùyù Xiàn	276,537	4,335	64
14	Keshan County	克山县	Kèshān Xiàn	403,175	3,632	111
15	Kedong County	克东县	Kèdōng Xiàn	264,285	2,083	127
16	Baiquan County	拜泉县	Bàiquán Xiàn	519,766	3,569	146

== Demographics ==
According to the Seventh national population census, the population amounted to 4,067,489. Compared with 5,367,003 people in the Sixth national census in 2010, it decreased by 1,299,514 people, a drop of 24.21%, with an average annual growth rate of -2.73%.

There were 2,044,598 males, accounting for 50.27%. There were 2,022,891 women, accounting for 49.73%. The sex ratio (with females as 100, the proportion of males to females) decreased from 102.00 in the Sixth national census in 2010 to 101.07.

== Economy ==
Qiqihar is a heavily industrialized city involved in manufacturing.

In 2009, the city's 95 large-scale equipment manufacturing enterprises, with total assets of 30.6 billion yuan, accounting for the city's industrial enterprises above designated size of 46.5% of total assets, the number of employees 5.2 million, accounting for the city's industrial enterprises above the size of 45.6% of the total number of employees. The main business income of 25.57 billion yuan, industrial added value of 8.05 billion yuan, profits of 1.96 billion yuan, 1.03 billion yuan of taxes, respectively, year on year growth of 2.9%, 3%, 19.6% and 22.3%, accounting for the city's industrial enterprises above designated size were 40.6%, 40%, 44.3% and 31.7%, respectively.

=== Hospitals ===
Qiqihar has 23 hospitals.

=== Companies ===
Companies conducting business in Qiqihar include RT-Mart, Walmart, GOME Electrical Appliances, and Suning Commerce Group.

=== Banks ===
Since Qiqihar is a large city, numerous banks are represented here. Some of the banks include Bank of China, China Construction Bank, Industrial and Commercial Bank of China, and Agricultural Bank of China.

== Tourism ==
Qiqihar is very close to the Zhalong Nature Reserve and the Longsha park.

== Transportation ==
=== Airport ===
Qiqihar is served by its own domestic airport, Qiqihar Sanjiazi Airport.

=== Trains ===
Qiqihar is well connected in terms of railway transportation. Trains from Qiqihar Railway Station connect the city with Harbin, Beijing, Dalian, Hangzhou, Xi'an and several other major cities in China. Qiqihar Sanjiazi Airport, 13 km (8.1 mi) from Qiqihar's downtown area, operates daily flights to Beijing, Guangzhou, Shanghai and other major cities in China. In the district of Ang'angxi, the Harbin-Manzhouli Railway intersects with the Qiqihar-Bei'an Railway.

The Harbin–Qiqihar intercity railway opened on 17 August 2015; it provides frequent high-speed service to Harbin, as well as some direct trains to Beijing.

=== River ===
The Nen River is used to transport freight.

=== Gallery ===
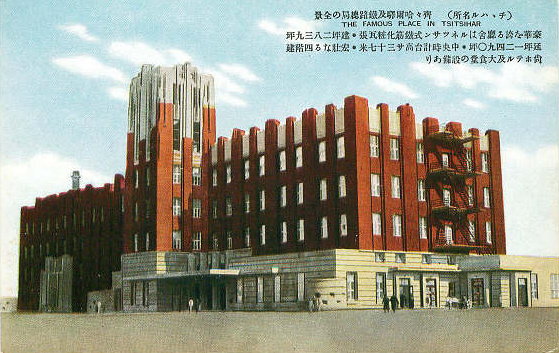
The old station building, now used for first class

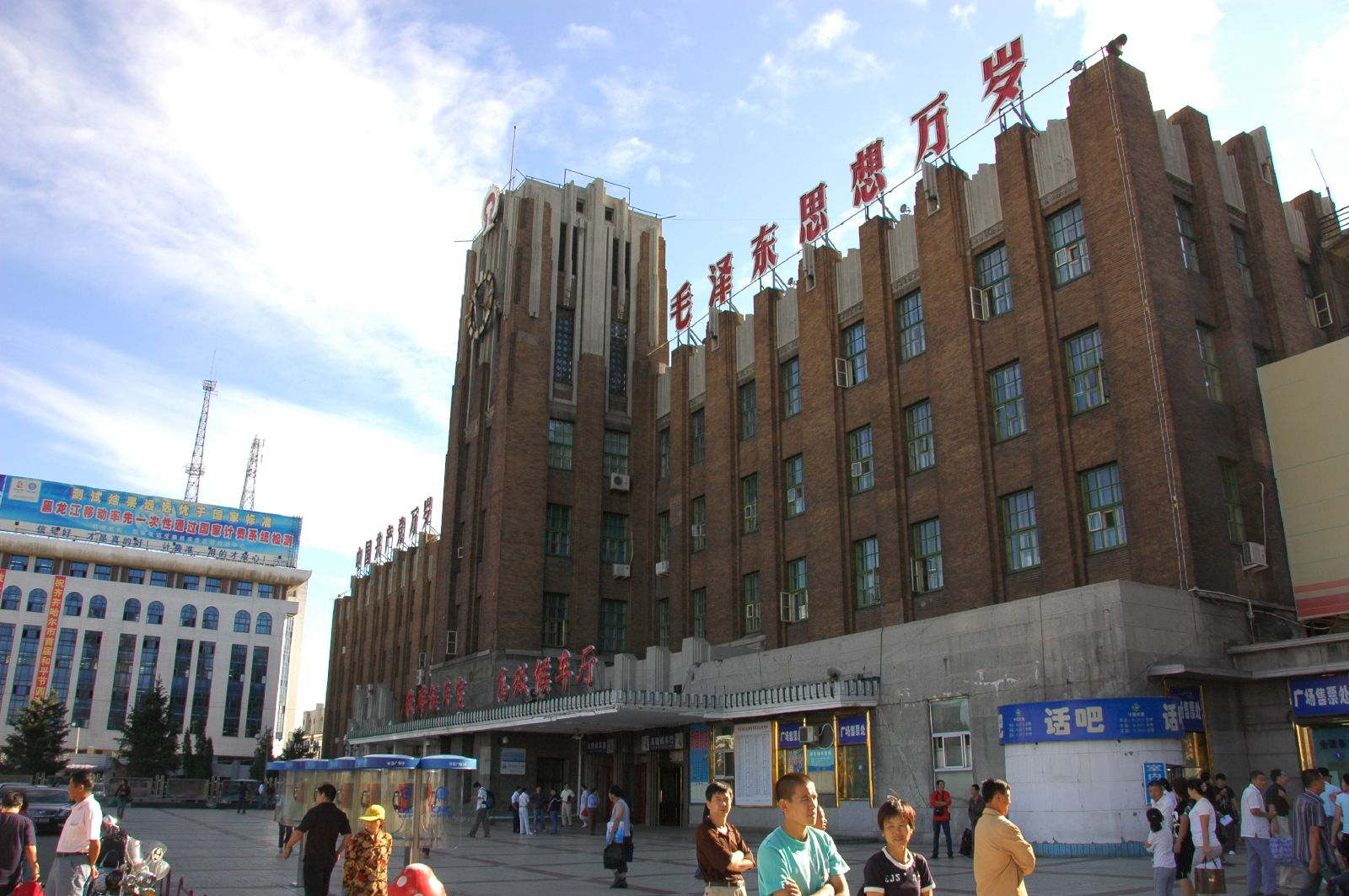
The old station building

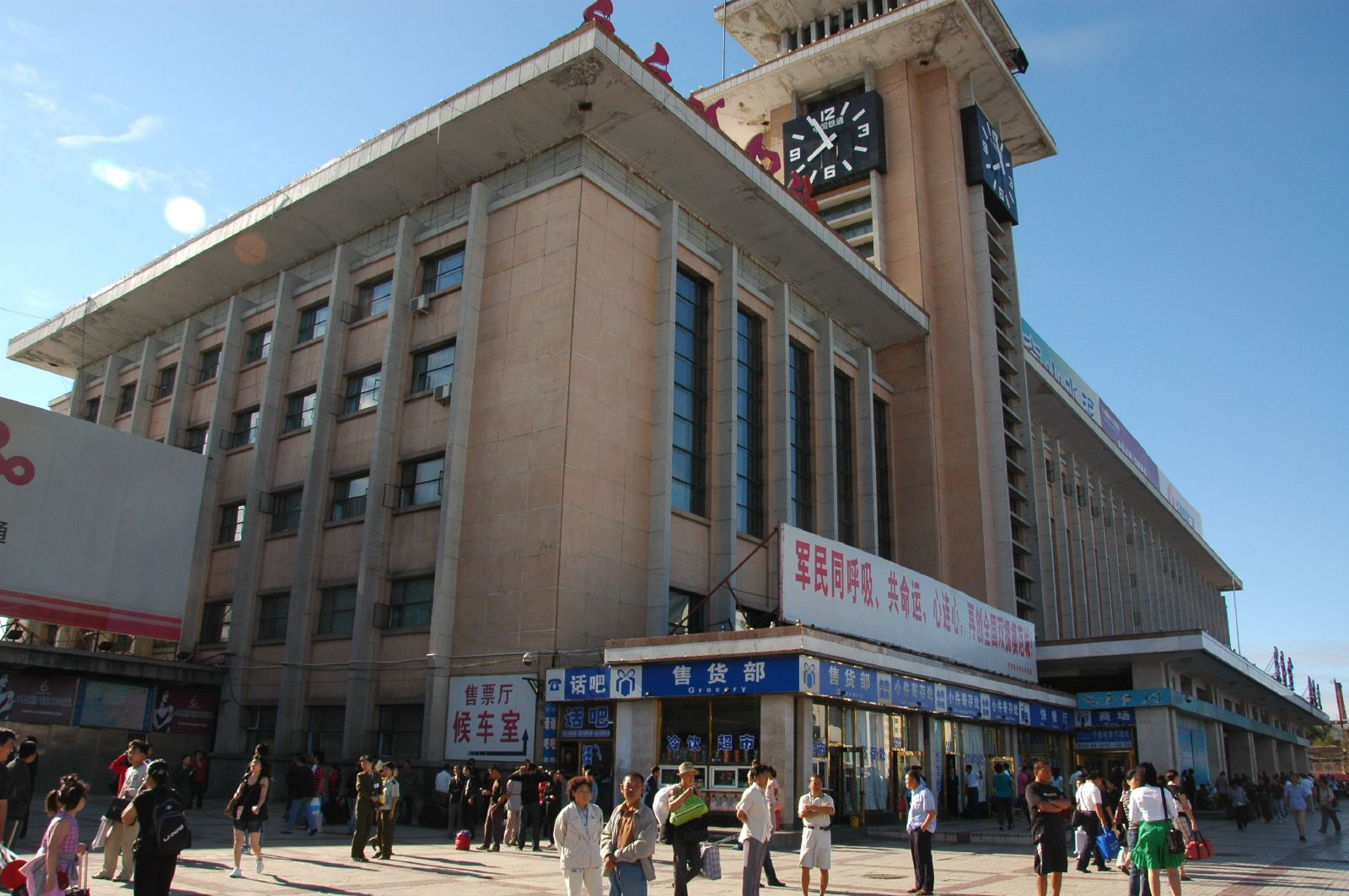
The new station building

== Education ==
Numerous schools exist in the city. Four elementary schools feed into 8 city or county high schools.

There are two universities: Qiqihar University and its medical school.

== Sister cities ==
- New Castle County, Delaware, United States
- Utsunomiya, Tochigi, Japan
- Goyang, Gyeonggi, South Korea
- 10th of Ramadan, Egypt
- Krasnoyarsk, Russia

== Notable people from Qiqihar ==
- Wanrong - Princess consort to Puyi
- Ma Zhanshan - General
- Zhou Tienong - Vice chair of Standing committee of Congress of China
- Chen Yunlin - politician
- Zhai Zhigang - Astronaut
- Liu Boming - Astronaut
- Bai Xue - 10,000 meter runner
- Mao Buyi - singer-songwriter
- Li Yingying - Chinese female national volleyballer
- Wang Manyu - Table tennis player
- Tu Honggang - Singer
