= 2021 in rail transport =

This article lists events related to rail transport that occurred in 2021.

== Events ==
=== January ===
- (United Kingdom) January 4 – The Island Line, Isle of Wight temporarily closes for renovations and Class 483 units are withdrawn from service. The cars originally operated on the London Underground starting in 1938.
- (China) January 22 – Opening of the full Beijing–Shenyang high-speed railway.
- (France) January 28 – Opening of Porte de Clichy station on Paris Métro Line 14.

=== February ===
- February 7 – Transport for Wales Rail takes over the Wales & Borders franchise from KeolisAmey Wales.
- February 27 – Metrorrey Line 3 commences operation in Monterrey, Mexico.

=== March ===
- (Brazil) March 4 – Opening of 172 km (107 mi) stretch of North-South Railway.
- (Egypt) March 26 – Sohag train collision
- (South Korea) March 27 – Line 5 of the Seoul Subway is extended to Hanam Geomdansan.

=== April ===
- (Russia) April 1 – The Moscow Metro Bolshaya Koltsevaya line is extended to Mnyovniki.
- (Japan) April 1 – Formal closure of the Hidaka Main Line in Hokkaido
- (Taiwan) April 2 – Hualien train derailment
- (New Zealand) April 6 – The Te Huia passenger service between Hamilton and Papakuri begins, including the opening of a new transit hub in Hamilton.
- April 10 – The Île-de-France tramway Line 9 opens.
- (Egypt) April 18 – Toukh train accident
- (Bulgaria) April 24 – Line 3 of the Sofia Metro is extended from Krasno Selo to Gorna Banya
- (Taiwan) April 25 – Taichung MRT's Green line commences operation in Taichung. The line had opened the previous November, but was shut down for repairs after trains exhibited faulty couplers.

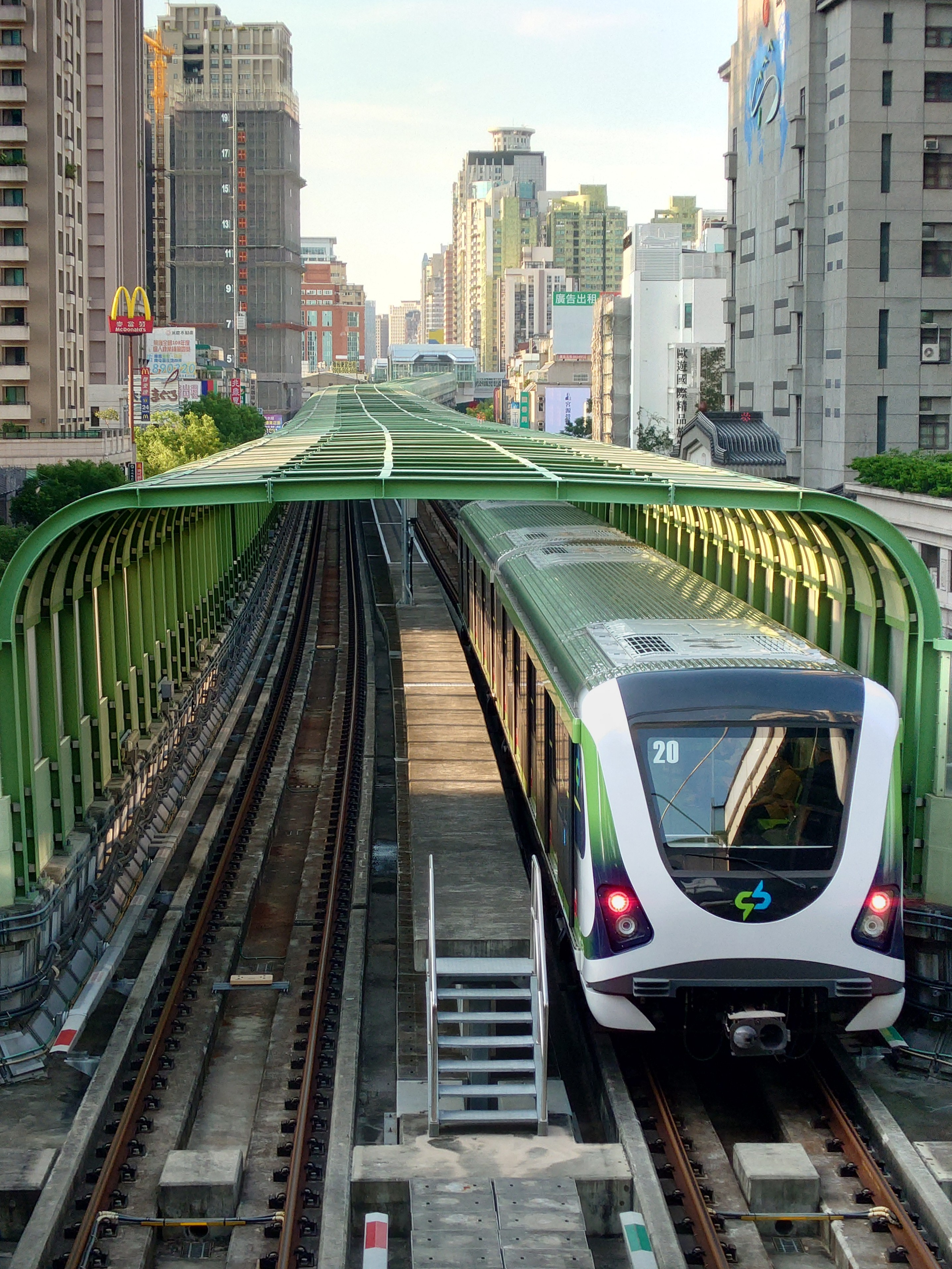
The Taichung MRT Green line at Feng-le Park station

- (Russia) (Belarus) April 30 – Lastochka begins operating passenger services from Moscow to Minsk.

=== May ===
- May 3 – Mexico City Metro overpass collapse
- (Sweden) (Germany) May 6 – Flixtrain begins operating long-distance passenger services from Stockholm to Gothenburg.
- (Spain) May 10 – SNCF open-access operator Ouigo España begins low-cost high-speed rail passenger services over the Madrid–Barcelona high-speed rail line.
- (Malaysia) May 24 – Kelana Jaya LRT collision
- (Azerbaijan) May 29 – The Purple Line of the Baku Metro is extended from Memar Ajami (Baku Metro) to 8 Noyabr (Baku Metro)

=== June ===
- (Pakistan) June 7 – 2021 Ghotki train collision: The Millat Express from Karachi derails near Daharki in Sindh province and the Sir Syed Express coming in the opposite direction collides with it and overturns, killing at least 50.
- (Spain) June 23 – Renfe begins Avlo low-cost high-speed rail passenger services over the Madrid–Barcelona high-speed rail line.
- June 25
  - (China) – Lhasa-Nyingchi Railway, Xiamen Metro Line 3 begins operation.
  - (China) – The first phase of Jiaxing Tram begins operation.
- (China) June 26 – Zhengzhou Metro Line 3 Extension begins operation.
- (Hong Kong) June 27 – The Tuen Ma Line fully opens, with a new section between Hung Hom and Kai Tak.
- (China) June 28 – Mianyang–Luzhou high-speed railway (Neijiang-Zigong-Luzhou section), Hangzhou Metro Line 8, Hangzhou–Haining intercity railway, Shaoxing Metro Line 1 (Keqiao–Guniangqiao section), Changzhou Metro Line 2, Xuzhou Metro Line 3 begins operation.
- (China) June 29 – Xi'an Metro Line 14 begins operation and merges with the former Airport Intercity Line; Suzhou Metro Line 5 begins operation.
- June 30 – Metro Express (Mauritius) extended by 2 stations (Phase 2A).

=== July ===
- (Philippines) July 5 – Manila LRT Line 2 East Extension opens.
- (China) July 20 – 2021 Henan floods overwhelm part of Zhengzhou Metro Line 5, killing 14.

=== August ===
- (Thailand) August 2 – SRT Dark Red Line of Bangkok suburban railway system begins operation.
- (Czech Republic) August 4 – Milavče train crash
- (India) August 6 – The final section of the Delhi Metro Pink Line between Trilokpuri Sanjay Lake and Mayur Vihar Pocket I opens after being previously delayed due to land acquisition and rehabilitation issues.
- (Finland) August 9 – The Tampere light rail system begins operation with Lines 1 and 3.
- (China) August 18 – The initial section of Foshan Nanhai Tram Line 1 opened.
- (China) August 26 – Line 7 and Batong line of Beijing Subway extended to Universal Resort station.
- (Singapore) August 28 – Thomson–East Coast MRT line Stage 2 opens.
- (China) August 29 – Through operation of Line 1 and Batong line of Beijing Subway started.

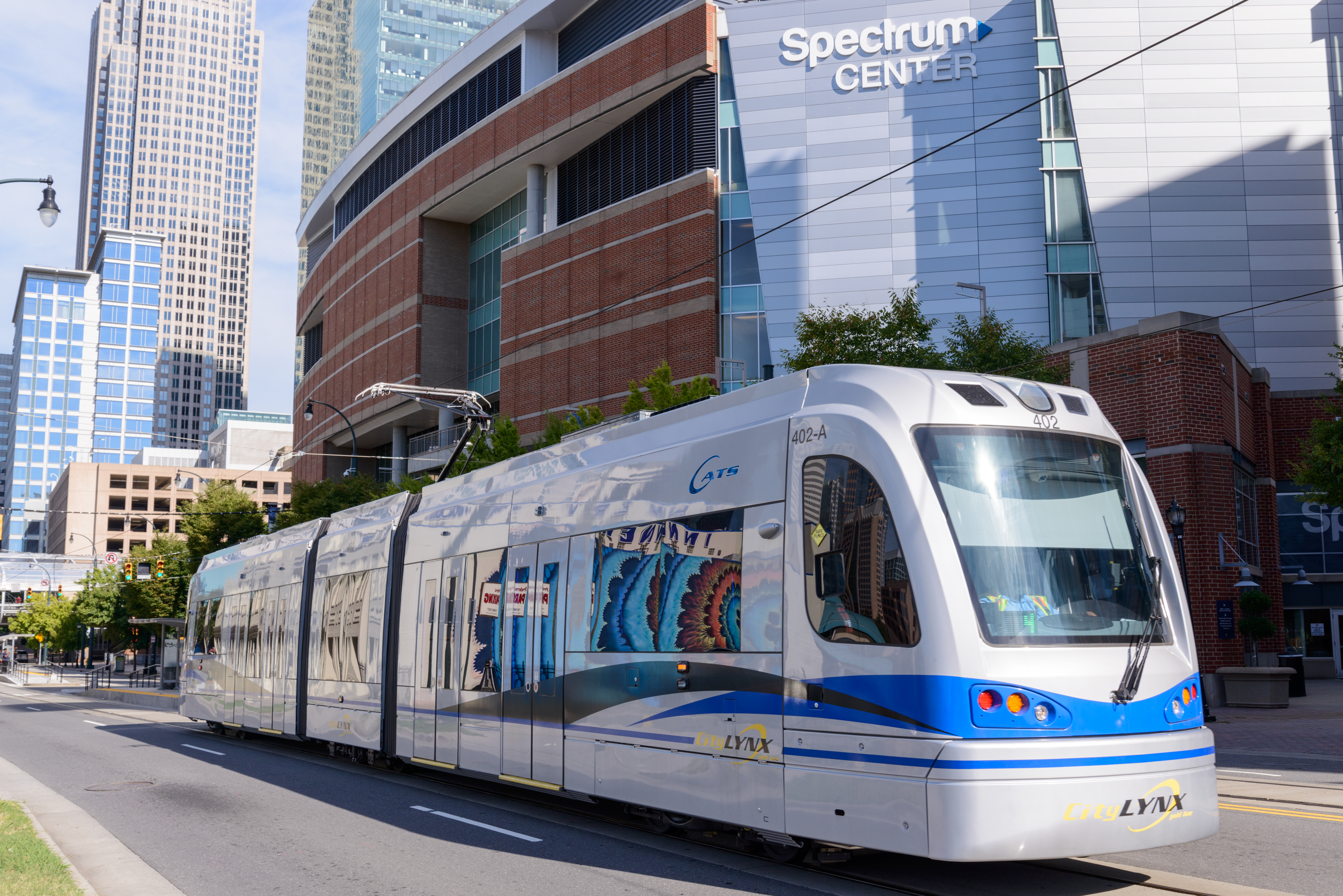
A Siemens S700 streetcar in service on the CityLynx Gold Line in Charlotte, North Carolina, USA. (September 2021)

- (United States) August 30 – Opening of the Center City Corridor expansion of LYNX streetcar service in Charlotte, North Carolina.

=== September ===
- (China) September 19 – Opening of Line 2 of Harbin Metro.
- (United Kingdom) September 20 – Opening of the Northern line extension to Battersea in London.
- (United States) September 25 – Montana train derailment

=== October ===
- (United States) October 2 – Opening of the Northgate Link extension in Seattle.
- (Turkey) October 25 – Opening of the T3 line of AntRay tram in Antalya between Varsak and Müze stations.
- (Turkey) October 25 – Opening of the Odunluk station of Bursaray in Bursa.
- (United Kingdom) (England) October 31 – Salisbury rail crash

=== November ===
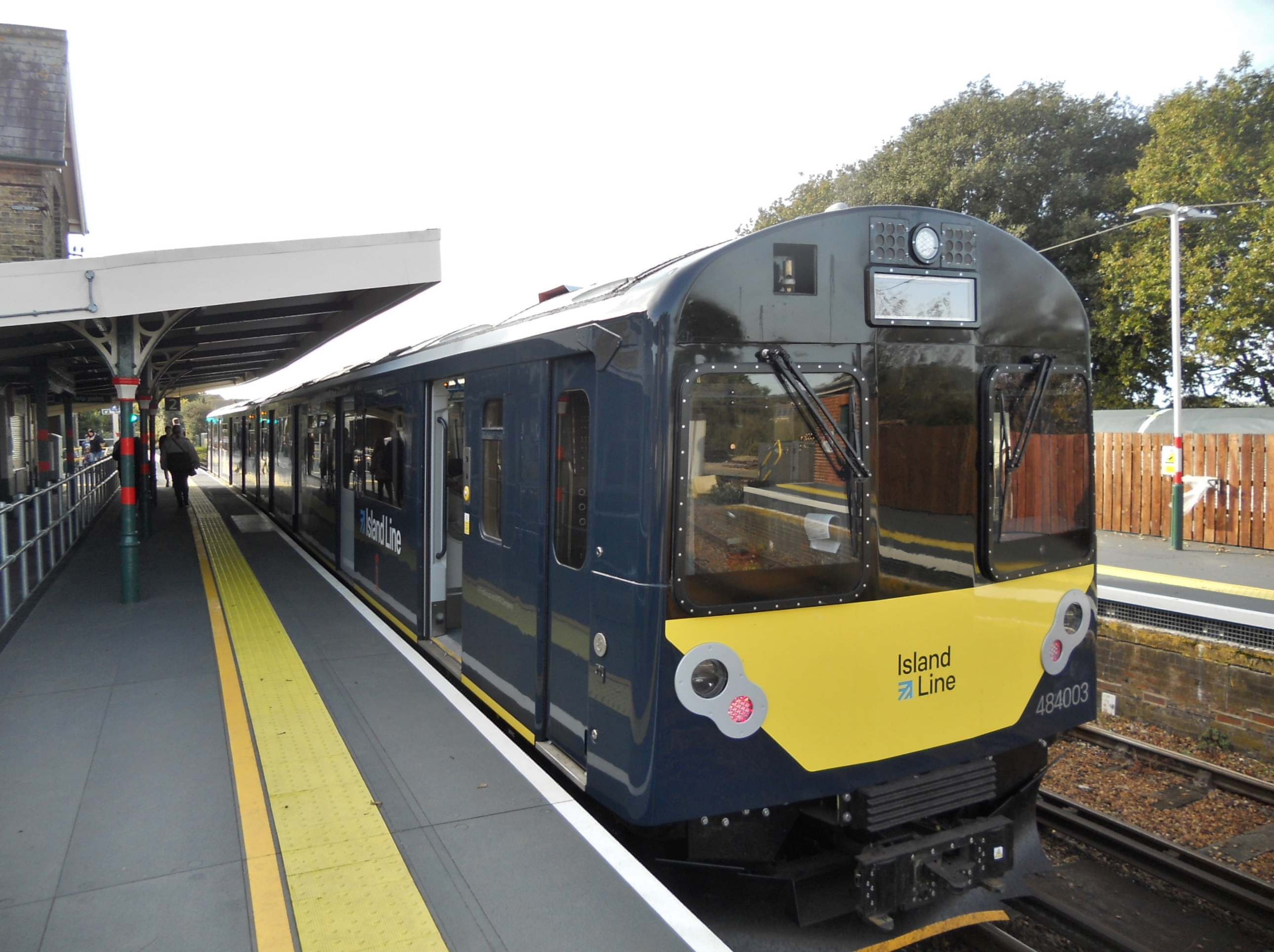
Class 484 units in service at Sandown railway station on the Island Line, Isle of Wight

- (United Kingdom) November 1 – The Island Line, Isle of Wight recommenced service after upgrades and began using Class 484 units.
- (Vietnam) November 6 – Opening of Hanoi Metro. The first line 2A (Cat Linh Line) started to operate.
- (United States) November 18 – Amtrak Cascades service restarts over the Point Defiance Bypass. The rail line was closed in 2017 after the service's inaugural run through the corridor resulted in a derailment.
- (United Kingdom) November 20 – Regular scheduled passenger services recommence on the Dartmoor Line between Crediton and Okehampton.
- November 21
  - (United States) – The Mid-Coast Trolley extension of the San Diego Trolley Blue Line opens for service in San Diego, California.
  - (Philippines) – The Philippine National Railways' first standard-gauge electric multiple unit stock for the North–South Commuter Railway was delivered.
- (China) November 26 – Harbin Metro Line 3 was extended on both ends to Sports Park on the west and to Taipingqiao on the east.

=== December ===
- December 3
  - (Laos) – Boten–Vientiane railway opens.
  - (China) – Yuxi–Mohan railway opens.
- (Russia) December 7 – 10 stations of the Bolshaya Koltsevaya line of the Moscow Metro, between Mnyovniki and Kakhovskaya, open.
- (Germany) December 11 – Karlsruhe Stadtbahn city centre tunnel opened.
- (Taiwan) December 16 – Kaohsiung begins trial run of the section between Gushan District Office and TRA Museum of Fine Arts stations on the Circular light rail.
- (Brazil) December 17 – São Paulo Metro Line 4 extension to Vila Sônia opens.
- (Senegal) December 27 – TER Dakar phase 1 opening.
- December 28
  - (India) – The inaugural section of Kanpur Metro with nine stations opened.
  - (China) – Opening of the Nanjing Metro Line S6, and the west extension of Line 2.
- (Brazil) December 29 – Opening of São Paulo Metro Line 15 extension to Jardim Colonial.
- (China) December 31 – Opening of Line 11, Line 17, Line 19; extensions of Capital Airport Express, Changping line, Line S1, Line 16; and the central sections of Line 8 and Line 14 of Beijing Subway.

== Industry awards ==
=== Japan ===
Awards presented by Japan Railfan Club

- 2021 Blue Ribbon Award: Kintetsu 80000 series Hinotori EMU, Kintetsu
- 2021 Laurel Prize: E261 series EMU JR East, N700S Series Shinkansen JR Central

=== North America ===
Awards presented by Railway Age magazine

- 2021 Railroader of the Year: Keith Creel (CP)
