= Line 1 (Harbin Metro) =

Harbin Metro line

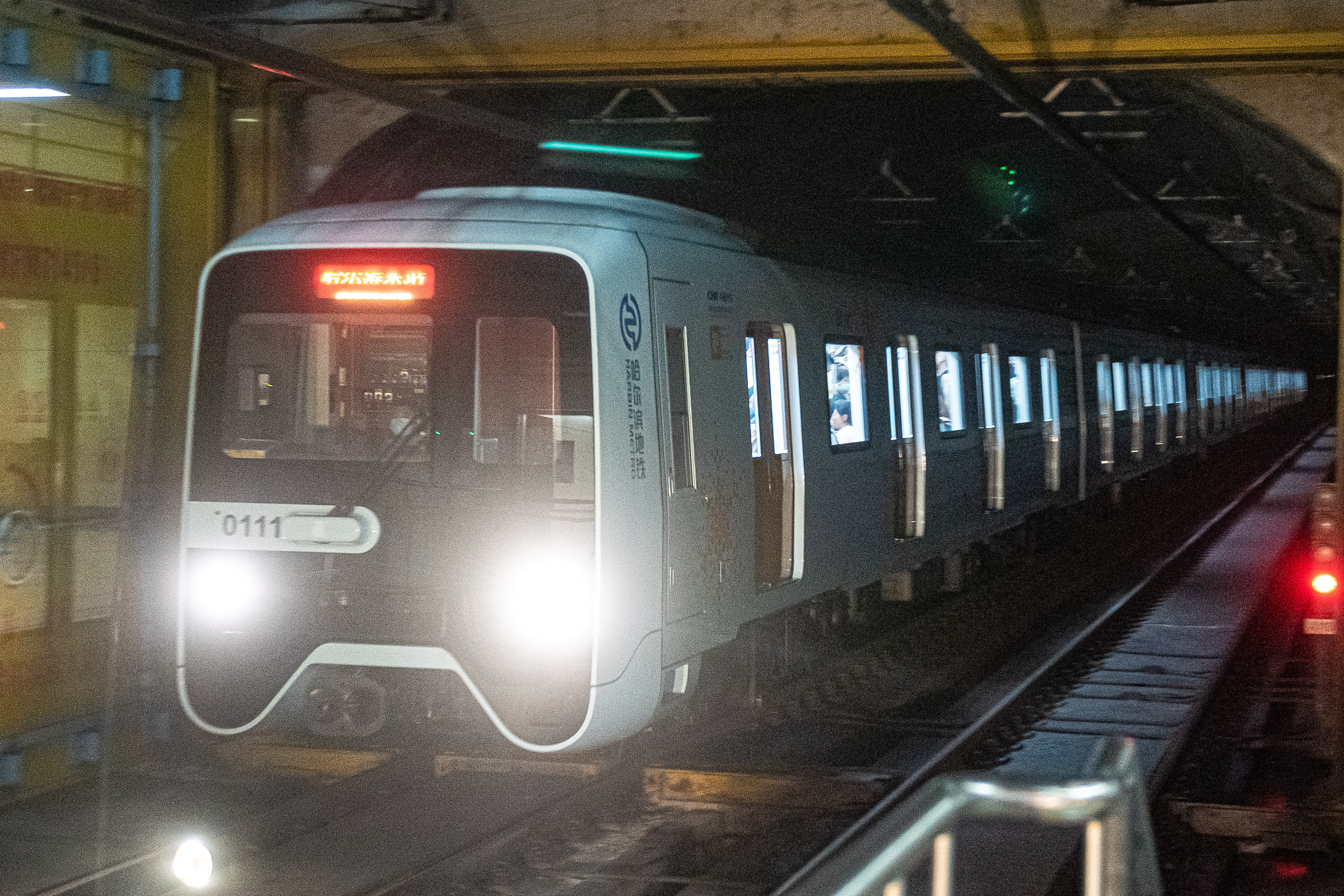
- A Harbin Metro Line 1 train

Overview
- Status: Operational
- Owner: Harbin
- Locale: Harbin, Heilongjiang, China
- Termini: Harbin East Railway Station; Xinjiang Street
- Stations: 23

Service
- Type: Rapid transit
- System: Harbin Metro
- Services: 1
- Operator(s): Harbin Metro Group Corporation

History
- Opened: 26 September 2013; 12 years ago

Technical
- Line length: 26.05 km (16.19 mi)
- Number of tracks: 2
- Character: Underground
- Track gauge: 1,435 mm (4 ft 8 1/2 in)

Line 1 of the Harbin Metro (Chinese: 哈尔滨地铁一号线; pinyin: Hārbīn Dìtiě Yī Hào Xiàn) is a rapid transit line running from west to east Harbin. It was open on the 26 September 2013. This line is 26.05 km long with 23 stations.

== History ==
The Phase 1 & 2 opened on 26 September 2013.

Museum of Heilongjiang Province station opened as an infill station on 23 September 2014.

The Phase 3 (except Wapenyao station) opened on 10 April 2019.

Wapenyao station opened as an infill station on 28 September 2019.

=== Opening timeline ===
Segment	Commencement	Length	Station(s)	Name
Harbin East Railway Station — Harbin South Railway Station	26 September 2013	17.47 km (10.86 mi)	17	Phase 1 & 2
Museum of Heilongjiang Province	23 September 2014	Infill station	1	
Harbin South Railway Station — Xinjiang Street	10 April 2019	8.58 km (5.33 mi)	4	Phase 3
Wapenyao	28 September 2019	Infill station	1	

== Stations (north to south) ==
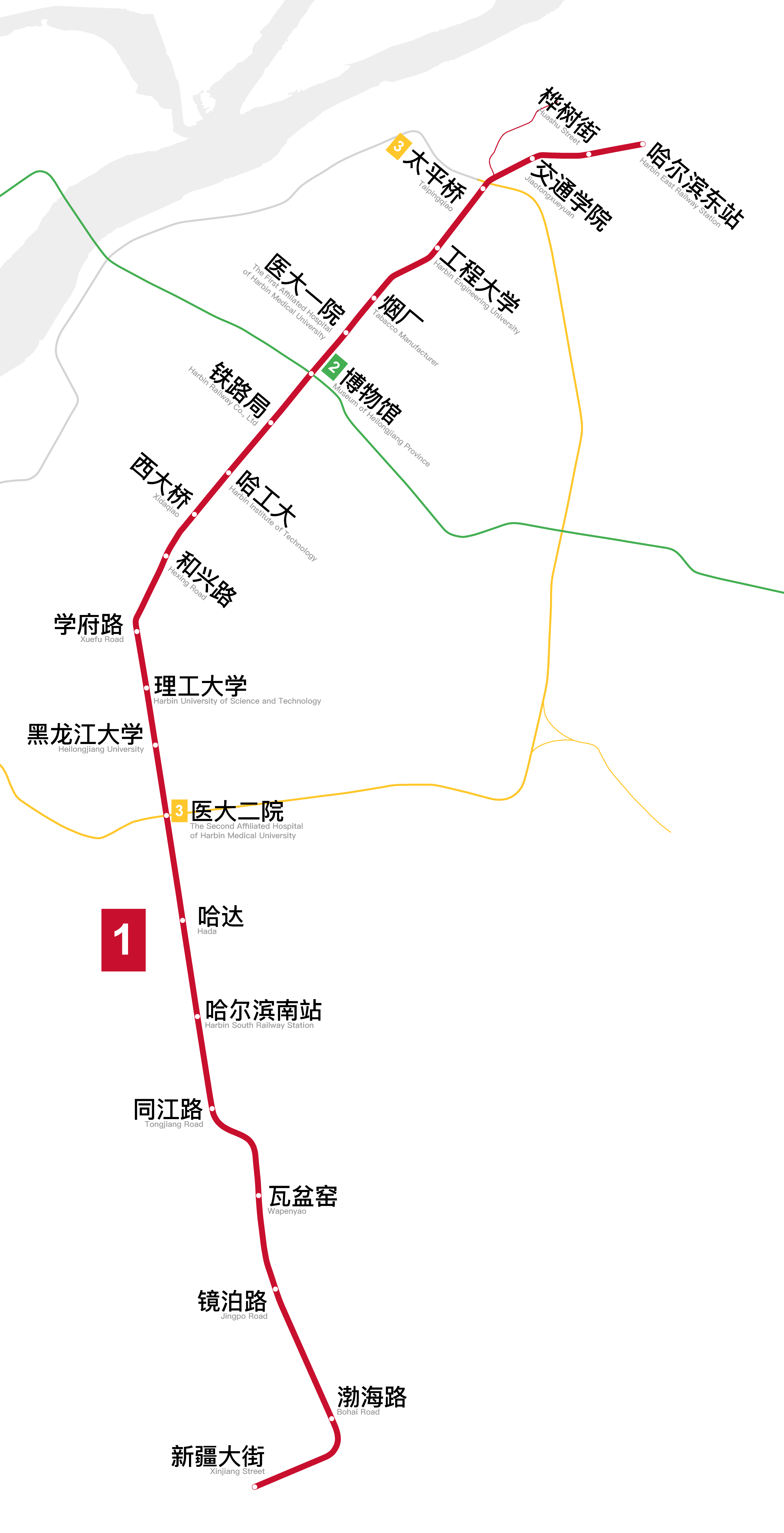

Station name		Connections	Nearby Bus Stops	Distance km		Location	First train		Last train	
English	Chinese	Connections	Nearby Bus Stops	Distance km		Location	Harbin East Railway Station	Xinjiang Street	Harbin East Railway Station	Xinjiang Street
Harbin East Railway Station	哈尔滨东站	VBB	6 27 33 35 90 203 332 Airport-3	0.00	0.00	Daowai	—	6:00	—	21:00
Huashu Street	桦树街		27 55 74 76 90 93 116 367	0.90	0.90	Daowai	6:33	6:02	21:32	21:01
Jiaotongxueyuan	交通学院		74	0.85	1.75	Daowai	6:31	6:04	21:30	21:03
Taipingqiao	太平桥	3	104 105	0.90	2.65	Daowai	6:29	6:06	21:28	21:05
Harbin Engineering University	工程大学			1.10	3.75	Nangang	6:27	6:08	21:26	21:07
Tobacco Manufacturer	烟厂		6 14 33 37 55 74 104	1.30	5.05	Nangang	6:24	6:10	21:24	21:10
The First Affiliated Hospital of Harbin Medical University	医大一院		10 14 33 74	0.80	5.85	Nangang	6:22	6:11	21:22	21:12
Museum of Heilongjiang Province	博物馆	2	10 104	0.60	6.45	Nangang				
Harbin Railway Co., Ltd	铁路局		104 107 111	1.00	7.45	Nangang	6:19	6:15	21:19	21:15
Harbin Institute of Technology	哈工大		64	1.00	8.45	Nangang	6:17	6:17	21:17	21:17
Xidaqiao	西大桥		9 10 11 31 63 75 77 82 82区间; 88 90 91 92 104 107 110环线 111 336 336区间	0.85	9.30	Nangang	6:15	6:19	21:15	21:19
Hexing Road	和兴路		67 90 102 110环线; 111 117 363 363支4	0.80	10.1	Nangang	6:13	6:21	21:13	21:21
Xuefu Road	学府路		104 106	1.25	11.35	Nangang	6:10	6:23	21:10	21:23
Harbin University of Science and Technology	理工大学		11 31 67 68 87 88 94 104 106; 107 209 336 336区间	0.85	12.20	Nangang	6:09	6:26	21:08	21:25
Heilongjiang University	黑龙江大学		11 31 67 68 83 88 94 104 106; 114 202 209 336 336区间 343 363支4	0.90	13.10	Nangang	6:07	6:27	21:07	21:27
The Second Affiliated Hospital of Harbin Medical University	医大二院	3	11 67 68 69 104 106 114 203; 217 218 218支 220 343 369 602	1.05	14.15	Nangang	6:04	6:29	21:04	21:29
Hada	哈达		68 104 114 218 220 343 369	1.60	15.75	Nangang	6:02	6:32	21:02	21:32
Harbin South Railway Station	哈尔滨南站	VNB	68 104 114 220 343 369	1.50	17.25	Nangang	6:00	—	21:00	—
Tongjiang Road	同江路					Nangang				
Wapenyao	瓦盆窑					Xiangfang				
Jingpo Road	镜泊路					Xiangfang				
Bohai Road	渤海路					Xiangfang				
Xinjiang Street	新疆大街					Pingfang				
