= Chinese Baroque Street =

Neighborhood in Harbin, China

- Native name: 中华巴洛克风情街 (Chinese)
- Area: Jingyang Street - Jingyu Street - South 4th Street - Nanxun Street (景阳街—靖宇街—南四道街—南勋街)
- Location: Harbin, China

Other
- Known for: Unique architectural style - combination of Baroque and Chinese Siheyuan styles

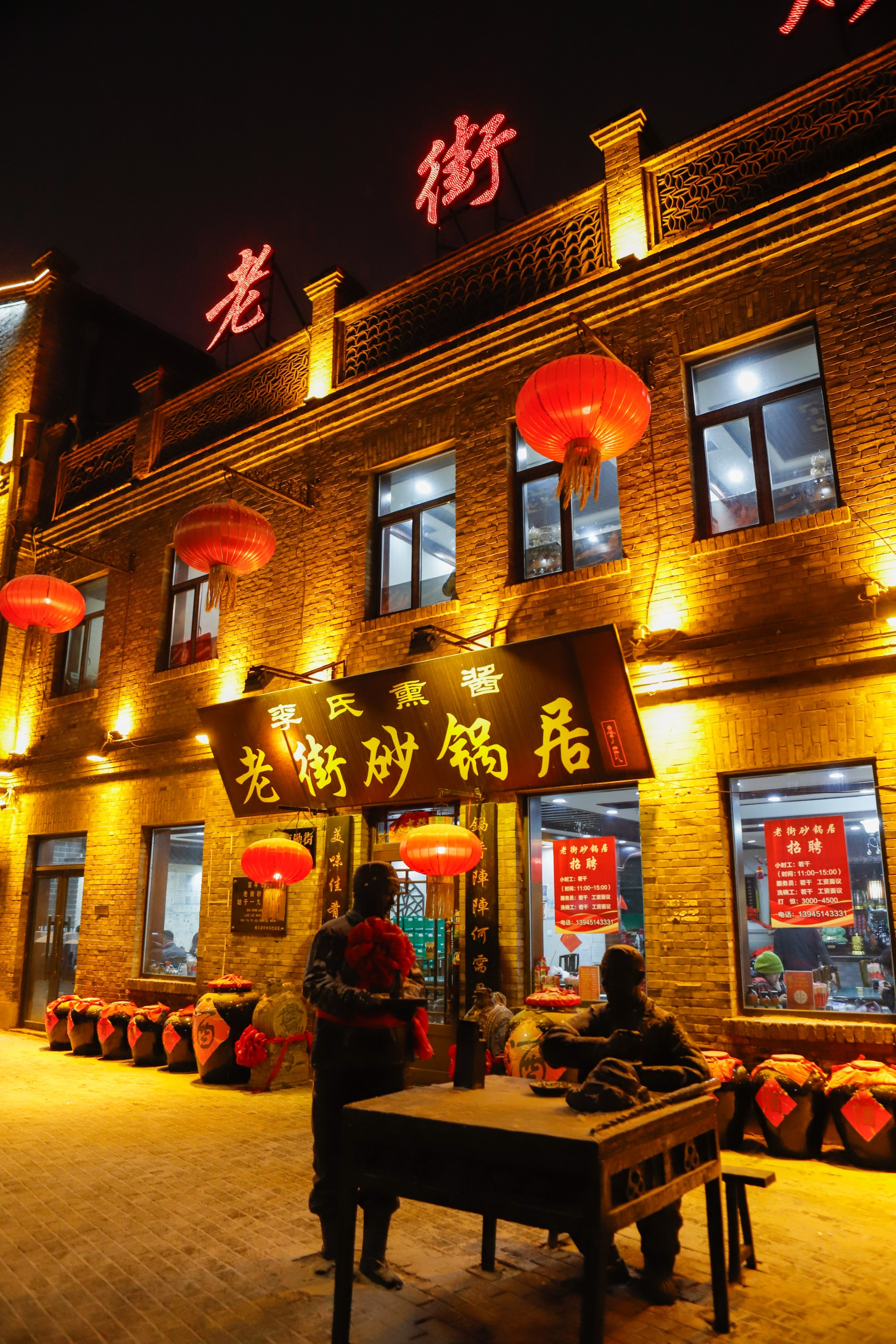
Chinese Baroque Street, Harbin, 2025

Chinese Baroque Street (Chinese: 中华巴洛克风情街) or Lao Daowai (老道外) is a neighborhood and tourist destination located in Daowai District, Harbin, China. The street is known for its high historic value and integrated architectural style of Baroque façades and Chinese quads (Siheyuan). It is the largest existing area of Baroque buildings in China.

== History ==
In first half of the 20th century, Harbin was divided into two parts - the eastern district (today Daoli and Nangang) for Russian, Jewish and Polish people, and the western part (then named Fujiadian, today Daowai) part for the Chinese. A number of architectures in various styles including eclectic, Baroque, Renaissance and modern are built in eastern part of the city. The Chinese industrialists in the western part of the city built their shops and residences resembling European styles, but adopted Chinese construction methods, resulting in European façades and Chinese quads (Yuan Luo).

In 2010s, the neighborhood was refurbished and transferred into a tourist destination and reopened to public in 2014. Later, a number of nostalgic films and television dramas were shot in the neighborhood.

Notable brands developed from the street include Lao Ding Feng Food (老鼎丰) and Heng De Li Glasses (亨得利).

== "Chinese Baroque" ==
The concept "Chinese Baroque" (中华巴洛克) was first put forward by Japanese architectural historian Yasuhiko Nishizawa, referring to the mixed architectural style.

Key features of Chinese Baroque architecture include:

- Integration of Chinese Dougong and stairs with European pediment and column: For example, dougong was added to the columns on the building of Chunhua Hospital (纯化医院).
- Adopting Chinese symbols on cameo carvings: typical examples include grapes and pomegranate, symbols of more offspring; Chinese peony, plum blossom and flowering apple symbolizing prosperity in the Chinese culture.
- Integration of European façades and Chinese quads: Almost all of such architectures have Chinese quads with traditional Chinese decorations.
