= 2017 in rail transport =

This article lists events related to rail transport that occurred in 2017.

== Events ==
=== January ===
- (United States) January 1 – Phase I of New York City's Second Avenue Subway is opened for revenue service after almost a century of planning.
- (United Kingdom) January 1–18 – First scheduled through railborne intermodal container freight service from Yiwu (China) to London via the New Eurasian Land Bridge and Channel Tunnel.
- (Ethiopia) January 10 – Addis Ababa–Djibouti Railway inaugurated throughout.
- (United Kingdom) (Italy) January 11 – Sale of English train operating company c2c by National Express to Trenitalia is agreed.
- (Serbia) January 14 – A Serbian Railways train decorated with Serbian propaganda intended to run from Belgrade to North Mitrovica is turned back at Raška by order of the Serbian Prime Minister, amidst claims that the authorities in Kosovo would prevent it from crossing their border.
- (China) January 26 – Opening of Harbin Metro Line 3.

=== February ===
- (United Kingdom) February 23 – High Speed 2 phase one gets parliamentary approval in the High Speed Rail (London - West Midlands) Act 2017, enabling construction to start in 2017.
- February 24
  - (United States) – The R Line and H Line extensions open as part of the FasTracks project in Denver, Colorado.
  - (Sweden) – withdrawal of SL X10 trainsets.
- February 26 – Saudi Railway Company opens the SAR Riyadh-Qurayyat Line to passengers from King Khalid International Airport, Riyadh, to the Al-Qassim Region in Saudi Arabia.

=== March ===
- (Taiwan) March 2 – Taoyuan International Airport MRT opened.
- (United States) March 25 – The Warm Springs station opens as part of the Bay Area Rapid Transit system in the San Francisco Bay Area, California.
- (Japan) – Tokyo Metro (former Eidan Electric Railway) phases out 01 series. Some trains are preserved or sent to Kumamoto Electric Railway.

=== April ===
- (Russia) April 3 – 2017 Saint Petersburg Metro bombing.
- (France) (Germany) April 28 – The Strasbourg tramway is extended over a new bridge across the Rhine to Kehl.

=== May ===
- (United States) May 12 – Opening of Detroit's QLine.
- (United Kingdom) May 19 – End of Slam-door era in the UK. The British Rail Class 121 is withdrawn from Aylesbury to Princes Risborough line after 57 years of service.
- (United States) May 22 – Opening of the MBTA Commuter Rail's Boston Landing station on the Framingham/Worcester Line in Massachusetts.
- (United States) May 26
  - 2017 Portland train attack.
  - Last Ringling Bros. and Barnum & Bailey Circus circus train runs.
- May 31 – Official opening of Mombasa–Nairobi Standard Gauge Railway in Kenya, 485 km (301 mi) of standard gauge track built with Chinese finance and expertise, cutting the Mombasa–Nairobi passenger journey time to 4½ hours, compared to 12 hours on the previous line.

=== June ===
- (China) June 16 – Harbin Metro Line 3 opened one infill station.
- June 18 – Tuas West extension, a 7.5-kilometre (4.7 mi) extension of the East–West MRT line in Singapore, opens.
- (Belgium) June 20 – June 2017 Brussels attack.
- (United States) June 29 – Sonoma–Marin Area Rail Transit begins preview service.

=== July ===
- (France) July 2 – Completion of LGV Sud Europe Atlantique from Tours to Bordeaux and of LGV Bretagne-Pays de la Loire from Le Mans to Rennes with consequent major reshaping of Transport express régional services.
- (Sweden) July 10 – Opening of Stockholm City Line.
- July 17 – Full opening of MRT Sungai Buloh-Kajang Line, from Semantan to Kajang. This includes Malaysia's second subway line, after the Kelana Jaya Line.

=== August ===
- (United Kingdom) August 20 – South Western franchise (including Island Line) passenger train operating company franchise in England, previously operated by South West Trains, passes to South Western Railway, a joint venture between FirstGroup (70%) and MTR Corporation of Hong Kong (30%).
- (India) August 23 – Auraiya train derailment.
- (United States) August 25 – Opening of Sonoma–Marin Area Rail Transit (SMART) commuter system in the North Bay area of San Francisco between northern Santa Rosa and downtown San Rafael, California.

=== September ===
- (United Kingdom) September 15 – Parsons Green bombing.
- (Spain) September 21 – Granada Metro opens to passenger service.
- (Denmark) September 23 – The grand opening of the Aarhus Letbane is cancelled several hours prior to the event due to missing security clearances from the Danish Transport Authority.
- (Taiwan) September 26 – Kaohsiung Circular Line (First Section) completed.

=== October ===
- (Singapore) October 21 – Downtown MRT line Phase 3 opened.
- (Azerbaijan) (Georgia (country)) (Turkey) October 30 – Baku–Tbilisi–Kars railway is inaugurated.

=== November ===
- (Russia) November 1 – Russian Railway Museum is opened to the public adjacent to Baltiysky railway station in Saint Petersburg.
- (Finland) November 18 – Länsimetro extension to Helsinki Metro is opened.
- (India) November 28 – First section (30 km) of Hyderabad Metro inaugurated.

=== December ===
- (Malaysia) December 4 – After being suspended for 4 years since 2013 due to technical problems, the Melaka Monorail service resumes.
- (Germany) December 10 – Opening of Nuremberg–Erfurt high-speed railway. Berlin-Munich corridor is completed.
- December 14 – Perpignan crash: A local train crashes into a school bus at a level crossing near Millas in the arrondissement of Perpignan in France, killing four pupils on the bus.
- (Switzerland) December 15 – Stoosbahn, the world's steepest mass transit funicular, officially opens, connecting Schlattli with Stoos.
- (Canada) December 17 – Opening of the Toronto subway Line 1 Yonge–University extension to Vaughan, Ontario.
- (United States) December 18 – 2017 Washington train derailment: Amtrak Cascades passenger train 501 derails near DuPont, Washington, on its inaugural southbound run on the Point Defiance Bypass with three fatalities.
- (Indonesia) December 26 – Soekarno–Hatta Airport Rail Link in Jakarta started operations.

=== Unknown date ===
- (Denmark) – Extension of DSB electrification to Esbjerg was expected to open.
- (Greece) – The new Tithorea–Leianokladi line, replacing the route via Bralos was expected to open.
- – China re-launches 350 km/h train operations after 6 year break, now with standard-class Fuxing trainsets.

== Deaths ==
- (United Kingdom) August 28 – Steven Marshall, chief executive of Railtrack (born 1957).
- (United States) December 16 – E. Hunter Harrison, president of Illinois Central Railroad 1993-1998, president of Canadian National Railway 2003-2009, president and CEO of Canadian Pacific Railway 2012-2017 and CEO of CSX Transportation in 2017 (born 1944).
