= Line 2 (Harbin Metro) =

Harbin Metro line

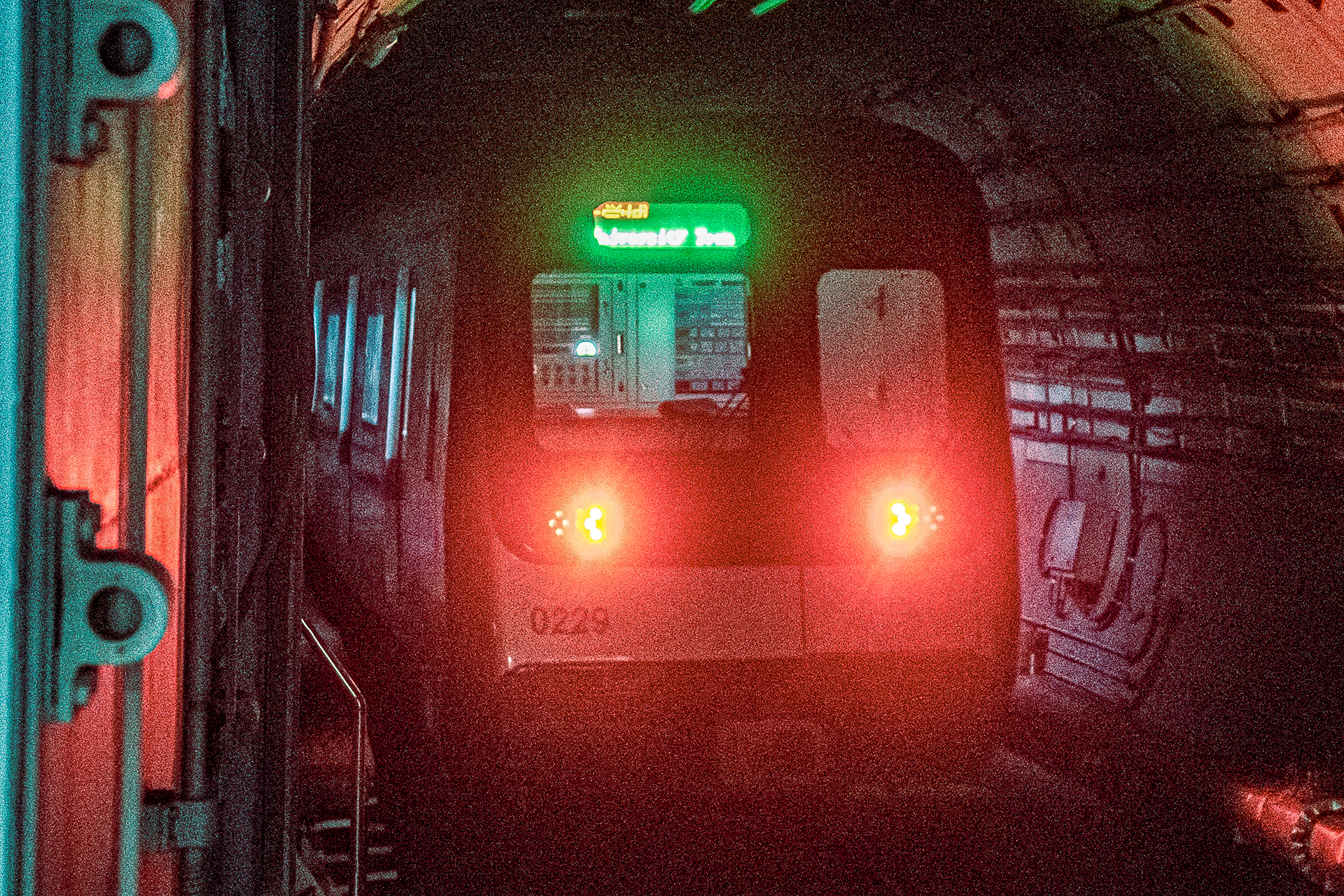
- A Harbin Metro Line 2 train

Overview
- Status: Operational
- Owner: Harbin Government
- Locale: Harbin, Heilongjiang, China
- Stations: Phase I: 19

Service
- Type: Rapid transit
- System: Harbin Metro
- Services: 1
- Operator: Harbin Metro Group Corporation

History
- Planned opening: Phase I: 19 September 2021; 5 years ago

Technical
- Line length: Phase I: 28.7 km (17.83 mi)
- Number of tracks: 2
- Character: Underground
- Track gauge: 1,435 mm (4 ft 8 1/2 in)
Route map
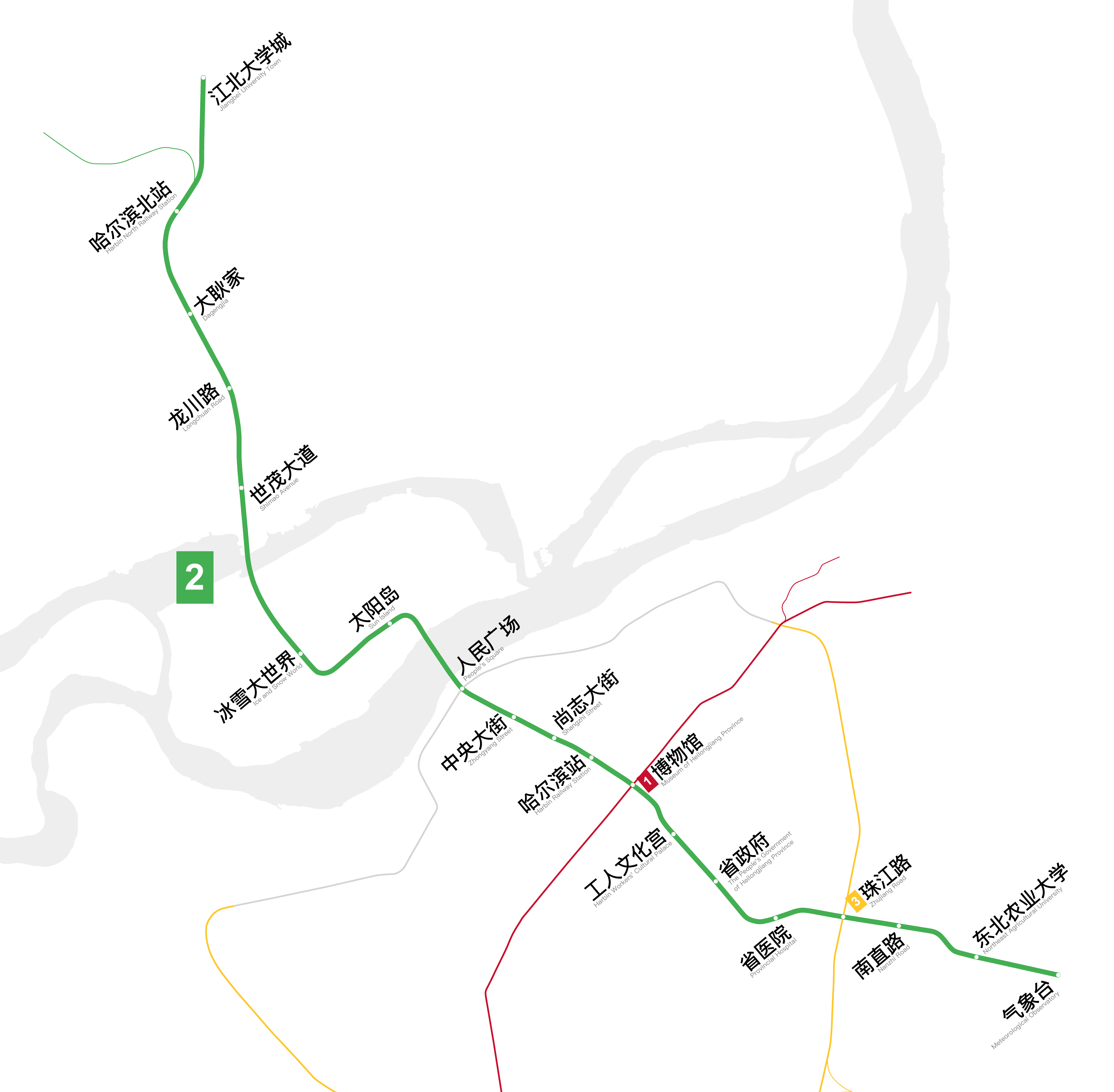

Line 2 of the Harbin Metro (Chinese: 哈尔滨地铁二号线; pinyin: Hārbīn Dìtiě Èr Hào Xiàn) is a rapid transit line in Harbin, running from Jiangbei University Town to Meteorological Observatory. The line is 28.7 km (17.8 mi) long with 19 stations, all of which are underground. It opened on 19 September 2021.

The termini of Line 2, Jiangbei University Town and Meteorological Observatory, became the northernmost and easternmost metro stations in China since operation.

== Stations ==
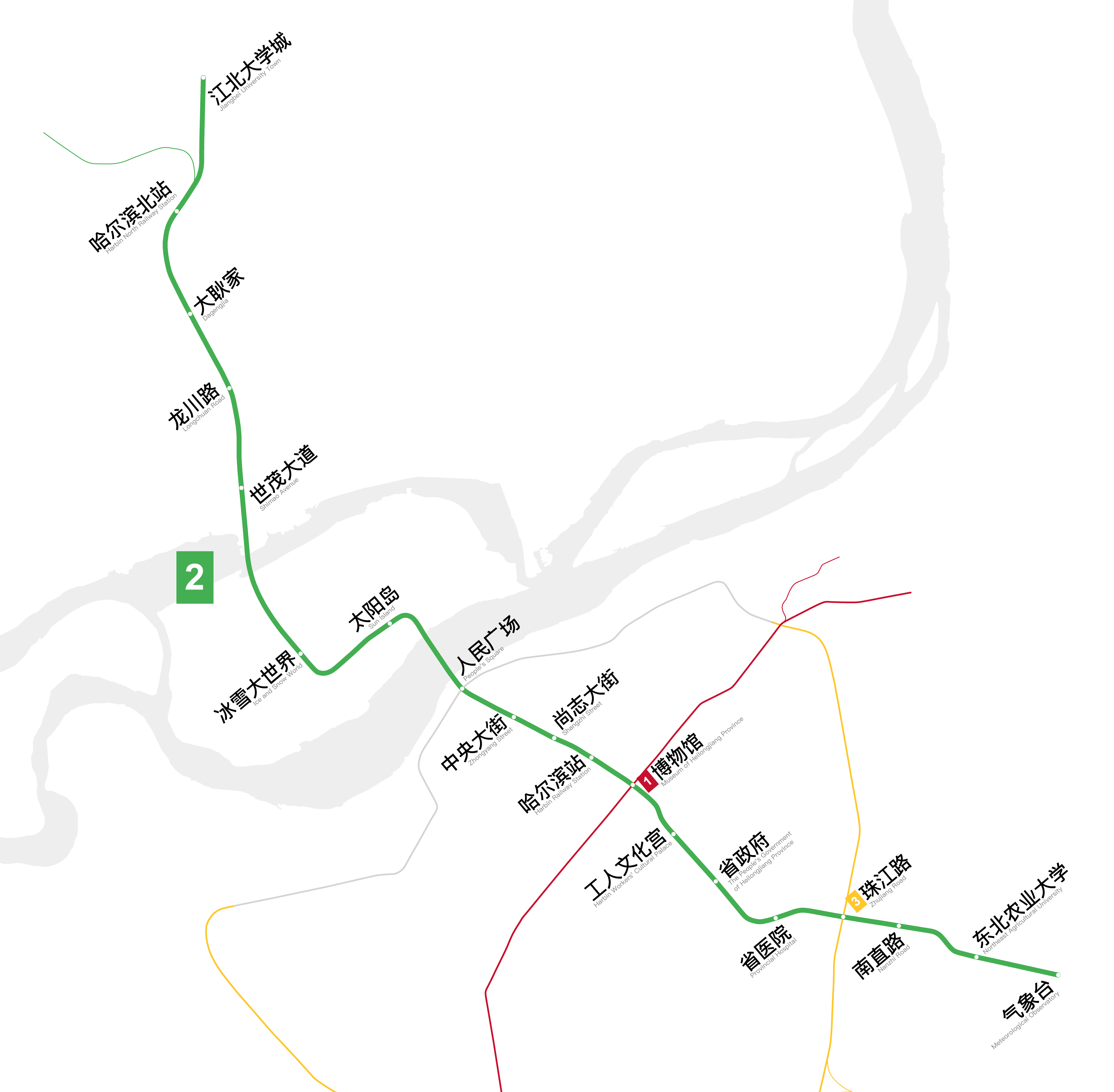

| Station name | | Connections | Distance km | Location |
| English | Chinese | Connections | Distance km | Location |
|---|---|---|---|---|
| Jiangbei University Town | 江北大学城 | | | Hulan |
| Harbin North Railway Station | 哈尔滨北站 | HTB | | Hulan |
| Dagengjia | 大耿家 | | | Songbei |
| Longchuan Road | 龙川路 | | | Songbei |
| Shimao Avenue | 世茂大道 | | | Songbei |
| Ice and Snow World | 冰雪大世界 | | | Songbei |
| Sun Island | 太阳岛 | | | Songbei |
| People's Square | 人民广场 | 3 | | Daoli |
| Zhongyang Street | 中央大街 | | | Daoli |
| Shangzhi Street | 尚志大街 | | | Daoli |
| Harbin Railway Station | 哈尔滨站 | HBB | | Nangang |
| Museum of Heilongjiang Province | 博物馆 | 1 | | Nangang |
| Workers' Cultural Palace | 工人文化宫 | | | Nangang |
| The People's Government of Heilongjiang Province | 省政府 | | | Xiangfang |
| Provincial Hospital | 省医院 | | | Xiangfang |
| Zhujiang Road | 珠江路 | 3 | | Xiangfang |
| Nanzhi Road | 南直路 | | | Xiangfang |
| Northeast Agricultural University | 农业大学 | | | Xiangfang |
| Meteorological Observatory | 气象台 | | | Xiangfang |
