= Taipingqiao station =

Taipingqiao station may refer to:

- Taipingqiao station (Beijing Subway), a station on Line 19 of the Beijing Subway
- Taipingqiao station (Harbin Metro), a station on Line 1 and Line 3 of Harbin Metro
