= Line 3 (Harbin Metro) =

Harbin Metro line

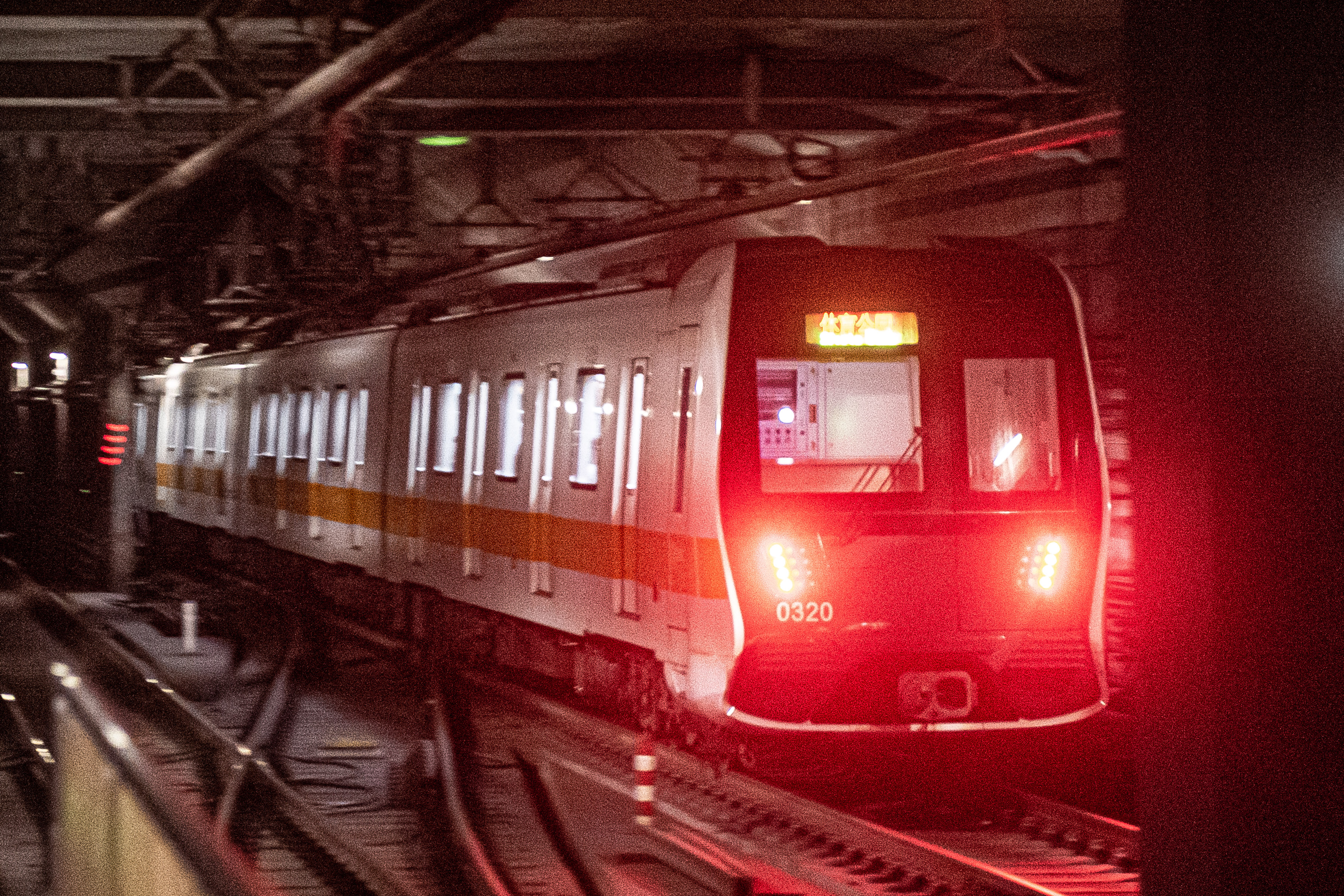
- A Harbin Metro Line 3 train

Overview
- Status: Operational
- Owner: Harbin Government
- Locale: Harbin, Heilongjiang, China
- Stations: 36 (full line)

Service
- Type: Rapid transit
- System: Harbin Metro
- Services: 1
- Operator(s): Harbin Metro Group Corporation

History
- Planned opening: Phase II (Northwest): 2023 & 2024
- Opened: Phase I: 26 January 2017; 8 years ago Phase II (Southeast): 26 November 2021; 3 years ago

Technical
- Line length: 37.6 km (23.4 mi) (full line)
- Number of tracks: 2
- Character: Underground
- Track gauge: 1,435 mm (4 ft 8 1/2 in)
Route map
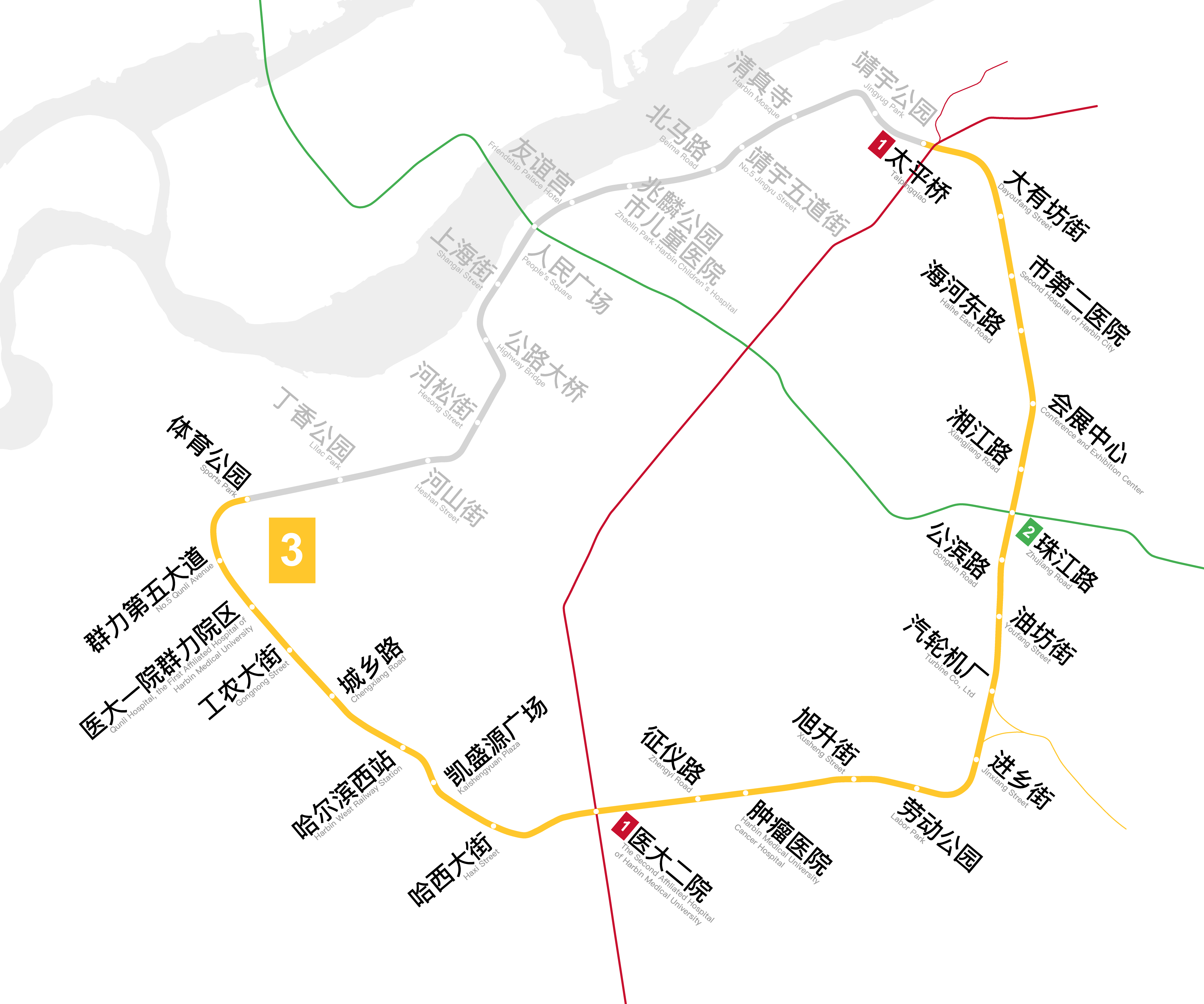

Line 3 of the Harbin Metro (Chinese: 哈尔滨地铁三号线; pinyin: Hārbīn Dìtiě Sān Hào Xiàn) is a rapid transit ring line in Harbin.

== History ==
=== Phase 1 ===
The first phase of the line, from Harbin West Railway Station to The Second Affiliated Hospital of Harbin Medical University, commenced operations on 26 January 2017. It is 5.45 km long with 5 stations, all of which are underground.

Harbindajie station opened as an infill station on June 16, 2017. Harbindajie station renamed to Kaishengyuan Plaza station on March 20, 2019.

=== Phase 2 (initial section) ===
The section from The Second Affiliated Hospital of Harbin Medical University to Taipingqiao, and the section from Harbin West Railway Station to Sports Park opened on November 26, 2021.

=== Phase 2 (remaining section) ===
The remaining section, comprising 9 stations, opened on 25 November 2024.

=== Opening timeline ===
Segment	Commencement	Length	Station(s)	Name
Harbin West Railway Station — The Second Affiliated Hospital of Harbin Medical University	26 January 2017	5.45 km (3.39 mi)	3	Phase 1
Kaishengyuan Plaza (Note: Known as Harbindajie station (哈尔滨大街) before March 20, 2019.)	16 June 2017	infill station	1	Phase 1
The Second Affiliated Hospital of Harbin Medical University — Taipingqiao	26 November 2021	19.19 km (11.92 mi)	15	Phase 2 (southeast section)
Harbin West Railway Station — Sports Park	26 November 2021	19.19 km (11.92 mi)	5	Phase 2 (southeast section)
Taipingqiao — Chinese-baroque Block	29 September 2023	3.4 km (2.11 mi)	3	Phase 2 (northwest section)
Chinese-baroque Block — Beima Road	26 December 2023	1.0 km (0.62 mi)	1	Phase 2 (northwest section)
Beima Road — Sports Park	25 November 2024	8.6 km (5.34 mi)	9	Phase 2 (northwest section)

== Stations ==

Legend

- Stations in operation
- Under construction, opening in 2023 & 2024

Station name		Connections	Distance km	Location
English	Chinese	Connections	Distance km	Location
Sports Park	体育公园			Daoli
No.5 Qunli Avenue	群力第五大道			Daoli
Qunli Hospital, the First Affiliated Hospital of Harbin Medical University	医大一院群力院区			Daoli
Gongnong Street	工农大街			Daoli
Chengxiang Road	城乡路			Daoli
Harbin West Railway Station	哈尔滨西站	VAB		Nangang
Kaishengyuan Plaza	凯盛源广场			Nangang
Haxi Street	哈西大街			Nangang
The Second Affiliated Hospital of Harbin Medical University	医大二院	1		Nangang
Zhengyi Road	征仪路			Nangang
Harbin Medical University Cancer Hospital	肿瘤医院			Nangang
Xusheng Street	旭升街			Xiangfang
Labor Park	劳动公园			Xiangfang
Jinxiang Street	进乡街			Xiangfang
Turbine Co., Ltd	汽轮机厂			Xiangfang
Youfang Street	油坊街			Xiangfang
Gongbin Road	公滨路			Xiangfang
Zhujiang Road	珠江路	2		Xiangfang
Xiangjiang Road	湘江路			Nangang
Conference and Exhibition Center	会展中心			Nangang
Haihe East Road	海河东路			Nangang
Second Hospital of Harbin City	市第二医院			Daowai
Dayoufang Street	大有坊街			Daowai
Taipingqiao	太平桥	1		Daowai
Jingyu Park	靖宇公园			Daowai
Harbin Mosque	清真寺			Daowai
Chinese-baroque Block	中华巴洛克街区			Daowai
Beima Road	北马路			Daowai
Zhaolin Park · Harbin Children's Hospital	兆麟公园·市儿童医院			Daoli
Friendship Palace Hotel	友谊宫			Daoli
People's Square	人民广场	2		Daoli
Shanghai Street	上海街			Daoli
Highway Bridge	公路大桥			Daoli
Hesong Street	河松街			Daoli
Heshan Street	河山街			Daoli
Lilac Park	丁香公园			Daoli

== Rolling stock ==
Services on the line are provided by six-car Type B trains, which have a total capacity of 1440. These trains are the same as those which run on Line 1.
