= Yongyuan =

Yongyuan may refer to:

- Yongyuan Town (永源镇), town in Daowai District, Harbin, Heilongjiang, China

== Historical eras ==
- Yongyuan (永元, 89–105), era name used by Emperor He of Han
- Yongyuan (永元, 499–501), era name used by Xiao Baojuan, emperor of Southern Qi
