= Jile Temple =

Buddhist temple in Harbin, China

- 极乐寺
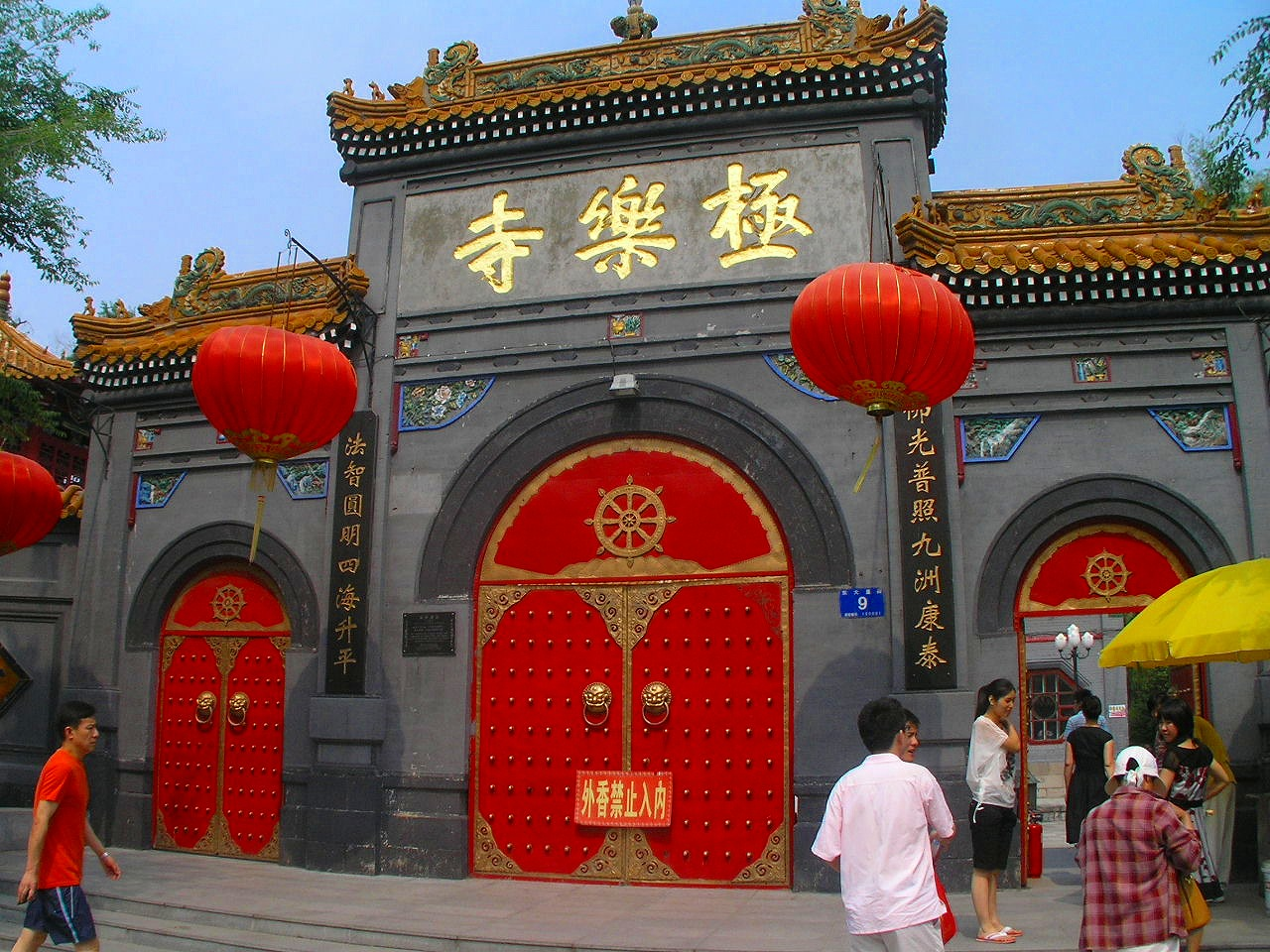
- Jile Temple

- Location within Heilongjiang

Religion
- Affiliation: Buddhism
- Sect: Chan Buddhism

Location
- Location: Harbin, Heilongjiang, China
- Interactive map of Jile Temple
- Coordinates: 45°46′35″N 126°39′52″E

Architecture
- Style: Chinese architecture
- Established: 1921

Jile Temple (simplified Chinese: 极乐寺; traditional Chinese: 極樂寺; pinyin: Jílè Sì; lit. 'Temple of Bliss') of Harbin, China, is the largest Buddhist building complex in Heilongjiang and was constructed between 1921 and 1924. The grounds cover 53,500 square metres and the buildings cover 5,186 square metres. It is located at No. 5 East Dazhi Street, Nangang Dist. in Harbin. The temple was badly damaged in August 1966, during the Cultural Revolution, and later rebuilt.
