= Harbin No 3 High School =

High School in Heilongjiang, China

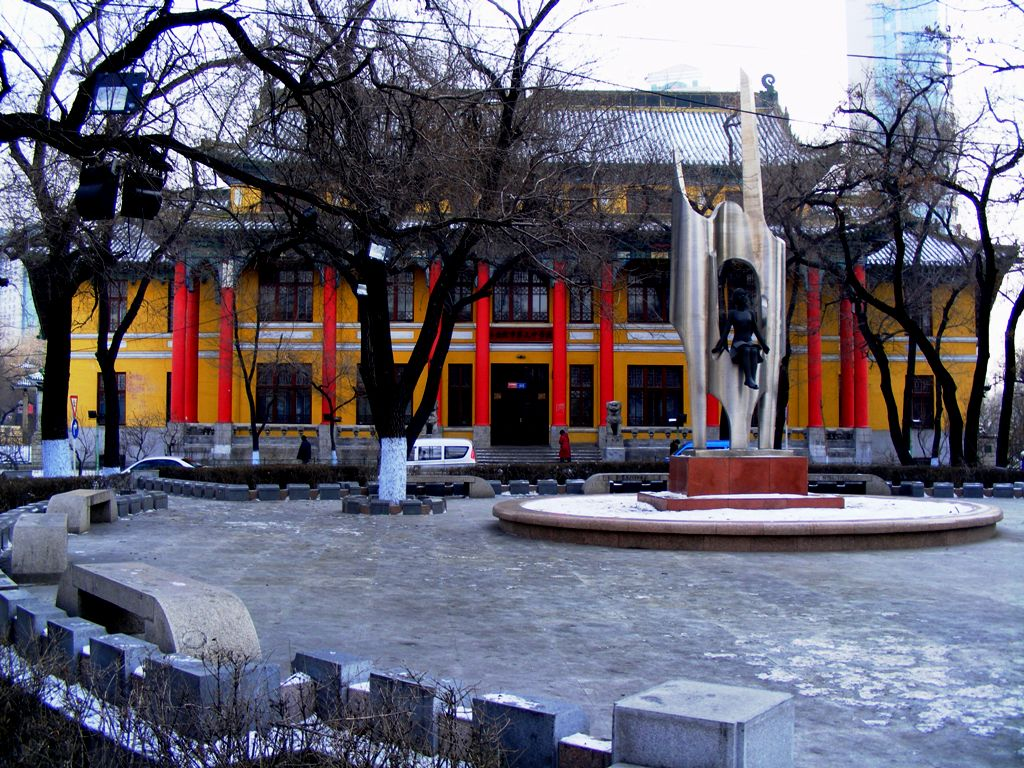
Historical school yard

Harbin No.3 High School (Chinese: 哈尔滨市第三中学) is a high school in Harbin, Heilongjiang Province.

The school has two campuses. One is located in the center of Harbin, Nangang District, and the other one is located in the Qunli subdistrict of Daoli District. Admission is given based on test results, selecting the top of 1% students.

The school has 92 classes (3 levels in total) and about 3,500 students. Its university admission rate is approximately 95%.

In 2008, Harbin No.3 High School set up a Euro-American Cultural Exchange Center, using the Global Assessment Certificate (GAC), and the primary program of American College Test (ACT) Education Solutions.
