= Daxing Subdistrict, Harbin =

Daxing Subdistrict 大兴街道
- Subdistrict
- Location in Heilongjiang Daxing Subdistrict (China)
- Coordinates: 45.7895°N 126.6459°E
- Country: People's Republic of China
- Province: Heilongjiang
- Prefecture-level city: Harbin
- District: Daowai District
- Time zone: UTC+8 (China Standard)

Daxing Subdistrict (simplified Chinese: 大兴街道; traditional Chinese: 大興街道; pinyin: Dàxīng Jiēdào) is a subdistrict in Daowai District, Harbin, Heilongjiang, China. As of 2018, it has 5 residential communities under its administration.

== See also ==
- List of township-level divisions of Heilongjiang
