= Jiaxing Tram =

Tram service in Jiaxing, China

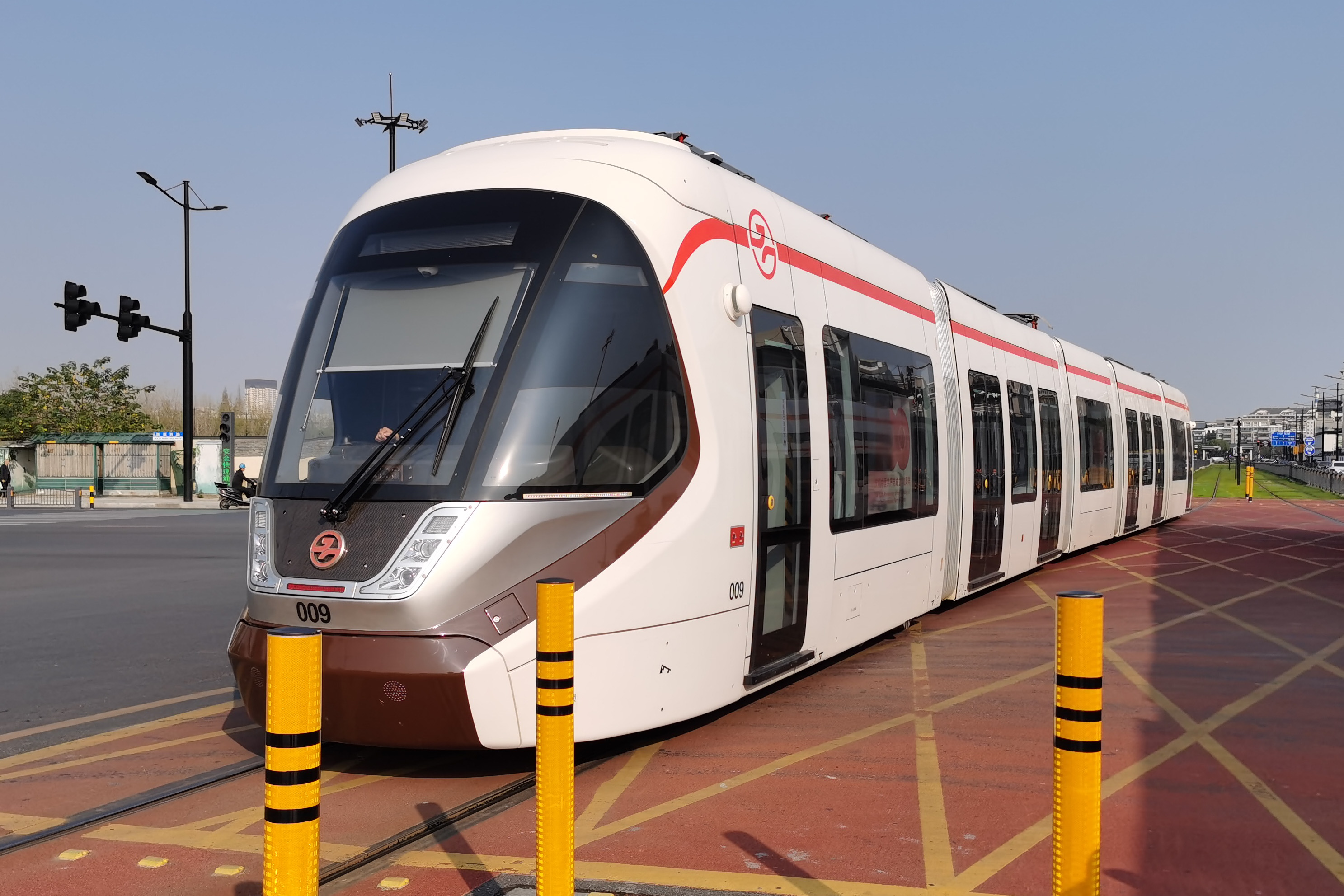
- Jiaxing Tram in October 2021

Overview
- Area served: Jiaxing, Zhejiang, China
- Transit type: Tram
- Number of lines: 1
- Number of stations: 16

Operation
- Began operation: June 25, 2021; 5 years ago
- Operator: Shanghai Keolis
- Number of vehicles: 20

Technical
- System length: 13.8 km (8.6 mi)

Jiaxing Tram (Chinese: 嘉兴有轨电车) is a tram system in Jiaxing, Zhejiang Province, China. There are seven lines planned for construction, which will span a length of about 98 kilometres (61 mi).

== History ==

Jiaxing first disclosed the rail plan in 2015. On 16 September 2019, the Jiaxing Municipal People's Government approved the construction plan of the tram for 2019–2023. The plan was also approved by the Zhejiang Provincial Development and Reform Commission on 9 December 2019, and the preliminary design of the first phase of the project was approved on 17 April 2020 by the same commission.

On 28 December 2019, the tram started construction at the hub of the Jiaxing railway station, and construction of the whole line of the first phase began in May 2020.

On 5 November 2020, the first box substation of the first phase was moved to basis, and the leveling, installation, and connection of the equipment was completed. On the 14th of the same month, the first set of turnouts began to be laid. On the 17th, the platform design plan was released. On the afternoon of 11 December, the beam and slab erection of the first bridge of the T1 line was completed. This marked that the rail laying construction of the first phase had entered a comprehensive stage. In the same month, the Operations Control Center (OCC) completed the structural capping. In January 2021, the subgrade pile foundation of the first phase was completed.

The first phase, a 10.6 kilometres (6.6 mi) long stretch from Jiaxing South railway station to Fanggong Road Binhe Road stop (Chinese: 纺工路滨河路站), opened on 25 June 2021. From opening until 7 October 2021, passengers could travel for free. A one-station extension (0.6 kilometres (0.37 mi)) to Jiaxing railway station was opened on 15 January 2022. It was further extended for four stations (2.6 kilometres (1.6 mi)) to East Zhongshan Road Anle Road (CIFI Plaza) on 25 June 2022.
