= Harbin Metro =

Rapid transit system in Harbin, China

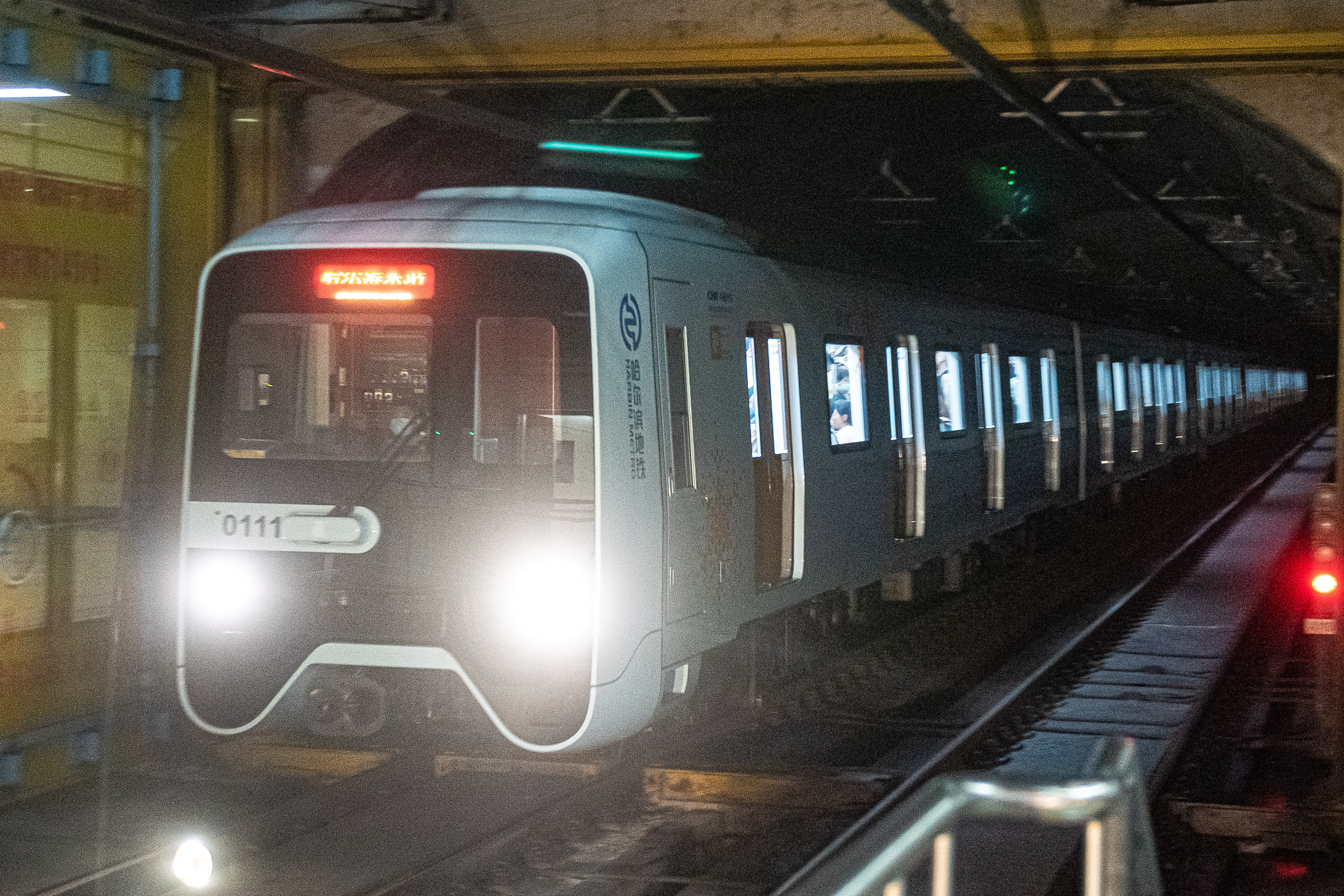

Overview
- Owner: Harbin Municipal People's Government
- Locale: Harbin
- Transit type: Rapid transit
- Number of lines: 3
- Line number: 1 2 3
- Number of stations: 78
- Website: www.harbin-metro.com

Operation
- Began operation: 26 September 2013; 13 years ago

Technical
- System length: 91.57 km (56.90 mi)
- Track gauge: 1,435 mm (4 ft 8 1/2 in) standard gauge
System map
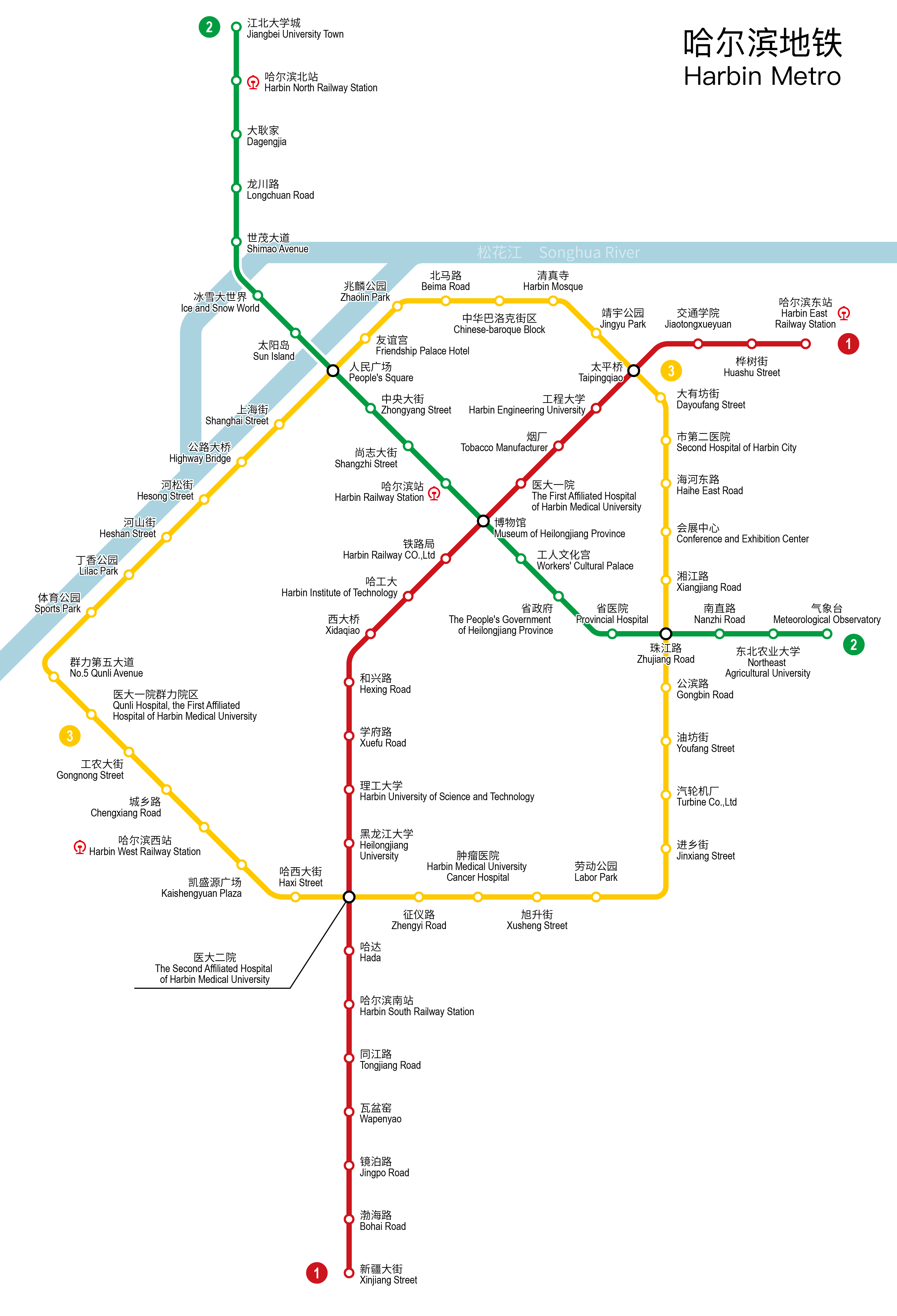

Harbin Metro
- Simplified Chinese: 哈尔滨地铁
- Traditional Chinese: 哈爾濱地鐵
Transcriptions
Standard Mandarin
- Hanyu Pinyin: Hā'ěrbīn Dìtiě

The Harbin Metro is the rapid transit system of Harbin, the provincial capital of Heilongjiang Province in northeastern China. The system began operation on 26 September 2013 with the opening of Line 1. It has three lines.

== Hours and fares ==
Trains operate from 5:30 AM to 10:30 PM daily. Fares are distance-based, starting at ¥2 for up to 6 km and increasing in tiers: ¥3 (up to 10 km), ¥4 (14 km), ¥5 (21 km), ¥6 (28 km), with an additional ¥1 per 10 km beyond 29 km (as of 2024). Fare payments are generally made via mobile apps like Alipay or WeChat.

== Lines in operation ==
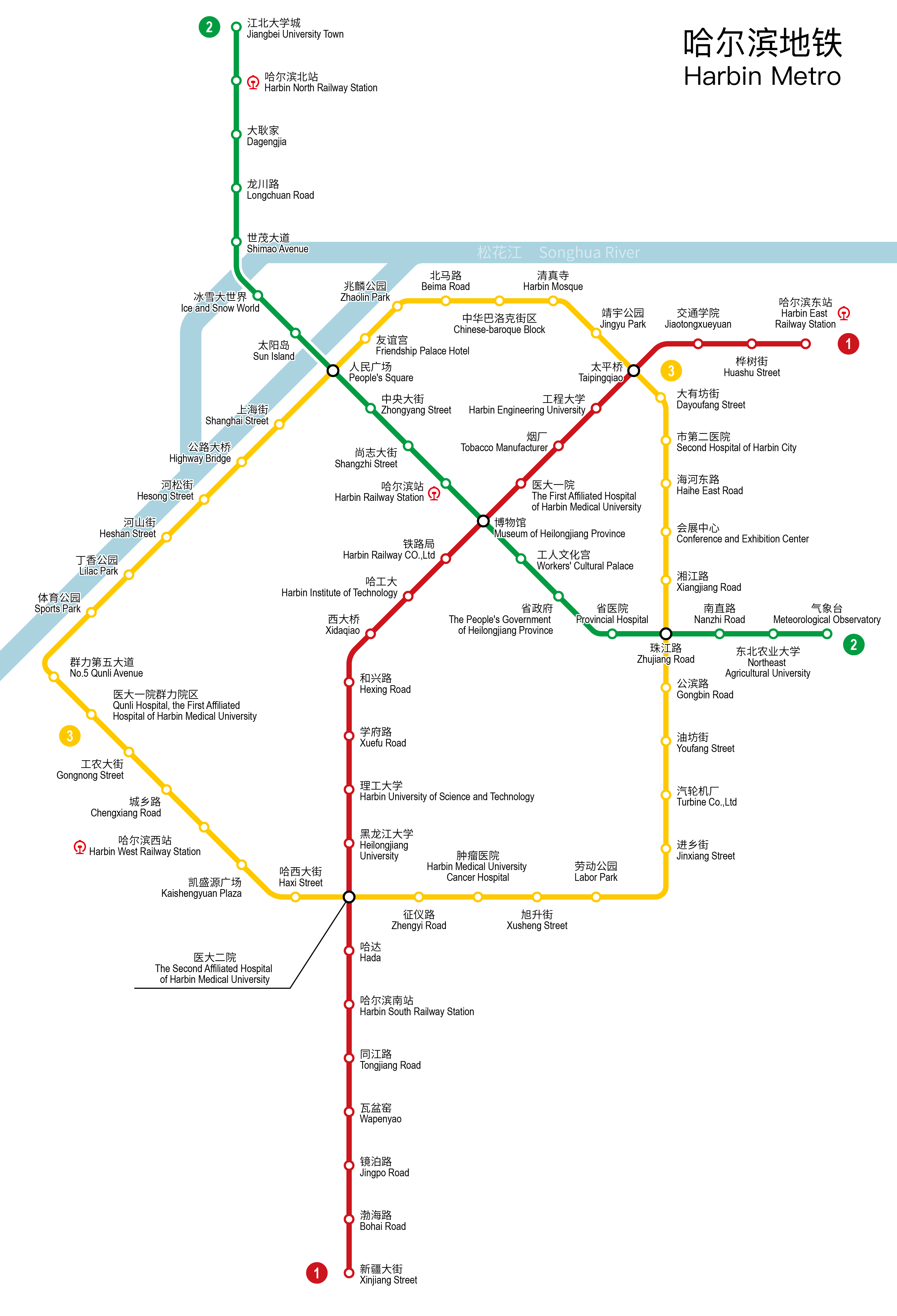
Harbin Metro

Line	Terminals (District)		Commencement	Newest Extension	Length km	Stations
1	Harbin East Railway Station (Daowai)	Xinjiang Street (Pingfang)	September 26, 2013	April 10, 2019	26.27	23
2	Jiangbei University Town (Hulan)	Meteorological Observatory (Xiangfang)	September 19, 2021	—	28.19	19
3	Sports Park (Daoli)	Sports Park (Daoli)	January 26, 2017	November 25, 2024	37.6	36
Total					91.57	78

=== Line 1 ===
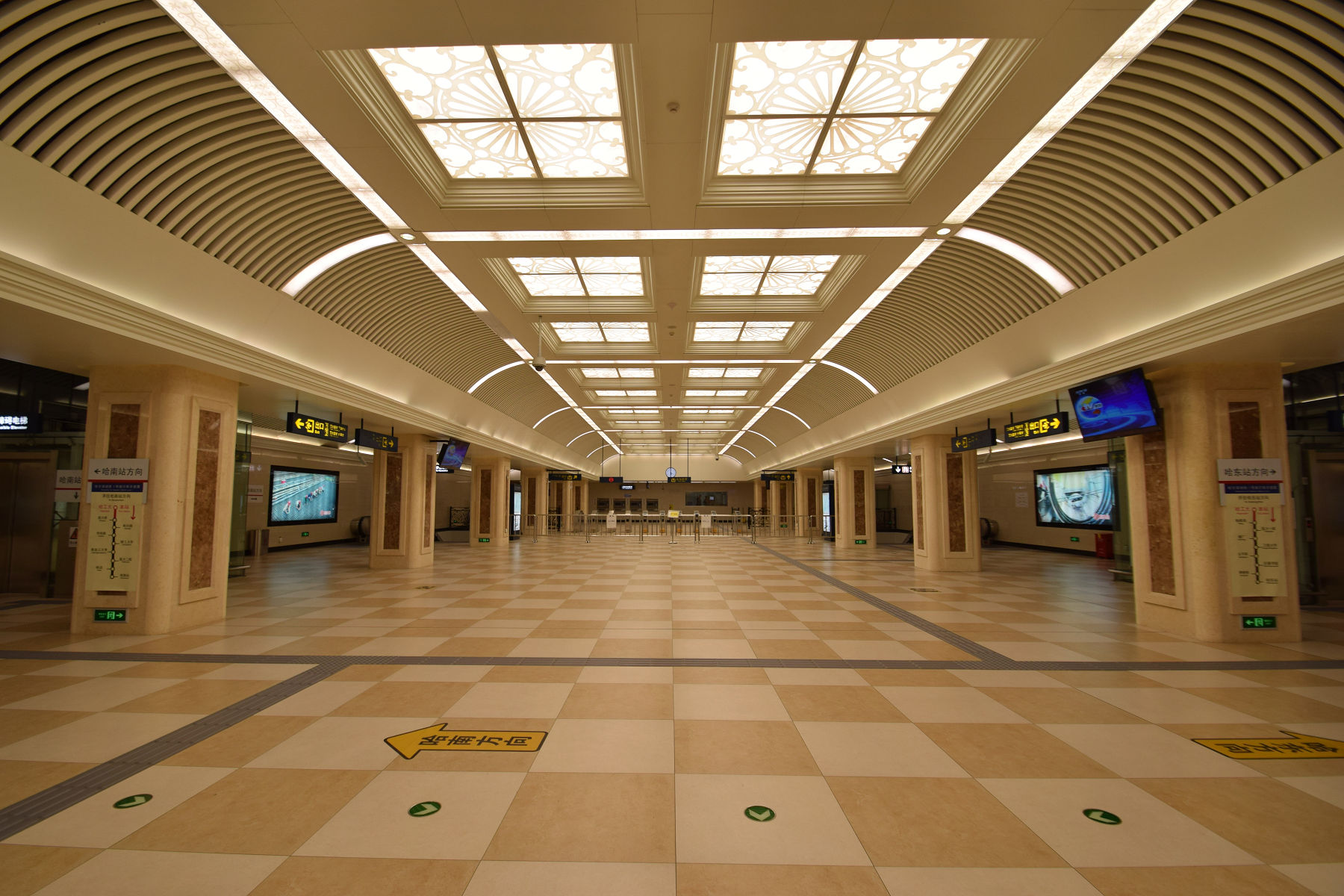
Harbin Institute of Technology station of Line 1 (Harbin Metro)

Line 1 is oriented along the east–west axis of the urban area of Harbin, from northeast to southwest.

=== Line 2 ===
Line 2 opened on 19 September 2021. It is 28.7 km in length with 19 stations.

=== Line 3 ===
Line 3 is a circular line around the urban area of Harbin. The first phase consisted of 5 stations and opened in 2017.

The section from The Second Affiliated Hospital of Harbin Medical University to Taipingqiao, and the section from Harbin West Railway Station to Sports Park opened on 26 November 2021. The circular line was completed on 27 November 2024.

== History ==
The Harbin Metro was approved by the State Council of the People's Republic of China in July 2005. The initial investment was estimated to cost US$643 million. The project was headed by the Harbin Municipal People's Government Metro Construction, which established a Track Traffic Construction Office led by the city's construction commission. In 2006, an official "Initiation Ceremony of Harbin Metro Trial Project" was held, signifying the actual implementation of Harbin Line 1 project. The builders made use of a 10.1 km air defense tunnel built in the 1970s as part of the "7381" civil air-defense project, which forms the part of Line 1 between Xidaqiao and Tobacco Manufacturer stations where both tracks run in one large tunnel with side platforms.

Construction on Line 1 began a second time on 29 September 2009 and was later halted before being resumed on 1 March 2010. In March 2011 the contract for traincars for first line was signed with Changchun Railway Vehicles co. ltd. The target date for opening of the first line, 17.47 km in length, with 18 stations was set to the end of 2012. Line 1 opened on 26 September 2013.

Line 2 construction began in December 2014, with the first phase opening on 19 September 2021, spanning 18.5 km with 16 stations. Line 3, a circular line, saw its southeast half-ring (19.19 km with 19 stations) open on 26 November 2021. The remaining northwest section opened on 26 November 2024, completing the 32.18 km loop with 28 stations.

== Future lines ==
On 18 April 2016, the official website of Harbin Metro Group released the "Announcement of Environmental Impact Assessment for the Second Phase of Harbin Urban Rail Transit Construction Plan (2017-2022)". The planned line length is about 85 km, including 65 stations. According to the updated second phase construction planning announced in July 2022 (2022-2027), only Lines 4 and 5 are planned. The length was shortened to 70.6 km with 54 stations. In July 2025, the Harbin rail transit network plan (2021-2035) was approved, confirming the inclusion of these lines.

Years	Lines	Section	Status	Length	Stations	Terminus
TBA	4	Phase 1	Under Planning	34.5 km	29	Qiansha - Minzu College
TBA	5	Phase 1	Under Planning	36.1 km	25	Dongsanhuan - Nanjing Road

== See also ==
- List of metro systems
- Urban rail transit in China
