= Taipingqiao station (Harbin Metro) =

Harbin Metro station

Taipingqiao 太平桥
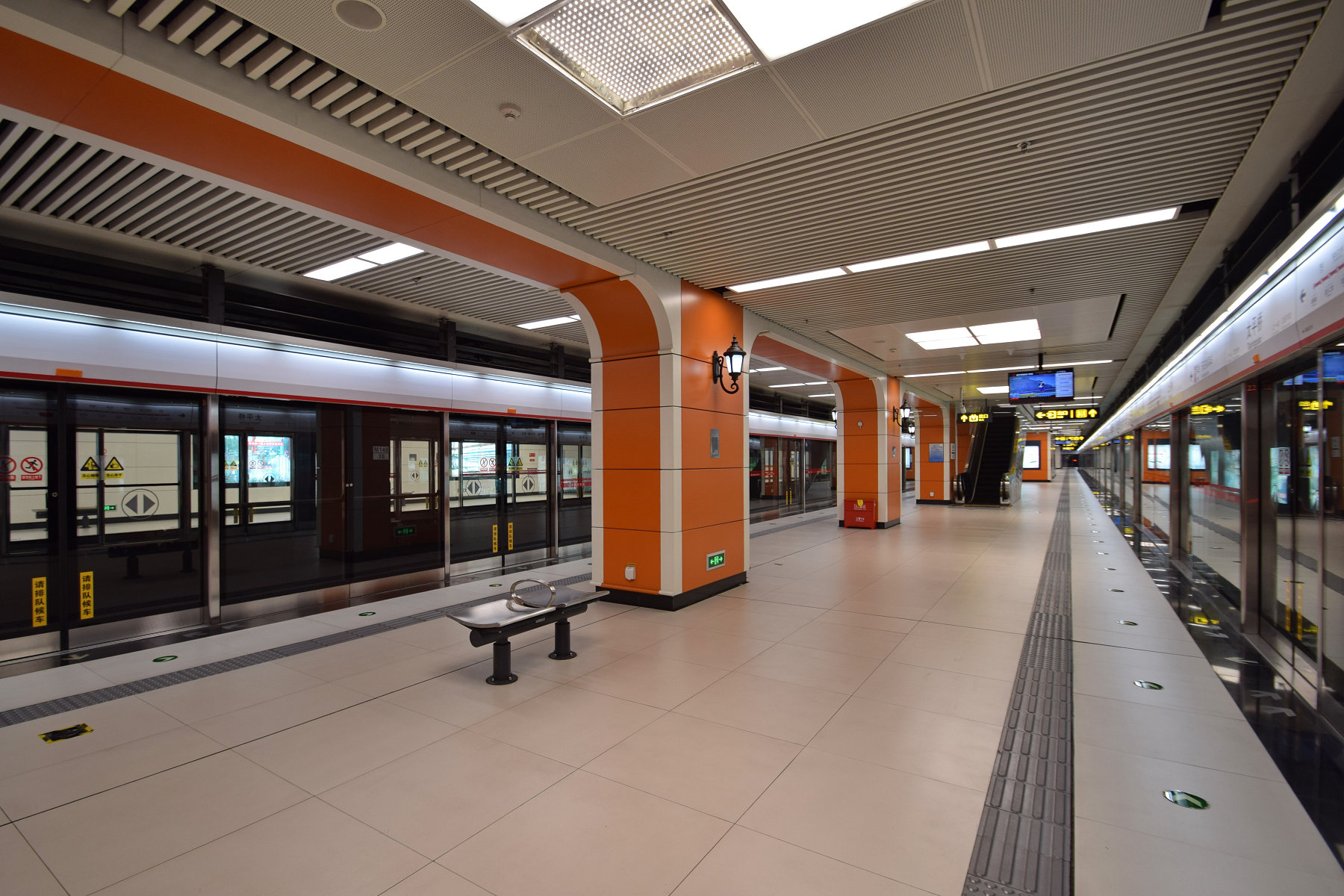
- Line 1 platform

General information
- Location: Nantong Street × Dongzhi Road × Tonghe Street; Daowai District, Harbin, Heilongjiang Province; China
- Coordinates: 45°46′54″N 126°40′17″E
- Lines: Line 1 Line 3

Construction
- Structure type: Underground

History
- Opened: September 26, 2013 (Line 1); November 26, 2021 (Line 3)

Services
Preceding station	Harbin Metro	Following station
Jiaotongxueyuan towards Harbin East Railway Station	Line 1	Harbin Engineering University towards Xinjiang Street
Dayoufang Street Clockwise	Line 3	Jingyu Park Anticlockwise
Location

Taipingqiao station (simplified Chinese: 太平桥站; traditional Chinese: 太平橋站; pinyin: Tàipíngqiáo Zhàn) is a metro station on Line 1 and Line 3 of the Harbin Metro. The station for Line 1 opened on September 26, 2013, and the station for Line 3 opened on November 26, 2021.
