= Nangang, Harbin =

Nangang 南岗区
- District
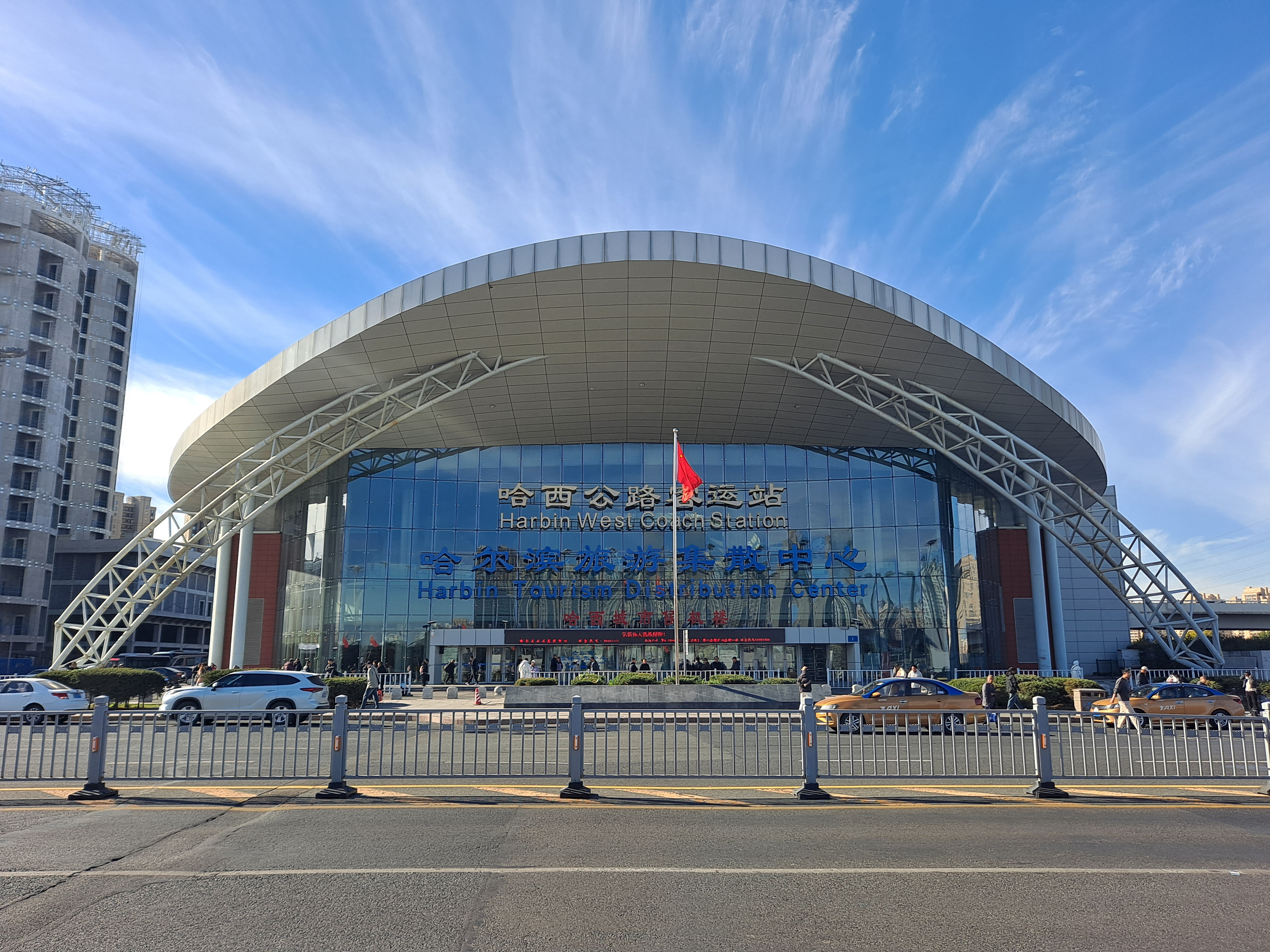
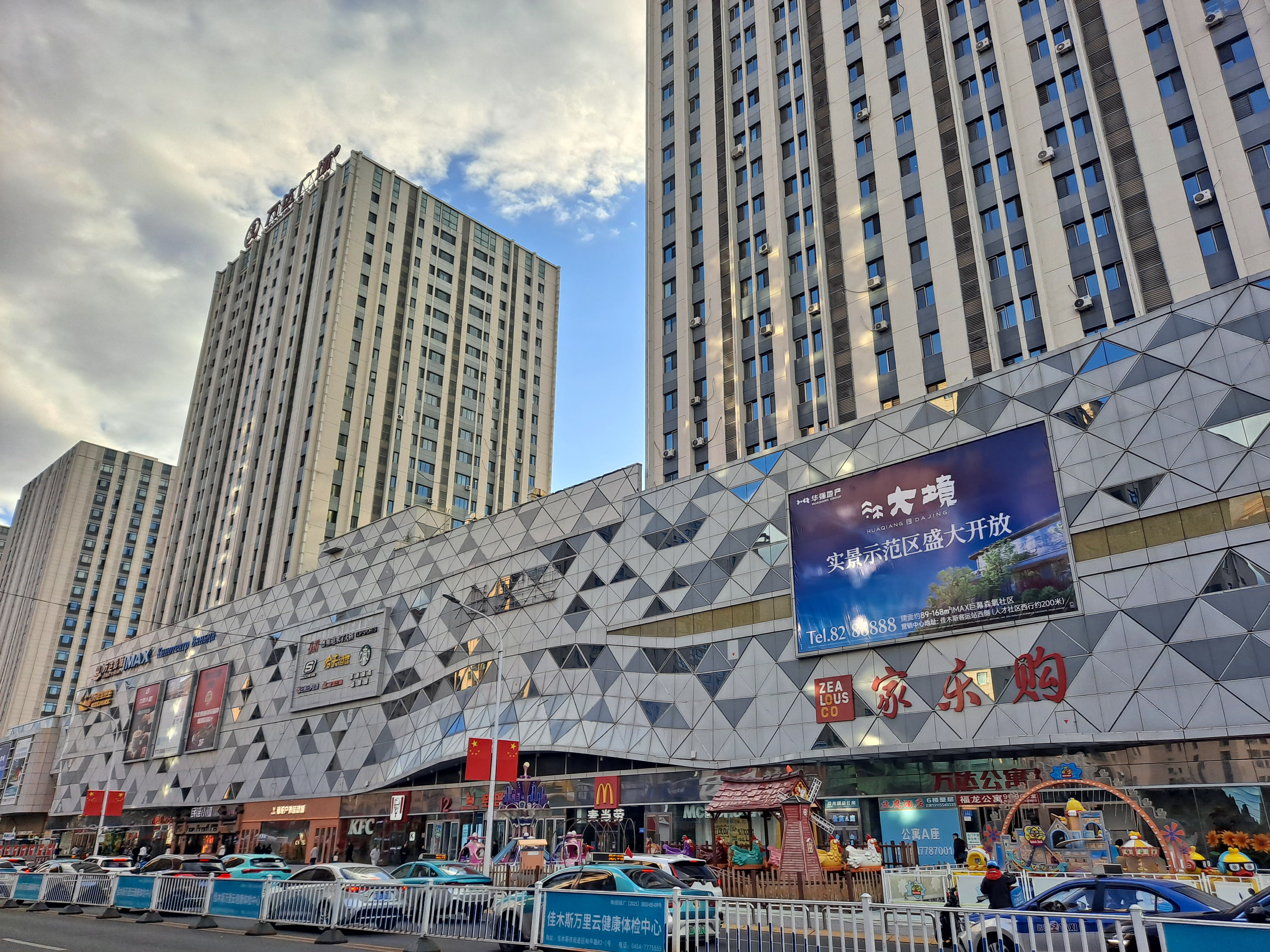
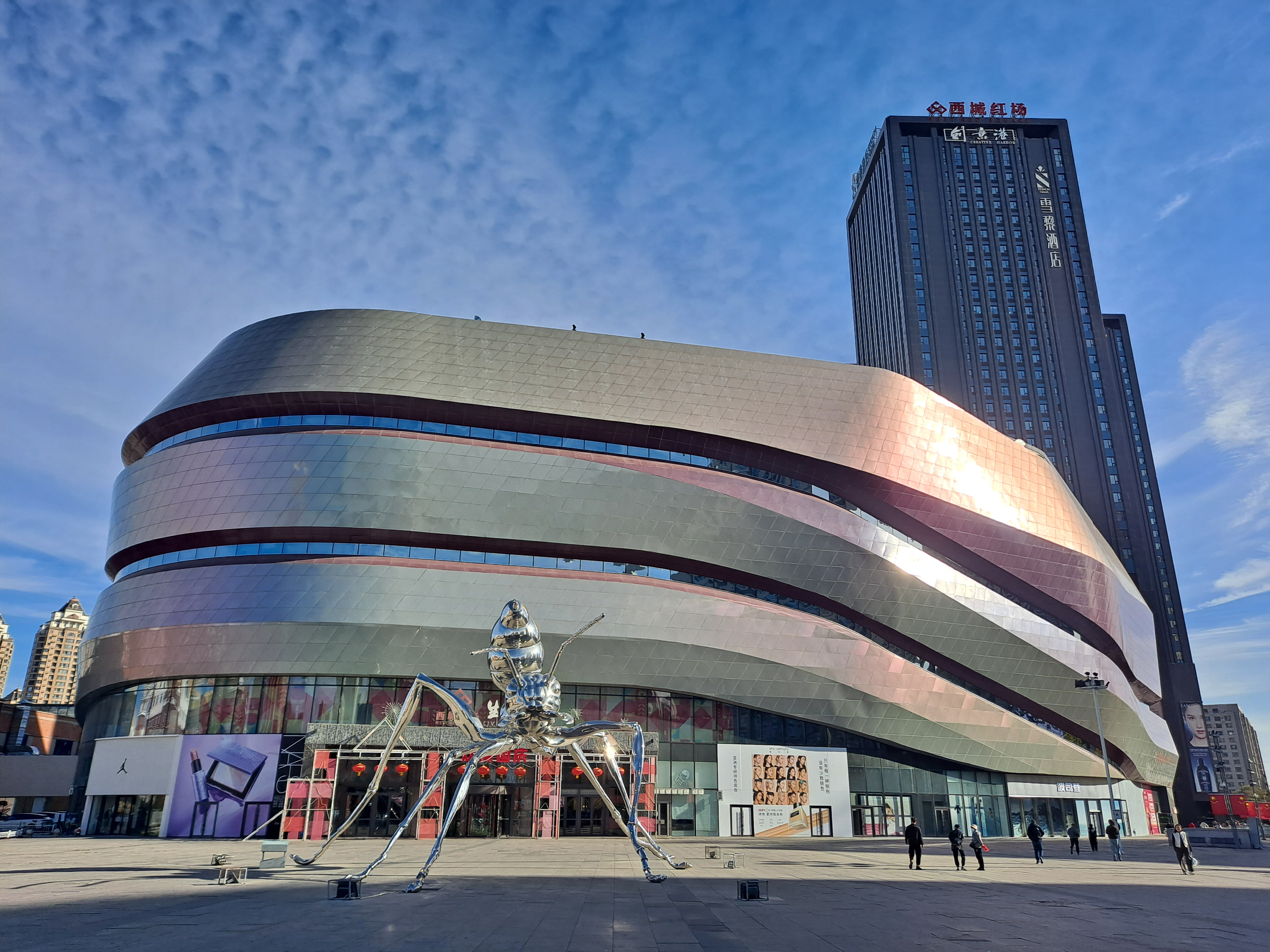
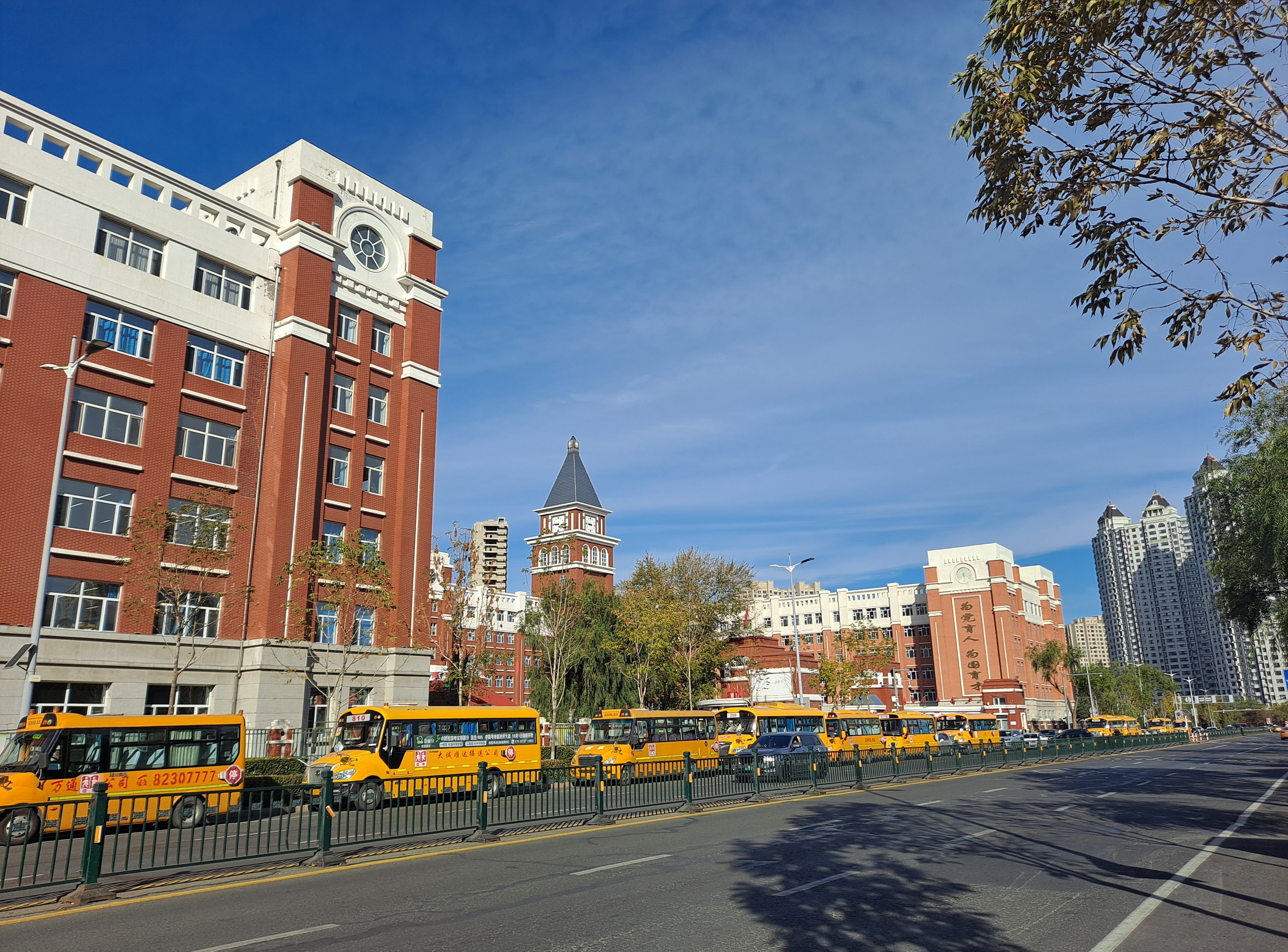
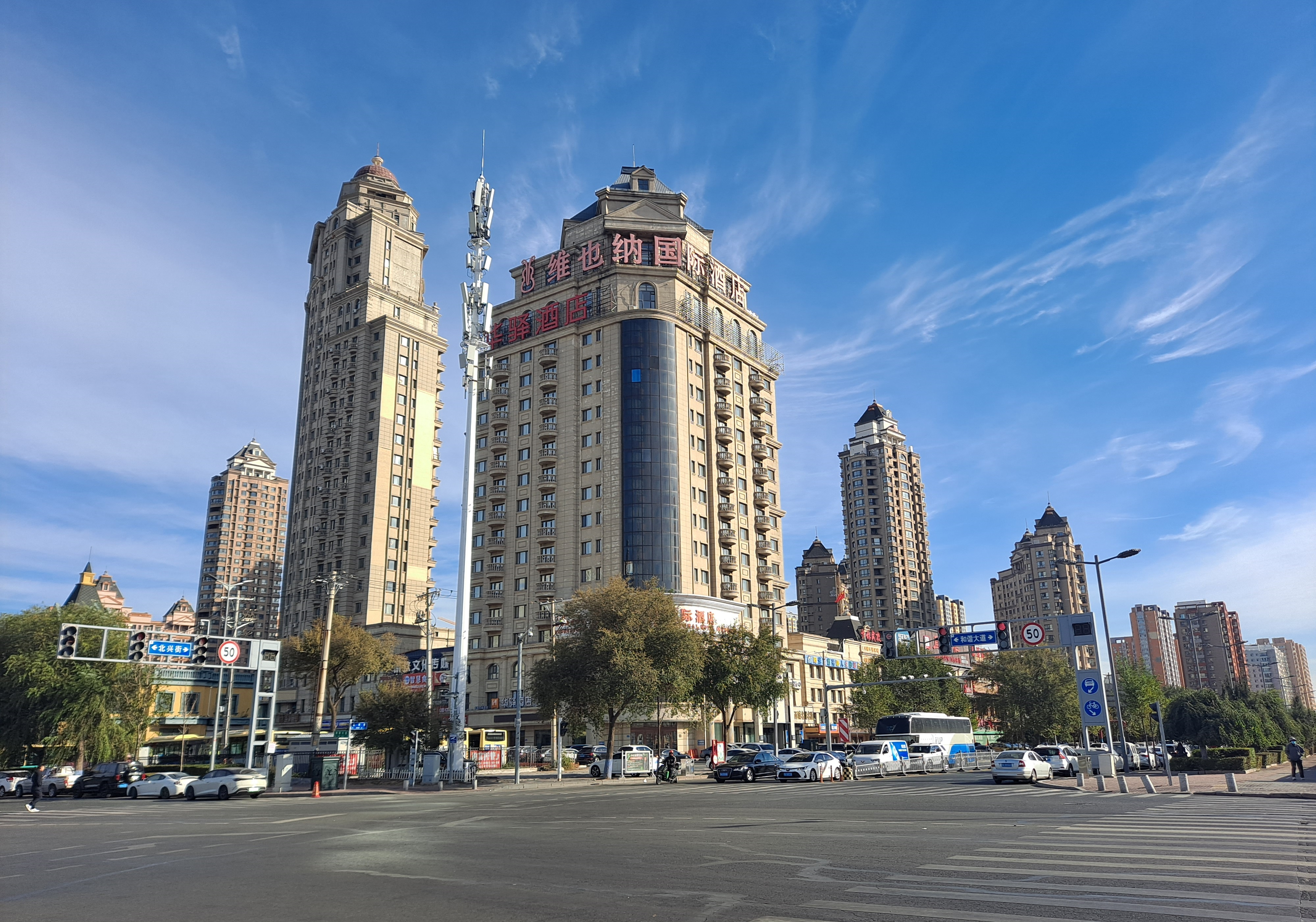

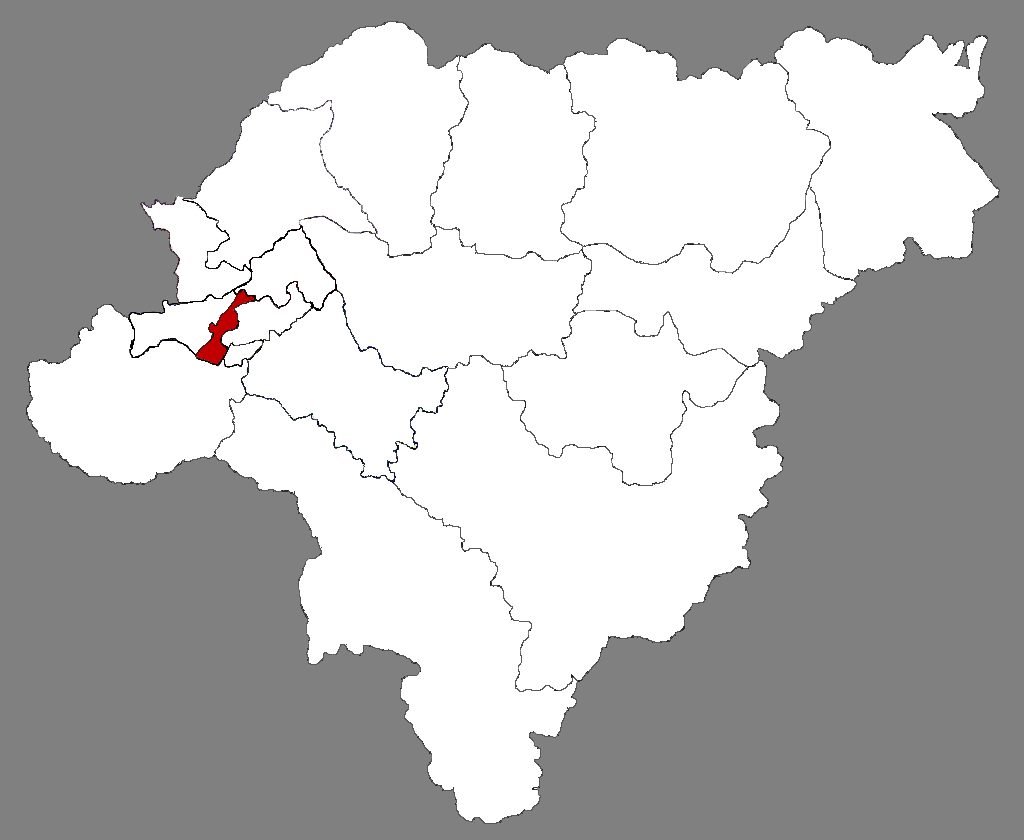
- Location of Nangang in Harbin

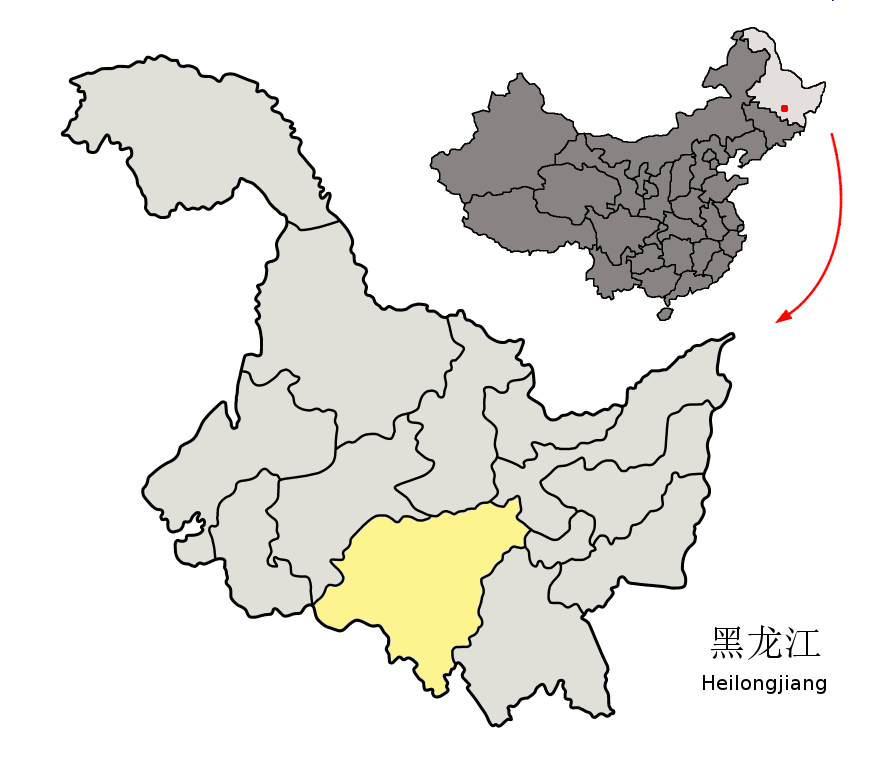
- Harbin in Heilongjiang
- Coordinates: 45°45′39″N 126°40′17″E
- Country: People's Republic of China
- Province: Heilongjiang
- Sub-provincial city: Harbin
- Subdivisions: 18 subdistricts 1 town 1 ethnic township
- Seat: Dacheng Subdistrict (大成街道)

Area
  - Total: 182.9 km^{2} (70.6 sq mi)

Population (2019)
  - Total: 1,047,385
  - Density: 5,727/km^{2} (14,830/sq mi)
- Time zone: UTC+8 (China Standard)
- Postal code: 150000
- Area code: 0451
- Website: hrbng.gov.cn

Nangang District (Chinese: 南岗区; pinyin: Nán-gǎng Qū; Harbin dialect pronunciation: Nán-gàng Qū) is one of nine districts of the prefecture-level city of Harbin, the capital of Heilongjiang Province, Northeast China, forming part of the city's urban core. It is home to major offices of the provincial government and is the political heart of Heilongjiang province. Other areas of interest within the district are the Harbin Railway Station, Guomao underground shopping street, a Confucian temple and the Buddhist Jile Temple. By far the most populous and densely populated of Harbin's county-level divisions, it borders the districts of Daowai and Xiangfang to the northeast, Pingfang to the southeast, Shuangcheng to the south, and Daoli to the west. A new subway system is also being built currently.

Nangang district is also known for the business area around the Hongbo square. There are several shopping centers such as Qiulin corporation, Harbin No. 1 shopping center corporation, and Yuanda shopping center.

The central part of Nangang includes the Harbin Institute of Technology, Northern Theater, and the First Affiliated Hospital of Harbin Medical University.

Well-known streets in Nangang District include Tieling Street, Guogeli Street, Anshan Street, Longjiang Street, Jilin Street and Ashihe Street.

Nangang District also has many schools, such as No. 69 Middle School and Harbin No.3 High School.

A monument honoring fallen Soviet military personnel who took part in the 1945 Operation August Storm, which liberated Northeast China from Japanese control, is located in Nangang District.

== Administrative divisions ==
There are 18 subdistricts, one town, and one ethnic township in the district:

Subdistricts:

- Liaoyuan Subdistrict (燎原街道)
- Dacheng Subdistrict (大成街道)
- Songhuajiang Subdistrict (松花江街道)
- Huayuan Subdistrict (花园街道)
- Quxian Subdistrict (曲线街道)
- Tongda Subdistrict (通达街道)
- Qizheng Subdistrict (七政街道)
- Hexing Road Subdistrict (和兴路街道)
- Haxi Subdistrict (哈西街道)
- Baojian Road Subdistrict (保健路街道)
- Rongshi Subdistrict (荣市街道)
- Fendou Road Subdistrict (奋斗路街道)
- Lujia Subdistrict (芦家街道)
- Gexin Subdistrict (革新街道)
- Wenhua Subdistrict (文化街道)
- Xianfeng Road Subdistrict (先锋街道)
- Xinchun Subdistrict (新春街道)
- Yuejin Subdistrict (跃进街道)

Town:

- Wanggang (王岗镇)

The only ethnic township is Hongqi Manchu Ethnic Township (红旗满族乡)
