= Xiangfang, Harbin =

Xiangfang 香坊区
- District
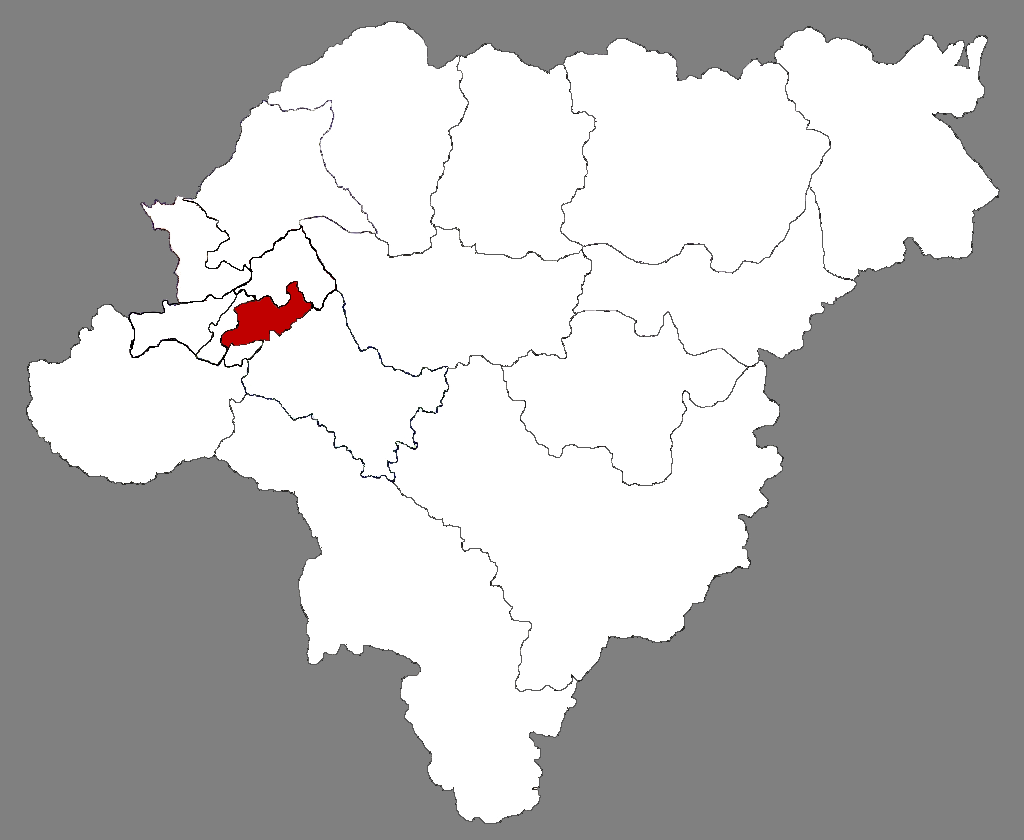
- Location of Xiangfang in Harbin

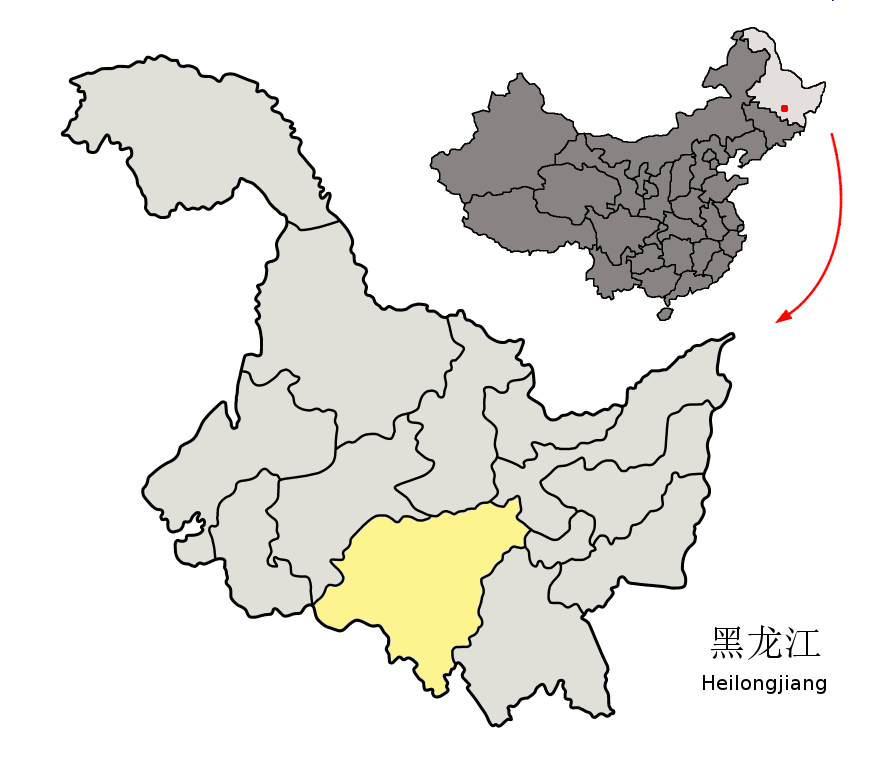
- Harbin in Heilongjiang
- Coordinates: 45°43′26″N 126°40′43″E
- Country: People's Republic of China
- Province: Heilongjiang
- Sub-provincial city: Harbin

Area
  - Total: 339.5 km^{2} (131.1 sq mi)

Population (2019)
  - Total: 741,246
  - Density: 2,183/km^{2} (5,655/sq mi)
- Time zone: UTC+8 (China Standard)
- Website: hrbxf.gov.cn

Xiangfang District (simplified Chinese: 香坊区; traditional Chinese: 香坊區; pinyin: Xiāngfāng Qū) is one of nine districts of the prefecture-level city of Harbin, the capital of Heilongjiang Province, Northeast China. It is an urban district in the pre-1940 part of Harbin, bordering the districts of Daowai to the north, Acheng to the southeast, Pingfang to the southwest, and Nangang to the west. It is an industrialized area, and contains the main scientific, technological and industrial zones of the city. The Harbin Development Zone is in the district.

== Administrative divisions ==
On 15 August 2006, Dongli District (动力区) was merged into Xiangfang District, thus adding Chaoyang Town (朝阳镇).

The current subdistricts are:

- Liming Subdistrict (黎明街道)
- Jianzhu Subdistrict (建筑街道)
- Hapinglu Subdistrict (哈平路街道)
- Anle Subdistrict (安乐街道)
- Anbu Subdistrict (安埠街道)
- Jiankanglu Subdistrict (健康路街道)
- Daiqinglu Subdistrict (大庆路街道)
- Jinxiang Subdistrict (进乡街道)
- Tongtian Subdistrict (通天街道)
- Tongxiang Subdistrict (通乡街道)
- Hepinglu Subdistrict (和平路街道)
- Minshenglu Subdistrict (民生路街道)
- Wenzheng Subdistrict (文政街道)
- Wangzhao Subdistrict (王兆街道)
- Xiangfangdajie Subdistrict (香坊大街街道)
- Xinxiangfang Subdistrict (新香坊街道)
- Tiedong Subdistrict (铁东街道)
- Xincheng Subdistrict (新成街道)
- Hongqi Subdistrict (红旗街道)
- Lushun Subdistrict (六顺街道)

The current towns are:

- Chenggaozi (成高子镇)
- Xingfu (幸福镇)
- Zhaoyang (朝阳镇)
- Xiangyang (向阳镇)
