= Daowai, Harbin =

Daowai 道外区
- District
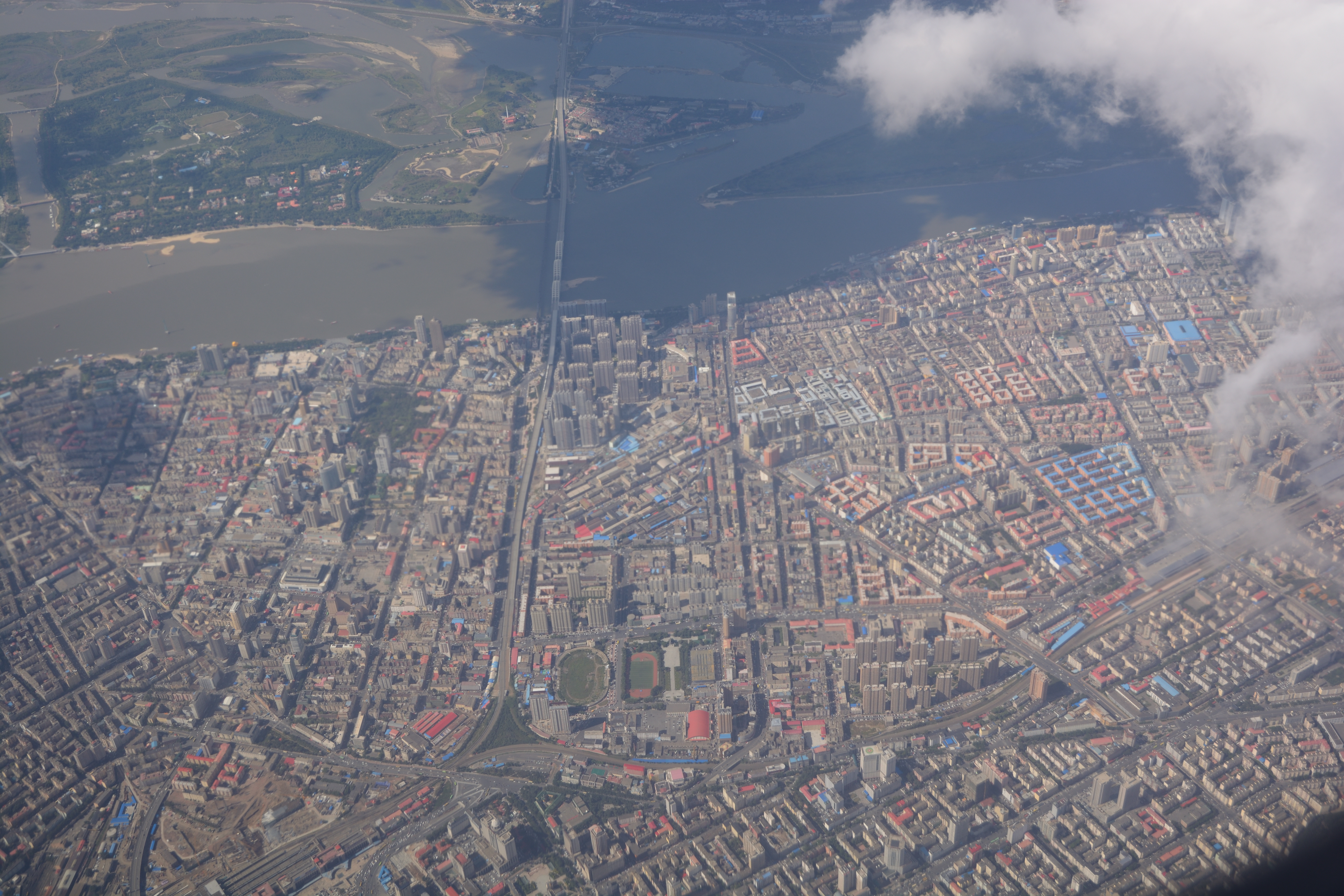

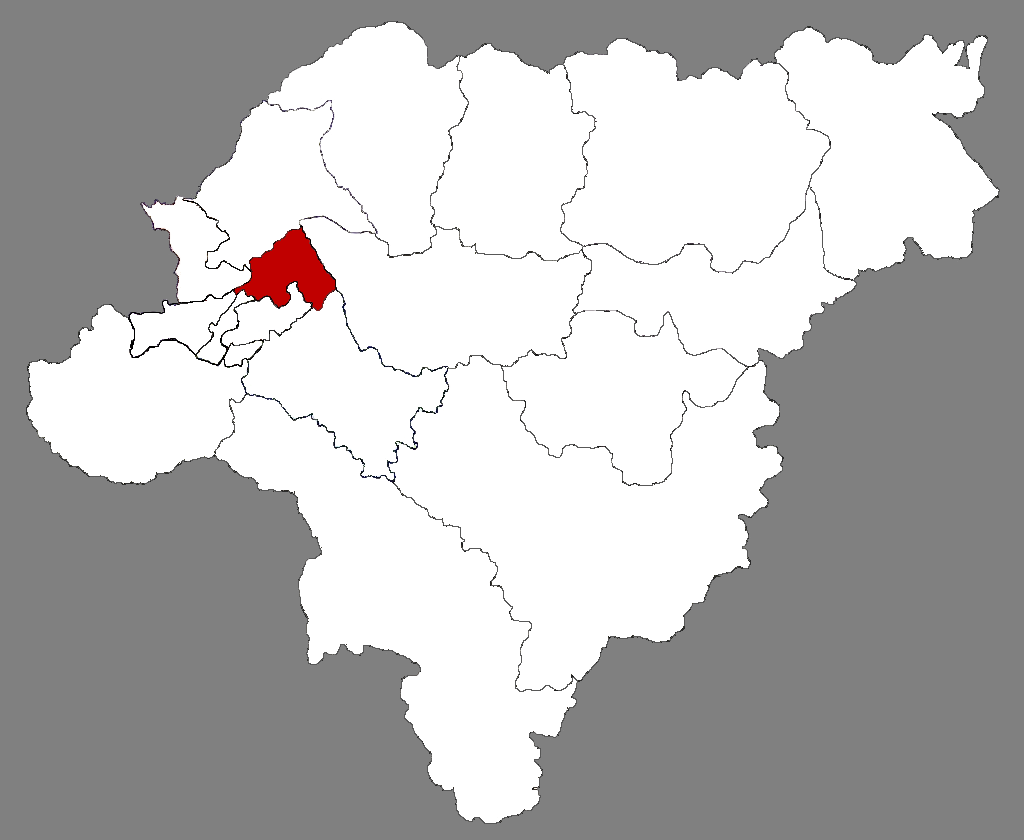
- Location of Daowai in Harbin

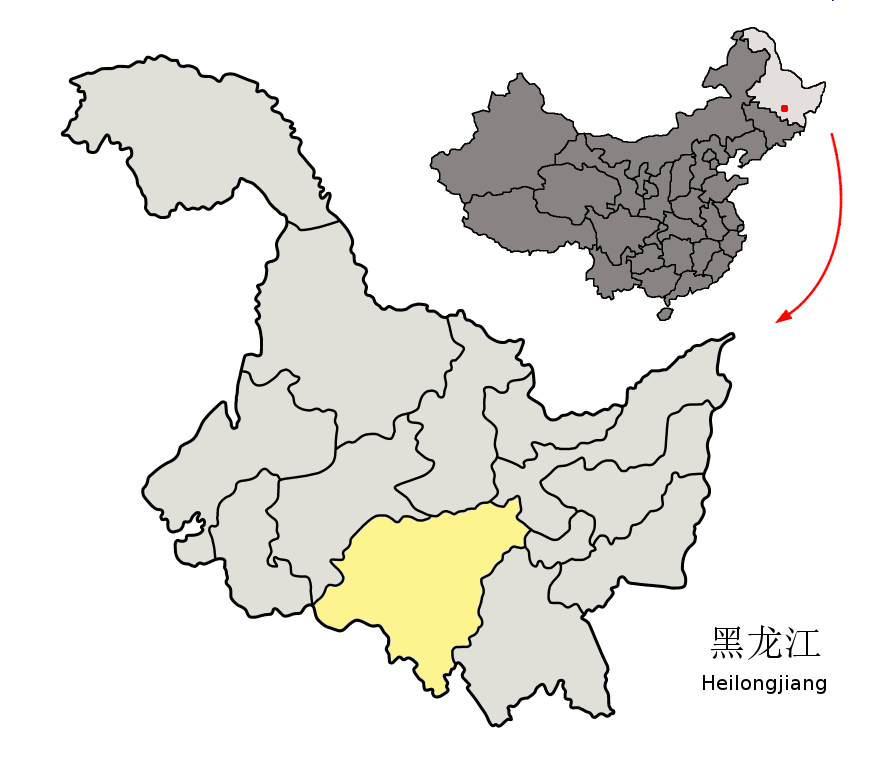
- Harbin in Heilongjiang
- Coordinates: 45°47′22″N 126°38′45″E
- Country: People's Republic of China
- Province: Heilongjiang
- Sub-provincial city: Harbin
- Subdivisions: 22 subdistricts 4 towns
- Seat: Daxing Subdistrict (大兴街道)

Area
  - Total: 618.6 km^{2} (238.8 sq mi)
- Elevation: 119 m (390 ft)

Population (2019)
  - Total: 644,894
  - Density: 1,043/km^{2} (2,700/sq mi)
- Time zone: UTC+8 (China Standard)
- Postal code: 150000
- Area code: 0451
- Website: www.hrbdw.gov.cn

Daowai District (simplified Chinese: 道外区; traditional Chinese: 道外區; pinyin: Dàowài Qū) is one of nine districts of the prefecture-level city of Harbin, the capital of Heilongjiang Province, Northeast China, forming part of the city's urban core. It borders the districts of Hulan to the north, Acheng to the southeast, Xiangfang to the south, Nangang to the southwest, Songbei to the west, as well as Bin County to the east.

== Administrative divisions ==
There are 23 subdistricts (街道) and 4 towns (镇) in the district:

=== Subdistricts ===
- Daxing Subdistrict (大兴街道)
- Shengli Subdistrict (胜利街道)
- Dongyuan Subdistrict (东原街道)
- Donglai Subdistrict (东莱街道)
- Taigu Subdistrict (太古街道)
- Jingyu Subdistrict (靖宇街道)
- Binjiang Subdistrict (滨江街道)
- Nanma Subdistrict (南马街道)
- Renli Subdistrict (仁里街道)
- Chongjian Subdistrict (崇俭街道)
- Zhenjiang Subdistrict (振江街道)
- Dayoufang Subdistrict (大有坊街道)
- Sankeshudajie Subdistrict (三棵树大街街道)
- Huochetou Subdistrict (火车头街道)
- Taipingdajie Subdistrict (太平大街街道)
- Lihua Subdistrict (黎华街道)
- Xinyue Subdistrict (新乐街道)
- Xinyi Subdistrict (新一街道)
- Minqiang Subdistrict (民强街道)
- Nanzhilu Subdistrict (南直路街道)
- Shuini Subdistrict (水泥街道)
- Nanshi Subdistrict (南市街道)
- Huagong Subdistrict (化工街道)

=== Towns ===
- Tuanjie (团结镇)
- Juyuan (巨源镇)
- Yongyuan (永源镇)
- Minzhu (民主镇)
