= Daqing West railway station =

Railway station in China

Coordinates: 46.6551°N 124.8796°E

Daqing West 大庆西
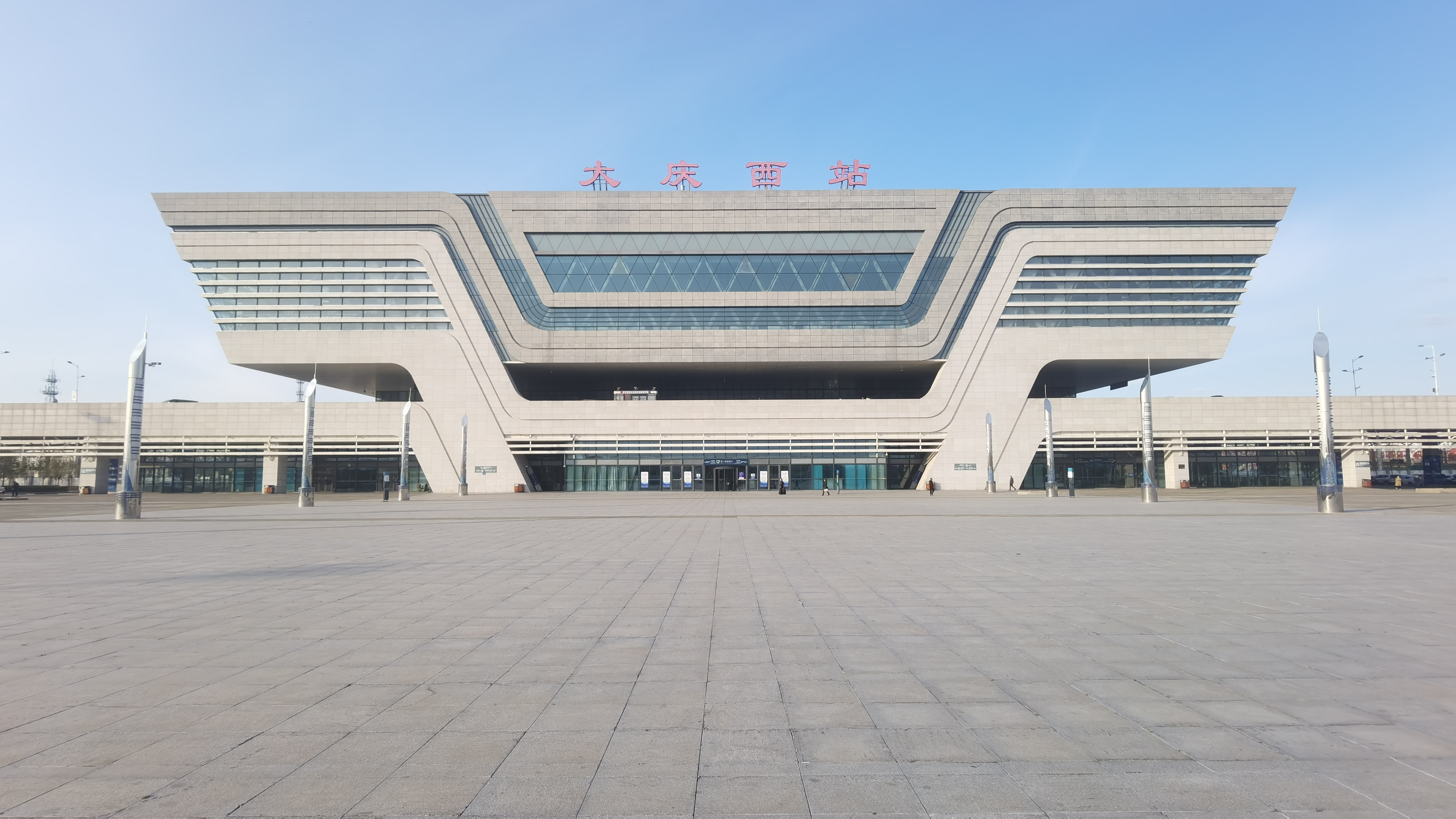

General information
- Other names: Daqing West
- Location: Ranghulu District, Daqing, Heilongjiang; China
- Operated by: China Railway Harbin Group, China Railway Corporation
- Line(s): Harbin–Qiqihar intercity railway, Harbin-Manzhouli railway, Tongliao–Ranghulu railway

Daqing West railway station is a railway station of the Harbin–Qiqihar Intercity Railway. It is located in Ranghulu District, Daqing, in the Heilongjiang province of China.

== See also ==
- Chinese Eastern Railway

Preceding station	China Railway	Following station
Daqing towards Harbin	Harbin–Manzhouli railway	Dorbod towards Zabaykalsk
Xinzhao towards Tongliao	Tongliao–Ranghulu railway	Terminus
Preceding station	China Railway High-speed	Following station
Daqing East towards Harbin	Harbin–Qiqihar intercity railway	Dorbod towards Qiqihar
