= Dorbod railway station =

Railway station in China

Coordinates: 46.8687°N 124.4407°E

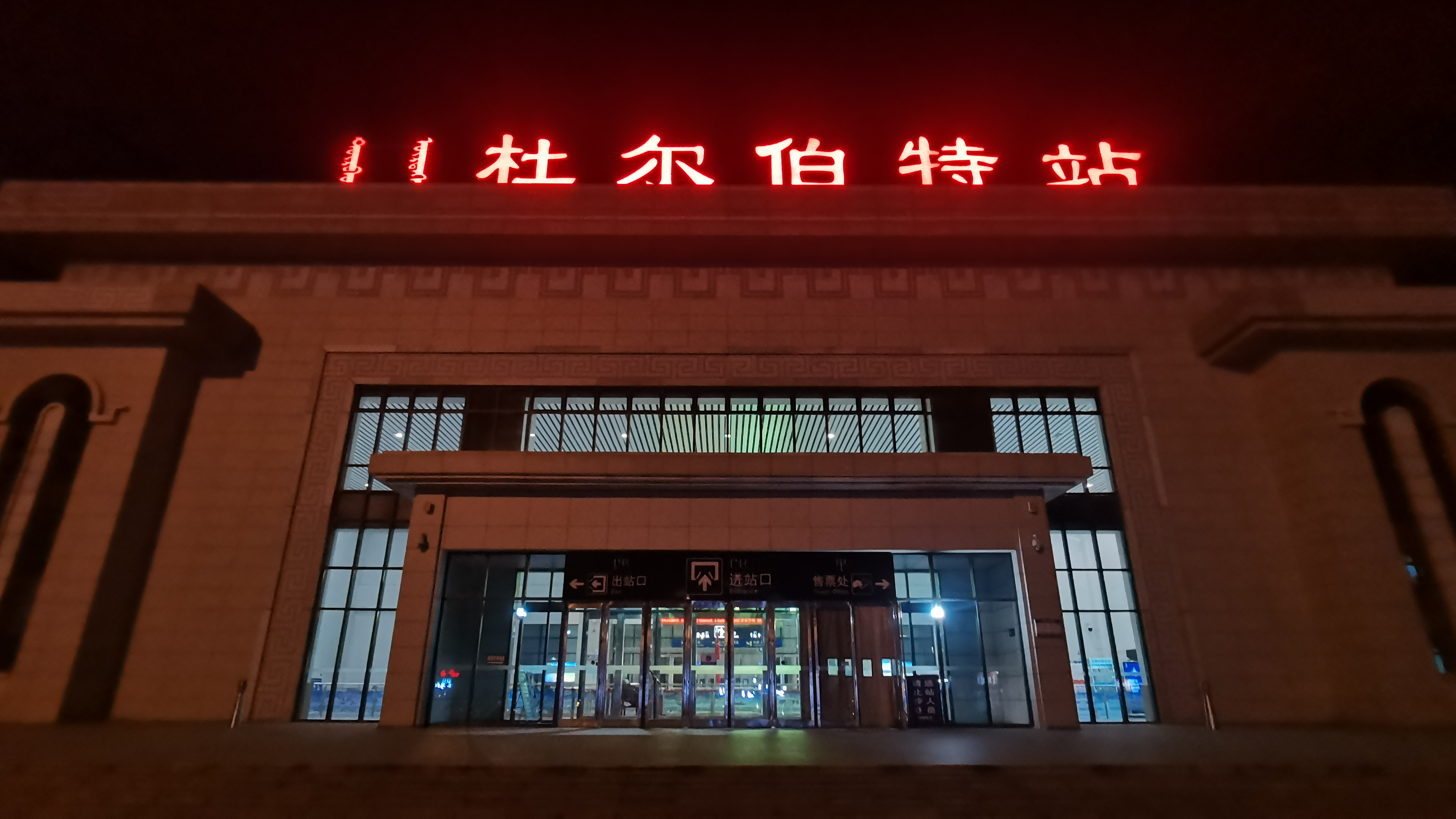
Dorbod railway station

Dorbod railway station (Chinese: 杜尔伯特站; pinyin: Dù'ěrbótè zhàn), formerly Taikang railway station (Chinese: 泰康站; pinyin: Tàikāng zhàn), is a railway station of Harbin–Manzhouli Railway, and located in Dorbod Mongol Autonomous County, Daqing, Heilongjiang, China.

== Station information ==
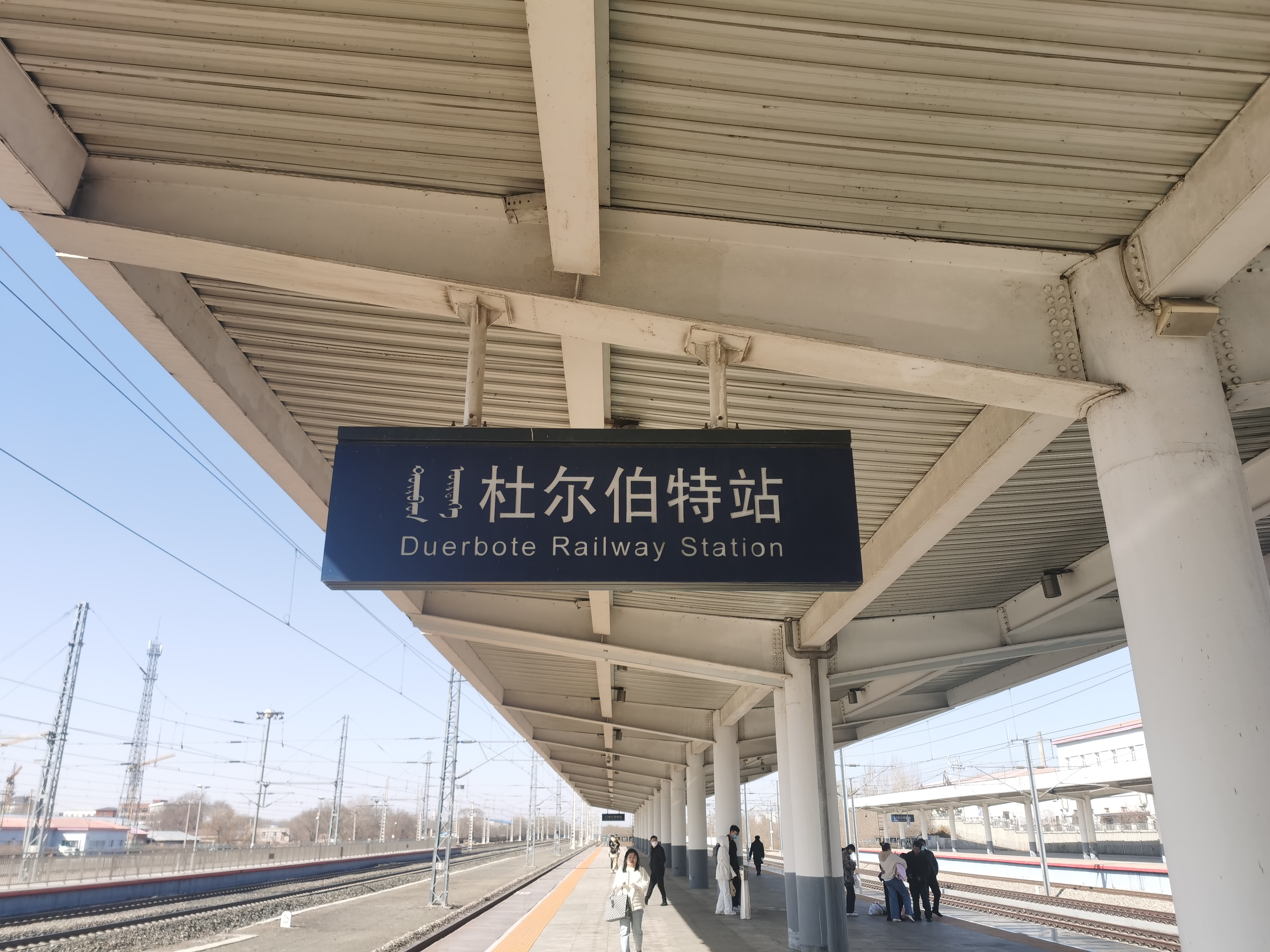
Platform of Dorbod station

Dorbod railway station was built in 1902, gradually evolving from a small station into a key hub of the Harbin–Qiqihar intercity railway.

Since the advent of high-speed rail, the station has seen 42 trains stop daily, with an average of 1,800 passengers departing each day and an annual freight dispatch volume of 65,000 tons.

In May 2018, the name of the station Taikang, a Chinese name during the Republican period, was changed to Dorbod, a Mongolian name.

Preceding station	China Railway	Following station
Daqing West towards Harbin	Harbin–Manzhouli railway	Yantongtun towards Zabaykalsk
Preceding station	China Railway High-speed	Following station
Daqing West towards Harbin	Harbin–Qiqihar intercity railway	Qiqihar South towards Qiqihar
