= K7015/7016 Harbin–Qiqihar through train =

Railway service in Heilongjiang, China

The K7015/7016 Harbin–Qiqihar through train (Chinese: K7015/7016次哈尔滨西到齐齐哈尔快速列车) is a Chinese railway running between Harbin to Qiqihar express passenger trains by the Harbin Railway Bureau, Harbin passenger segment responsible for passenger transport task, Habin originating on the Qiqihar train. 25G Type Passenger trains running along the Binzhou Railway and Pingqi Railway across Heilongjiang provinces, the entire 310 km. Harbin West Railway Station to Qiqihar Railway Station running 3 hours and 30 minutes, use trips for K7015; Qiqihar Railway Station to Qiqihar Railway Station to run 4 hours and 10 minutes, use trips for K7016.

== See also ==
- Harbin-Qiqihar Through Train
