= D29/30 Beijing–Qiqihar through train =

Chinese railway service

The D29/30 Beijing–Qiqihar through train (Chinese:D29/30次北京到齐齐哈尔南动车组列车) is a Chinese railway running between the capital Beijing to Qiqihar express passenger trains by the Harbin Railway Bureau, Qiqihar passenger segment responsible for passenger transport task, Qiqihar originating on the Beijing train. CRH5 Type Passenger trains running along the Jingha Railway, Harbin–Dalian High-Speed Railway and Harbin–Qiqihar Intercity Railway across Heilongjiang, Jilin, Liaoning, Hebei, Tianjin, Beijing and other provinces and cities, the entire 1530 km. Beijing railway station to Qiqihar South railway station running 10 hours and 17 minutes, use trips for D29; Qiqihar South railway station to Beijing railway station to run 10 hours and 6 minutes, use trips for D30.

== See also ==
- 1801/1802 Beijing–Qiqihar Through Train
- T39/40 Beijing–Qiqihar Through Train
- T47/48 Beijing–Qiqihar Through Train
- D25/26 Beijing–Qiqihar Through Train
