= Qiqihar–Bei'an railway =

Railway line in Heilongjiang, China

The Qiqihar–Bei'an railway or Qibei railway (simplified Chinese: 齐北铁路; traditional Chinese: 齊北鐵路; pinyin: qíběi tiělù), is a single-track railroad in northeastern China between Qiqihar and Bei'an in Heilongjiang Province. The line is 231 km (144 mi) long and was built between 1928 and 1933. Major cities and towns along route include Qiqihar, Fuyu, Keshan and Beian.

== Line description ==
In the south, the Qibei railway begins outside the city of Qiqihar in the district of Ang'angxi, at the railroad junction with the Harbin–Manzhouli railway. It heads northeast to Fuyu, where the Fuyu-Nenjiang (Funen) railway continues northeast and this line turns eastward toward Keshan and Bei'an. At Bei'an, it intersects with the Harbin–Beian railway.

== History ==
In 1909, the Qing Dynasty planned a railway from Jinzhou to Qiqihar to Aihui, which includes a segment that coincides with the Qibei Line. Wary of Russian and Japanese designs on the region, the Qing government signed a financing agreement with an Anglo-American consortium but the railway was never built. Actual construction began in June 1928 when northeastern China was ruled by the Republic of China, and the line was planned to run 205 km to Keshan. The section from Qiqihar to Yi'an entered into operation in January 1931. The Mukden Incident of September 18, 1931 halted further work on the Qiqihar–Keshan (Qike) railway, as it was known. In June 1932, the Japanese Kwantung Army resumed construction. This effort was hampered by attacks and sabotage by partisan forces led by Ma Zhanshan, Su Bingwen and others. From October 20 to November 10, 1932, Ma's Northeast Anti-Japanese National Salvation Army laid siege to the Laha station before being driven back by Japanese and collaborationist reinforcements. The rest of the line to Be'ian was completed in November 1933.

== Stations ==
Station name	Chinese	Distance (km)	Connections
Qiqihar	齐齐哈尔	0	Harbin–Manzhouli railway
Gaotou	高头	10	
Fengtun	冯屯	17	
Dahabo	大哈伯		
Taha	塔哈	30	
Qunli	群力	39	
Zhonghe	中和	49	
Hachuan	哈川	55	
Fuyu	富裕	63	Fuyu–Nenjiang railway
Shulin	树林	79	
Fuhai	富海	96	
Xintun	新屯		
Yi'an	依安	129	
Taidong	泰东		
Gucheng	古城	161	
Keshan	克山	175	
Guojia	郭家		
Kedong	克东	207	
Bei'an	北安	231	Bei'an–Heihe railway

== See also ==
- List of railways in China
