= Anda railway station =

Railway station in China

Coordinates: 46°24′2.124″N 125°18′57.622″E

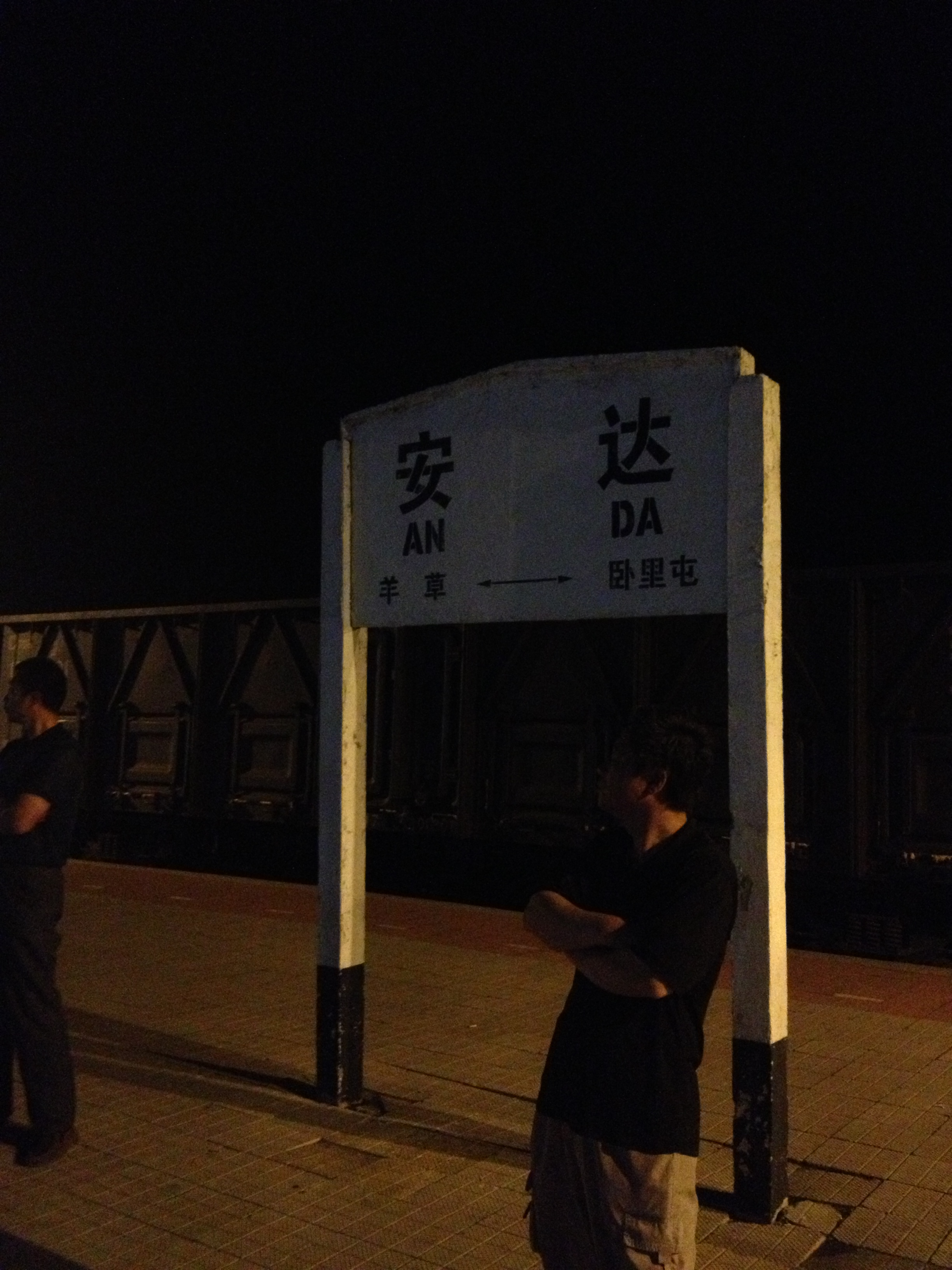
Anda railway station

Anda Railway Station is a railway station on the Binzhou Railway in Heilongjiang, China.

Preceding station	China Railway	Following station
Yangcao towards Harbin	Harbin–Manzhouli railway	Daqing East towards Zabaykalsk
Preceding station	China Railway High-speed	Following station
Zhaodong towards Harbin	Harbin–Qiqihar intercity railway	Daqing East towards Qiqihar
