= Harbin North railway station =

Railway station in China

Coordinates: 45.8486°N 126.5302°E

Haerbinbei 哈尔滨北
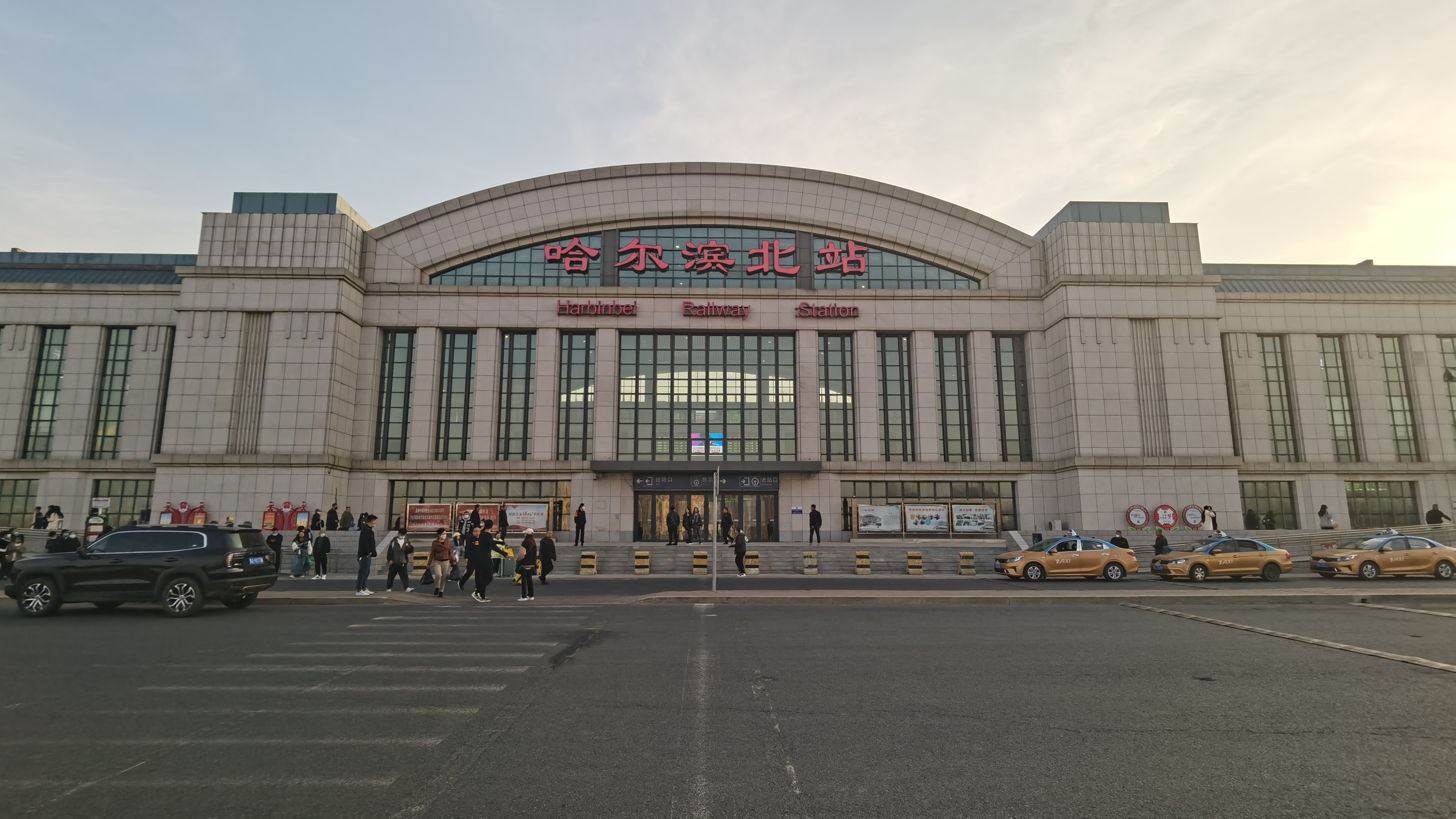

General information
- Other names: Harbin North
- Location: Harbin, Heilongjiang; China
- Operator: China Railway High-speed, China Railway Corporation
- Lines: Harbin–Qiqihar, Harbin–Manzhouli; Harbin–Yichun high-speed railway
Location

Harbin North railway station (Chinese: 哈尔滨北站; pinyin: Hāěrbīnběi Zhàn) is a railway station of Harbin–Qiqihar Intercity Railway and located in Harbin, Heilongjiang Province, China. The station was opened in 2015 with both conventional rail and high-speed rail services.

The station is the closest railway station to Harbin's Hulan University town and the renowned Harbin International Ice and Snow Sculpture Festival.

== Metro station ==
Line 2 of Harbin Metro opened on September 19, 2021.

Preceding station	China Railway	Following station
Harbin Terminus	Harbin–Manzhouli railway	Wanle towards Zabaykalsk
Preceding station	China Railway High-speed	Following station
Harbin Terminus	Harbin–Qiqihar intercity railway	Zhaodong towards Qiqihar
