= Zhaodong railway station =

Railway station in China

Coordinates: 46°4′32.520″N 125°59′35.160″E

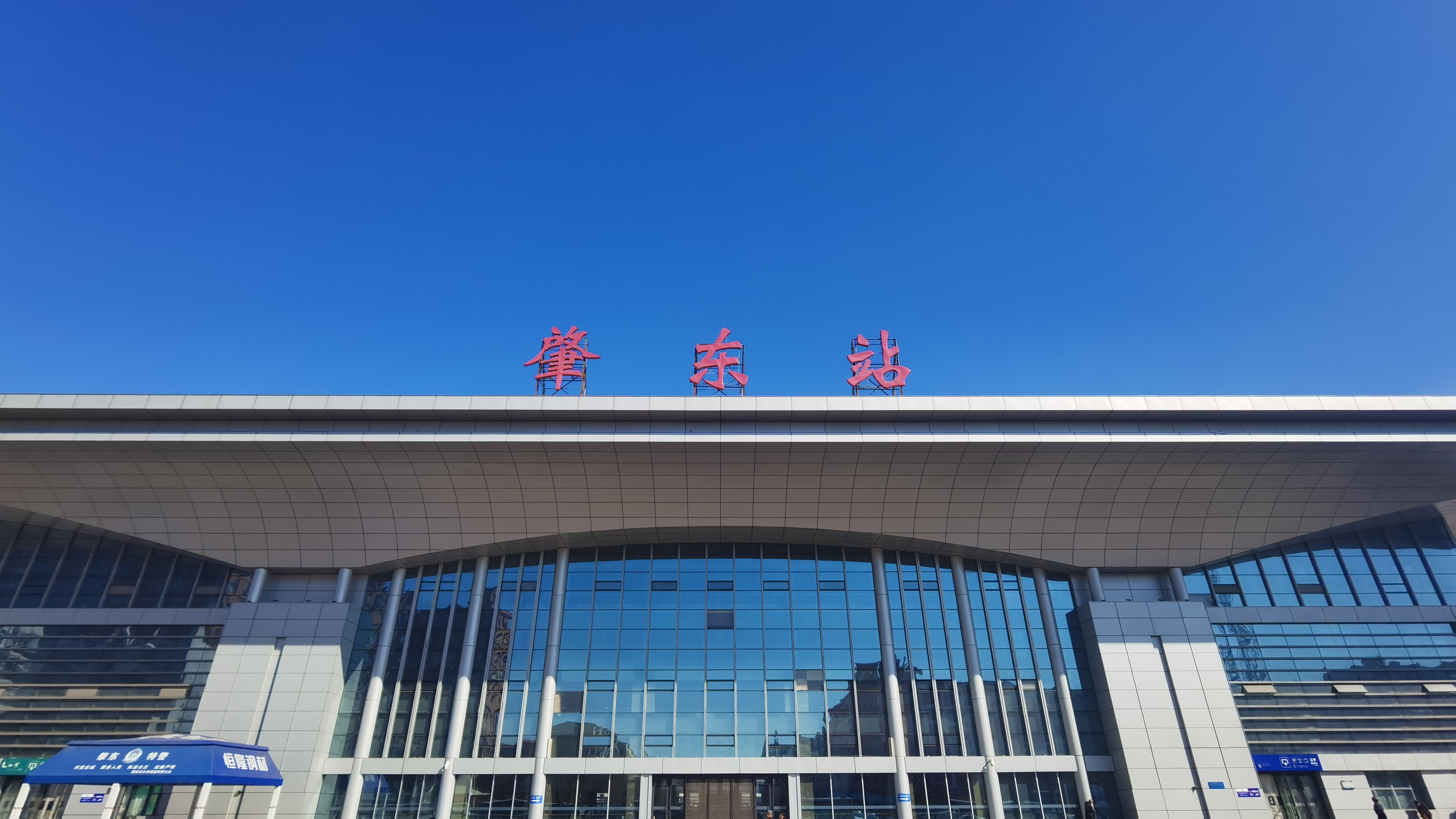
Zhaodong Railway Station, Suihua City, Heilongjiang Province

Zhaodong railway station is a railway station on the Binzhou Railway located in Heilongjiang, China.

Preceding station	China Railway	Following station
Jiangjia towards Harbin	Harbin–Manzhouli railway	Shangjia towards Zabaykalsk
Preceding station	China Railway High-speed	Following station
Harbin North towards Harbin	Harbin–Qiqihar intercity railway	Anda towards Qiqihar
