= D25/26 Beijing–Qiqihar through train =

Railway service in China

The D25/26 Beijing–Qiqihar through train (Chinese:D25/26次北京到齐齐哈尔南动车组列车) is a Chinese railway running between the capital Beijing to Qiqihar express passenger trains by the Beijing Railway Bureau, Qiqihar passenger segment responsible for passenger transport task, Qiqihar originating on the Beijing train. CRH5 Type Passenger trains running along the Jingha Railway, Harbin–Dalian High-Speed Railway and Harbin–Qiqihar Intercity Railway across Heilongjiang, Jilin, Liaoning, Hebei, Tianjin, Beijing and other provinces and cities, the entire 1530 km. Beijing railway station to Qiqihar South railway station running 10 hours and 28 minutes, use trips for D25; Qiqihar South railway station to Beijing railway station to run 9 hours and 38 minutes, use trips for D26.

== See also ==
- 1801/1802 Beijing-Qiqihar Through Train
- T39/40 Beijing-Qiqihar Through Train
- T47/48 Beijing-Qiqihar Through Train
- D29/30 Beijing-Qiqihar Through Train
