= Daqing East railway station =

Railway station in Daqing, China

Coordinates: 46.5307°N 125.1161°E

Daqingdong 大庆东
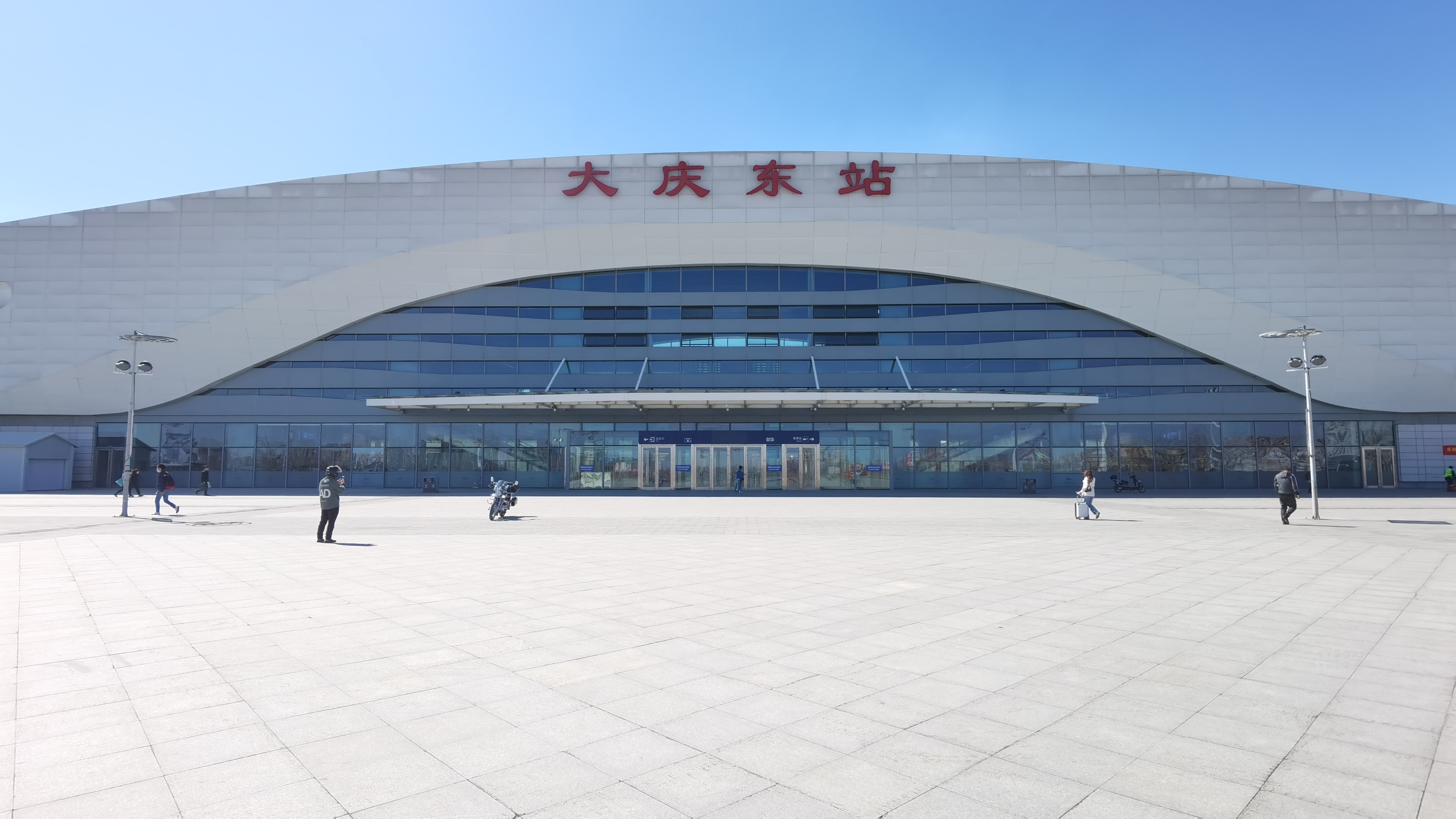
- Daqing East Railway Station

General information
- Other names: Daqing East
- Location: Longfeng District, Daqing, Heilongjiang; China
- Operated by: China Railway Harbin Group, China Railway Corporation
- Lines: Harbin–Qiqihar, Harbin–Manzhouli
Location

Daqing East railway station is a railway station of the Harbin–Qiqihar Intercity Railway and Harbin–Manzhouli Railway. It is located in Longfeng District, Daqing, in the Heilongjiang province of China. Construction for the station started in 2012 and it opened in 2015. The station has four platforms and eight tracks, and its premises take up an area of 270,000 square metres (320,000 sq yd).

== See also ==
- Chinese Eastern Railway

Preceding station	China Railway	Following station
Anda towards Harbin	Harbin–Manzhouli railway	Daqing towards Zabaykalsk
Preceding station	China Railway High-speed	Following station
Anda towards Harbin	Harbin–Qiqihar intercity railway	Daqing West towards Qiqihar
