= Harbin–Suifenhe railway =

Railway line in Northeast China

Trans-Siberian Binsui Railway
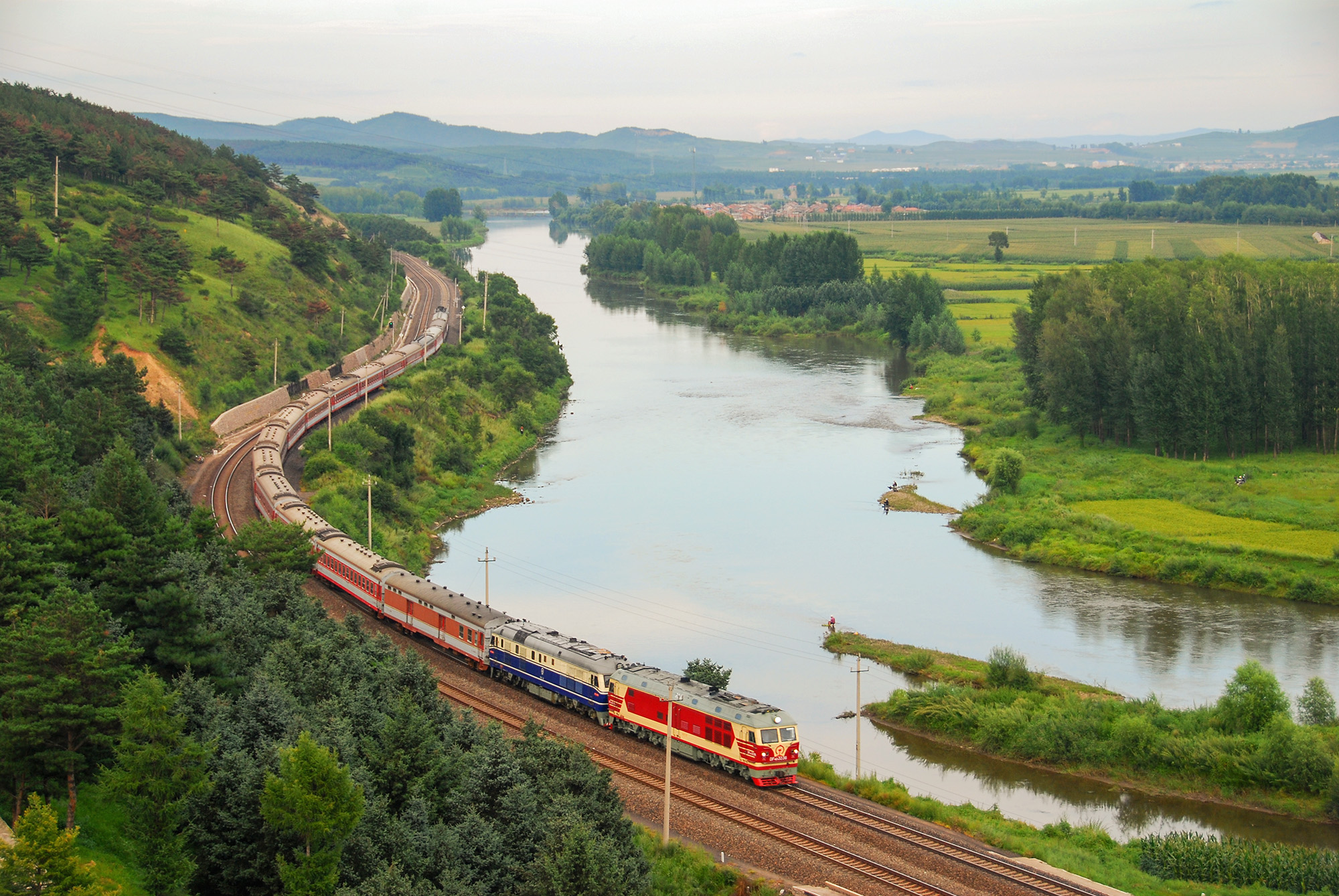
- Train K1452 on the Binsui Railway along the Hailang River near Hailin

Overview
- Native name: 滨绥铁路 (Bīnsuí Tiělù)
- Status: Operational
- Owner: Chinese Eastern Railway (1901–1932); North Manchuria Railway (1932–1935); Manchukuo National Railway (1935–1945); China Changchun Railway (1945–1955); China Railway (since 1955)
- Locale: Heilongjiang, Inner Mongolia
- Termini: Harbin; Manzhouli

Service
- Type: Heavy rail, Regional rail

History
- Opened: 14 November 1901

Technical
- Line length: 548 km (341 mi)
- Track gauge: 1,435 mm (4 ft 8 1/2 in) standard gauge
- Old gauge: 1,520 mm (4 ft 11 27/32 in) Russian gauge
- Electrification: 25 kV 50 Hz AC Overhead lines Harbin-Suifinhe Section

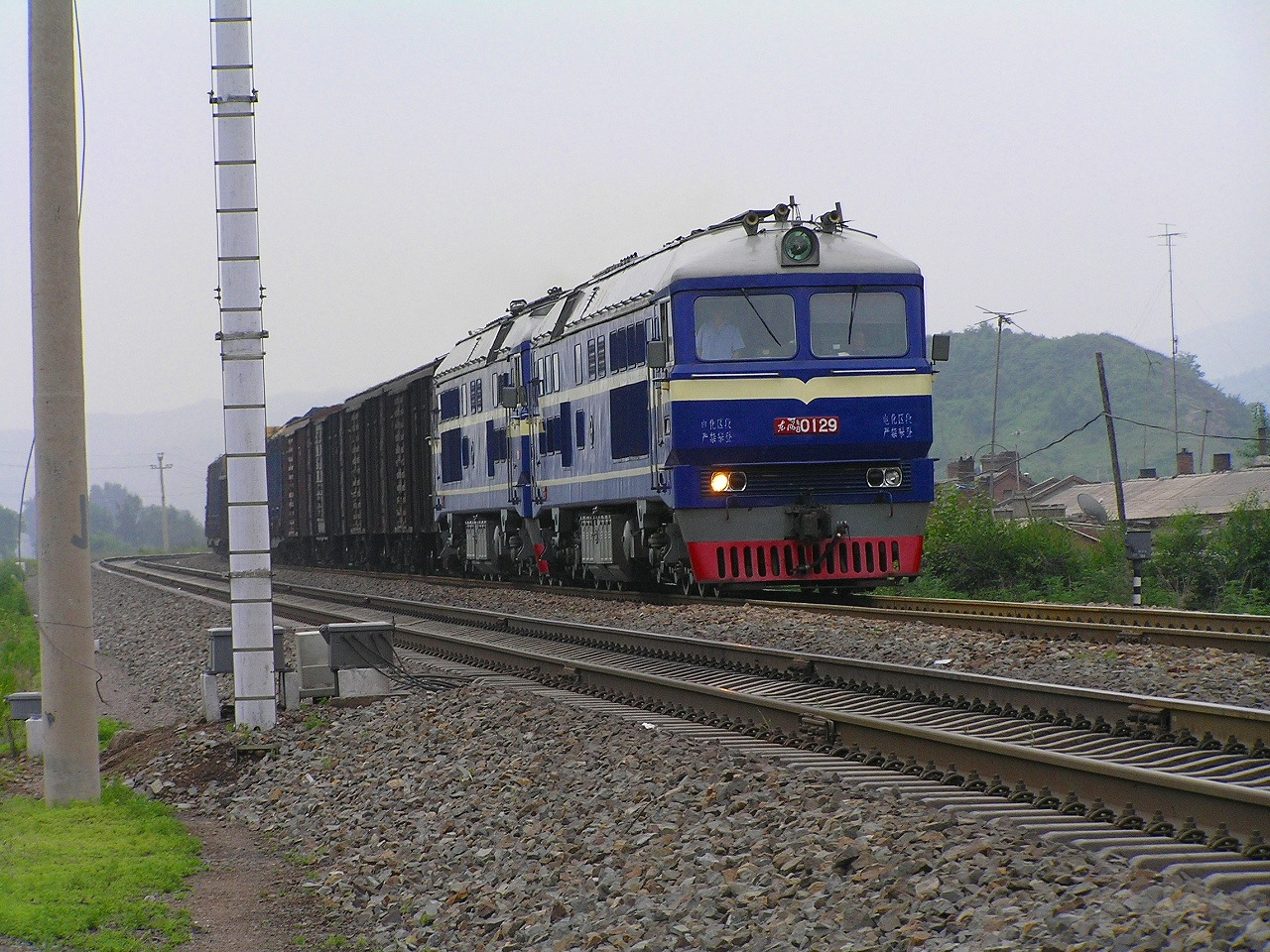
Freight train carrying coal on the Harbin–Suifenhe railway near the Yuquan Station in Harbin

The Trans-Siberian Harbin–Suifenhe railway, named the Binsui Railway (simplified Chinese: 滨绥铁路; traditional Chinese: 濱綏鐵路; pinyin: bīnsuí tiělù), is a double-track electrified trunk railway in Northeast China between Harbin and Suifenhe on the Russian border. The line was originally built by Russia as the eastern branch of the Chinese Eastern Railway, which linked Chita with Vladivostok. Today, the 548 km (341 mi) railway is administered by Harbin Railway Bureau.

== History ==
Initial construction of the Binsui Railway as a Russian gauge line of the Sino-Russian Chinese Eastern Railway started on 9 June 1898 at the two termini of the line, Harbin in China and Ussuriysk in Russia. The partially built line was destroyed during the Boxer Rebellion between March and July 1900, causing the project to be suspended. Construction resumed in October, and on 14 November 1901 operation on a temporary basis was started. Official opening of the line took place on 14 July 1903.

After the creation of the Japanese puppet state of Manchukuo in 1932, the CER became a Soviet-Manchukuo joint enterprise, and was renamed the "North Manchuria Railway". In March 1935, the government of Manchukuo purchased the Soviet share of the NMR, and merged it into the Manchukuo National Railway, and on 17 June 1936, work to convert the line, known during that time as the Binsui Line (Hinsui Line in Japanese), from Russian broad gauge to standard gauge was completed. The MNR double tracked the line as far as Yimianpo in 1939, and relaid the line with heavier rail in 1942.

The MNR began construction of the original Ducao Tunnel in July 1937, opening the new, shorter line on 31 July 1942. At 3,849 m (12,628 ft), it was China's longest railway tunnel. To expand the capacity of the line, China Railway decided to build a second tunnel, 3,900 m (12,800 ft) in length, in 1961, but construction was suspended a year later. Work resumed on 1 May 1975, and was completed by the end of 1978. Refurbishment of the original tunnel began in September 1985 and was completed on 21 December 1988.

After the Soviet invasion of Manchuria in 1945, the Soviet Army converted the line back to Russian broad gauge. In 1946, it was converted back to standard gauge once again, and the double tracking was removed; the rails taken up were used to repair other lines. Between 1945 and 1955, the railways in the territory of the former Manchukuo were controlled by the Sino-Soviet China Changchun Railway, after which the railways of the region were taken over by China Railways; the Binsui Line then reverted to its original name, Binsui Railway. The double tracking of the section from Harbin to Mudanjiang was rebuilt by China Railways in 1958. Electrification of the line began in 2010, and the first section, from Mudanjiang to Suifenhe, was completed on 28 December 2015. Wiring of the Harbin–Mudanjiang section began in April 2016. Passenger traffic on the line has increased to 2.3 million passengers annually.

== Route ==
Distance		Station name			
Total; km	S2S; km	Current name	Former name	Year opened	Connections
0	0	Harbin 哈尔滨	Songhuajiang 松花江	1899	Binbei Railway, Jingha Railway, Binzhou Railway, Binbei Railway
5	5	Wangzhaotun 王兆屯	Muchaichang 木柴厂	1899	
7	2	Xiangfang 香坊	Harbin 哈尔滨, Харбин (1898–1904); Old Harbin 老哈尔滨 (1904–1924)	1898	Labin Railway
14	7	New Xiangfang 新香坊		1937	Sunxin Connecting Line, Sankeshu Railway (zh)
20	6	Chenggaozi 成高子			Chengbin Railway (zh)
30	10	Shelitun 舍利屯	Cheng 程		
41	11	Acheng 阿城	Ashenhe 阿什河	1901	
		~~Hongfangzihuirang~~; ~~红房子会让~~			Closed
52	11	Yagou 亚沟	Taiyagou 太亚沟		
62	10	Yuquan 玉泉	Ercengdianzi 二层甸子	1899	
68	6	Baimaozi 白帽子	Shihuiyao 石灰窑		(passenger only)
73	5	Bailing 白岭			
79	6	Xiaoling 小岭			
84	5	Xiaopingshan 小平山			
89	5	Pingshan 平山		1899	
95	6	East Pingshan 东平山			
100	5	Maorshan 帽儿山			
110	10	Mifeng 蜜蜂	Mishan 蜜山	1899	
122	12	Xiaojiu 小九		1899	
131	9	Wujimi 乌吉密		1899	
141	10	Shangzhi 尚志	Zhuhe 珠河	1899	
151	10	Mayan 马延	Yakuni 亚库尼	1899	
161	10	Yimianpo 一面坡		1899	
169	8	Jiujiangpao 九江泡	Lukashevo (Лукашево); Luketuwo (鲁克土窝)	1901	
181	12	Wanshan 万山	Samokhvalov (Самохвалов); Samohawaluofu (萨莫哈瓦洛)	1899	
192	11	Weihe 苇河		1899	Weiya Railway (zh), Weilin Railway
202	10	Qingyun 青云	Kazantsevo (Казанцево); Kazancaiwo (喀赞才窝)	1899	
212	10	Yabuli 亚布力	Yabloni (Яблони); Yabuluoni (亚布洛尼)	1899	Yalin Railway (zh)
		~~Xinxing~~; ~~新兴~~			
226	14	~~Shitouhezi~~; ~~石头河子~~	~~Reko-Ridzh (Реко-Ридж)~~; ~~Liangziling (亮子岭)~~	1901	Closed 1993
229	17	Yuchi 鱼池			
234	5	~~Lengshan~~; ~~冷山~~	~~Liudaohezi~~; ~~六道河子~~	1900	Closed 1993
240	11	Kaidao 开道			
		~~Xima~~; ~~洗马~~			Closed 1993
248		~~Gaolingzi~~; ~~高岭子~~		1900	Closed 1993
249	9	Hufeng 虎峰			
252	3	Ducao 杜草		1940	
		~~Fenlinghe~~; ~~分岭河~~			Closed 1993
261	9	Zhishan 治山	Salahe 萨拉河	1900	
272	11	Hengdaohezi 横道河子		1900	
282	10	Daolin 道林	Sandaowoji 三道窝集	1901	
294	12	Qinglingzi 青岭子	Changlingzi 长岭子	1901	
304	10	Shanshi 山市	Shanshi 山石	1901	
314	10	Qifeng 奇峰	Shihe 石河	1901	
323	9	Aotou 敖头		1937	Huolonggou Railway (zh)
333	10	Hailin 海林		1901	
343	10	Lagu 拉古		1937	
349	6	~~Huanghua~~; ~~黄花~~		1942	Closed
		~~Ningbei~~; ~~宁北~~			Closed
355	6	Mudanjiang 牡丹江		1901	Mujia Railway (zh), Mujia PDR (zh), Mutu Railway (zh), Tujia Railway (zh), Hamu PDR (zh)
362	7	Aihe 爱河	Miehe 乜河	1901	
378	16	Modaoshi 磨刀石		1901	
382	4	~~Shandi~~; ~~山底~~			Closed
391	9	~~Daguanling~~; ~~大观岭站~~	~~Shanling~~; ~~山岭~~	1901	Closed
396	5	~~Shandong~~; ~~山洞~~			Closed
404	13	Daimagou 代马沟	Taimagou 抬马沟	1901	Closed
417	13	Beilin 北林	Beilinhe 北林河	1901	Closed
430	13	~~Old Muling~~; ~~老穆陵~~	~~Muling~~; ~~穆陵~~	1901	Closed
442	12	~~Yilin~~; ~~伊林~~		1900	Closed
443	65 (from Modaoshi)	Muling 穆陵		2015	Chengji Railway (zh)
453	11 (from Yilin)	~~Xiachengzi~~; ~~下城子~~	~~Xiaochengzi~~; ~~小城子~~	1900	Closed
462	9	~~Maqiaohe~~; ~~马桥河~~	~~Magouhe~~; ~~马沟河~~	1900	Closed
475	13	~~Hongfangzi~~; ~~红房子~~	~~Hulimihe~~; ~~虎力密河~~	1900	Closed
485	10	~~Tailing~~; ~~太岭~~	~~Taipingling~~; ~~太平岭~~	1900	Closed
501	58 (from Modaoshi)	Xilinhe 细鳞河		1899	
511	10	~~Suixi~~; ~~绥西~~	~~Sanchagou~~; ~~三岔沟~~	1899	Closed
523	12	Suiyang 绥阳	Xiaosuifen 小绥芬	1899	
541	18	~~Kuangou~~; ~~宽沟~~	~~Badaohezi~~; ~~八道河子~~	1898	Closed
548	7	Suifenhe 绥芬河	Station No. 5 Станция No.. 5	1898	
					China–Russia border
0	21 (from border)	Grodekovo; Гродеково		1898	Far Eastern Railway
