= Fuyu–Nenjiang railway =

Railway line in Heilongjiang, China

Fuyu–Nenjiang railway or Funen railway (simplified Chinese: 富嫩铁路; traditional Chinese: 富嫩鐵路; pinyin: fùnèn tiělù), is a single-track railroad in northeastern China between Fuyu and Nenjiang in Heilongjiang Province. The line is 179.6 km (112 mi) long and was built between 1930 and 1937 and rebuilt in 1946. Major towns along route include Fuyu, Nehe, and Nenjiang.

== Line description ==
In the south, the Funen railway begins in Fuyu as a fork off of the Qiqihar–Bei'an railway. It proceeds northeast along the Nen River valley to Nehe and then to Nenjiang, where the Nenjiang–Greater Khingan Forest (Nenlin) railway heads northwest to Inner Mongolia and the Nenjiang–Heibaoshan railway branches northeast to Heibaoshan. In recent years, the Funen and Nenlin railroads have been collectively referred to as the Fuyu West (Fuxi) railway (富西铁路).

== History ==
Construction of the Fuyu-Nenjiang began in 1930 when northeastern China was ruled by the Republic of China. When the Fuyu to Laha section was completed in 1932, the region had fallen to Japan and was nominally ruled by Manchukuo. In August 1945, the Soviet Union entered World War II in the Pacific Theater and drove Japan from Manchuria. In April 1946, the retreating Soviet Red Army removed the rail line. In November of that year, the Chinese Communists' Northeast Regional Bureau mobilized 27,898 laborers and 14,311 wagons and had the line rebuilt. The line was originally called the Ningnian–Nenjiang railway and took on its current name after Ningnian (宁年) was renamed Fuyu.

== Rail connections ==
Nenjiang: Nenjiang–Greater Khingan Forest Railway
Fuyu: Qiqihar–Bei'an Railway

== See also ==
- List of railways in China
