= Taha railway station =

Railway station in Qiqihar, China

Coordinates: 47.5499°N 124.2251°E

Taha railway station is a railway station located in Taha Township, Fuyu County, Qiqihar, China on the Qiqihar–Bei'an railway. It was put in operation in January 1931.

Preceding station	China Railway	Following station
Fengtun towards Qiqihar	Qiqihar–Bei'an railway	Zhonghe towards Bei'an
