= Tongliao–Ranghulu railway =

Railway line in China

The Tongliao–Ranghulu railway or Tongrang Railway (simplified Chinese: 通让铁路; traditional Chinese: 通讓鐵路; pinyin: tōngràng tiělù), is a railroad in northeastern China, between Tongliao station in Inner Mongolia and Daqing West station (formerly Ranghulu station) on the Harbin–Manzhouli railway in Heilongjiang Province. The railway has a total length of 421 km (262 mi) and runs north-south from eastern Inner Mongolia through western Jilin Province to the oil fields of Daqing in western Heilongjiang. The line was built from 1964 to 1966. Major cities and towns along route include Tongliao, Da'an, and Daqing.

Electrification of the railway was completed in 2018.

== Rail connections ==
- Ranghulu (Daqing): Harbin–Manzhouli railway
- Taipingchuan: Siping–Qiqihar railway
- Tongliao: Beijing–Tongliao railway, Jining–Tongliao railway

== See also ==
- List of railways in China
- Rail transport in Inner Mongolia
