= Harbin–Qiqihar through train =

Railway service in Heilongjiang, China

The Harbin–Qiqihar through train (Chinese: 哈尔滨到齐齐哈尔动车组列车) is a Chinese railway running between the capital Harbin to Qiqihar express passenger trains by the Harbin Railway Bureau, Harbin passenger segment responsible for passenger transport task, Harbin originating on the Qiqihar train. CRH5 Type Passenger trains running along the Harbin–Qiqihar Intercity Railway across Heilongjiang provinces, the entire 288 km.

== Train trips ==
- D6901: Harbin West - Qiqihar South
- D6902: Qiqihar South - Harbin West
- D6903: Harbin - Qiqihar South
- D6904: Qiqihar South - Harbin West
- D6905: Harbin West - Qiqihar
- D6906: Qiqihar - Harbin
- D6907: Harbin - Qiqihar
- D6908: Qiqihar - Harbin West
- D7901: Harbin - Qiqihar
- D7902: Qiqihar - Harbin West
- D7903: Harbin - Qiqihar
- D7904: Qiqihar - Harbin West
- D7931: Harbin West - Qiqihar South
- D7932: Qiqihar South - Harbin
- D7933: Harbin West - Qiqihar South
- D7934: Qiqihar South - Harbin West
- D7935: Harbin West - Qiqihar
- D7936: Qiqihar South - Harbin West
- D7937: Harbin - Qiqihar South
- D7938: Qiqihar South - Harbin
- D7939: Harbin - Qiqihar South
- D7940: Qiqihar - Harbin
- D7941: Harbin - Qiqihar South
- D7942: Qiqihar South - Harbin West
- D7943: Harbin West - Qiqihar South
- D7944: Qiqihar South - Harbin
- D7945: Harbin - Qiqihar South
- D7946: Qiqihar South - Harbin
- D7947: Harbin West - Qiqihar South
- D7948: Qiqihar South - Harbin
- D7949: Harbin West - Qiqihar South
- D7950: Qiqihar South - Harbin
- D7951: Harbin West - Qiqihar South
- D7952: Qiqihar South - Harbin West
- D7953: Harbin - Qiqihar South
- D7954: Qiqihar South - Harbin
- D7955: Harbin - Qiqihar South
- D7956: Qiqihar South - Harbin
- D7957: Harbin - Qiqihar South
- D7958: Qiqihar South - Harbin
- D7959: Harbin - Qiqihar South
- D7960: Qiqihar South - Harbin West
- D7961: Harbin West - Qiqihar South
- D7962: Qiqihar South - Harbin West
- D7963: Harbin West - Qiqihar South
- D7964: Qiqihar South - Harbin West
- D7965: Harbin - Qiqihar South
- D7966: Qiqihar South - Harbin West

== See also ==
- K7015/7016 Harbin-Qiqihar Through Train
