= Zhaodong =

Place in Heilongjiang, China

Zhaodong 肇东市
- County-level city
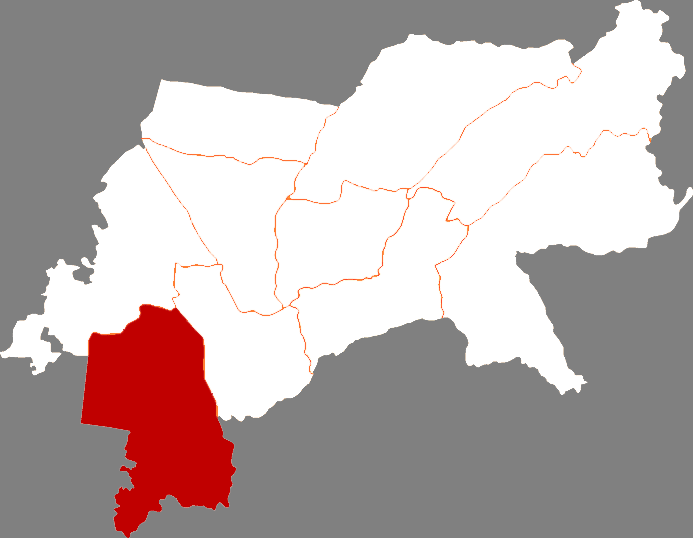

- Location in Heilongjiang
- Coordinates: 46°03′04″N 125°57′43″E
- Country: People's Republic of China
- Province: Heilongjiang
- Prefecture-level city: Suihua

Area
  - Total: 4,331.96 km^{2} (1,672.58 sq mi)

Population (2018)
  - Total: 859,001
  - Density: 198.294/km^{2} (513.579/sq mi)
- Time zone: UTC+8 (China Standard)
- Postal code: 151100
- Area code: 0455
- Climate: Dwa
- Website: Website

Zhaodong (simplified Chinese: 肇东; traditional Chinese: 肇東; pinyin: Zhàodōng) is a city in southwestern Heilongjiang province, China. It is the southernmost county-level division of the prefecture-level city of Suihua, the center of which is located around 100 kilometres (62 mi) to the northeast and around 60 kilometres (37 mi) northwest of Harbin, the provincial capital. It forms part of the Harbin-Changchun Megalopolis.

== Geography ==
Zhaodong lies near Songhua River to the south, being located in the central Songnen Plain.

== Administrative history ==
As part of Suihua, human settlement began in the Paleolithic era. The Sushen people were the most prevalent, but the south and southwestern areas that now make up modern-day Zhaodong, Mingshui, Qinggang, and Anda were also settled by the Yemaek through the Western Zhou and Western Han dynasty. During the Sui and Tang dynasties, the Mohe people lived in the area of modern-day Zhaodong. During the Liao dynasty, Zhaodong was part of Liaoyang Prefecture.

In 1130, Emperor Taizong of Jin ordered the construction of Bali as a military town around 3 kilometres (1.9 mi) southwest of modern-day Sizhan Town. The Balicheng ruins have since been classed as one of the Major National Historical and Cultural Sites in Heilongjiang. Mongols settled in Zhaodong in the 13th century, during the Yuan dynasty, initially as part of Kaiyuan Circuit controlled by Khasar. In 1295, the Zhaozhou Tuntian Wanhu Fu was established, with Bali as its seat. It was administered as part of Tashan Guard under the Nurgan Regional Military Commission during the Ming dynasty. The Gorlos Mongols became the primary inhabitants in 1425 and remained until the late Qing dynasty.

In 1908, Zhaodong Sub-prefecture was created from Zhaozhou Sub-prefecture. Zhaodong became an administrative bureau in November 1912, then a county in July 1914. Between 1898 and 1940, the namegiving settlement, Zhaodong, now an administrative town under the city, was known as Mangou (满沟), after the Mongols of Rear Gorlos Banner (Zhaoyuan), who used the area at Zhaodong as grazing fields, the name being popularized from the historic railway station of the same name. It also developed the nickname Tiancaogang (甜草岗; lit. 'Sweet grass hill') for the wild growing liquorice in the hillside.

Zhaodong was formed as a second-class county of Suihua in 1929 by the Northeastern Political Affairs Committee, following the abolishment of the circuit system. In July 1937, Zhaodong County government moved its headquarters from Changwu to Mangou, which prompted the name change in May 1940 to match the county. During the Chinese Civil War, Zhaodong was split off from Heilongjiang Province to become a directly administered county under Songjiang Province. With the establishment of the People's Republic of China in 1949, Zhaodong was returned to Heilongjiang.

In 1956, following the formation of Suihua Special District, the counties of Zhaodong, Zhaozhou, and Zhaoyuan were the only subdivisions formerly under Suihua to remain under direct provincial control. Zhaodong came under jurisdiction of Harbin in August 1958, then Songhuajiang Prefecture in May 1960. Between June 1965 and December 1982, Zhaodong County returned to administration under Suihua via different offices and committees before Suihua was reduced in jurisdiction to a county-level city. Zhaodong became a county-level city in September 1986 and became administered by Suihua again in 2000, when the latter was made a prefecture-level city.

== Economy ==
Grain production is widespread as a result of the fertile chernozem soil.

Due to its position between the larger cities Harbin and Daqing, Zhaodong has served a major railway hub of Northeast China since 1901, when Mangou station was constructed as part of the Chinese Eastern Railway. Following the Second Sino-Japanese War, Zhaodong became central to freight and later passenger transport to Harbin, with the modern Zhaodong railway station connecting to eight railways, including Harbin–Manzhouli railway and Harbin–Qiqihar intercity railway, as of 2022.

== Administrative divisions ==
Zhaodong City is divided into 4 subdistricts, 12 towns and 9 townships.

4 subdistricts

- Chaoyang (朝阳区街道), Dongsheng (东升区街道), Xiyuanqu (西园区街道), Zhengyangqu (豆沙镇)

12 towns

- Zhaodong (肇东镇), Changwu (昌五镇), Songzhan (宋站镇), Wuzhan (五站镇), Shangjia (尚家镇), Jiangjia (姜家镇), Limudian (里木店镇), Sizhan (四站镇), Laozhou (涝洲镇), Wuliming (五里明镇), Liming (黎明镇), Xibali (西八里镇)

9 townships

- Taiping (太平乡), Haicheng (海城乡), Xiangyang (向阳乡), Honghe (洪河乡), Yuejin (跃进乡), Dechang (德昌乡), Xuanhua (宣化乡), Anmin (安民乡), Mingjiu (明久乡)

== Climate ==
Climate data for Zhaodong, elevation 160 m (520 ft), (1991–2020 normals, extremes 1981–2010)
Month	Jan	Feb	Mar	Apr	May	Jun	Jul	Aug	Sep	Oct	Nov	Dec	Year
Record high °C (°F)	1.4 (34.5)	10.0 (50.0)	21.8 (71.2)	30.0 (86.0)	34.6 (94.3)	39.1 (102.4)	37.1 (98.8)	36.9 (98.4)	32.1 (89.8)	26.6 (79.9)	16.5 (61.7)	8.0 (46.4)	39.1 (102.4)
Mean daily maximum °C (°F)	−12.2 (10.0)	−6.1 (21.0)	3.2 (37.8)	13.9 (57.0)	21.8 (71.2)	26.6 (79.9)	28.2 (82.8)	26.7 (80.1)	21.6 (70.9)	12.5 (54.5)	−0.3 (31.5)	−10.2 (13.6)	10.5 (50.9)
Daily mean °C (°F)	−18.3 (−0.9)	−12.9 (8.8)	−3.1 (26.4)	7.4 (45.3)	15.5 (59.9)	21.1 (70.0)	23.5 (74.3)	21.6 (70.9)	15.4 (59.7)	6.2 (43.2)	−5.7 (21.7)	−15.7 (3.7)	4.6 (40.3)
Mean daily minimum °C (°F)	−23.7 (−10.7)	−19.1 (−2.4)	−9.3 (15.3)	0.8 (33.4)	8.9 (48.0)	15.5 (59.9)	18.9 (66.0)	16.9 (62.4)	9.5 (49.1)	0.6 (33.1)	−10.6 (12.9)	−20.7 (−5.3)	−1.0 (30.1)
Record low °C (°F)	−37.7 (−35.9)	−36.0 (−32.8)	−27.7 (−17.9)	−12.3 (9.9)	−3.5 (25.7)	3.9 (39.0)	8.2 (46.8)	7.0 (44.6)	−4.0 (24.8)	−15.6 (3.9)	−27.0 (−16.6)	−35.9 (−32.6)	−37.7 (−35.9)
Average precipitation mm (inches)	2.7 (0.11)	3.1 (0.12)	8.4 (0.33)	15.8 (0.62)	46.3 (1.82)	100.1 (3.94)	140.9 (5.55)	103.4 (4.07)	52.0 (2.05)	18.0 (0.71)	7.9 (0.31)	5.4 (0.21)	504 (19.84)
Average precipitation days (≥ 0.1 mm)	4.1	3.0	4.3	5.8	10.3	13.0	13.8	12.3	8.7	5.6	4.5	5.4	90.8
Average snowy days	5.5	3.9	5.3	2.0	0	0	0	0	0	1.6	5.3	7.1	30.7
Average relative humidity (%)	70	64	54	48	52	65	78	79	70	63	65	71	65
Mean monthly sunshine hours	174.8	201.0	238.5	231.2	252.6	252.4	237.0	228.7	232.4	203.5	161.4	154.2	2,567.7
Percentage possible sunshine	62	68	64	57	54	54	50	53	63	61	58	58	59
Source: China Meteorological Administration

== 1995 shooting ==
On the night of 18 November 1995, a mass shooting occurred in several villages under Zhaodong's Sizhan Town. Two residents, 26-year-old Feng Wanhai (冯万海) and 22-year-old Jiang Liming (姜立明), armed with a double-barreled shotgun and a small-bore rifle, opened fire at 48 people, killing 32 people and wounding 16 others. 37 families were affected by the incident, dubbed the "Sizhan Town 11.18 shooting murder case" (四站镇11.18特大持枪杀人案).

Sizhan Town (四站镇) residents Xiao Hongwei (肖洪伟) and Bai Huichen (白会臣) and their family members (seven people in total) were all killed. The suspects also stole a Type 77 pistol and four Beijing Jeeps. They first drove through Sizhan and opened fire before speeding off to Wuliming Town (五里明镇), located about 30 km northeast of Sizhan. Later, they drove to Xibali Village (西八里乡), located 12 km west of Sizhan, in search of people or "targets", but did not find any. They then drove towards Dechang Village (德昌乡), located north of Sizhan, and stopped at a "Tiancai Stop" (甜菜站) along the way looking for people but being unable to find anyone. In order to "do something on a large-scale and let the whole world know" (as described by Jiang, one of the suspects), the two suspects drove around the towns and villages surrounding Sizhan searching for their next "targets".

The incident came to the attention of all levels in the Chinese government and security agencies. In Heilongjiang, Secretary of the Provincial Party Committee Yue Qifeng, Provincial Governor Tian Fengshan, Vice Provincial Governor Yang Zhihai (杨志海), and others, made serious comments about the incident.

The Assistant to the Provincial Governor, the Deputy Secretary of the Provincial Party Committee, and Head of Public Security Department Xu Yandong (徐衍东) urged the Suihua Administrative Office and the Zhaodong Public Security Department to arrest the suspects at all costs. Deputy Head of Public Security Department Chen Yongcai (陈永才), Head of Criminal Investigation Department Sun Bangnan (孙邦男), Deputy Head of Criminal Investigation Department Yan Zizhong (闫子忠), and Head of Criminal Technology Department Che Deren (车德仁) led 16 others to the scene to investigate the case. Security agencies all around the country responded quickly and deployed their forces to assist in arresting the suspects.

Later that night, at 9:40 pm, Feng was shot dead by security forces. Jiang was injured and eventually committed suicide by shooting himself after being cornered. It is one of the deadliest rampage killings in modern history and the deadliest mass shooting in Chinese history.

== Notable people ==
- Liang Wenbo, snooker player
- Wang Guanzhong, People's Liberation Army general
