= Fengtun railway station =

Railway station in Heilongjiang, China

Coordinates: 47.4624°N 124.1231°E

Fengtun railway station is a railway station located in Hata Township, Fuyu County, Harbin, Heilongjiang on the Qiqihar–Bei'an railway. The station was put into operation in January 1931.

Preceding station	China Railway	Following station
Gaotou towards Qiqihar	Qiqihar–Bei'an railway	Taha towards Bei'an
