= Aotou–Changtingzhen railway =

Railway line in People's Republic of China

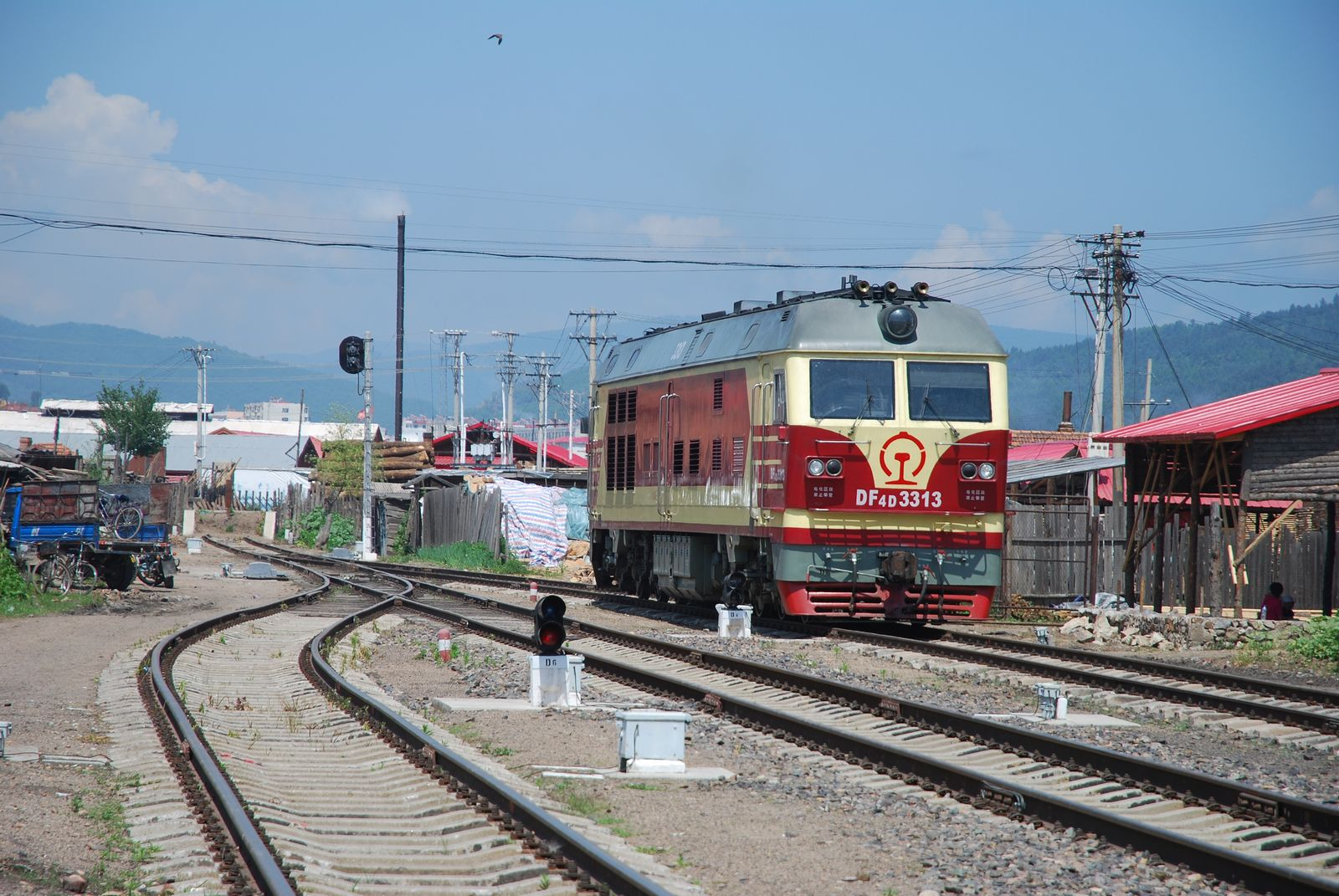
A locomotive at Changtingzhen, the terminus of the branch

The Aotou–Changtingzhen railway or Huolonggou railway is a railway line in Hailin, Mudanjiang, Heilongjiang, China. It is a branch from the Harbin–Suifenhe railway.

There is one daily morning service from the terminus of the branch, Changtingzhen, to Mudanjiang railway station and one daily evening service from Mudanjiang to Changtingzhen. The line is also used for freight.
