= Hongqiying East railway station =

Railway station in China

Coordinates: 47°5′6.29″N 123°58′53.36″E

Hongqiying East station (紅旗營東站) is a high-speed railway station of Harbin–Qiqihar Intercity Railway and located in Heilongjiang, China. As of 2018, it did not offer a passenger service.
