= Harbin–Yichun high-speed railway =

Railway line in Heilongjiang, China

Overview
- Native name: 哈伊高铁
- Status: In operation
- Locale: Heilongjiang
- Termini: Harbin North; Yichun West
- Stations: 9

Service
- Type: High-speed rail
- Operator: China Railway High-speed

History
- Opened: 28 September 2026; 4 days ago

Technical
- Line length: 300 km (186 mi)
- Track gauge: 1,435 mm (4 ft 8 1/2 in) standard gauge
- Operating speed: 250 km/h (155 mph)

The Harbin–Yichun high-speed railway is a high-speed railway line in Heilongjiang, China.

== History ==
Construction started on May 13, 2021 and the railway line officially began operations on September 28, 2026.

== Route ==
The line is 300 kilometres (190 mi) long and has a maximum speed limit of 250 kilometres per hour (160 mph). It will reduce the travel time between Harbin and Yichun from over seven hours to 100 minutes.

=== Stations ===
Station Name	Chinese	Metro transfers/connections
Harbin	哈尔滨	2
Harbin North	哈尔滨北	2
Hulan North	呼兰北	
Xinglongzhen West	兴隆镇西	
Suihua South	绥化南	
Qing'an South	庆安南	
Tieli	铁力	
Riyuexia	日月峡	
Yichun West	伊春西	
