= Manzhouli railway station =

Railway station in Manzhouli, China

Manzhouli 满洲里
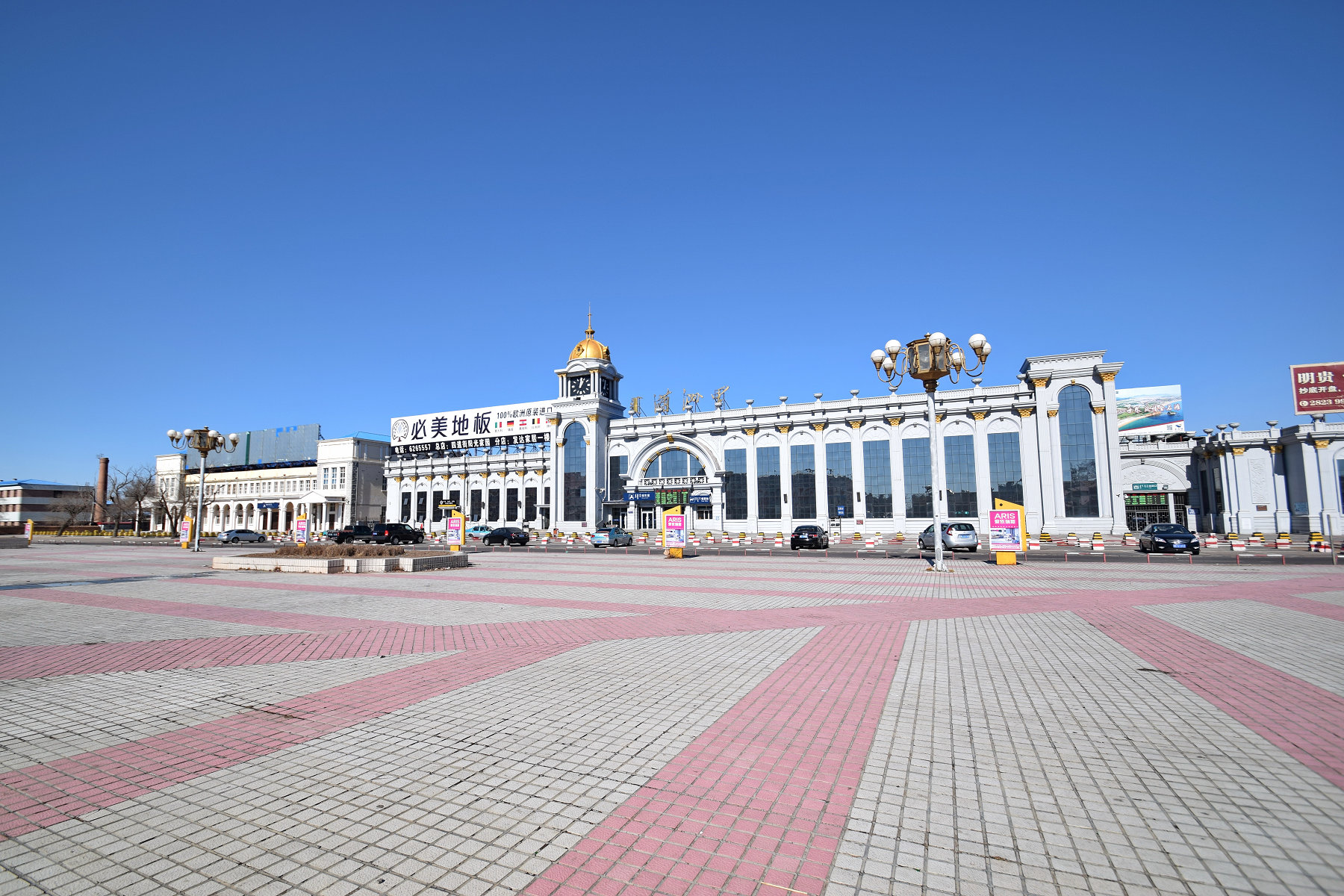
- Manzhouli railway station

General information
- Location: Manzhouli, Hulunbuir, Inner Mongolia; China
- Coordinates: 49.583°N 117.442°E
- Operated by: China Railway Harbin Group
- Line: Harbin–Manzhouli Railway
- Platforms: 2

Other information
- Station code: 57872 (TMIS); MLX (telegram)

History
- Previous names: Manchzhuriya (Russian)
Location

Manzhouli railway station (simplified Chinese: 满洲里站; traditional Chinese: 滿洲里站; pinyin: Mǎnzhōulǐ Zhàn), formerly known as Manchzhuriya station (Станция Маньчжурия / Stantsiya Man'chzhuriya) in Russian, is a railway station in Manzhouli, Hulunbuir, Inner Mongolia, China. It is managed by the China Railway Harbin Group, and as one of the stations of Harbin–Manzhouli Railway.

Manzhouli is the China's main rail gateway to Russia. The station on the opposite, Russian, side of the border, is Zabaikalsk.

In 2022, an expansion to the freight portion of the station was completed.

== Around the station ==
=== North ===
- Honglin Supermarket (鸿林超市; 鴻林超市)
- Hongli Convenience Supermarket (鸿利平价超市; 鴻利平價超市)
- Baifang Shopping Center (白房购物商场; 白房購物商場)
- South District Hospital (南区医院; 南區醫院)
- Manzhouli Museum (满洲里市博物馆; 滿州里市博物館)

=== South ===
- Manzhouli Friendship Hotel (友谊宾馆; 友誼賓館)
- Manzhouli Pearl Hotel (满洲里明珠饭店; 滿州里明珠飯店)
- Manzhouli Social Insurance Bureau (满洲里社会保险局; 滿州里市社會保險局)
- The Second Branch of Electronic Business Hotel (电力商务大酒店二部; 電力商務大酒店二部)
- The Local people's court of Manzhouli (满洲里人民法院; 滿州里市人民法院)
- Victoria Business Plaza (维多利亚商业广场; 維多利亞商業廣場)
- Henglong Shopping Center (恆隆商场; 恆隆商場)

Preceding station	China Railway	Following station
Lubin towards Harbin	Harbin–Manzhouli railway	Zabaykalsk Terminus
