= Yichun West railway station =

Railway station in Yichun, Heilongjiang

Yichun West 伊春西

General information
- Location: Yichun, Heilongjiang; China
- Line: Harbin–Yichun high-speed railway

History
- Opened: September 28, 2026
Location

Yichun West railway station (Chinese: 伊春西) is a railway station in Yichun, Heilongjiang, China. It is the northern terminus of the Harbin–Yichun high-speed railway.

Construction officially began on 24 August 2022. Upon its opening in September 2026, it became the most northerly high-speed railway station in China and the first high-speed rail station constructed in a permafrost region.
