= Nenjiang–Greater Khingan Forest railway =

Railway line in China

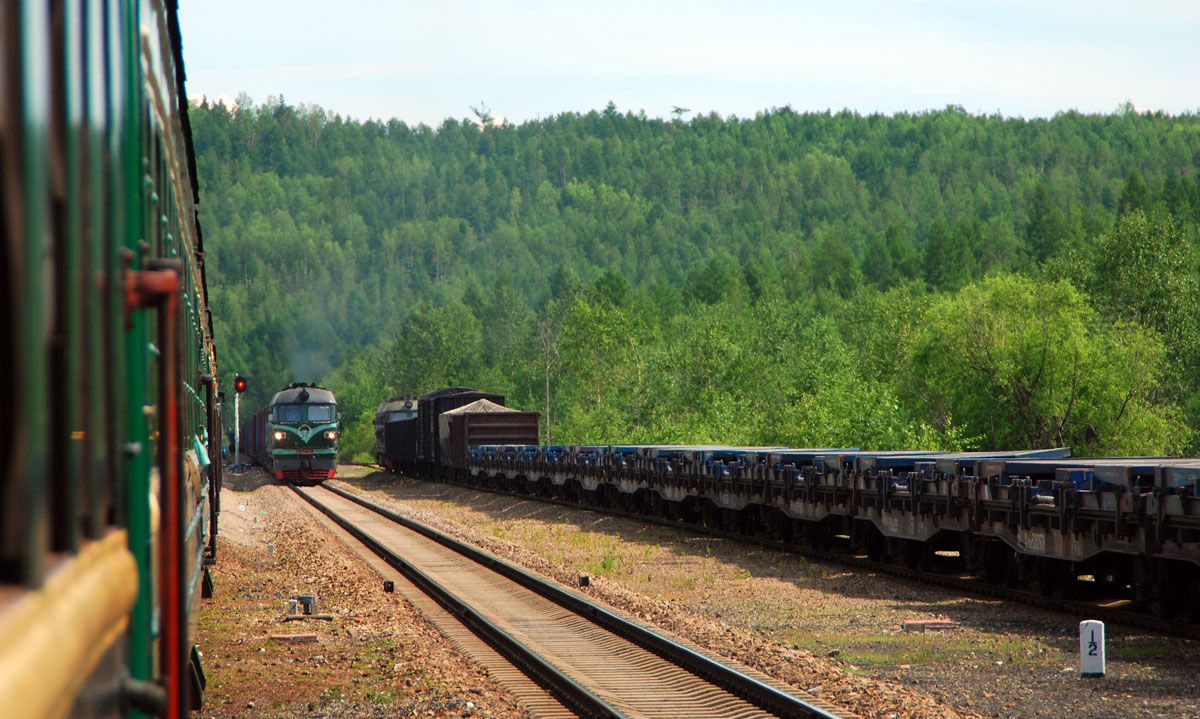
Tayuan station on the Nenlin railway in the Daxing'anling Prefecture of Heilongjiang Province

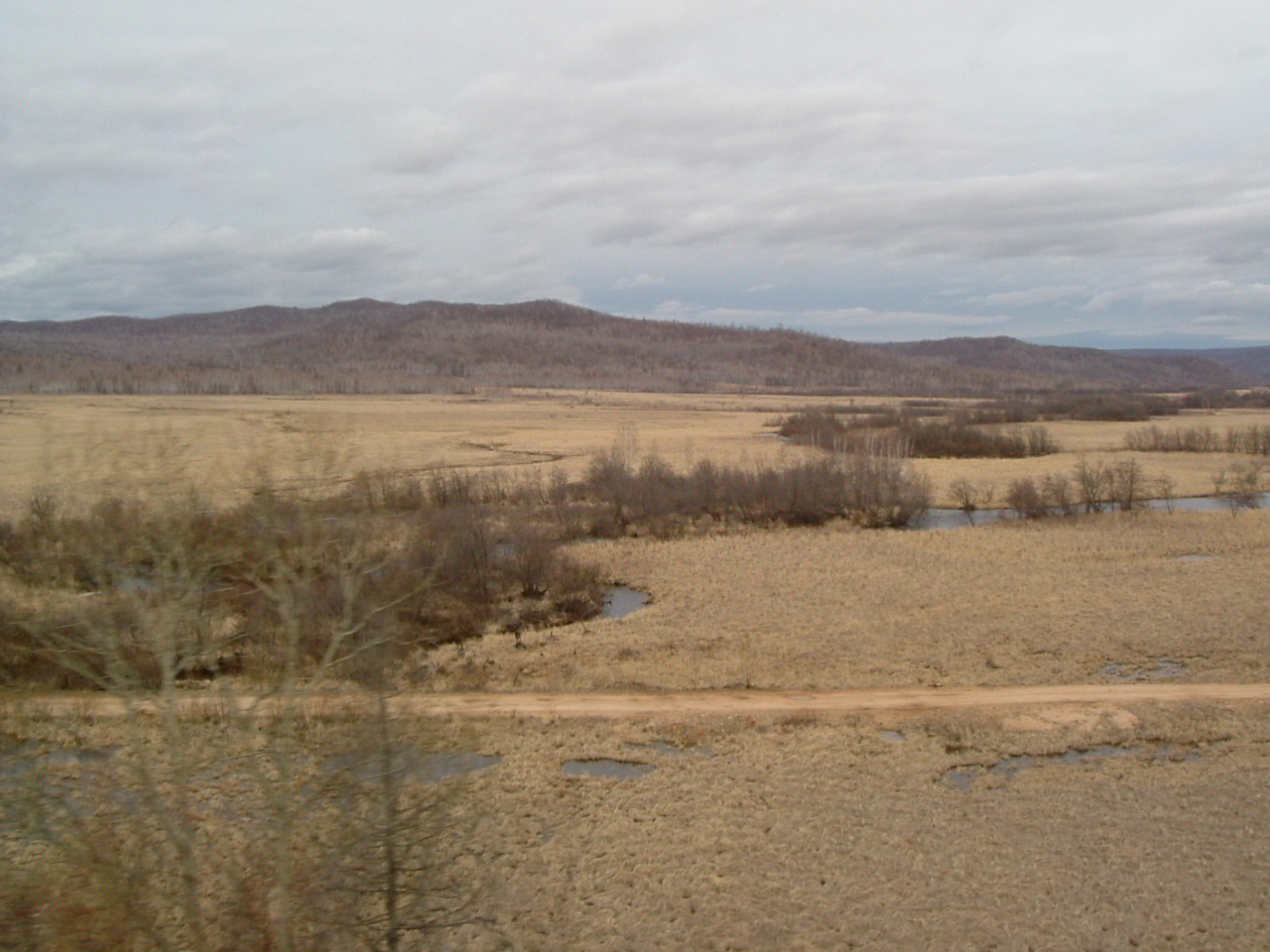
The Nenlin Railway train runs along the Nen River (May 2005)

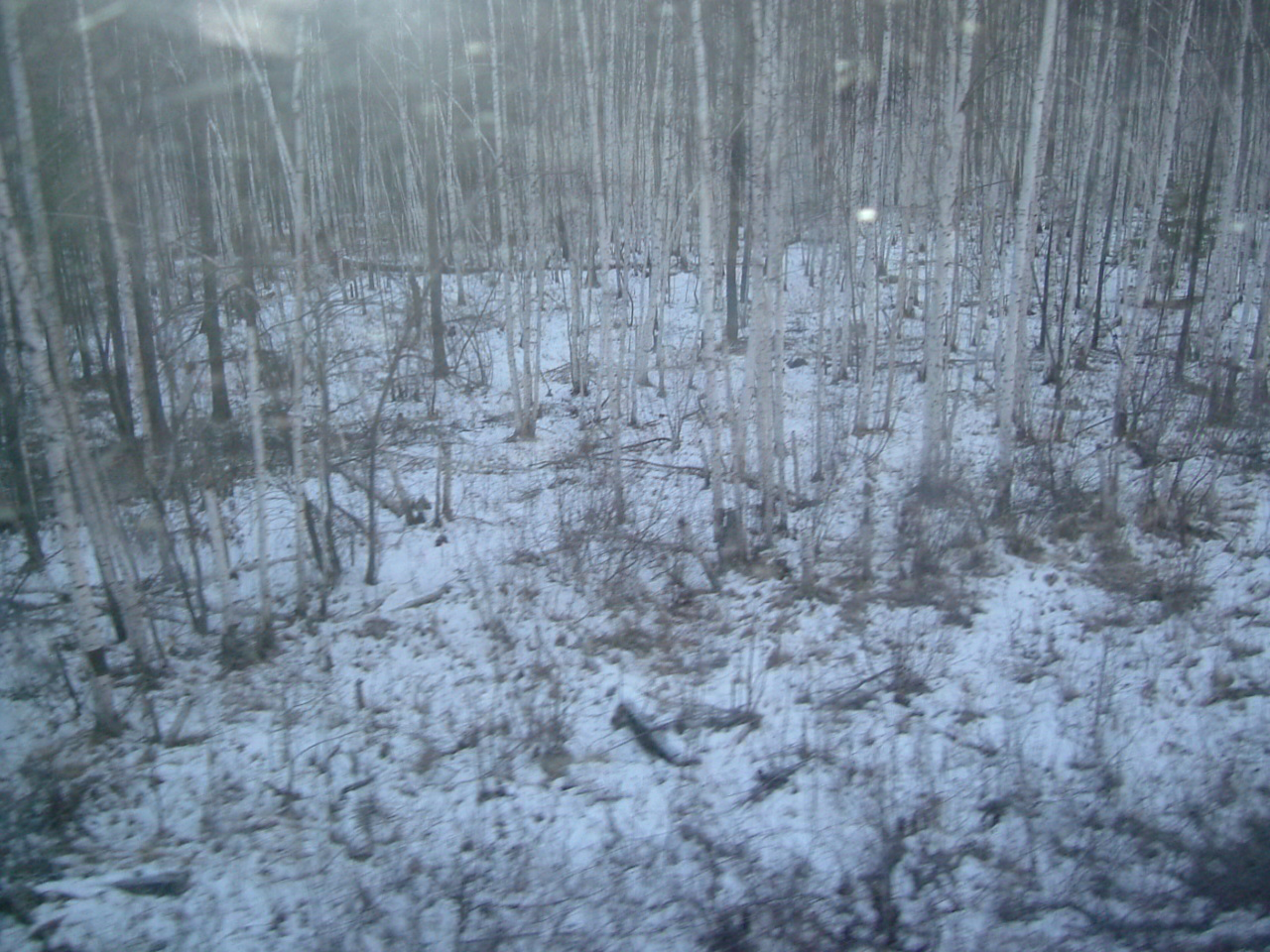
The Greater Khingan Mountains forest along the Nenlin Railway (May 2005)

Nenjiang–Greater Khingan Forest railway or Nenlin railway (simplified Chinese: 嫩林铁路; traditional Chinese: 嫩林鐵路; pinyin: nènlín tiělù), is a single-track railroad in northeastern China between Nenjiang and the town of Gulian, in Mohe County. It is also known as the Nenjiang–Mohe railway or Nenmo railway (嫩漠铁路). Both of the railway's terminals are located in Heilongjiang Province. In between, the line traverses the Greater Khingan range of Inner Mongolia. Much of the line is located within the jurisdiction of the Greater Khingan Forest District, a special forestry prefecture that covers parts of both Inner Mongolia and Heilongjiang.

The line has a total length of 667 km (414 mi). It was built and completed in four sections from 1964 to 1972. Major cities and towns along route include Nenjiang, Jiagedaqi, the prefectural seat, and Mohe, the northernmost county in China.

== Line Description ==
In the south, the Nenlin railway begins in Nenjiang on the eastern bank of the Nen River. After crossing the river, the line enters Hulunbuir, a prefectural city and formerly a League of Inner Mongolia. The line heads north and gradually climbs into the Greater Khingan Range. After following the Gan River to Jiagedaqi, the railroad turns north and reenters Heilongjiang at Tayuan. It turns northwest at Tahe and follows the panhandle to Mohe, the northernmost county in China. In the north, the line terminates at Gulian, a town just west of Mohe's county seat.

At Nenjiang, the line intersects with the Fuyu–Nenjiang (Funen) and Nenjiang–Heishanbao railways. In recent year, the Nenlin and Funen railroads have been collectively referred to as the Fuyu - Xilinji railway (富西铁路).

== History ==
The Nenjiang–Greater Khingan Forest railway was built by the People's Liberation Army's Corps of Engineers. Construction began in 1964. The Jiagedaqi to Tahe section was the first to open, in 1966, followed by the Jiagedaqi to Nenjiang section in 1967. The Tahe to Zhangling section followed in 1968 and the northernmost section from Tahe to Gulian opened in 1972. In all, 156 soldiers lost their lives during the construction. They are buried in martyr's cemeteries in Jiagedaqi and Tahe.

== Rail connections ==
- Nenjiang: Fuyu–Nenjiang railway

== See also ==
- List of railways in China
- Rail transport in Inner Mongolia
