= Gaotou railway station =

Railway station in Heilongjiang, China

Coordinates: 47.4111°N 124.0644°E

Gaotou railway station (Chinese: 高头站) is a fourth-class railway station in Gaotou Village, Jianhua District, Qiqihar, Heilongjiang located on the Qiqihar–Bei'an railway. It was put into operation in January 1931.

Preceding station	China Railway	Following station
Qiqihar Terminus	Qiqihar–Bei'an railway	Fengtun towards Bei'an
