= Laha, Heilongjiang =

Laha 拉哈
- Town
- 拉哈镇
- Location within Heilongjiang Location within China
- Coordinates: 48°12′15″N 124°36′43″E
- Country: China
- Province: Heilongjiang
- Prefecture-level city: Qiqihar
- County-level city: Nehe City
- Elevation: 192 m (630 ft)
- Time zone: UTC+8 (China Standard)
- Postal code: 230281101

Laha (Chinese: 拉哈; pinyin: Lāhā) is a town of Nehe City in western Heilongjiang province, Northeast China. It is located on the Nen River 108 kilometres (67 mi) north-northeast of the city of Qiqihar (the second largest city in the province) and 37 kilometres (23 mi) southwest of Nehe City. There are 5 communities and 2 villages under the town's administration.
