= Nehe =

Nehe 讷河市
- County-level city
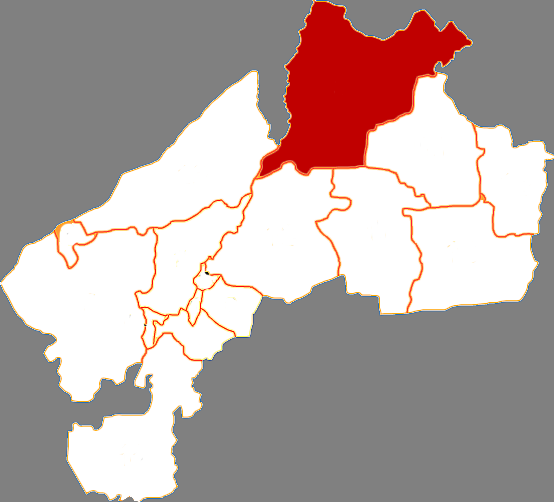
- Location of Nehe in Qiqihar

- Location within Heilongjiang
- Coordinates: 48°29′N 124°53′E
- Country: People's Republic of China
- Province: Heilongjiang
- Prefecture-level city: Qiqihar

Area
  - Total: 6,664 km^{2} (2,573 sq mi)
- Elevation: 203 m (666 ft)

Population (2019)
  - Total: 677,559
  - Density: 101.7/km^{2} (263.3/sq mi)
- Time zone: UTC+8 (China Standard)
- Postal code: 161300
- Climate: Dwb

Nehe (simplified Chinese: 讷河; traditional Chinese: 訥河; pinyin: Nèhé) is a county-level city of western Heilongjiang in Northeast China, It is located near the border with Inner Mongolia to the west and is under the administration of Qiqihar City, 144 kilometres (89 mi) to the south-southwest.

== Administrative divisions ==
Nehe City is divided into 2 subdistricts, 11 towns, 3 townships and 1 ethnic township.

2 subdistricts

- Yuting (雨亭街道), Tongjiang (通江街道)

11 towns

- Laha (拉哈镇), Erkeqian (二克浅镇), Xuetian (学田镇), Longhe (龙河镇), Nenan (讷南镇), Liuhe (六合镇), Zhangfa (长发镇), Tongnan (通南镇), Tongyi (同义镇), Jiujing (九井镇), Laolai (老莱镇)

3 townships

- Kongguo (孔国乡), Hesheng (和盛乡), Tongxin (同心乡)

1 ethnic township

- Xingwang Ewenki (兴旺鄂温克族乡)

== Climate ==
Climate data for Nehe, elevation 231 m (758 ft), (1991–2020 normals, extremes 1981–2010)
Month	Jan	Feb	Mar	Apr	May	Jun	Jul	Aug	Sep	Oct	Nov	Dec	Year
Record high °C (°F)	−1.3 (29.7)	8.8 (47.8)	19.5 (67.1)	28.1 (82.6)	35.7 (96.3)	39.9 (103.8)	37.0 (98.6)	35.2 (95.4)	34.0 (93.2)	26.2 (79.2)	13.5 (56.3)	3.3 (37.9)	39.9 (103.8)
Mean daily maximum °C (°F)	−15.0 (5.0)	−8.9 (16.0)	0.9 (33.6)	12.3 (54.1)	20.8 (69.4)	26.2 (79.2)	27.8 (82.0)	25.6 (78.1)	20.1 (68.2)	10.4 (50.7)	−3.1 (26.4)	−13.5 (7.7)	8.6 (47.5)
Daily mean °C (°F)	−21.3 (−6.3)	−16.2 (2.8)	−5.6 (21.9)	5.9 (42.6)	14.3 (57.7)	20.3 (68.5)	22.7 (72.9)	20.3 (68.5)	13.7 (56.7)	4.3 (39.7)	−8.5 (16.7)	−19.0 (−2.2)	2.6 (36.6)
Mean daily minimum °C (°F)	−26.7 (−16.1)	−23.0 (−9.4)	−12.3 (9.9)	−0.8 (30.6)	7.4 (45.3)	14.3 (57.7)	17.7 (63.9)	15.3 (59.5)	7.9 (46.2)	−1.0 (30.2)	−13.4 (7.9)	−23.9 (−11.0)	−3.2 (26.2)
Record low °C (°F)	−41.9 (−43.4)	−40.4 (−40.7)	−30.8 (−23.4)	−13.5 (7.7)	−6.2 (20.8)	0.8 (33.4)	7.4 (45.3)	5.5 (41.9)	−5.3 (22.5)	−20.7 (−5.3)	−32.8 (−27.0)	−38.5 (−37.3)	−41.9 (−43.4)
Average precipitation mm (inches)	3.6 (0.14)	3.3 (0.13)	7.1 (0.28)	17.0 (0.67)	36.6 (1.44)	91.3 (3.59)	142.5 (5.61)	109.7 (4.32)	58.8 (2.31)	21.5 (0.85)	6.8 (0.27)	6.1 (0.24)	504.3 (19.85)
Average precipitation days (≥ 0.1 mm)	5.1	3.3	4.3	5.5	9.1	12.3	14.2	12.7	9.3	6.2	5.2	6.8	94
Average snowy days	6.7	5.1	6.0	3.1	0.2	0	0	0	0	2.4	6.6	8.7	38.8
Average relative humidity (%)	71	68	58	48	48	63	75	77	68	60	66	72	65
Mean monthly sunshine hours	180.2	207.7	255.7	244.8	260.9	254.7	243.1	239.1	235.7	210.3	174.2	159.0	2,665.4
Percentage possible sunshine	66	72	69	59	55	53	51	55	63	64	64	62	61
Source: China Meteorological Administration
