= Qiqihar South railway station =

Railway station in China

Coordinates: 47.2825°N 123.9644°E

Qiqiharnan 齐齐哈尔南
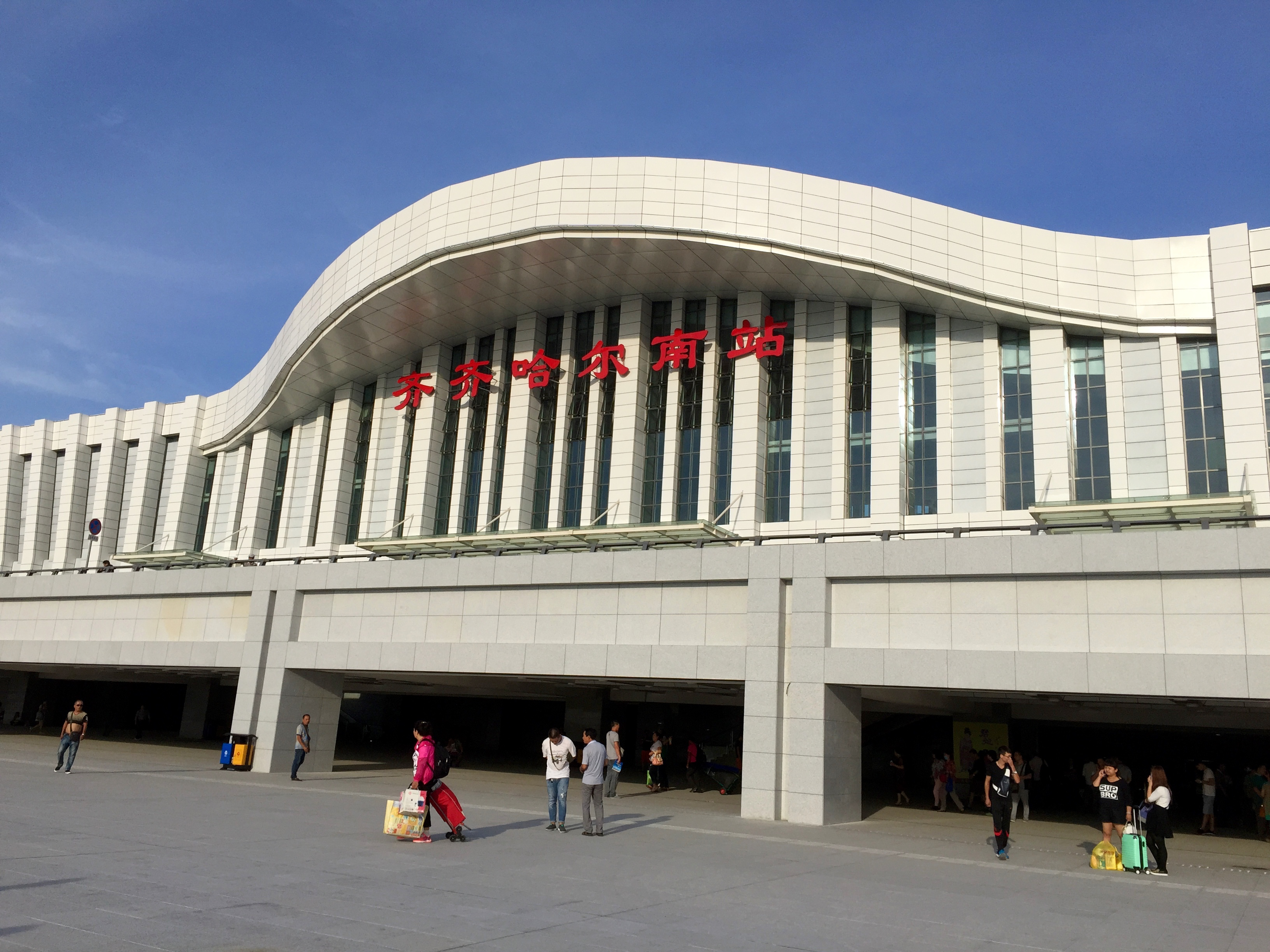
- Qiqihar South railway station

General information
- Other names: High-speed South railway station
- Location: Longsha District, Qiqihar, Heilongjiang; China
- Operated by: Harbin Railway Bureau, China Railway Corporation
- Line: Harbin–Qiqihar Intercity Railway
- Platforms: 12 (Platforms 10-12 are reserved)
- Connections: Bus terminal, Trains from Qiqihar Station.

Qiqiharnan South station (齐齐哈尔南站) is a railway station of the Harbin–Qiqihar Intercity Railway and located in Longsha District, Qiqihar, Heilongjiang, China. It is 6.5 km from central Qiqihar Railway Station and 282 km from the provincial capital of Harbin. It is divided into high-speed (Platforms 1–9) and conventional rail sections (Platforms 10-12 are reserved).Construction was started on July 5, 2013.

== Station layout ==
Qiqihar South Railway Station has a building area of 67,962 square metres, of which 29,957 square meters is for the waiting hall. The design of the station follows modern Chinese practice for high-speed railway stations with an underground arrivals floor, ground floor (platform level), with passengers going up to a large waiting hall spanning above across all the platforms. It is designed to handle 6,000 people arriving and departing at any one time.

== See also ==
- Qiqihar railway station

Preceding station	China Railway High-speed	Following station
Hongqiying East towards Harbin	Harbin–Qiqihar intercity railway	Qiqihar Terminus
