= Ranghulu District =

Ranghulu District 让胡路区
- District
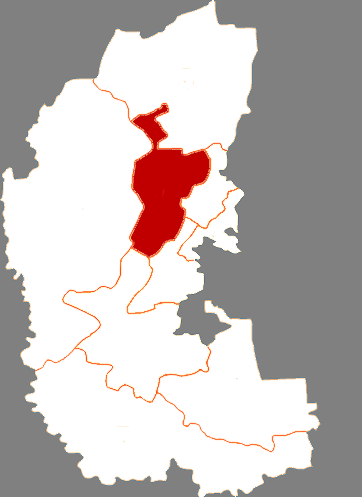
- Ranghulu in Daqing

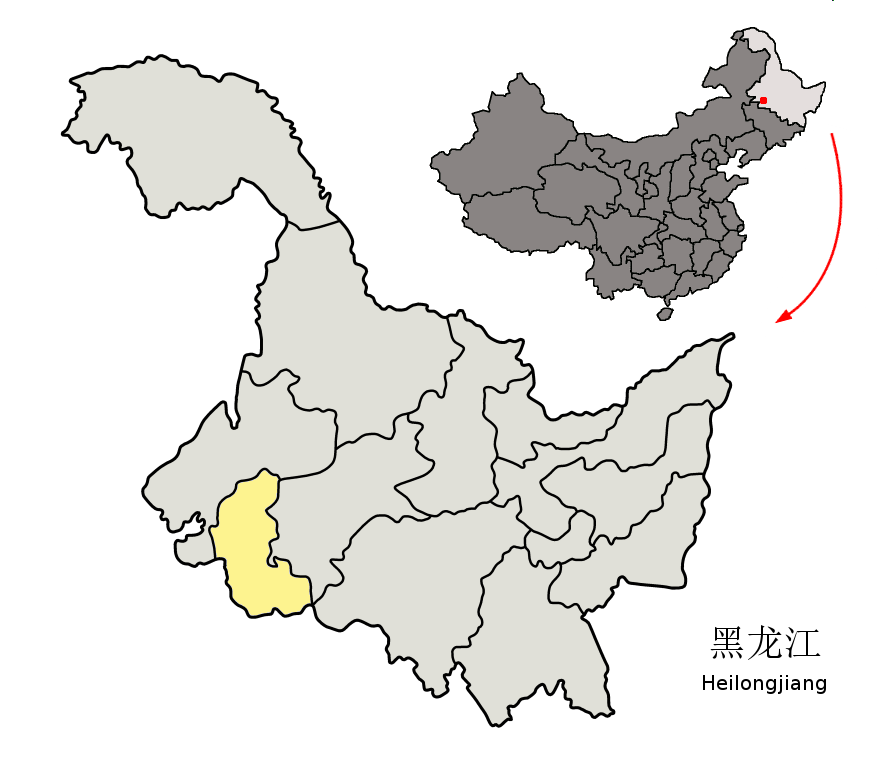
- Daqing in Heilongjiang
- Coordinates: 46°39′09″N 124°52′14″E
- Country: People's Republic of China
- Province: Heilongjiang
- Prefecture-level city: Daqing

Area
  - Total: 1,394 km^{2} (538 sq mi)

Population (2018)
  - Total: 480,857
  - Density: 344.9/km^{2} (893.4/sq mi)
- Time zone: UTC+8 (China Standard)

Ranghulu District (simplified Chinese: 让胡路区; traditional Chinese: 讓胡路區; pinyin: Rànghúlù Qū) is a district of Daqing, Heilongjiang province, China.

Schools in the district include Daqing No.1 Middle School.

== Administrative divisions ==
Ranghulu District is divided into 6 subdistricts and 1 township.

6 subdistricts

- Longgang (龙岗街道), Yinlang (银浪街道), Fendou (奋斗街道), Qingxin (庆新街道), Xibin (西宾街道), Chengfeng (乘风街道)

1 town

- Lamadian (喇嘛甸镇)
