= Harbin–Manzhouli railway =

Railway line in Northeast China

Trans-Siberian Harbin–Manzhouli railway
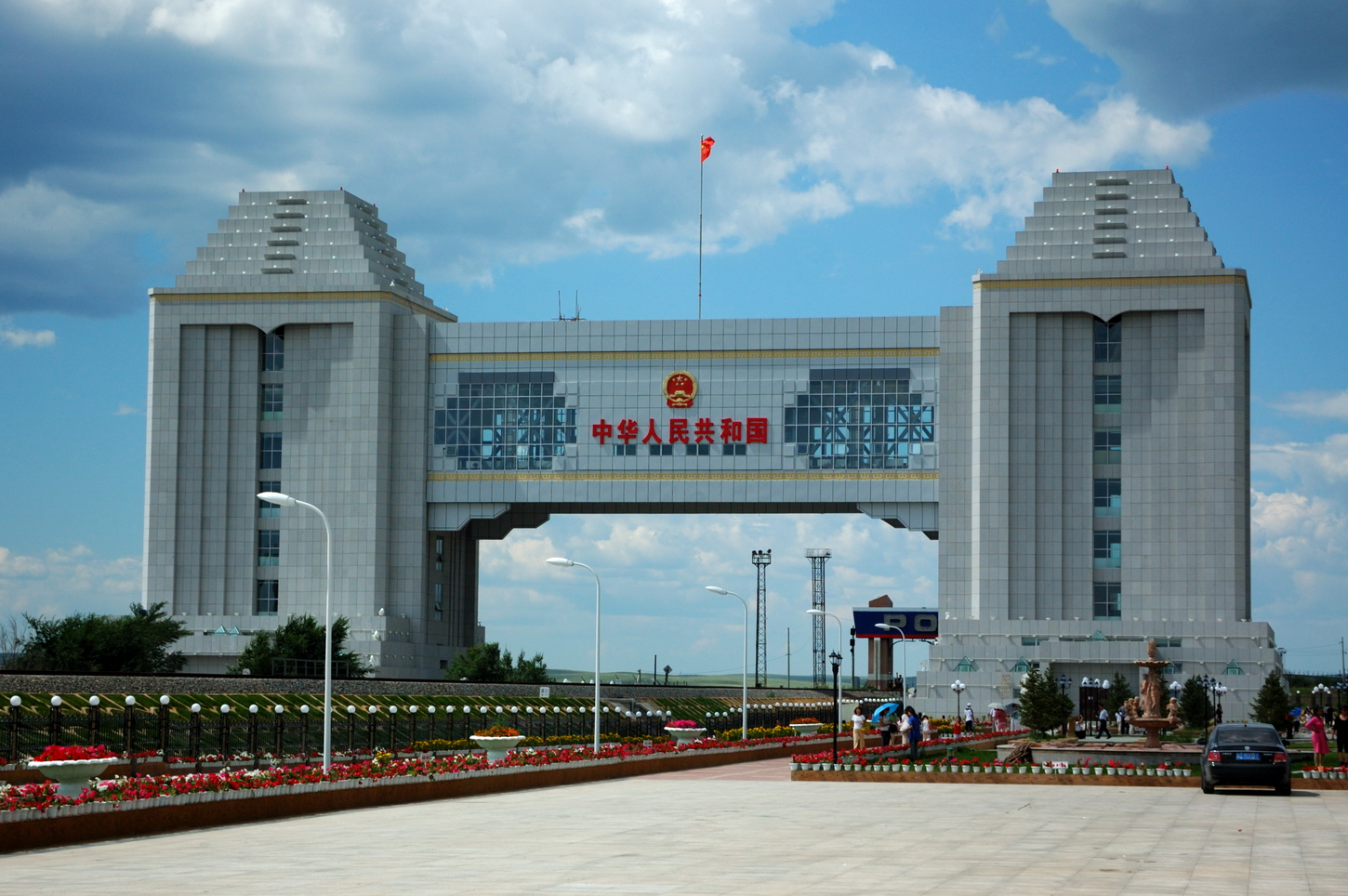
- Sino-Russian border crossing at Manzhouli.

Overview
- Native name: 滨洲铁路 (Bīnzhōu Tiělù)
- Status: Operational
- Owner: Chinese Eastern Railway (1902–1932); North Manchuria Railway (1932–1935); Manchukuo National Railway (1935–1945); China Changchun Railway (1945–1955); China Railway (since 1955)
- Locale: Heilongjiang, Inner Mongolia
- Termini: Harbin; Manzhouli
- Stations: 102

Service
- Type: Heavy rail, Regional rail
- Operator: China Railway Harbin Group

History
- Opened: 14 January 1902

Technical
- Line length: 935 km (581 mi)
- Track gauge: 1,435 mm (4 ft 8 1/2 in) standard gauge
- Old gauge: 1,520 mm (4 ft 11 27/32 in) Russian gauge
- Electrification: 25 kV 50 Hz AC overhead line Harbin-Manzhouli & Zabaikalsk-Karymskaya Section

Trans-Siberian Railway Harbin–Manzhouli railway, abbreviated as the Binzhou Railway (Chinese: 滨洲铁路; pinyin: Bīnzhōu tiělù), is a double-track electrified trunk railway in Northeast China between Harbin and Manzhouli on the Russian border, where it connects to the Trans-Siberian Railway via Zabaikalsk, Russia.

The Binzhou railway begins in the west at Manzhouli and runs eastward across the Hulunbuir grasslands, through the forests of the Greater Khingan range, the oilfields of Daqing, and the rich farmland of the Songhua River valley to Harbin. Major cities and towns along route include Manzhouli, Jalainur, Hailar, Dayan, Yakeshi, and Zhalantun in Inner Mongolia, as well as Qiqihar, Daqing, Anda, Zhaodong, and Harbin in Heilongjiang.

This line has the only station in all of China whose name is a single character: Song railway station (宋), which makes it a popular location amongst Chinese railfans.

== History ==
The Qing government's special envoy Li Hongzhang went to Russia to congratulate Tsar Nicholas II on his coronation, and signed the Sino–Russian Secret Treaty on June 3, 1896; amongst other things, this treaty gave Russia the right to build a railway through northeast China - the Chinese Eastern Railway (CER). Harbin was selected to be the hub of the new railway system, with three Russian-gauge lines 1,520 mm (5 ft 0 in) envisioned heading east, west, and south from Harbin. Work on the western branch from Harbin to the Russian border at Manzhouli, then named the Haman Railway, commenced at both ends in June 1898, and was completed in 1902. The eastern branch of the CER ran from Harbin to Suifenhe. The entire CER served as an alternative route to the Trans-Siberian Railway.

The CER was a joint project of China and Russia, and after the Russo-Japanese War, the Japanese took over the southern portion of the CER, forming the South Manchuria Railway, with the northern portions remaining under Sino-Russian control. Following the October Revolution, the railway was controlled by White Russians for a time during the Russian Civil War, but from 1917 the government of the Republic of China began taking more control of the railway to itself, until in 1922 the CER was made officially a Sino-Soviet joint enterprise. However, in 1929 the Chinese seized complete control of the CER, storming the Soviet consulate in Harbin and arresting the officials of the CER. This led to the Sino-Soviet conflict of 1929, in which the Soviets quickly defeated the Chinese army and forced the Chinese to once again accept joint control of the railway. After the Mukden Incident, the Soviets retained control over the railway despite the Japanese occupation of northeastern China; after the establishment of Manchukuo in 1932, the CER became a joint Soviet-Manchukuo enterprise called the "North Manchuria Railway". In March 1935, the government of Manchukuo bought the Soviet share of the NMR for 140 million yen, and the entire network was taken over by the Manchukuo National Railway.

After the Manchukuo National took over the NMR network, it changed the name of the Harbin–Manzhouli railway from Haman Railway to Binzhou Line, and on 1 August 1936, conversion of the line from Russian broad gauge to standard gauge was completed, increasing the operating speed to 60 km/h (37 mph).

After the Soviet invasion of Manchuria and the subsequent collapse of Manchukuo, the Soviets once again took control of the region's railways, and converted the Binzhou Line back to Russian gauge; in 1946, the Northeast Democratic Coalition seized control of the line, and once again regauged it. After the creation of the People's Republic of China, the railways in the territory of the former Manchukuo were taken over by a new Sino-Soviet joint enterprise, called the China Changchun Railway. Full control of the China Changchun Railway was to be turned over to the PRC on 31 December 1952, but due to the Korean War this was delayed until 1955. The Harbin–Manzhouli line became part of China Railway at that time, and once again renamed, becoming the Binzhou Railway.

The Harbin-Manzhouli line has undergone substantial upgrades over the years. Double-tracking began in 1983, with the Harbin–Anda section being the first section to be completed, in 1985; the entire line was completed in 2007, when the Manzhouli–Hailar section was completed, increasing the line's capacity sixfold. In 1990, semi-automatic train control was introduced, with DFH3-class diesel locomotives on passenger trains, and DF4B-class diesels and Renmin-class steam locomotives on freight trains. Operating speed on the line was raised to 100 km/h (62 mph).

The Binzhou Railway Electrification Project was officially started on 25 October 2014. The entire 933 km (580 mi) of the line was wired, and 17 new traction substations were built. The first section, from Harbin to Qiqihar, was completed on 3 November 2016; the first electric-hauled train on the line was K7108, pulled by a HXD3D-class locomotive. The remaining section from Qiqihar to Manzhouli was energised on 11 December 2017.

The Eastern end of the route was quadruple tracked in 2015 with the opening of the Harbin–Qiqihar intercity railway, dedicated to passenger service, increasing the passenger-carrying capacity of this section.

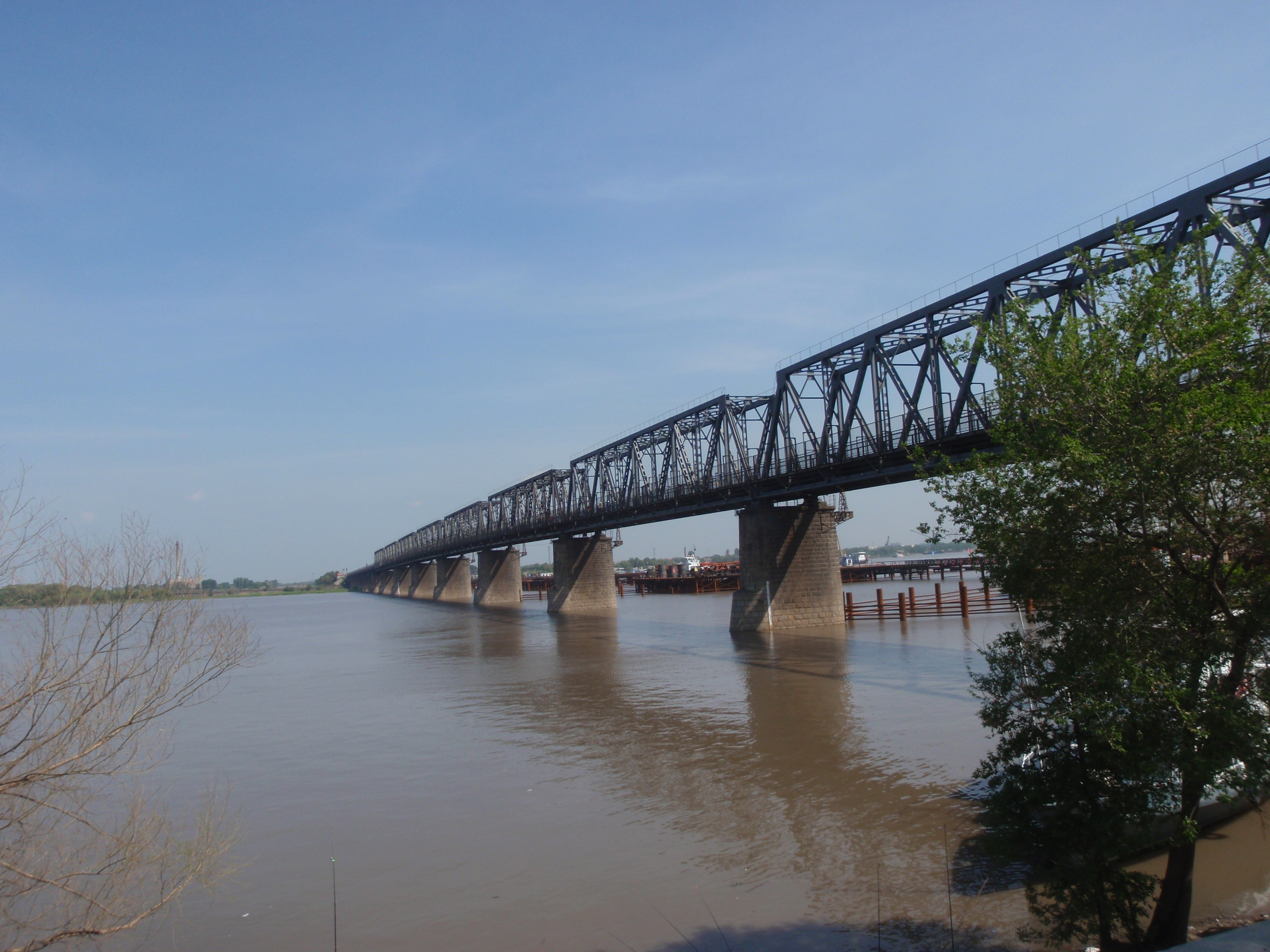
The Binzhou Railway Bridge across the Songhua River in Harbin

The original Binzhou Railway Bridge was built in 1901, and was replaced by a new bridge in 2014. The old bridge is now a historical landmark protected by the city of Harbin.

== Route ==
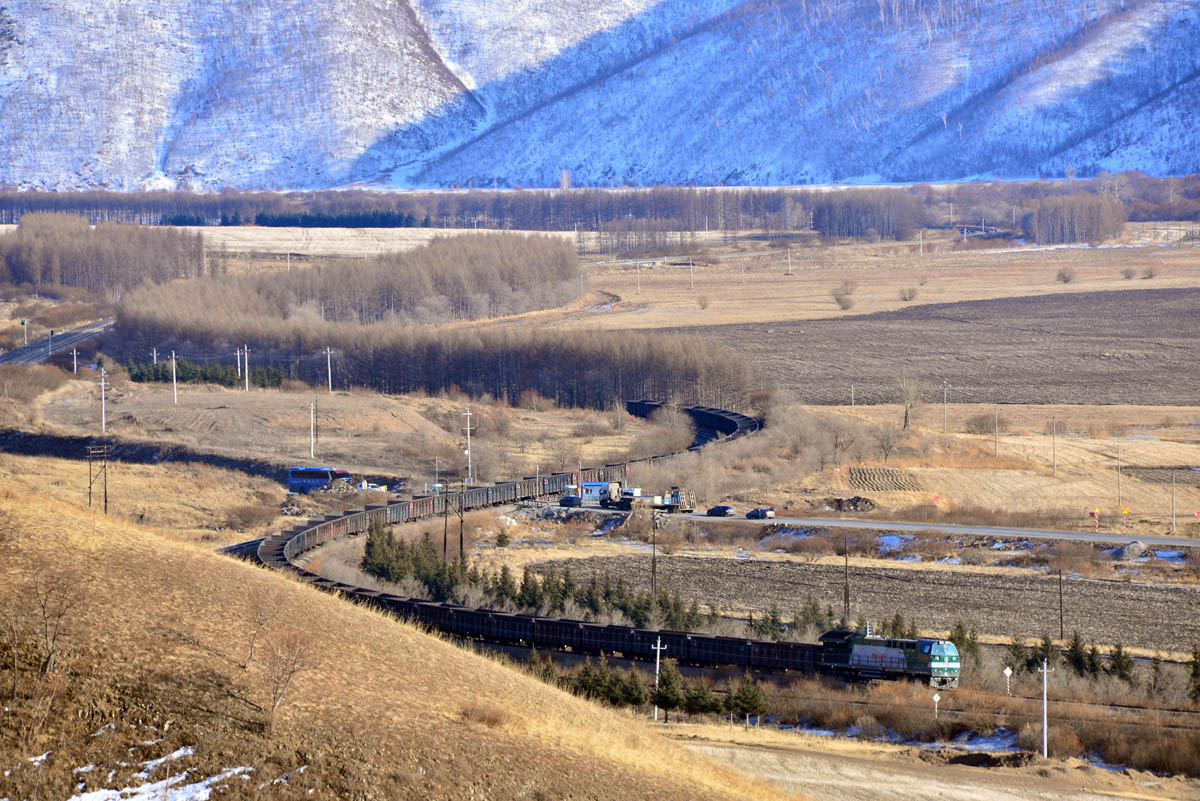
Binzhou Railway near Bugt, Hulunbuir, Inner Mongolia.

Distance		Station name			
Total; km	S2S; km	Current name	Former name	Opened	Connections
0	0	Harbin 哈尔滨	Songhuajiang 松花江	1899	Binbei Railway, Jingha Railway, Binsui Railway, Labin Railway, Binbei Railway
		Songnan 松南			(service halt)
5	5	Songbei 松北		1899	
10	5	Miaotaizi 庙台子		1899	Jiangbei Connecting Line
		Wandong 万东			
		Harbin North 哈尔滨北		2015	
		Dagengjia 大耿家			
20		Wanle 万乐		1899	Wangwan Railway
31	11	Duiqingshan 对青山		1900	
42	11	Limudian 里木店		1900	
52	10	Jiangjia 姜家		1900	
63	11	Zhaodong 肇东		1900	Haqi HSR
74	11	Shangjia 尚家		1900	
84	10	Wulimu 五里木		1900	
96	12	Song 宋		1900	
116	20	Yangcao 羊草		1900	
127	11	Anda 安达		1900	Haqi HSR
137	10	Wolitun 卧里屯		1944	
148	11	Daqing East 大庆东	Longfeng 龙凤	1960	Haqi HSR
159	11	Daqing 大庆	Saertu 萨尔图	1902	
170	11	Daqing West 大庆西	Ranghulu 让胡路		Haqi HSR, Tongrang Railway
180	10	Lamadian 喇嘛甸		1900	
190	10	Qijia 齐家		1960	(freight only)
201	11	~~Gaojia~~; ~~高家~~		1949	Closed
212	11	Dorbod 杜尔伯特	Taikang (泰康); Xiaohaozi (小蒿子); Малые станции саргассов	1900	Haqi HSR
221	9	Qianhoudai 前后代		1960	
238	17	Yantongtun 烟筒屯		1900	
252	14	Houwujia 后五家		1960	
261	9	Hongqiying 红旗营		1949	Pingqi Railway
270	9	Ang'angxi 昂昂溪		1900	San'ang Connecting Line, Qi'ang Railway
277	7	Wufu 五福		1958	
284	7	Fularji 富拉尔基		1900	
293	9	Hurhula 虎尔虎拉		1900	
303	10	Heigang 黑岗		1947	
314	11	Baishanxiang 白山乡		1949	
323	9	Longjiang 龙江		1900	
333	10	~~Laodao~~; ~~老道~~		1947	Closed
344	11	Luhe 鲁河		1947	
355	11	Nianzishan 碾子山		1901	
365	10	Jixinhe 吉新河		1950	
376	11	~~Fengrong~~ 丰荣		1947	Closed
384	8	Genghis Khan 成吉思汗		1901	
395	11	Gulijin 古里金		1947	
406	11	Gaotaizi 高台子		1949	
416	10	Zhalantun 扎兰屯		1901	Azha Railway
425	9	Woniuhe 卧牛河		1901	
435	10	Sandaoqiao 三道桥		1901	(passenger only)
446	11	Halasu 哈拉苏		1902	
456	10	Nanmu 南木		1901	
467	11	Fulin 富林		1901	(passenger only)
478	11	Balin 巴林		1901	
488	10	Lamashan 喇嘛山		1901	
498	10	Zigou 紫沟		1901	(passenger only)
510	12	Yalu 雅鲁		1901	
520	10	Qishan 旗山		1901	
527	7	Goukou 沟口		1901	
531	4	~~Jixiangfeng~~; ~~吉祥峰~~		1987	Closed
539	8	Boketu 博克图	Bugt; Бугтъ	1901	Bolin Railway
546	7	Shali 沙力		1987	(passenger only)
547	1	Shangshali 上沙力		1990	(freight only)
556	9	Xinnangou 新南沟		1901	(passenger only)
564	18	Xing'anling 兴安岭		1901	
574	10	Yiliekede 伊列克得		1901	(freight only)
582	8	Xilingkou 西岭口		1901	(passenger only)
592	10	Halagou 哈拉沟		1901	(passenger only)
604	12	Wunur 乌奴耳		1901	
609	5	~~Sangenhe~~; ~~三根河~~		1987	Closed
614	5	~~Wuchuan~~; ~~乌川~~		1901	Closed
623	9	Beitouhe 北头河		1901	(passenger only)
634	12	Mianduhe 免渡河		1901	
645	11	Xiaobei 小北		1901	
656	11	Zhuoshan 卓山		1901	(freight only)
667	11	Yakeshi 牙克石		1901	Yalin Railway
674	7	Haiman 海满		1901	(freight only)
685	11	Dayan 大雁, ᠳ‍ᠶ‍‍ᠨ		1901	
694	9	Zhaluomude 扎罗木得		1901	
699	5	~~Shunhe~~; ~~顺河~~		1987	Closed
721	22	Hake 哈克		1901	
730	9	~~Xiha~~; ~~西哈~~		1901	Closed
736	6	~~Hongyuan~~; ~~宏原~~		1987	Closed
742	6	Hailar East 海拉尔东, ᠬᠠᠶᠢᠯᠠᠷ ᠳ‍ᠣ‍‍ᠷ‍ᠨ‍ᠣ‍		1901	Yimin Railway (freight only)
749	7	Hailar 海拉尔, ᠬᠠᠶᠢᠯᠠᠷ		1903	
760	11	~~Anyi~~; ~~安邑~~		1901	Closed
771	11	Daliang 大良		1901	(passenger only)
780	9	Wugunor 乌固诺尔		1901	
789	9	Wulanqiu 乌兰丘		1987	(passenger only)
801	12	Donggong 东宫		1987	(passenger only)
811	10	Wangong 完工		1901	
822	11	Doulun Halt 都伦乘降所		1901	(passenger only)
833	11	Lingqiu Halt 陵丘乘降所		1901	(passenger only)
844	11	He'erhongde 赫尔洪得		1901	
855	11	Huangde Halt 皇德乘降所		1901	(passenger only)
866	11	Haomen Halt 豪门乘降所		1987	(passenger only)
874	8	Cuogang 嵯岗		1901	
885	11	~~A'ergong~~; ~~阿尔公~~		1901	Closed
896	11	Hubei Halt 湖北乘降所		1901	(passenger only)
906	10	Jalainur 扎赉诺尔, ᠵᠠᠯᠠᠢᠳᠨᠠᠭᠤᠷ		1901	
912	6	Jalainur West 扎赉诺尔西, ᠵᠠᠯᠠᠢᠳᠨᠠᠭᠤᠷ ᠪᠠᠷᠠᠭᠣᠨ		1898	
919	7	Donghao Halt 东壕乘降所		1898	(passenger only)
927	8	Lubin 胪滨		1898	
935	8	Manzhouli 满洲里, ᠮᠠᠨᠵᠤᠤᠷᠬᠣᠲᠠ	Manchzhuriya; Маньчжурия	1901	
					China–Russia border
939	4	Zabaikalsk; Забайкальск		1901	Trans-Siberian Railway via Trans-Baikal Railway
