= Harbin–Qiqihar intercity railway =

High-speed railway line in China

Overview
- Native name: 哈齐客运专线
- Status: Operational
- Locale: Heilongjiang Province, China
- Termini: Harbin; Qiqihar South
- Stations: 8

Service
- Services: 1
- Operator(s): China Railway Harbin Group

Technical
- Line length: 281.5 km (175 mi)
- Track gauge: 1,435 mm (4 ft 8 1/2 in)
- Operating speed: 250 km/h (155 mph)

The Harbin–Qiqihar intercity railway, also known as the Haqi Passenger Dedicated Line, is China's most northerly high-speed railway. It opened for revenue service on 17 August 2015, connecting the two principal cities in Heilongjiang province, Harbin and Qiqihar.

Operating at up to 250 km/h (155 mph), the high-speed trains have cut the fastest journey time between the cities from 3 h to 85 min. Under construction since 2009, the 286 km (178 mi) line has intermediate stations at Harbin North, Zhaodong, Anda, Daqing East, Daqing West and Dorbod (formerly known as Taikang). It is expected to carry around 8 million passengers a year.

The railway is operated with a fleet of 28 CRH5A trainsets which have been modified to cope with the region's severe winter conditions, where temperatures can fall as low as -40°C. Average temperatures for January are reported to be -19.2°C in Qiqihar and -18.3°C in Harbin.

== Route ==
The railway begins at Harbin railway station and progresses alongside the existing conventional lines to the right adjacent to the Songhua River. After crossing on the Songhua River Bridge, the line reaches Harbin North railway station, newly constructed as part of the line. The line continues alongside the existing conventional Harbin–Manzhouli railway through the suburban areas, progressing through Hulan District before entering Zhaodong. Afterwards it continues beside the Harbin–Manzhouli railway north-west to Anda and Daqing finally diverging to terminate in Qiqihar.

== Stations ==
Harbin, Harbin North, Zhaodong, Anda, Daqing East, Daqing West, Dorbod and Qiqihar South.

== History ==
The line was planned as part of the "Eleventh Five-Year Plan" and was originally proposed in 2006. Construction started in 2009 and the line opened on 17 August 2015.

== Controversy ==
Original plans called for the demolition of nearly century-old Ji Hongqiao, causing Harbin conservation experts and the public to bring attention to the issue, with some people and experts recommending design changes, related to heritage protection.

The original design of the project planned to demolish and rebuild the century-old railway bridge at Binzhou. Through the joint efforts of conservation workers and volunteers, they eventually changed the original design, retaining the old bridge and a new railway bridge for the Harbin–Qiqihar intercity railway.
