= Harbin railway station =

Railway station in China

Harbin 哈尔滨
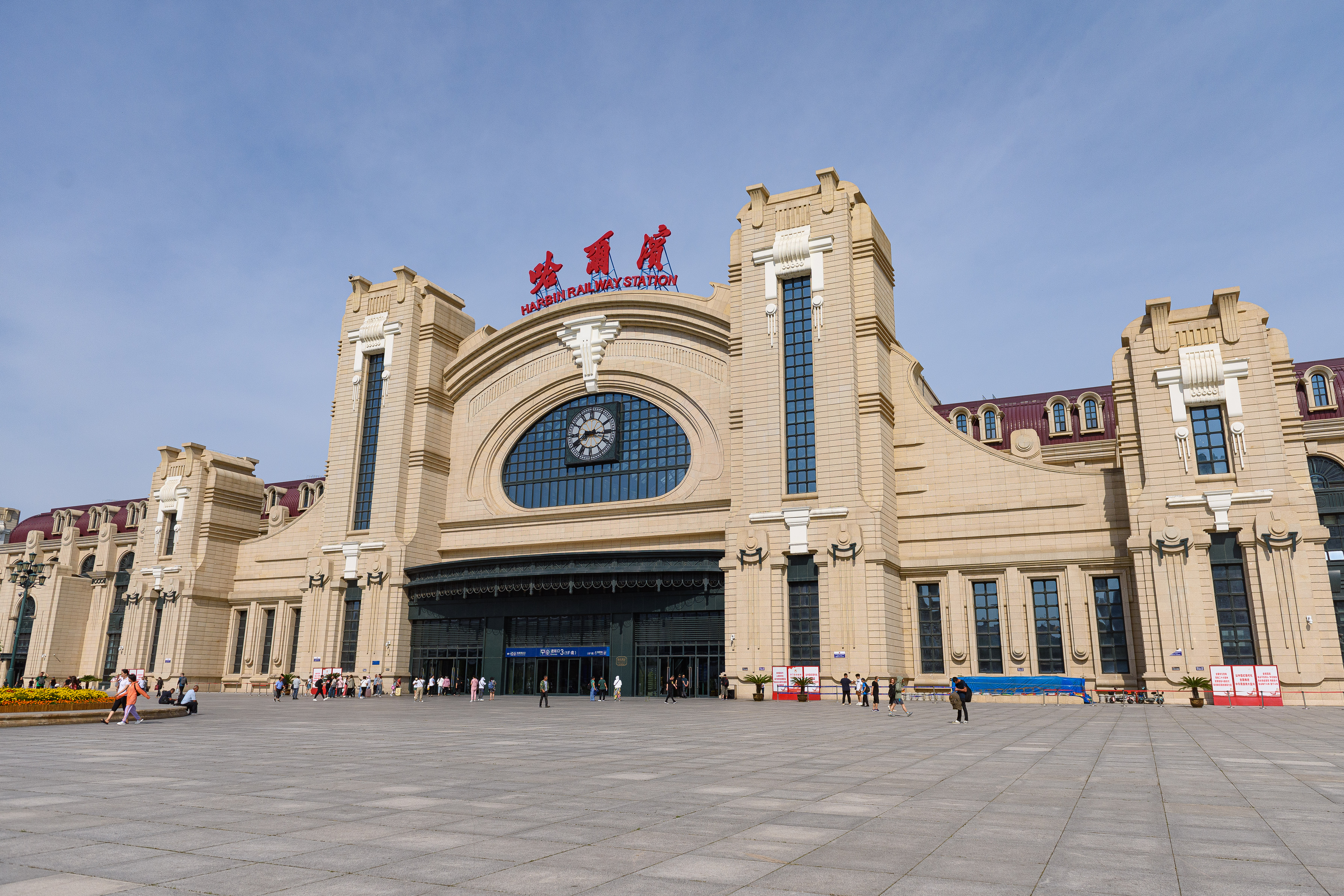
- South facade

Chinese name
- Simplified Chinese: 哈尔滨站
- Traditional Chinese: 哈爾濱站
Transcriptions
Standard Mandarin
- Hanyu Pinyin: Hā'ěrbīn Zhàn

General information
- Location: Tielu Jie, Nangang District, Harbin, Heilongjiang; China
- Coordinates: 45°45′28″N 126°37′28″E
- Operator: CR Harbin
- Lines: Jingha railway, Binsui Railway, Binzhou Railway, Labin Railway, Binbei Railway, Jingha High-Speed Railway, Hada High-Speed Railway; Harbin–Wuchang through train Harbin–Yichun high-speed railway
- Platforms: 14
- Connections: Bus terminal

Other information
- Station code: UIC: 3300200; TMIS code: 55661; Telegraph code: HBB; Pinyin code: HEB
- Classification: Top Class station

History
- Opened: 1899
- Former names: Songhuajiang
Location

Harbin railway station (simplified Chinese: 哈尔滨站; traditional Chinese: 哈爾濱站; pinyin: Hā'ěrbīn Zhàn) is a railway station on the Jingha railway, Binsui Railway, Labin Railway, Binbei Railway and Binzhou Railway. The station is in Nangang District, Harbin, Heilongjiang, China.

== History ==
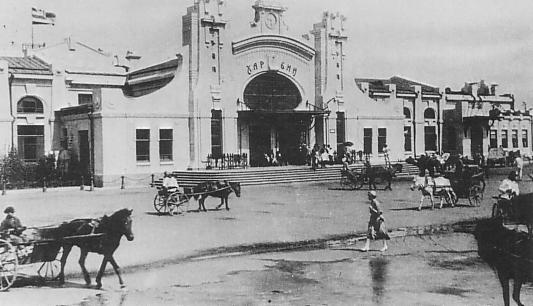
Harbin Station c. 1940 with the Russian letters ХАРБИН seen above the entrance (see Russian Harbin).

Songhuajiang station (Chinese: 松花江站; pinyin: Sōnghuājiāng Zhàn; lit. 'Songhua River railway station') was opened in October 1899 by the Chinese Eastern Railway. It was renamed Harbin Station in July 1903. It was renovated in 1960, 1972, 1989, and 2002. In 2015, construction of new Harbin railway station began, using the design of the original Art Nouveau style in the 1903-built old station. The north and south terminals both completed renovations in 2017, with the terminals of the newly built Harbin railway station opened for public service.

On 26 October 1909, Korean nationalist An Jung-geun assassinated Itō Hirobumi (伊藤博文), the first Prime Minister of Japan, on the platform at Harbin Station. Itō had been Japan's Resident-General in Korea until a few months before his assassination. A memorial hall honoring An Jung-geun was opened on Sunday, 19 January 2014 in Harbin. The hall, a 200-square-metre (2,200 sq ft) room, features photos and memorabilia. However, it was closed and demolished in 2017.

== Metro station ==
Line 2 of Harbin Metro opened on September 19, 2021.

== See also ==
- Harbin Russians
- South Manchuria Railway
- Harbin Subway

Preceding station	China Railway	Following station
Harbin West towards Beijing	Beijing–Harbin railway	Terminus
Sunjia towards Lafa	Lafa–Harbin railway	Terminus
Terminus	Harbin–Suifenhe railway	Chenggaozi towards Suifenhe
Terminus	Harbin–Manzhouli railway	Harbin North towards Zabaykalsk
Terminus	Harbin–Bei'an railway	Xinsongpu towards Bei'an
Preceding station	China Railway High-speed	Following station
Harbin West towards Beijing Chaoyang	Beijing–Harbin high-speed railway	Terminus
Terminus	Harbin–Dalian high-speed railway	Harbin West towards Dalian
Terminus	Harbin–Qiqihar intercity railway	Harbin North towards Qiqihar
