= Qiqihar railway station =

Railway station in China

Qiqihar 齐齐哈尔
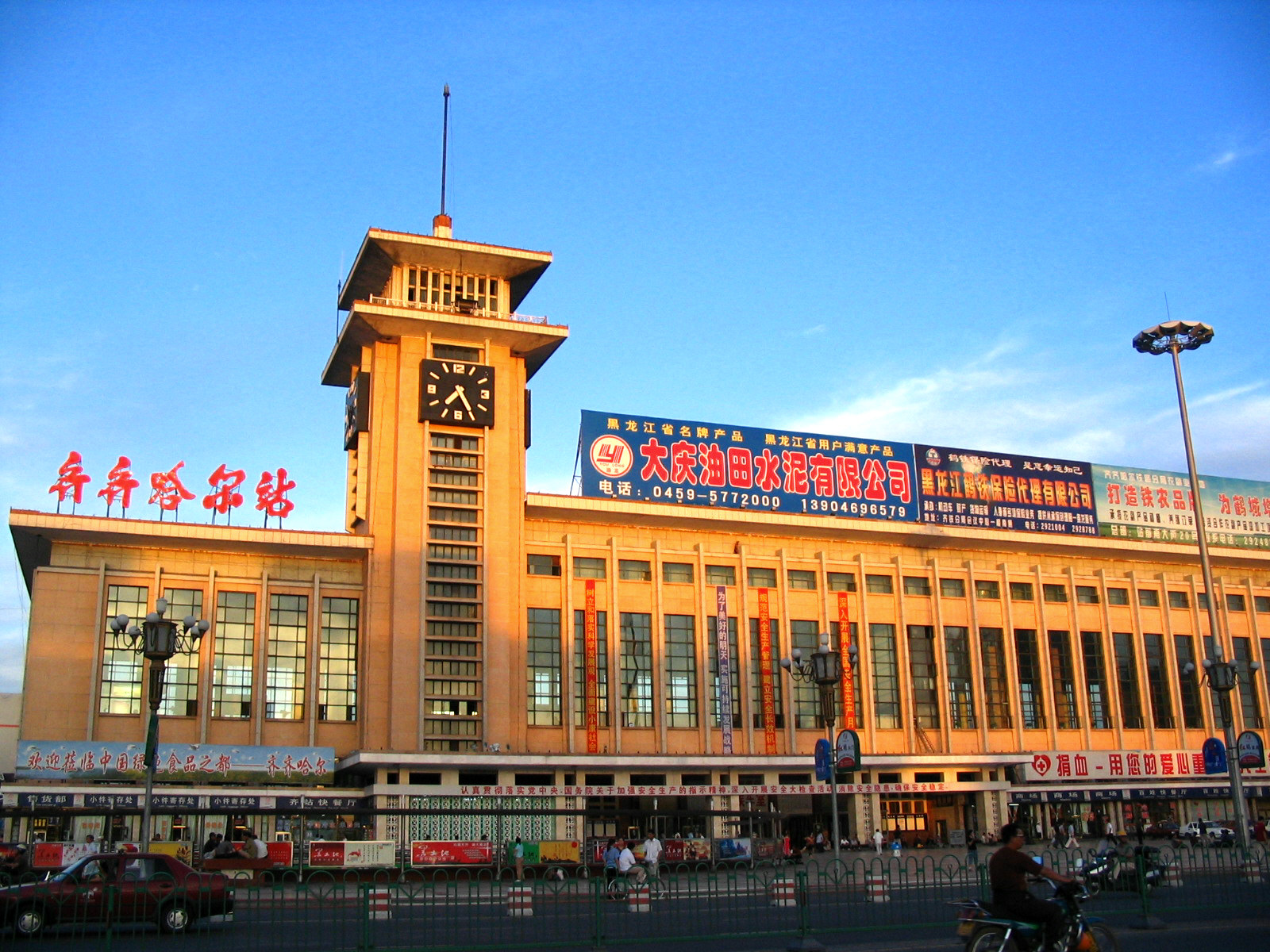
- Qiqihar railway station

General information
- Location: Zhanqian Jie, Tiefeng District, Qiqihar, Heilongjiang; China
- Coordinates: 47°20′14″N 123°59′18″E
- Operated by: Harbin Railway Bureau, China Railway Corporation
- Lines: Harbin–Qiqihar intercity railway Siping-Qiqihar Railway (Pingqi Railway), Qiqihar–Bei'an Railway (Qibei Railway)
- Platforms: 7
- Connections: Bus terminal

History
- Opened: 1909
- Previous names: Nenjiang
Location

Qiqihar station (simplified Chinese: 齐齐哈尔站; traditional Chinese: 齊齊哈爾站; pinyin: Qiqihar Zhàn) is a railway station of the Harbin–Qiqihar intercity railway, Siping-Qiqihar Railway and Qiqihar–Bei'an Railway. The station is located in the town of Qiqihar, Heilongjiang, China.

== See also ==
- Qiqihar South railway station

Preceding station	China Railway	Following station
Terminus	Qiqihar–Bei'an railway	Gaotou towards Bei'an
