= China Railway International Intermodal Passenger Train =

Overview
- Owner: China Railways
- Locale: China; Russia; Mongolia; Kazakhstan; Laos; Vietnam; North Korea
- Transit type: International Train

Operation
- Began operation: June 4, 1959; 67 years ago (K3/4)
- Operators: CR Naning; CR Hohhot; CR Harbin; CR Beijing; CR Xi'an; CR Kunming; CR Urumqi
- Infrastructure managers: China Railway; Korean State Railway; Laos–China Railway; Ulaanbaatar Railway; Russian Railways; Vietnam Railways; Kazakhstan Railways
- Rolling stock: Fuxing CR200J EMU; HX3C; DF4D; DF8; CR Type 25B; CR Type 25G; CR Type 25T

Technical
- Track gauge: 1,435 mm (4 ft 8 1/2 in) standard gauge; 1,520 mm (4 ft 11 27/32 in) Russian gauge
- Electrification: AC 25 kV 50 Hz Overhead cable

China Railway International Intermodal Passenger Train is a passenger train service that jointly operates with Korean State Railway (KSR), Laos–China Railway (LCR), Ulaanbaatar Railway (UBTZ), Russian Railways (RZD), Vietnam Railways (VNR) and Kazakhstan Railways (KTZ) running between Mainland China and neighbouring countries.

== History ==
To strengthen the connection within the socialist camp after the founding of the People's Republic of China, the Ministry of Railways launched the Beijing–Moscow (via Manchuria) K3/4 train. Afterwards, several train routes like Beijing–Pyongyang and Beijing–Ulaanbaatar commenced operations, serving diplomatic, official and civilian exchange purposes.

Sino-Russian train services were reduced as a result of the Sino-Soviet split, but trains to North Korea and Vietnam (suspended due to war) remained in service. Since 1985 the Beijing–Moscow service rerouted through Ulaanbaatar to reduce the running time.

More routes have been opened in response to the demand of international trading and travel. China commenced the Urumqi–Almaty route in 1996, and the Nanning–Hanoi and Urumqi–Astana routes after 2000. Also, the Beijing–Moscow train facilities were upgraded to attract international visitors.

Due to COVID-19, all trains were suspended from January 2020. With the relaxation of border control in December 2022, the Laos–China electric multiple units commenced operations, and routes to Mongolia, Russia and Vietnam resumed. The tourist train between Xi'an and Almaty was commenced on 29 May 2025.

In 2026, the service between Irkutsk and Manchuria commenced and resuming the service between Beijing-Pyongyang.

== List of Services ==
Route	Train No.	Operator	Schedule
Operating
Beijing West–Nanning–Hanoi (Gia Lam)	Z5/Z6, T8701/T8702	CR Beijing CR Nanning	Z5：Departs from Beijing West every Thursday and Sunday, arrives at Gia Lam every Tuesday and Saturday. Z6：Departs from Gia Lam every Tuesday and Friday, arrives at Beijing West every Thursday and Sunday. International passengers are assigned to coach 9 at Beijing West–Nanning section, and transferred to T8701/T8702 at Nanning. Nanning–Hanoi (Gia Lam) section operates daily.
Beijing–Ulaanbaatar	K23/K24	CR Beijing Ulaanbaatar Railways	K23：Departs every Tuesday northbound and arrives on Wednesday. K24：Departs every Thursday southbound and arrives on Friday. Operation rotates between CR and UBTZ.
Hohhot–Ulaanbaatar	4652/4653/4654/4651	CR Hohhot Ulaanbaatar Railways	All passengers must change trains at Erenhot, Chinese section operates daily
Erenhot–Ulaanbaatar	685/686	Ulaanbaatar Railway	Sunday and Thursday from Ulaanbaatar, Monday and Friday from Erenhot
Beijing–Pyongyang	K27/K28	CR Beijing; KSR Pyongyang	K27：Departs every Monday, Wednesday, Thursday and Saturday from Beijing, arrives in Pyongyang every Tuesday, Thursday, Friday and Sunday. K28：Departs every Monday, Wednesday, Thursday and Saturday from Pyongyang, arrives in Beijing every Tuesday, Thursday, Friday and Sunday.
Dandong–Pyongyang	95/85	CR Shenyang; KSR Pyongyang	Daily Coaches are attached to K27/28 from Dandong to Pyongyang
Suifenhe–Grodekovo	401/402	CR Harbin	Daily
Manchuria–Chita–Moscow	353/354	RZD East Siberia	Extended from the Manchuria–Chita 653/654, departs every Wednesday and Sunday
Kunming–Vientiane	D86/D83/D84/D85	CR Kunming	International EMU, calls at all stations operated by CR. Daily
Kunming South–Vientiane	D87/D88	CR Kunming	International EMU, calls at all stations operated by CR. Daily
Kunming–Vientiane	Y26/27/28/25 (Star Express)	CR Kunming	Unschduled
Xi'an–Almaty	Y29/30	CR Xi'an CR Urumqi	Unscheduled Operated by CR Xi'an at Xi'an–Khorgos section with Type 25T coaches, and operated by CR Urumqi at Khorgos–Almaty section with Type 25G international coaches. All passengers change trains at Khorgos station.
Suspended
Beijing–Ulaanbaatar–Moscow	K3/K4	CR Beijing	K3：Departs from Beijing every Wednesday, arrives in Moscow every Monday. K4：Departs from Moscow every Tuesday, arrives in Beijing every Monday
Beijing–Manchuria–Moscow	K19/K20 "Vostok"	RZD Moscow	K19：Departs every Saturday and arrives on Thursday. K20：Departs every Saturday and arrives on next Saturday.
Erenhot–Ulaanbaatar	681/682	Ulaanbaatar Railway	Monday and Friday from Ulaanbaatar, Tuesday and Saturday from Erenhot
Urumqi–Almaty	K9795/K9796	CR Urumqi	Departs every Saturday from Urumqi South, arrives in Almaty every Sunday. Departs every Monday from Almaty, arrives in Urumqi South every Tuesday.
Urumqi–Almaty	K9795/K9796	KTJ Almaty	Coaches are attached with K9797 until Aktogay, and are joined with K9798 from Aktogay.
Urumqi–Astana	K9797/K9798	KTJ Tselinograd	Coaches are attached with K9795 until Aktogay, and are joined with K9796 from Aktogay.
Ji'an–Manpo	7263/8271	CR Shenyang; KSR Kaechon	Formed by CR 7263 and KSR 8271
Terminated
Puer–Luang Prabang	D85/86	CR Kunming	Rescheduled since 18 July 2025 Operates on Mondays, Fridays and Weekends.
Harbin–Vladivostok–Khabarovsk	K7023/K7024	CR Harbin RZD Far East	Terminated since 16 August 2013; Original schedule： K7023：Departed every Wednesday and Saturday; K7024：Departed every Monday and Thursday

== Ridership ==
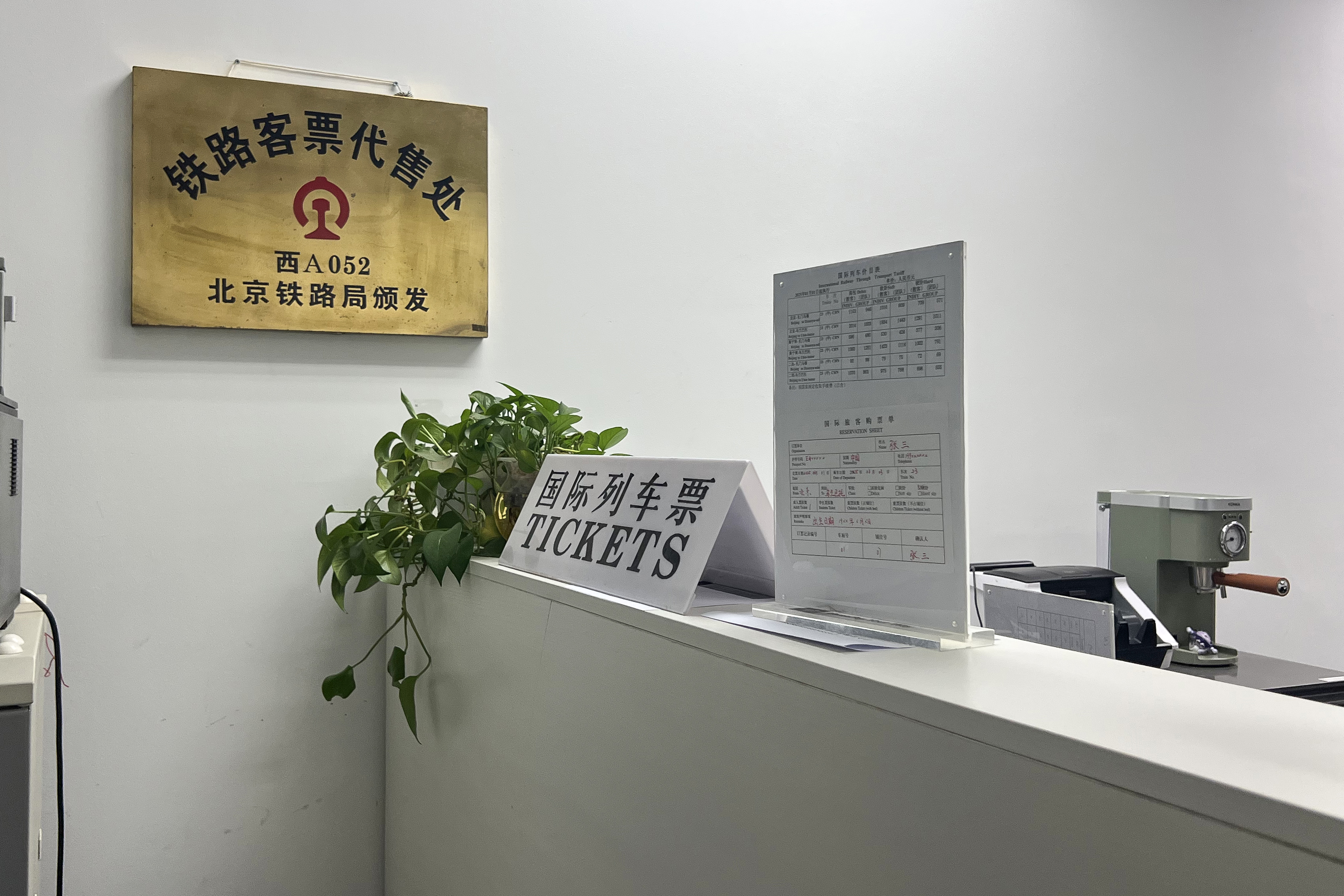
International Train ticketing office at Beijing

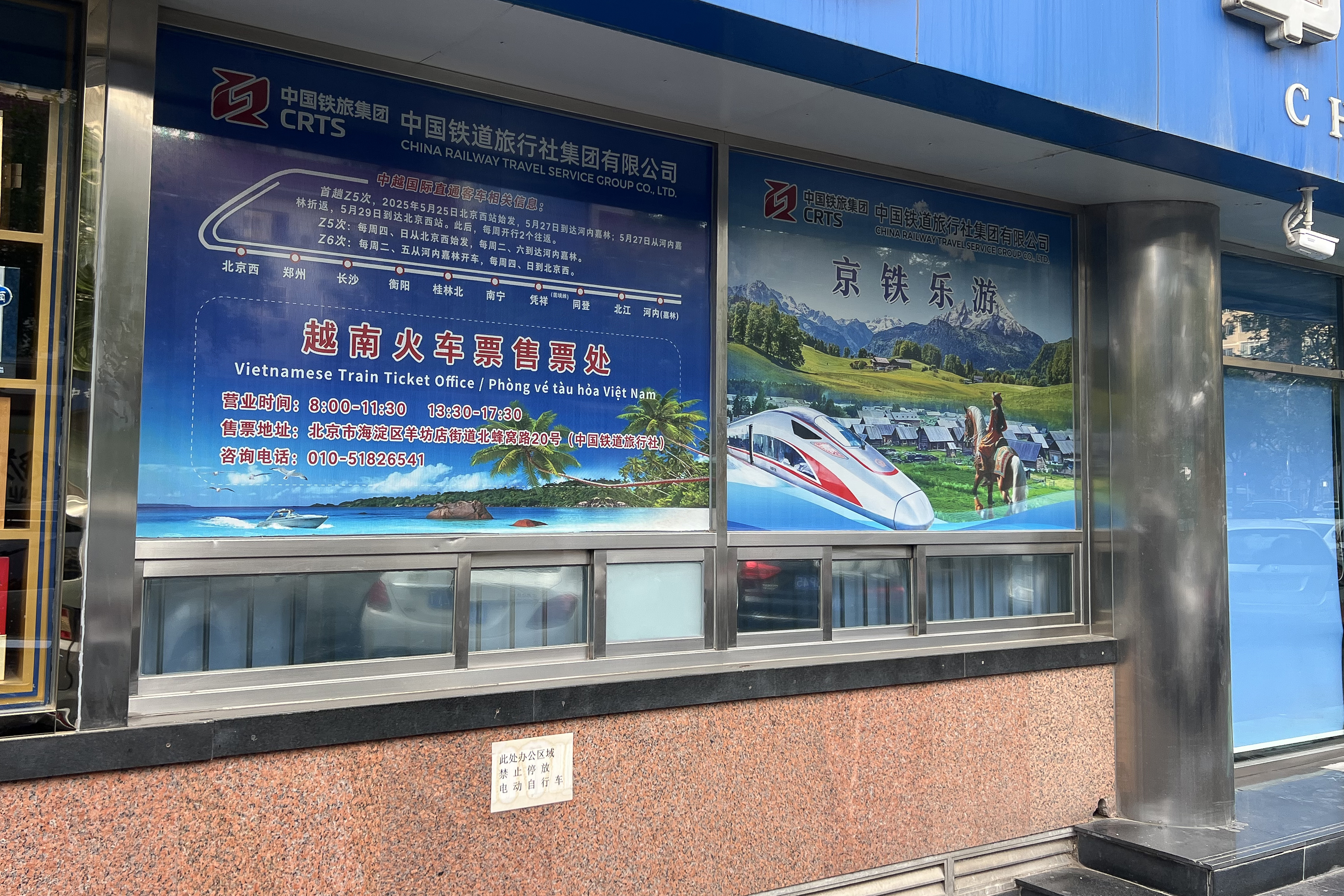
Sino-Vietnamese train ticket counter

All passengers must proceed to immigration at border stations, for example passenger to Vietnam will proceed to immigration at Pingxiang, Guangxi and Dong Dang, Lang Son. Due to different gauge between China and neighboring countries, most trains must break-of-gauge at border stations, with the exception of the Sino-Vietnamese train, which the gauntlet track is installed between Pingxiang and Gia Lam stations.

For ticketing, except Z5/6 can be bought from China Railway Travel Service, other train tickets can be bought from CITS, and a processing fee of 50 yuan is charged per ticket, station counters can only buy domestic section tickets, and most domestic sections are available in electronic tickets with the exception of K4 and K24 using written tickets. Passengers can refer to the official schedule.

All K19/20 "Vostok" tickets can be buy from CTS offices designated by CR Harbin, 401/402 tickets can be buy from

Tickets for 4652/4653 can be bought from Erenhot station, the return trip 4654/4651 can be only bought from Ulaanbaatar station, CR only sell domestic section tickets for this train, 681~686 has a designated counter in Erenhot.

T8701/8702 tickets can be bought along the calling stations and the Naning–Hanoi (Gia Lam) section can be bought from Guilin station.

Tickets for K9795/9796 and K9797/K9798 can be bought from Urumqi Station and Khorgos Station.

Sino-Lao EMU tickets can be bought from 12306 CR app and LCR app online.

== See also ==
- Trans-Eurasia Logistics
- Eurasian Landbridge
