= K7017/7018 Harbin–Wuyiling through train =

Railway service in Heilongjiang, China

The K7017/7018 Harbin–Wuyiling through train (Chinese: K7017/7018次哈尔滨东到乌伊岭快速列车) is a Chinese railway running between Harbin to Wuyiling express passenger trains by the Harbin Railway Bureau, Harbin passenger segment responsible for passenger transport task, Habin originating on the Wuyiling train. 25G Type Passenger trains running along the Binbei Railway, Suijia Railway and Nanwu Railway across Heilongjiang provinces, the entire 620 km. Harbin East Railway Station to Wuyiling Railway Station running 12 hours and 25 minutes, use trips for K7017; Wuyiling Railway Station to Harbin East Railway Station to run 11 hours and, use trips for K7018.
