= K7019/7020 Harbin–Hebei through train =

Railway service in Heilongjiang, China

The K7019/7020 Harbin–Hebei through train (Chinese: K7019/7020次哈尔滨东到鹤北快速列车) is a Chinese railway running between Harbin to Hebei, Luobei County express passenger trains by the Harbin Railway Bureau, Harbin passenger segment responsible for passenger transport task, Habin originating on the Hebei train. 25G Type Passenger trains running along the Binbei Railway, Suijia Railway, Hegang Railway and Hebei Railway across Heilongjiang provinces, the entire 628 km. Harbin East Railway Station to Hebei Railway. Station running 9 hours and 49 minutes, use trips for K7019; Hebei Railway Station to Harbin East Railway Station to run 9 hours and 2 minutes, use trips for K7020.
