= K7031/7032 Harbin–Suihua through train =

Railway service in Heilongjiang, China

The K7031/7032 Harbin–Suihua through train (Chinese: K7031/7032次哈尔滨到绥化快速列车) is a Chinese railway running between Harbin to Suihua express passenger trains by the Harbin Railway Bureau, Harbin passenger segment responsible for passenger transport task, Habin originating on the Suihua train. 25B Type Passenger trains running along the Binbei Railway across Heilongjiang provinces, the entire 125 km. Harbin East Railway Station to Suihua Railway Station running 1 hours and 35 minutes, use trips for K7031; Suihua Railway Station to Harbin Railway Station to run 1 hours and 57 minutes, use trips for K7032.

== See also ==
- 6209/6210 Harbin-Suihua Through Train
