= K7203/7204 Harbin–Jiamusi through train =

Railway service in Heilongjiang, China

The K7203/7204 Harbin–Jiamusi through train (Chinese: K7203/7204次哈尔滨东到佳木斯快速列车) is a Chinese railway running between Harbin to Jiamusi express passenger trains by the Harbin Railway Bureau, Harbin passenger segment responsible for passenger transport task, Habin originating on the Jiamusi train. 25G Type Passenger trains running along the Binbei Railway and Suijia Railway across Heilongjiang provinces, the entire 507 km. Harbin East Railway Station to Jiamusi Railway Station running 7 hours and 35 minutes, use trips for K7203; Jiamusi Railway Station to Harbin East Railway Station to run 8 hours and 16 minutes, use trips for K7204.
