= Bei'an–Heihe railway =

Railway line in Heilongjiang, China

Beihei Railway
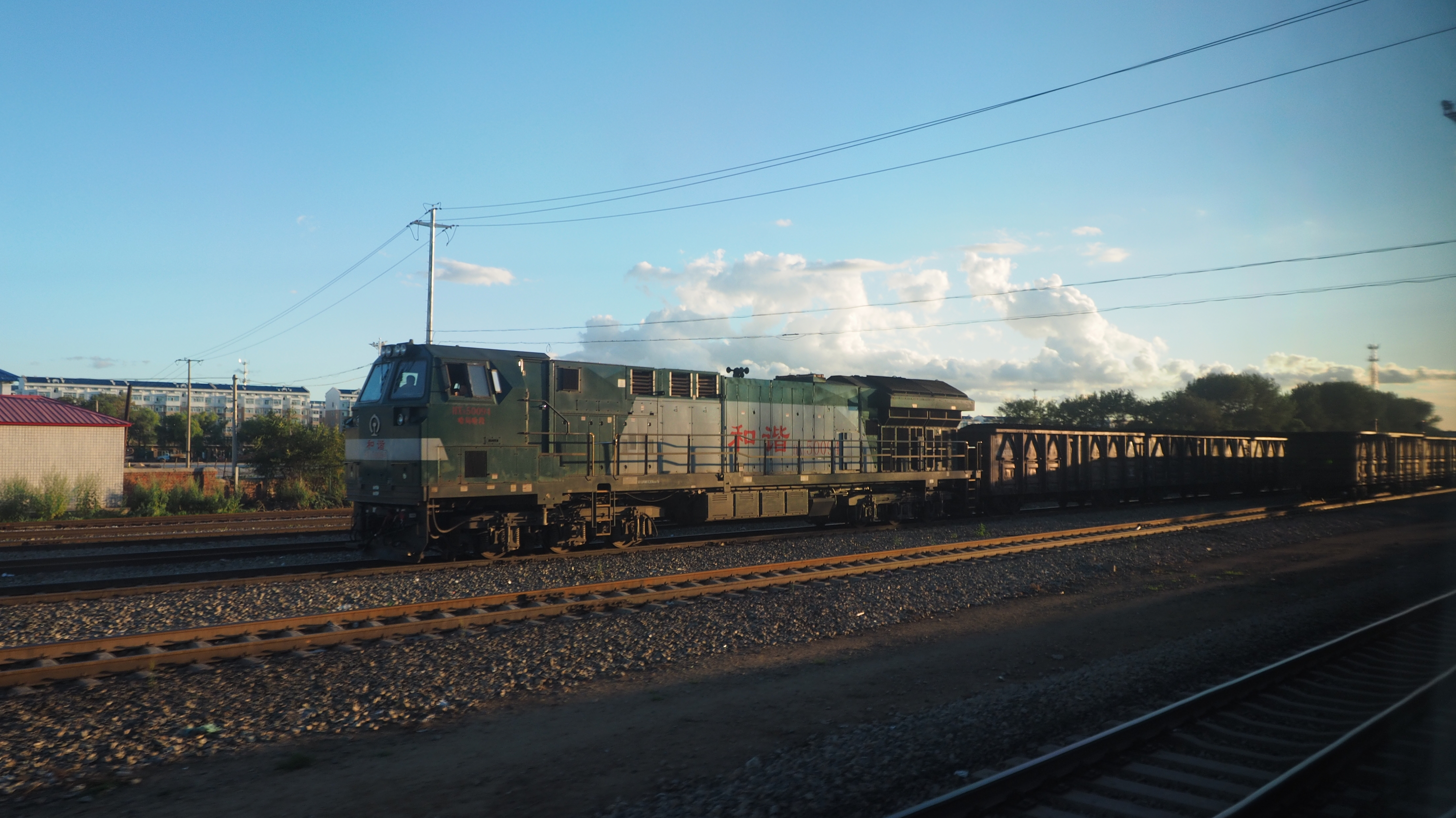
- A freight train at Chenqing on the Beihei Railway

Overview
- Native name: 北黑铁路 (Běihēi Tiělù)
- Status: Operational
- Owner: Manchukuo National Railway (1935–1945); China Changchun Railway (1945–1946); China Railway (since 1964)
- Locale: Heilongjiang Province
- Termini: Bei'an railway station; Heihe railway station
- Stations: 17

Service
- Type: Heavy rail, Regional rail

History
- Opened: 1 December 1935
- Closed: April 1946
- Reopened: August 1964 (Bei'an–Longzhen); 14 December 1989 (Longzhen–Heihe)

Technical
- Line length: 302.9 km (188.2 mi)
- Track gauge: 1,435 mm (4 ft 8 1/2 in) standard gauge

The Bei'an–Heihe railway, named the Beihei Railway (simplified Chinese: 北黑铁路; traditional Chinese: 北黑鐵路; pinyin: Běihēi Tiělù), is a railway line running between Bei'an and Heihe in Heilongjiang in north-eastern China. It is 303 km (188 mi) long with 17 stations, and was constructed between 1933 and 1935.

== History ==
=== Original line ===
Construction of a railway line from Bei'an to Heihe was initiated by the Manchukuo National Railway, which had been formed in 1933 by nationalising privately owned railways in the territory of the puppet state of Manchukuo, which had been established by Imperial Japan in the previous year. Work on the new line, called the Beihei Line (Hokkoku Line in Japanese), began at Bei'an, terminus of the main line of the former Haike Railway, in August 1933, and the first section, 136.8 km (85.0 mi) from Bei'an to Chenqing, was opened in November 1934. Work on the remaining section, from Chenqing to Heihe, began in May 1934, and was completed in February 1935. The complete line was inaugurated on 1 December 1935, with 20 stations, 29 bridges, and one tunnel.

In August 1945, the Soviet Army invaded Manchukuo and took control of the Beihei Line. When the Heilongjiang River froze that winter, they built a temporary bridge over the ice to connect the line to the Soviet Railways at Blagoveshchensk on the other side of the border. The Soviet Army used this temporary connection to ship equipment stolen from Manchuria, and prior to the withdrawal in April 1946, the Beihei Line was ransacked, with anything moveable - locomotives, rolling stock, bridge components, tracks, etc. - being shipped to the Soviet Union. In the spring of 1949, basic repairs were undertaken on the line, but due to the difficulty of running trains, the tracks were removed in the autumn of that year.

=== Reconstruction ===
The project to rebuild the Bei'an–Heihe railway line - named Beihei Railway by China Railway - was officially initiated in May 1963, and the 63.5 km (39.5 mi) section from Bei'an to Longzhen was reopened in September of the same year. Service on that section began on a temporary basis in August 1964. The 71.3 km (44.3 mi) line from Bei'an to Jusheng was opened in November 1965, and officially put into operation in January 1966. However, the 7.8 km (4.8 mi) stretch from Longzhen to Jusheng was soon dismantled again, and due to worsening relations between China and the USSR, the planned reconstruction of the Longzhen–Heihe section was suspended for many years, until it was finally begun on 15 July 1986. Work was completed on 19 September 1989, and regular service between Longzhen and Heihe commenced on 14 December.

=== Upgrade ===
As of 2021, a project is underway to upgrade the Longzhen-Bei'an section of the line. Following the upgrade, the line will have a maximum speed of 160 kilometres per hour (99 mph).

== Route ==
Distance		Station name			
Total; km	S2S; km	Current name	Former name	Year opened	Connections
0	0	Bei'an 北安		1933	Binbei Railway, Qibei Railway
16	16	Erjing 二井		1934	
35	19	Erlongshantun 二龙山屯		1934	
52	17	Wudalianchi 五大连池		1934	
63	11	Longzhen 龙镇		1934	
~~71.3~~	~~7.8~~	~~Jusheng~~; ~~聚盛~~		1934	
81	18	Xianghe 襄河		1934	
		Longmenhe 龙门河		1934	
136.8		Chenqing 辰清		1934	
		Qingxi 清溪		1935	
187		Sunwu 孙吴		1935	
		Sunwu North 孙吴北		1935	
		Eyu 额雨		1935	
234		Chaoshui 潮水		1935	
257	23	Xigangzi 西岗子		1935	
		Sanjitun 三吉屯		1935	
287		Jinhe 锦河		1935	
302.9		Heihe 黑河		1935	
