= K7027/7028 Harbin–Mishan through train =

Railway service in Heilongjiang, China

The K7027/7028 Harbin–Mishan through train (Chinese: K7027/7028次哈尔滨东到密山快速列车) is a Chinese railway running between Harbin to Mishan express passenger trains by the Harbin Railway Bureau, Harbin passenger segment responsible for passenger transport task, Habin originating on the Mishan train. 25G Type Passenger trains running along the Binsui Railway, Tujia Railway and Lindong Railway across Heilongjiang provinces, the entire 645 km. Harbin East Railway Station to Mishan Railway Station running 10 hours and 59 minutes, use trips for K7027; Mishan Railway Station to Harbin East Railway Station to run 10 hours and 21 minutes, use trips for K7028.
