= Xi'an-Almaty tourist train =

Overview
- Service type: Tourist train
- Status: Operating
- Locale: China; Kazakhstan
- Current operators: CR Xi'an; CR Urumqi

Route
- Termini: Xi'an; Almaty 2
- Stops: Khorgos
- Train number: Y29/30

On-board services
- Sleeping arrangements: Yes

Technical
- Rolling stock: Type 25T coaches (Domestic section); Type 25G coaches (Kazakhstan section)
- Track gauge: 1,435 mm (4 ft 8 1/2 in) (Xi'an-Khorgos); 1,524 mm (5 ft) (Khorgos-Almaty)

Xi'an-Almaty tourist train, also known as China-Central Asia International Humanity Train (Chinese: 中国—中亚国际人文专列，Kazakh: Қытай - Орталық Азия халықаралық мәдени-туристік арнайы пойызы) is an international tourist train runs between Xi'an, China and Almaty-2, Kazakhstan. The service commenced on 29 May 2025.

== Coaches ==
The train operates in "domestic and foreign section", which the domestic coaches are operated by CR Xi'an 25T coaches from Xi'an to Khorgos, and passengers will change to international coaches operated by CR Urumqi 25G coaches at Khorgos station. The CR Urumqi coaches will run through the Kazakhstan section as the coaches are already installed with Russian gauge boggies at Khorgos and it will run through the Russian gauge section from Khorgos.

== Schedule ==
- Time difference between China and Kazakhstan is 2 hours

== See also ==
- Urumqi-Almaty through train
- Urumqi-Astana through train
- New Eurasia Land Bridge
