= K7047/7048 Harbin–Mudanjiang through train =

Railway service in Heilongjiang, China

The K7047/7048 Harbin–Mudanjiang through train (Chinese: K7047/7048 次哈尔滨东到牡丹江快速列车) is a Chinese passenger train service running between Harbin to Mudanjiang with express passenger trains by the Harbin Railway Bureau, Harbin passenger segment responsible for passenger transport task, Harbin originating on the Mudanjiang train. 25G Type Passenger trains run along the Binsui Railway across Heilongjiang provinces, the entire 364 km. Harbin East Railway Station to Mudanjiang Railway Station running 6 hours and 21 minutes, use trips for K7047; Mudanjiang Railway Station to Harbin East Railway Station to run 4 hours and 25 minutes, use trips for K7048.

== See also ==
- K7001/7002 Harbin-Mudanjiang Through Train
