= Songpu Subdistrict =

Songpu Subdistrict 松浦街道
- Subdistrict
- Location within Heilongjiang Location within China
- Coordinates: 45°48′38.2″N 126°37′57.2″E
- Country: China
- Province: Heilongjiang
- Prefecture-level city: Harbin
- District: Songbei District

Songpu Subdistrict
- Traditional Chinese: 松浦街道
- Simplified Chinese: 松浦街道
Transcriptions
Standard Mandarin
- Hanyu Pinyin: Sōngpǔ jiēdào
Wu
- Romanization: son phu ka dau
Yue: Cantonese
- Jyutping: cung4 pou2 gaai1 dou6

Songpu Subdistrict is a subdistrict of Songbei District, Harbin, Heilongjiang, China. It is located in the north of Harbin city, on the north bank of the Songhua River, 5 kilometers from the city center. The area of Songpu is 59.74 kilometres (37.12 mi), and the population is about 35,000.

== Etymology ==
The meaning of Songpu is the wharf of Songhua River.

== Geography ==
Songpu is located on the north bank of the Songhua River. At the east and south the north is Limin of Hulan, while in the west is Qianjin and Binzhou Railway.

== Transport ==
The subdistrict has four train stations on the Binbei Railway: New Songpu Station (Chinese: 新松浦站), Miaotaizi Station (Chinese: 庙台子站), North Songpu Station (Chinese: 北松浦站), and Songbei Station (Chinese: 松北站).

Major motorways which run through Songpu Subdistrict include National Highway 202, the Harbin-Heihe Expressway, and the Harbin-Daqing Expressway.

== History ==
In 1850, it was named Majiachuankou (Chinese: 马家船口, literally the wharf of Ma clan) when the wharf was owned by the Ma family. It became a small town, so on December 15, 1912, the governor of Heilongjiang Province ordered that the city council meet at Majiachuankou (马家船口市政局) which belonged to Hulan County.

The next year, it changed its name to Songbei city council (松北市政局). In 1925, it changed its name to Songpu city council (松浦市政局), and became part of Harbin special city in 1933. It became Songpu District in 1938.

In 1953, Songpu District had two townships, Songpu (Chinese: 松浦) and Xinxing (Chinese: 新兴), and two subdistricts, Tangchang (Chinese: 糖厂) and Chuankou (Chinese: 船口). In 1958, Songpu District was momentarily merged into Binjiang District, but Binjiang District was cancelled. Songpu township was then place in Daowai District. Songpu became a people's commune.

In 1979, Daowai restored all the subdistricts, and set more two subdistricts: Zhenjiang (Chinese: 振江) and Chuankou (Chinese: 船口). In 1983, Songpu again became a township. In 1985, Songpu became a town, and Chuankou Subdistrict was merged into Songpu Town.

In 2004, Songpu belonged to Songbei District. In November, the Harbin government approved Songpu as a subdistrict.

In 2017, Chuankou Subdistrict became split off from Songpu. Chuankou took two residential communities, Chuankou (Chinese: 船口) and Guangxin Xincheng (Chinese: 广信新城), and three villages, Taiyangsheng (Chinese: 太阳升), Dongming (Chinese: 东明), and Dengta (Chinese: 灯塔) from Songpu.

== Administrative divisions ==
Songpu Subdistrict administers 5 residential communities and 6 administrative villages. The subdistrict's residential communities are Tangchang (糖厂), Changshengyuan (常盛源), Bei'anqicheng (北岸启程), Beianxinghecheng (北岸兴和城), and Fulicheng (富力城). The subdistrict's administrative villages are Songpu (松浦), Songhuajiang (松花江), Dongfanghong (东方红), Hongxing (红星), Xinhua (新华) and Liming (黎明).

== Economy ==
Numerous factories are located in Songpu Subdistrict, such as the Harbin Sugar Factory and Harbin Ship Factory.
