= Urumqi-Astana through train =

Train service in China and Kazakhstan

Overview
- Service type: Express train
- Status: In operational (Kazakhstan section); Suspended (China section)
- Locale: Kazakhstan; China
- Current operator: KTJ Tselinograd

Route
- Termini: Astana; Urumqi
- Stops: Dostik; Alashankou
- Train number: 053Ц/054Ц（Astana↔Aqtogai） 013Х/014ЦТ（Aqtogai↔Dostik） K9797/9798（China）
- Line used: Turksib

On-board services
- Sleeping arrangements: Yes

Technical
- Rolling stock: MECT Platzkart
- Track gauge: 1,524 mm (5 ft) 1,435 mm (4 ft 8 1/2 in)

Urumqi-Astana through train, 053Ц/054Ц from Astana to Aqtogai, 013Х/014ЦТ from Aqtogai to Dostyk and K9797/9798 in China is an international train operated by KTJ Tselinograd since 27 May 2008, it is the second Sino-Kazakhstan international train after the Urumqi-Almaty route. The travel distance of the train is 1898 km, which the journey lasts for 38.5 hrs. And the return journey lasts for 38 hrs 48 mins.

== History ==
The construction of Lanzhou-Xinjiang railway was completed in 1990 and connected to the Soviet Turksib to form the New Eurasian Land Bridge. However, due to lack of passenger services between China and Europe, the Sino-European transport is limited until the Urumqi-Almaty through train commenced in 1992. With the moving of capital to Astana in 1997, China and Kazakhstan begin to evaluate the possibility of operating a new train route from Astana.

Due to rapid development of Xinjiang as an entreport of Central Asia. The original aviation and land transport did not met the demand, thus the importance raised for a second international railway.

In May 2008, China and Kazakhstan agreed on opening a new train route between Astana and Urumqi, and went into trial operations on 21 May 2008. On 27 May 2008, the train commenced operations as 053Ц/054Ц in Kazakhstan and N897/898 in China, the train is operated by KTJ Tselinograd and change bogies at Dostyk. The train operates one return journey.

From 1 April 2009, CR reschedule N897/898 to K9797/9798 as a part of reschedule.

Due to Astana World Expo in 2017, train 053Ц/054Ц changed the Kazakhstan termini to Astana Nurly Zhol station.

From 20 March 2019, the Kazakhstan termini Astana is renamed to Nur-Sultan until its revert in 2022.

From 2020, due to COVID-19, all services will terminate at Dostyk and the Chinese section is suspended.

== Train composition ==
The train are operated with German made Russian MECT coaches, which there will be four platzkart coaches under KTJ Tselinograd. In addition, the train will be detached and joined with the Urumqi-Almaty train at Aqtogai.

Due to gauge differences between two countries, all KTJ trains will change bogies at Dostik. The passengers will alight the train and wait at the forementioned stations for about 3 hours to complete a full immigration clearance.

Section	Astana↔Urumqi
Coaches	5-8
Type	МЕСТ-36 36 pax Platzkart
Operator	KTJ Tselinograd

== Loco shift ==
Section	Urumqi↔Alashankou	Alashankou↔Dostik	Dostyk↔Moyinty	Moyinty↔Astana
Loco Operator Shift	HXD1D CR Urumqi Urumqi driver	DF8B CR Urumqi Alashankou driver	TE33A DL KTJ KTJ driver	VL80S KTJ KTJ driver

== Schedule ==
- Kazakhstan time is 2 hours behind China

054Ц/013Х/K9798				Stop	K9797/014ЦТ/053Ц			
Train no.	Day	Arrival	Departure	Stop	Departure	Arrival	Day	Train no.
054Ц	Day 1	—	16:58	Astana	13:01	—	Day 3	053Ц
054Ц	Day 1	17:53	18:18	Vyshnevka	12:05	12:07	Day 3	053Ц
054Ц	Day 1	18:52	18:53	Osakarovka	11:27	11:32	Day 3	053Ц
054Ц	Day 1	19:50	19:51	Myrza	10:10	10:30	Day 3	053Ц
054Ц	Day 1	20:21	20:36	Karaganda Marshalling Yard	08:57	09:12	Day 3	053Ц
054Ц	Day 1	20:59	21:19	Karaganda	08:09	08:32	Day 3	053Ц
054Ц	Day 1	22:46	23:07	Zarik	06:33	06:34	Day 3	053Ц
054Ц	Day 2	00:34	00:49	Akadyr	05:19	05:36	Day 3	053Ц
054Ц	Day 2	02:27	02:57	Moyinty	03:09	03:41	Day 3	053Ц
054Ц	Day 2	04:42	04:57	Balqash 1	01:09	01:24	Day 3	053Ц
054Ц	Day 2	05:05	05:15	Balqash 2	00:51	01:01	Day 3	053Ц
054Ц	Day 2	07:44	07:59	Sayak	22:09	22:25	Day 2	053Ц
054Ц/013Х	Day 2	10:30	11:23	Aqtogai	18:28	19:35	Day 2	014ЦТ/053Ц
013Х	Day 2	13:31	13:46	Beskol	16:06	16:21	Day 2	014ЦТ
013Х	Day 2	14:29	14:34	Akshi	15:19	15:24	Day 2	014ЦТ
013Х	Day 2	15:33	15:38	Zalangaskol	13:38	13:43	Day 2	014ЦТ
013Х/K9798	Day 2	16:35	19:50	Dostyk	09:20	12:40	Day 2	K9797/014ЦТ
↑ Kazakhstan（KST UTC+06:00） / China（CST UTC+08:00） ↓
K9798	Day 2	22:10	23:50	Alashankou	08:00	11:00	Day 2	K9797
K9798	Day 3	08:54	—	Urumqi	—	23:33	Day 1	K9797

== See also ==
- Urumqi-Almaty through train
- New Eurasia Land Bridge
