= Harbin hotel fire =

Fatal fire in China in 2018

Coordinates: 45°47′23″N 126°36′23″E

- Date: 25 August 2018
- Time: 04:36 (CST)
- Duration: 3 hours
- Venue: Beilong Hot Spring Hotel
- Location: Taiyang Island, Songbei District, Harbin, Heilongjiang, China
- Type: Hotel fire
- Deaths: 20
- Injuries: 23

On 25 August 2018, a fire broke out at the Beilong Hot Spring Hotel (Chinese: 北龙温泉酒店) in Harbin. Located in the city's Taiyang Island (太阳岛) resort area, the four-storey brick-and-concrete hotel mostly accommodates domestic tourists and was hosting over 100 people at the time, many of whom were visiting for an annual marathon. The fire resulted in 20 deaths and 23 injuries.

== Fire ==
At 04:36 on 25 August, a fire broke out in a kitchen of a karaoke bar on the hotel's second floor. Many of the guests, mostly Chinese tourists staying for the 2018 Harbin International Marathon, were asleep. The fire itself spread over 400 square metres (4,300 sq ft) along the second through fourth floors and first floor main hall. Smoke from combustibles in the kitchen and karaoke bar spread up the stairways and air systems into the hallways, requiring firefighters to evacuate more than 80 guests with at least 20 needing rescue. A survivor of the fire told reporters "I didn't hear any smoke alarm until after the fire was extinguished ... There was heavy smoke in the corridor and no indicator lights pointing to the exit." Emergency crews including 105 firefighters and 30 engines attended the inferno.

== Casualties ==
At 07:50 the fire was considered extinguished, and fire officials discovered 18 fatalities inside the resort with one more fatality at the hospital. The death toll rose to 20 a day later, when investigators found one last body under the burned debris. The Beijing Jiufangyuyue Commercial and Trading Co confirmed in the days after the fire that all of the deceased victims were members of a 10-day trip through their company, aged 59 to 85.

All victims of the fire were identified through on-site identification and DNA matching.

== Investigation ==
The Ministry of Emergency Management sent a team of workers to assist with investigating the incident. A legal representative of the hotel was detained for questioning by the Harbin public security bureau the same day, and the Deputy Director of MEM's fire control bureau immediately ordered safety checks at hospitals, senior living homes, schools, major venues and other hotels.

Fire officials revealed the next day that the hotel had failed at least five safety inspections in the past two years. Harbin's fire department had deemed the building unsafe in 2016 due to its maze-like hallways and shortage of fire exits and extinguishers, and ordered the hotel to suspend operations until compliant.

== Legal ==
The public security bureau of Harbin issued a wanted notice on 29 August 2018, for a female suspect in connection with the hotel camera. The police offered a reward up to 300,000 yuan ($44,000 USD) for information that leads to finding the female suspect. The suspect, 52 year-old Li Yanbin (李艳滨), was arrested on 30 August 2018.

== See also ==
- List of building or structure fires
