= Songbei, Harbin =

Songbei 松北区
- District
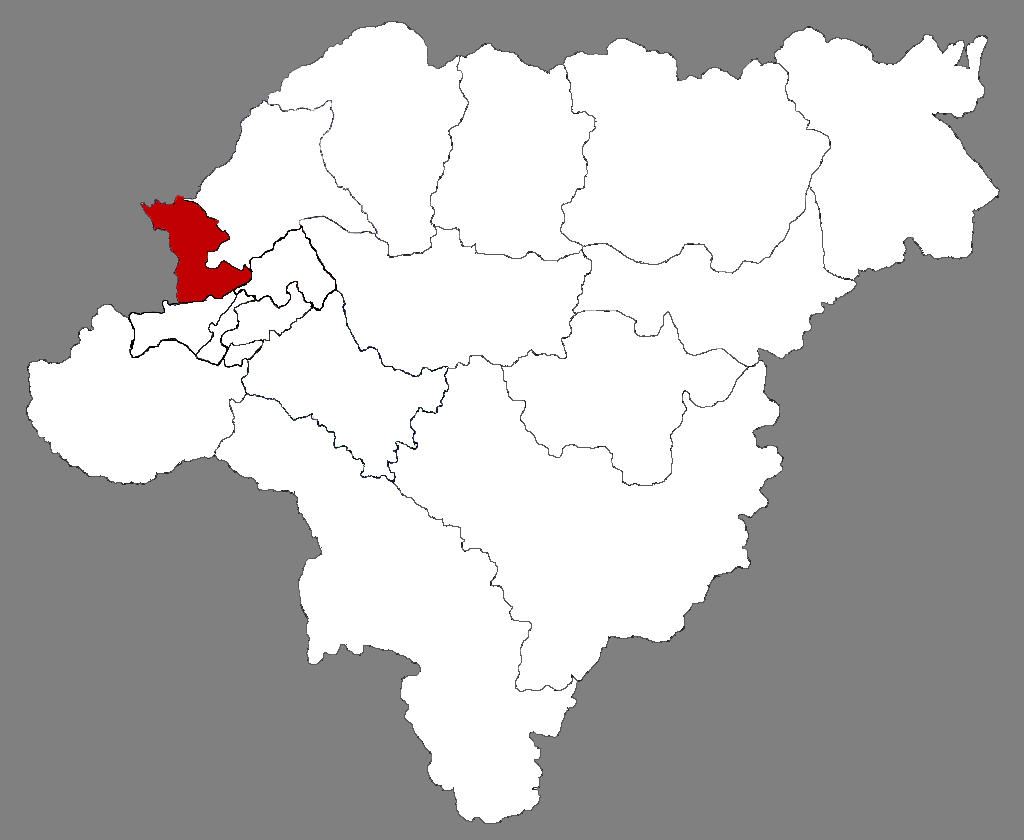
- Location of Songbei in Harbin

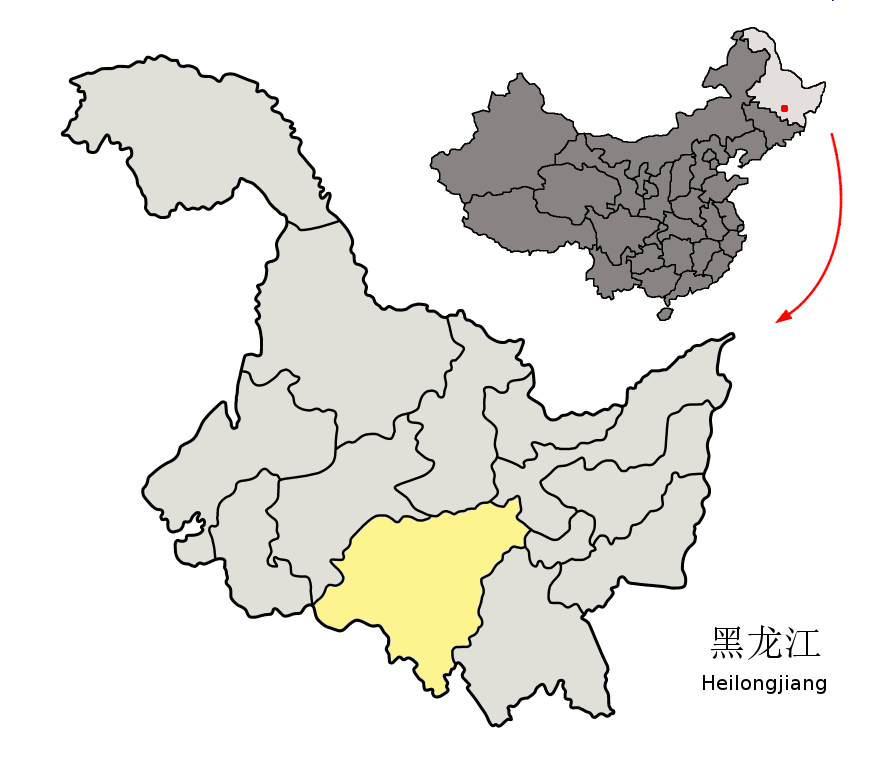
- Harbin in Heilongjiang
- Coordinates: 45°49′09″N 126°31′37″E
- Country: People's Republic of China
- Province: Heilongjiang
- Sub-provincial city: Harbin

Area
  - Total: 736.8 km^{2} (284.5 sq mi)

Population (2018)
  - Total: 222,422
  - Density: 301.9/km^{2} (781.9/sq mi)
- Time zone: UTC+8 (China Standard)
- Postal code: 150028
- Website: songbei.gov.cn

Songbei District (simplified Chinese: 松北区; traditional Chinese: 松北區; pinyin: Sōngběi Qū) is one of nine districts and the municipal seat of the prefecture-level city of Harbin, the capital of Heilongjiang Province, Northeast China, forming part of the city's urban core. Its name literally means "north of Song", referring to its position north of the Songhua River which runs through the city. It borders the districts of Hulan to the northeast, Daowai to the east, and Daoli to the west, as well as the prefecture-level city of Suihua to the north and west.

== Administrative divisions ==
Subdistricts:

- Songbei Subdistrict (松北街道), Songpu Subdistrict (松浦街道), Wanbao Subdistrict (万宝街道), Taiyangdao Subdistrict (太阳岛街道), Song'an Subdistrict (松安街道), Songxiang Subdistrict (松祥街道), Chuankou Subdistrict (船口街道)

Town:

- Duiqingshan (对青山镇)

Former : Sandian Subdistrict (三电街道), Leye Town (乐业镇)

== See also ==
Harbin hotel fire
