= Dandong-Pyongyang through train =

Train service in China and North Korea

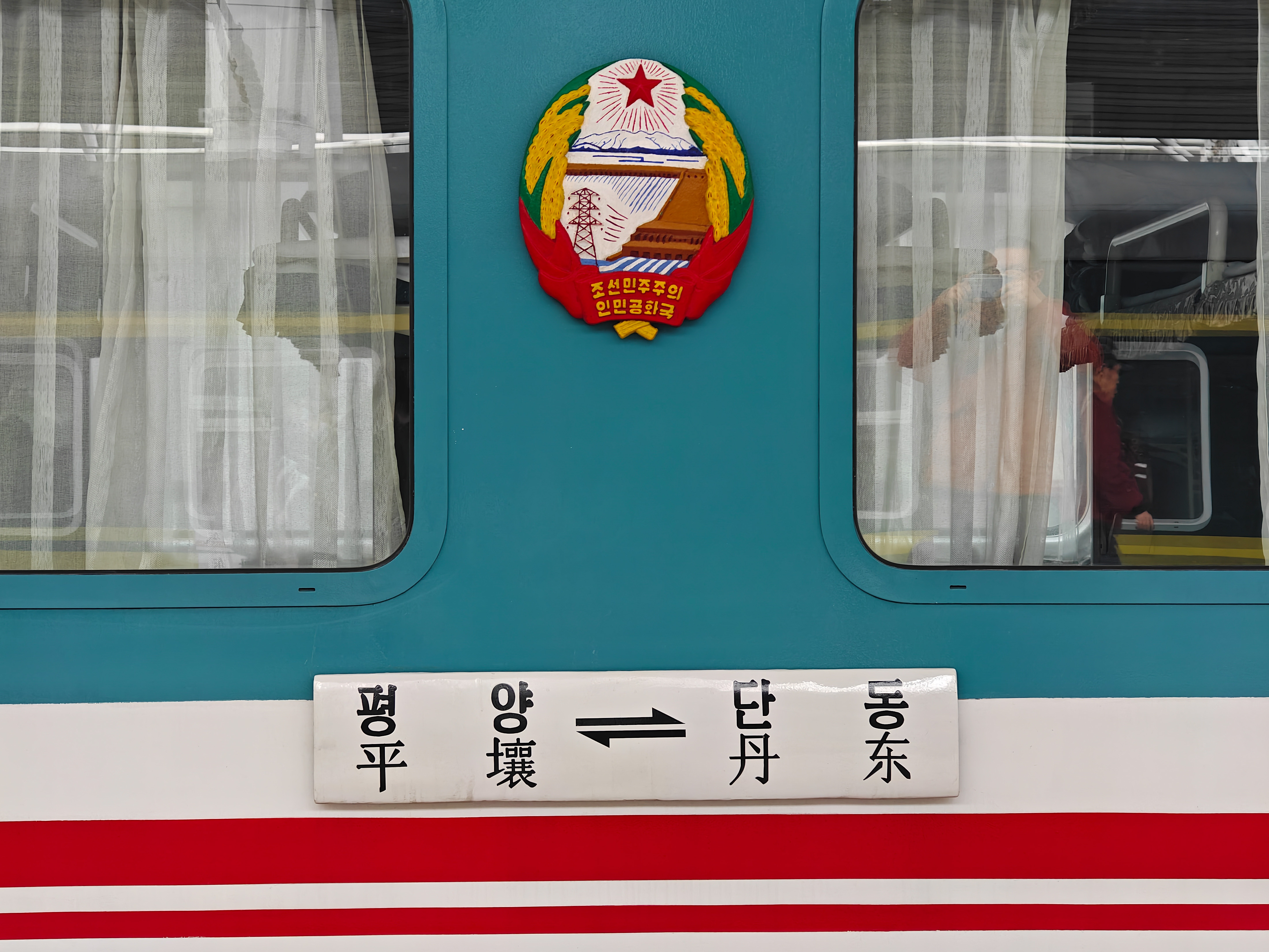

Overview
- Service type: International train
- Status: Operating
- Current operators: CR Shenyang; KSR Pyongyang

Route
- Termini: Dandong; Pyongyang
- Distance travelled: 228 km
- Average journey time: 7 h 45 mins (Dandong-Pyongyang) 6 h 48 mins (Pyongyang-Dandong)
- Service frequency: Daily
- Train numbers: 95/85 (CR); 51/52 (KSR)

On-board services
- Class: Hard Sleeper
- Sleeping arrangements: Yes
- Catering facilities: Yes
- Baggage facilities: Yes

Technical
- Rolling stock: CR Type 25G international coaches KSR Type 30 coaches
- Track gauge: 1,435 mm (4 ft 8 1/2 in)

Dandong-Pyongyang through train, numbered as 95/85 in China and 51/52 in DPRK, is an international train run between Dandong and Pyongyang. It commences operation since 1 January 1954.

From 30 Jan 2020, it was suspended due to COVID 19 until 12 March 2026.

== Overview ==
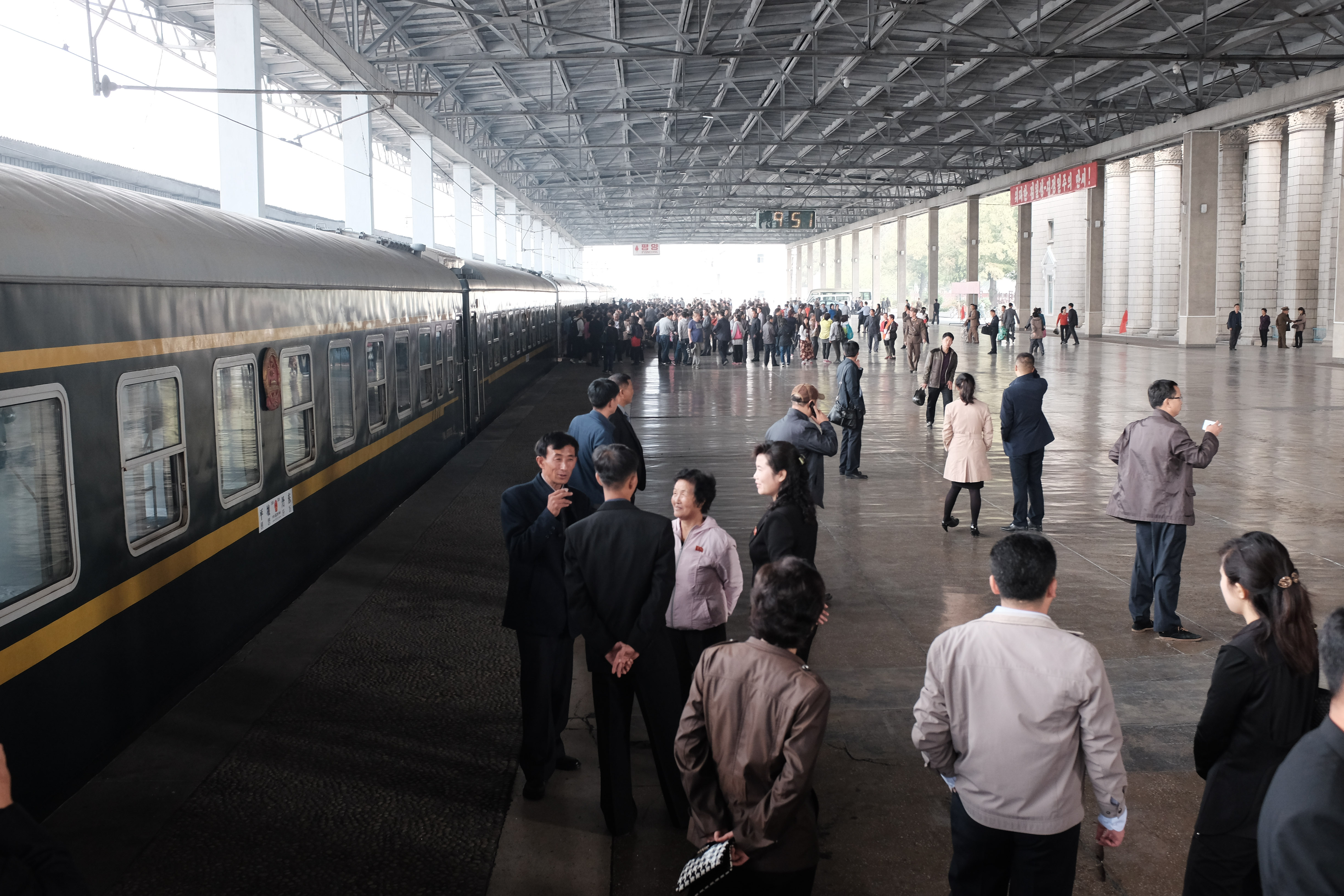
Train at Pyongyang（2016）

The train service began operating on April 1, 1954, initially running every other day. Since January 1, 2013, it has operated daily, using 3 to 4 hard sleeper carriages. During peak travel periods, the number of carriages can increase to as many as 8. In the 1980s, this train typically carried only a dozen or so passengers per trip, but in recent years, the number of travelers has increased significantly. The train is also used by ordinary North Korean citizens. Chinese immigration and customs procedures are conducted in the waiting hall of Dandong Station, where passengers complete their entry or exit formalities before boarding or after disembarking.

After crossing the Sino–Korean Friendship Bridge (referred to by North Korea as the “DPRK–China Friendship Bridge,” Korean: 조중친선다리), the train arrives at Sinuiju Youth Station. Here, the train stops for an extended period while North Korean border guards board the train to conduct routine inspections and process immigration procedures for passengers. The actual stopping time depends on the efficiency of the inspection. According to the timetable, the journey from Sinuiju to Pyongyang is scheduled to take 4 hours, but in reality, it usually takes 6 to 7 hours.

On May 27, 2015, CR Shenyang launched a special North Korea-bound tourist train departing from Shenyang. After departing Shenyang Station, it arrives in Dandong in the early hours of the following day. Tourists complete their exit procedures at Dandong Station and then transfer to Train 95/85 to enter North Korea.

== Train Composition ==
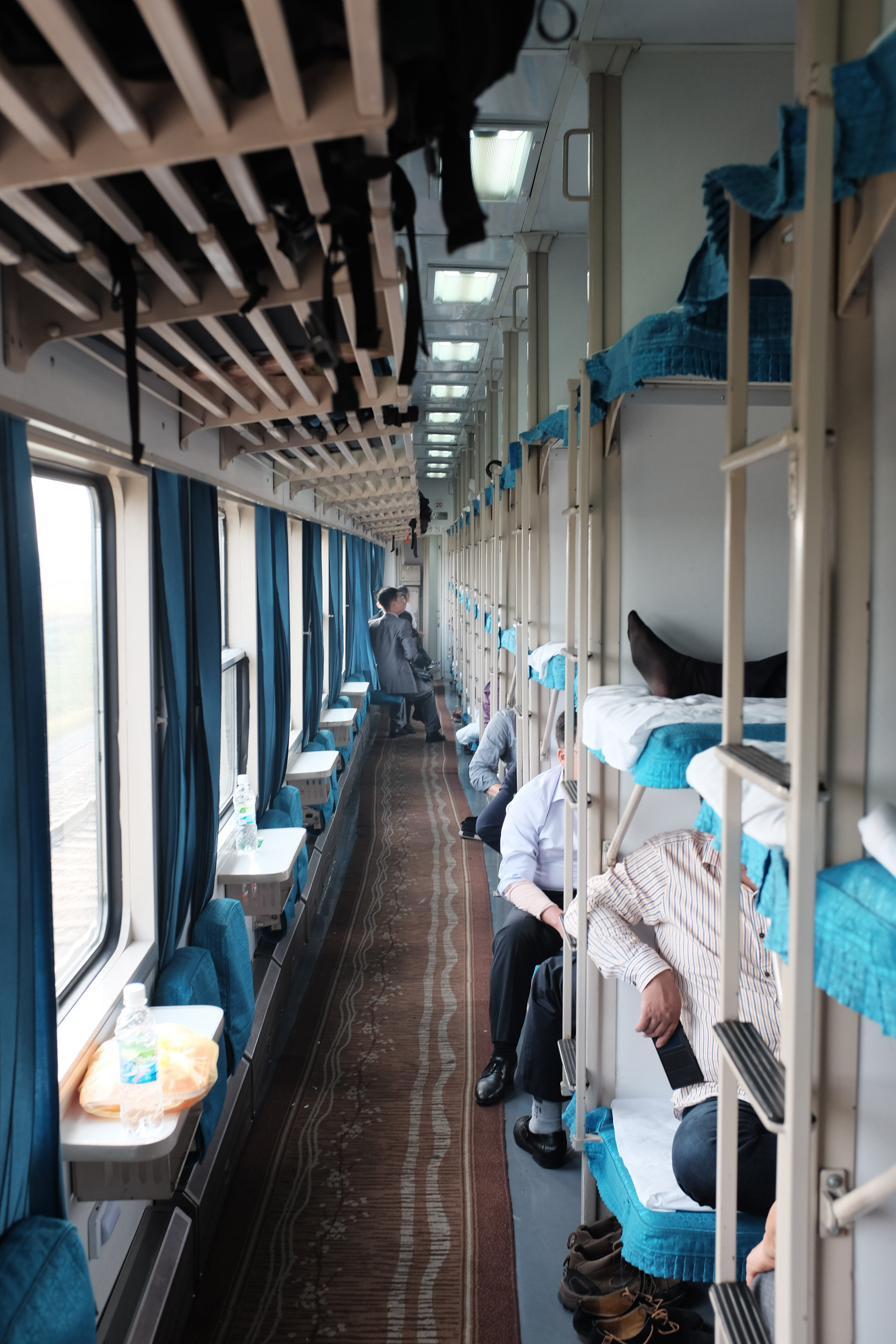
Inside hard sleeper（2016）

The CR train uses CR25G coaches assigned to CR Shenyang. It normally runs in a 7-car formation: five hard-sleeper coaches, one power-car with air-conditioning generator, and one Korean State Railway baggage car. On-board service is handled by the CR Shenyang.

The KSR train consist uses Type 30 coaches manufactured by Nanjing Puzhen as a derivative of the CR25G. It runs in a 6-coach formation: five hard-sleeper coaches (Korean: 일반침대 30, 66 berths each) and one baggage car, with passenger services provided by KSR Pyongyang.

At Dandong Station, the train will also pick up or set out two sleeper cars from Beijing–Pyongyang train K27/28, coupling or uncoupling them as required for the through service.

Section	Dandong↔Pyongyang（CR）			Pyongyang↔Dandong（KSR）		Sinuiju↔Pyongyang		
Coach no.	Nil	Nil	19-23	Nil	14-18	Nil	Nil	24-25
Type	수하물30 Luggage	KD25G Air-con	YW25G Hard sleeper	수하물30 Luggage	일반침대30 Standard sleeper	수하물30 Luggage	식당차30 Restaurant	일반침대30 Standard sleeper
Operator	KSR Pyongyang	CR Shenyang		KSR Pyongyang		KSR Pyongyang		

== Loco shift ==
The train is hauled by DF5（Korean：내연100） from CR Shenyang or KSR Kaechon for Dandong-Sinuiju section. And the Sinuiju-Pyongyang section is hauled by DF4 or DF4B（Korean：내연200）from KSR Pyongyang.

Section	Dandong ↔ Sinuiju	Sinuiju ↔ Pyongyang
Loco Operator Shift	DF5 CR Shenyang/KSR Dandong driver/KSR driver	DF4 DF4B KSR KSR driver

== Timetable ==
- 1 hour difference

95/52				Stop	85/51			
Train no.	Day	Arrival	Departure	Stop	Arrival	Departure	Day	Train no.
95	Day 1	Departure	10:00	Dandong	16:23	Arrival	Day 1	85
↑ China（Beijing Time UTC+08:00） / North Korea（Pyongyang Time UTC+09:00） ↓
95/52	Day 1	11:10	13:09	Sinuiju Youth	15:32	17:13	Day 1	51/85
52	Day 1	14:12	14:29	Tongrim	14:27	14:31	Day 1	51
52	Day 1	15:43	15:53	Chongju Youth	13:11	13:17	Day 1	51
52	Day 1	18:45	Arrival	Pyongyang	Departure	10:25	Day 1	51

== See also ==
- Beijing-Dandong-Pyongyang through train
- Pyongui Line
