= Urumqi-Almaty through train =

Train between China and Kazakhstan

Overview
- Service type: International Train
- Status: Suspended
- Current operators: KTJ Almaty; CR Urumqi

Route
- Termini: Urumqi South; Almaty-2
- Stops: Alashankou; Dostik; Aqtogai
- Distance travelled: 1359 km
- Train numbers: 013Х/014ЦТ （KTJ） 103Ц/104ЦА （CR in Kazakhstan） K9795/9796（CR）
- Line used: Turksib

Technical
- Rolling stock: MECT coaches (KTJ); Type 25G (CR Urumqi)
- Track gauge: 1,435 mm (4 ft 8 1/2 in); 1,524 mm (5 ft)

Kazakhstan Railways 013Х/014ЦТ, numbered as K9795/9796 in China is an international K-train co-operated by KTJ Almaty and CR Urumqi, it is the first train between China and Kazakhstan from 1992. The KTJ train departs every Sunday from Almaty-2 and arrives at Urumqi the next day, the journey last for 30 hrs 47 mins and the return journey last for 31 hrs 51 mins, arriving Almaty-2 on Wednesday. CR Urumqi joined the service in 1993, the train no. in Kazakhstan is 103Ц/104ЦА. CR trains depart Urumqi every Saturday and arrives at Almaty-2 next day, the journey is 25 hrs 26 mins, and will return from Almaty-2 on Monday, arriving Urumqi the next day, which last for 21 hrs 49 mins. The distance traveled by two companies are 1359 km for KTJ and 1048 km for CR.

== History ==
China and Soviet Union agreed to build a third Sino-Soviet international corridor in 1954, both countries responsible for building their sections. In 1958, Lanzhou-Xinjiang railway commenced construction with the North Xinjiang railway. However, due to Sino-Soviet split, the Urumqi-Alashankou section construction was halted in May 1961 until 1 May 1985 when both countries ties revived, the forementioned section connected the Turksib on 12 September 1990, forming the New Eurasia Land bridge.

In 1991, Alashankou-Druzhba (now Dostik) commenced passenger and freight services. The same year with the dissolution of Soviet Union, the counterpart of Alashankou railway checkpoint become Kazakhstan. In 1992, China and Kazakhstan completed an agreement on opening Alashankou-Dostik checkpoint and operate Urumqi-Almaty passenger service, the agreement was signed at Almaty. Both countries agreed the train will be operated by CR Urumqi and KTJ Almaty.

On 20 June 1992, Almaty-Urumqi through train commenced operations with the number 13/14, the train is operated by KTJ one train weekly. At the inauguration ceremony, delegations from Kazakhstan and China attended. Three days later, the train inaugurated services from Urumqi, the ceremony was attended by delegations from China, Kazakhstan, Uzbekistan, Tajikistan and Kyrgyzstan.

Between 1992 and 1993, a KTJ Urumqi-Tashkent coach is attached to the train. Also between 1993 and 1994, a CR Lanzhou-Almaty 243/244 coach is attached to the train from Urumqi. In addition, an additional train 13/14 operated by CR Urumqi commenced operations from 1993.

From the reschedule in 2009, N895/896 is renumbered as K9795/9796.

From 2017, CR trains will process immigration at Khorgos and Altynkol, the coaches are replaced with Type 25G coaches, the train number in Kazakhstan is renumbered as 103Ц/104ЦА. With the reroute of the train, the travel distance shortened 301 km to 1048 km and the duration is decreased 1/3 about 24 hours less. KTJ trains will continue to clear immigration at Alashankou and Dostik.

Due to COVID-19, K9795/9796 service is suspended.

== Coaches ==
KTJ trains are operated with German made Russian MECT coaches, which there will be four platzkart coaches under KTJ Almaty, while CR trains are operated with six coaches fo Type 25G international variant coaches, which 5 soft sleepers and an air-con coach under CR Urumqi.

Due to gauge differences between two countries, all KTJ trains will change bogies at Dostik while CR trains change at Khorgos. The passengers will alight the train and wait at the forementioned stations for about 3 hours to complete a full immigration clearance.

Section	Almaty↔Urumqi（KTJ）	Urumqi↔Almaty（CR）	
Coaches	1-4	1	2-3,5-6,10
Type	МЕСТ-36 36 pax Platzkart	KD25G Air-con	RW25G Soft Sleeper
Operator	KTJ Almaty	CR Urumqi	

== Loco shift ==
=== KTJ shift ===
Section	Urumqi↔Alashankou	Alashankou↔Dostik	Dostik↔Almaty-1	Almaty-1↔Almaty-2
Loco Operator Shift	HXD1D CR Urumqi Urumqi driver	DF8B CR Urumqi Alashankou driver	TE33A DL KTJ KTJ driver	KZ4A EL KTJ KTJ driver

=== CR shift ===
Section	Urumqi↔Khorgos	Khorgos↔Almaty-1	Almaty-1↔Almaty-2
Loco Operator Shift	HXD1D CR Urumqi Urumqi driver	TE33A DL KTJ KTJ driver	KZ4A EL KTJ KTJ driver

== Timetable ==
- Kazakhstan time is 2 hours behind China

=== KTJ shift ===
013Х/K9796				Stop	K9795/014ЦТ			
Train no.	Day	Arrival	Departure	Stop	Departure	Arrival	Day	Train no.
013Х	Day 1	—	00:01	Almaty 2	05:24	—	Day 3	014ЦТ
013Х	Day 1	00:23	00:53	Almaty 1	04:32	05:02	Day 3	014ЦТ
013Х	Day 1	02:00	02:03	Kapchagai	03:19	03:22	Day 3	014ЦТ
013Х	Day 1	04:05	04:20	Sary-Ozek	01:00	01:15	Day 3	014ЦТ
013Х	Day 1	06:44	06:49	Ush-Tobe	22:50	22:55	Day 2	014ЦТ
013Х	Day 1	08:27	08:41	Matay	20:46	21:01	Day 2	014ЦТ
013Х	Day 1	10:52	11:22	Aqtogai	17:58	18:34	Day 2	014ЦТ
013Х	Day 1	13:36	13:51	Beskol	15:30	15:45	Day 2	014ЦТ
013Х	Day 1	14:45	14:50	Akshi	14:31	14:36	Day 2	014ЦТ
013Х	Day 1	15:45	15:50	Zalangaskol	13:26	13:31	Day 2	014ЦТ
013Х/K9796	Day 1	16:35	19:50	Dostyk	09:20	12:40	Day 2	K9795/014ЦТ
↑ Kazakhstan（KST UTC+06:00） / China（CST UTC+08:00） ↓
K9796	Day 1	22:10	23:50	Alashankou	08:00	11:00	Day 2	K9795
K9796	Day 2	08:48	—	Urumqi	—	23:33	Day 1	K9795

=== CR shift ===
K9795/104ЦА				Stop	103Ц/K9796			
Train no.	Day	Arrival	Departure	Stop	Departure	Arrival	Day	Train no.
K9795	Day 1	—	23:33	Urumqi	08:48	—	Day 2	K9796
K9795	Day 2	09:30	09:42	Yining	00:13	00:18	Day 2	K9796
K9795/104ЦА	Day 2	11:19	17:00	Khorgos	18:52	23:25	Day1	103Ц/K9796
104ЦА	Day 2	17:07	17:10	Khorgos Checkpoint	18:42	18:45	Day1	103Ц
↑ China（CST UTC+08:00） / Kazakhstan（KST UTC+06:00） ↓
104ЦА	Day 2	15:30	16:50	Altynkol Checkpoint	14:56	16:22	Day 1	103Ц
104ЦА	Day 2	17:10	17:50	Altynkol	14:09	14:36	Day 1	103Ц
104ЦА	Day 2	22:59	—	Almaty 2	—	08:59	Day 1	103Ц

== Incidents ==
On 8 November 1995, a shunting locomotive nearly crashed into the train at Alashankou station due to driver failure. No casualties caused in the incident.

== See also ==
- China Railways K9789/9790
- China Railways K9797/9798
- New Eurasia Landbridge
