= China Railways DF5 =

Chinese diesel-electric locomotive class

Dongfeng 5 东风5
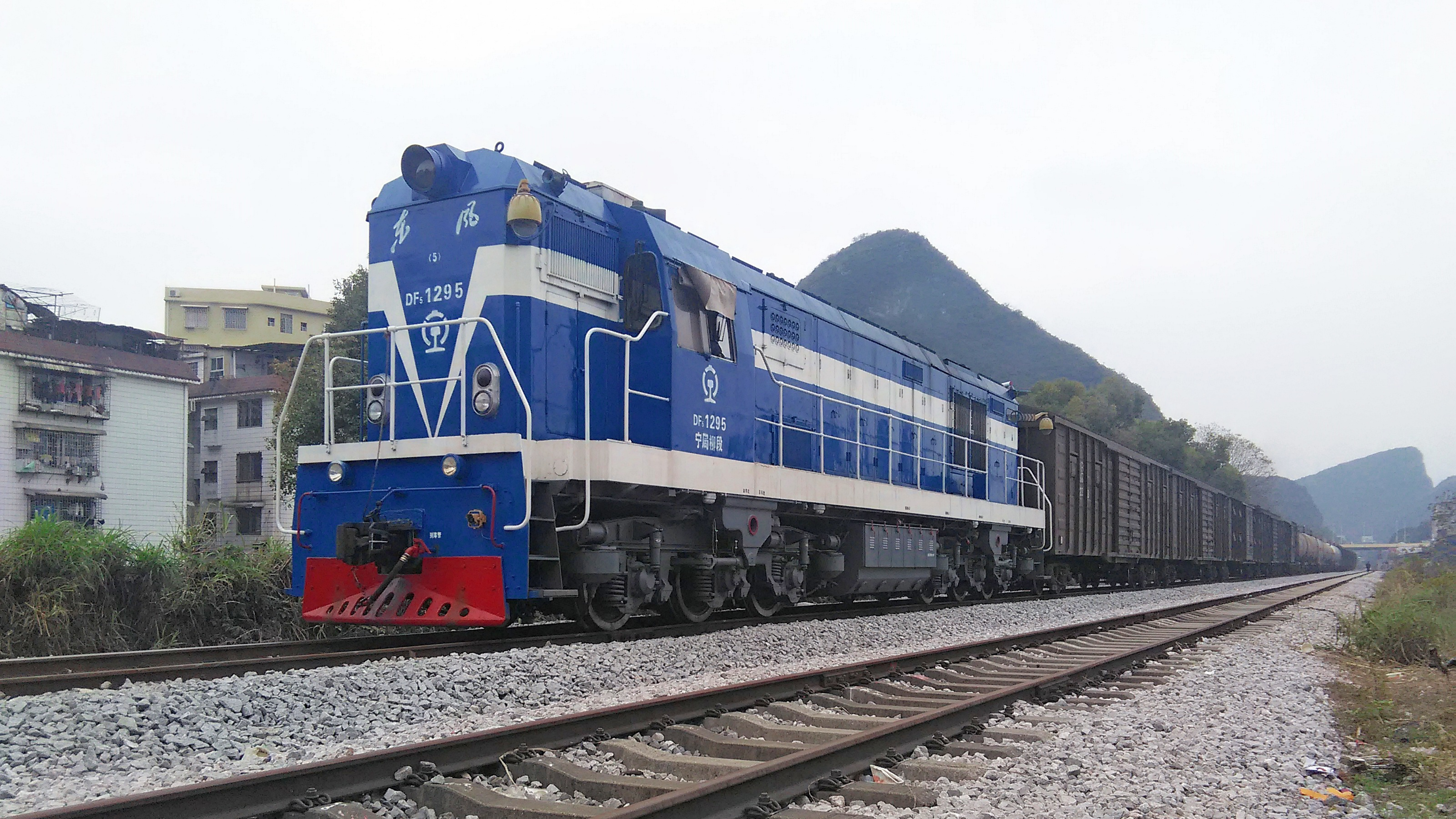
- DF5-1295 in Guilin.
Type and origin
- Power type: Diesel-electric
- Builder: Tangshan Locomotive Works; Dalian Locomotive Works; Sifang Locomotive Works; China
- Model: DF5
- Build date: 1976 - 2006
- Total produced: 1136
Specifications
- Configuration
  - UIC: Co′Co′
- Gauge: 1,435 mm (4 ft 8 1/2 in)
- Minimum curve: 100 m (328 ft 1 in); Modified: 138 m (452 ft 9 in)
- Length: 18,000 mm (59 ft 1 in); Modified:18,400 mm (60 ft 4 in)
- Width: 3,285 mm (10 ft 9.3 in)
- Height: 4,752 mm (15 ft 7.1 in); Modified:4,648 mm (15 ft 3.0 in)
- Axle load: 23 t (51,000 lb)
- Loco weight: 138 t (304,000 lb)
- Fuel type: Diesel
- Fuel capacity: 5,700 L (1,500 US gal)
- Water cap.: 800 L (210 US gal)
- Prime mover: 8240ZJ/C
- Aspiration: Turbocharged
- Generator: TQFR-3000
- Traction motors: 6× ZQDR-410
- Cylinders: 8
- Cylinder size: 240 mm (9.4 in) bore 275 mm (10.8 in) stroke
- Transmission: electric (AC/DC)
Performance figures
- Maximum speed: 80 km/h (50 mph); Modified:100 km/h (62 mph)
- Power output: 1,320 kW (1,770 hp)
- Tractive effort
  - Starting: 392.500 kN (88,238 lbf); Modified: 435.000 kN (97,792 lbf)
  - Continuous: 315.000 kN (70,815 lbf); Modified: 324.000 kN (72,838 lbf)
Career
- Operators: China Railway; (North Korea) Korean State Railway
- Numbers: DF5 0001-0032 (CR); DF5 1001-2083 (CR); DF5 4001-4011 (CR); DF5 5001-5015 (CR); 내연101-108 (KSR)
- Nicknames: "Earthquake" (early models only) "QJ Killer"

The DF5 (Chinese: 东风5 (Dōngfēng 5) or "East Wind") is a diesel-electric locomotive used by China Railway in the People's Republic of China. It has been in production since 1976 and was still produced as of 2006 by several local companies. It is the most common road switcher locomotive in China and is used for yard and road switching duties. A small number are also in service with the Korean State Railway in North Korea.

== Production History ==
In 1975, to meet a need for new and more powerful switchers, the Tangshan Locomotive & Rolling Stock Works, the Dalian Locomotive Works and the Dalian Locomotive Research Institute began a cooperative development effort on a new engine based on the 16V240ZJ diesel engine used in the Dongfeng 4, to be used in the development of a new locomotive, the DF5.

By the end of 1975, the Tangshan and Dalian plants completed a successful trial of the first Model 8240Z inline 8-cylinder diesel engine, including a variety of performance tests and a 100-hour reliability test; the 8240Z was essentially half of a 16V240ZJ, producing 1,230 kilowatts (1,650 hp). In January 1976, the first DF5, DF5 0001, was rolled out at Tangshan. The DF5 has many features in common with the DF4, such as the bogies, the electrical system and other major components. DF5 0001 subsequently underwent testing at Fengtai West Station yard, which provided data for further enhancements to improve the performance and reliability of the locomotive.

On 26 July 1976, the day before the Tangshan earthquake, the second unit, DF5 0002, was completed. The factory was severely damaged in the quake, and over 1,700 employees were killed; despite this, less than two months later, in September 1976 the second unit left the factory, and production work resumed. Between the end of 1976 and 1979, a temporary facility was erected at the Tangshan plant, where 25 DF5s were then produced. This early batch of DF5s has since been nicknamed "Earthquake." By 1981, the Tangshan plant had produced 32 locomotives of this type.

The units produced immediately after the earthquake suffered from relatively poor quality of the main components, the poor matching of the turbocharger with the diesel engine, poor performance and other problems. To further improve the DF5, the Ministry of Railways halted the production of DF5s at Tangshan, the Dalian Locomotive Works began work on redesigning the locomotive and the 8240Z diesel engine.

In 1983, the Dalian works redesigned the 8-cylinder inline 8240Z, turning it into a V8 with equal performance, designated 8240ZJ; in 1984, the first Dalian-built unit, DF5 1001, left the factory and was assigned to the Jinan locomotive depot for service testing. The redesigned locomotive not only eliminated the excessive vibration and other shortcomings, but improved significantly upon the initial and continuous tractive effort.

By an order of the Industrial Development Bureau of the Ministry of Railways, the improved DF5 was ordered into full serial production at the Qingdao Sifang Locomotive Works.

From 1994, new DF5s were built with the improved 8240ZJC engine, producing 1,320 kilowatts (1,770 hp); a total of 251 were built (numbers 1701 to 1951). In 1989, Sifang produced 26 units for operation along the Sino-Soviet border. Of these, eleven (numbers 4001 to 4011) were built for operation on Russian-gauge track (1,524 millimetres (5 ft 0 in)), the remaining 25 (numbers 5001-5015) were for standard-gauge use. These are assigned to the locomotive depots at Ürümqi, Jining and Mudanjiang.

In 2001, Sifang developed a much improved version of the DF5 that addressed many of the problems associated with the previous types. By 2006, 132 locomotives of the new design had been built (numbers 1952 to 2083).

As of 2006, Tangshan, Dalian and Sifang have produced over 1,100 locomotives of class DF5 between them.

Running numbers	Quantity	Builder	Build years	Remarks	Photo
0001-0032	32	Tangshan	1976-1981		DF5-0007 at the Beijing Railway Museum
1001	1	Dalian	1984		
1002-1700	699	Sifang	1984-1994		DF5-1134
1701-1951	251	Sifang	1994-2001	8240ZJC diesel engine	DF5-1765 at Xinjin
1952-2083	132	Sifang	2001-2006	Improved DF5	DF5-2025 at Nanchang
4001-4011	11	Sifang	1989-1991	Broad-gauge border type	
5001-5015	15	Sifang	1989-1991	Standard-gauge border type	
6001-6005	5	Dalian	1991	For Liaoning Jinxi Natural Gas Chemical Plant	DF5-6004 at Fuquan

== Preserved units ==
- DF5 0007 at the Beijing Railway Museum;
- DF5 0011 as an instructional unit and Shandong Vocational College;
- DF5 1043 at the Shenyang Railway Museum.

== North Korean service ==
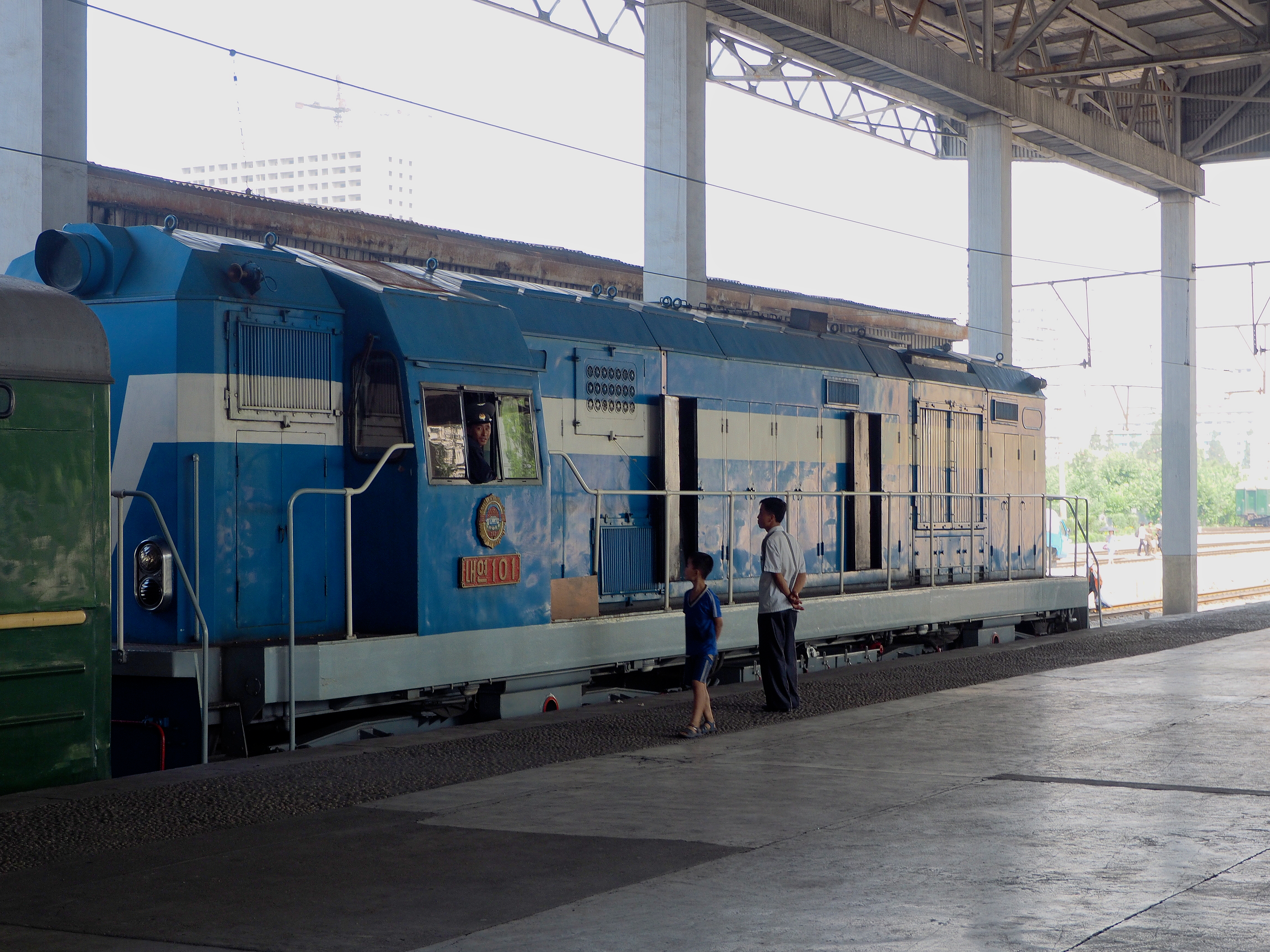
내연101 at P'yŏngyang Central Station.

At least eight units have been delivered second-hand to the Korean State Railway, where they work on local passenger and freight as well as shunting duties around North Korea, including at P'yŏngyang and Namyang. They are numbered 내연101 to 내연108 (내연 = Naeyŏn, "internal combustion") and retain the blue and white China Railway livery.
