= Harbin–Bei'an railway =

Railway line in Heilongjiang Province, China

Binbei Railway
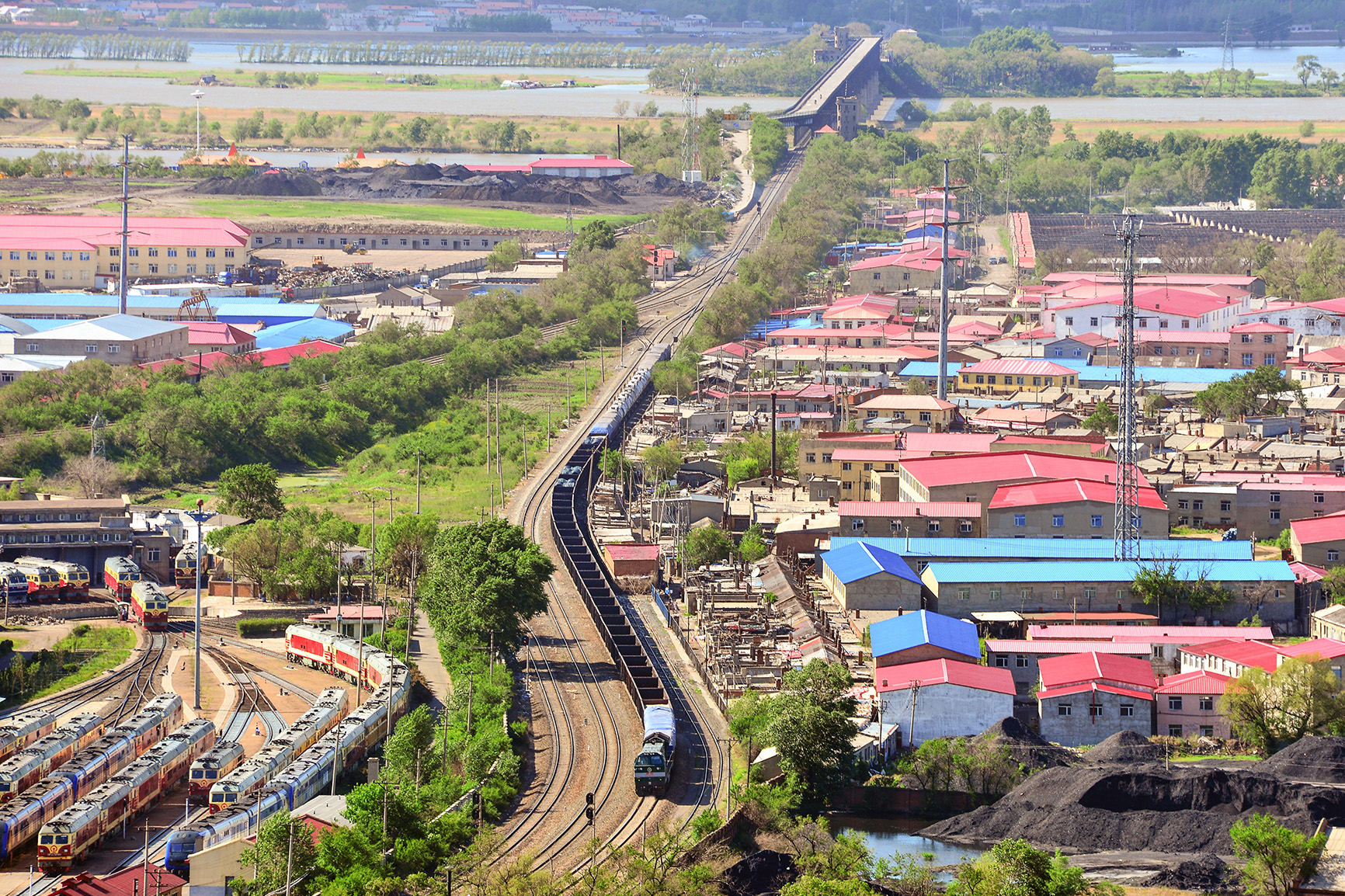
- The Dongjiang Bridge over the Songhua River on the Binbei Railway.

Overview
- Native name: 滨北铁路 (Bīnběi Tiělù)
- Status: Operational
- Owner: Huhai Railway (1928–1933); Haike Railway (1932–1933); Manchukuo National Railway (1933–1945); China Changchun Railway (1945–1955); China Railway (since 1955)
- Locale: Heilongjiang Province
- Termini: Harbin; Bei'an
- Stations: 17

Service
- Type: Heavy rail, Regional rail

History
- Opened: 15 December 1928 (Songpu–Hailun); 1 December 1932 (Hailun–Bei'an)

Technical
- Line length: 333 km (207 mi)
- Track gauge: 1,435 mm (4 ft 8 1/2 in) standard gauge

Harbin-Bei'an railway, named the Binbei Railway (simplified Chinese: 滨北铁路; traditional Chinese: 濱北鐵路; pinyin: Bīnběi Tiělù), is a 333 km (207 mi) double-tracked arterial railroad in Northeast China between Harbin and Bei'an. At Harbin the line connects to the Jingha Railway, the Binzhou Railway, and the Binsui Railway, whilst at Suihua it connects to the Suijia Railway and at Bei'an it connects to the Qibei Railway and the Beihei Railway.

== History ==
The Harbin–Bei'an railway started out as two separate railway lines built by two privately owned railway companies, the Huhai Railway and the Haike Railway.

The Huhai Railway was the first self-funded privately owned railway company in Heilongjiang. It began surveying a line from Songpu to Hailun in September 1925, opening the 227 km (141 mi) line on 15 December 1928. In 1929, the railway's wooden bridge was replaced with a permanent iron bridge. Work on the Haike Railway's line from Hailun to Bei'an began in June 1932, and was opened to traffic on a temporary basis in 1 December of the same year.

In 1933, after the creation of the Japanese puppet state of Manchukuo, both companies were nationalised by the Manchukuo National Railway, and the two companies' lines were merged to create a single line, called the Binbei Line (Hinboku Line in Japanese). The Manchukuo National continued construction of the Hailun–Bei'an section, replacing the temporary bridges with permanent ones. The line was finally completed in 1935.

In August 1945, the Soviet Army invaded Manchukuo, taking over management of all railways in the former Manchukuo, creating the China Changchun Railway; the Binbei Line was put under the jurisdiction of the Qiqihar Railway Bureau. The Soviets transferred control of the China Changchun Railway to China in 1955, at which time this line became part of the China Railway system. In 1957, the line was transferred to the jurisdiction of the Harbin Railway Bureau, and double-tracking of the 125 km (78 mi) Sankeshu–Suihua section of the line was completed. Double-tracking of the rest of the line was completed in 1962.

== Route ==
Distance		Station name			
Total; km	S2S; km	Current name	Former name	Year opened	Connections
0	0	Harbin East 哈尔滨东		1934	Jingha Railway, Binzhou Railway, Binsui Railway
13	13	New Songpu 新松浦		1933	
		~~North Songpu~~; ~~北松浦~~	~~Songpu~~; ~~松浦~~	1926	Closed
22	9	Xujia 徐家	1926		
32	10	Hulan 呼兰		1926	
		~~Majia~~ 马家		1926	Closed
47	15	Shenjia 沈家		1927	
59	12	Kangjinjing 康金井		1927	
72	13	Shirencheng 石人城		1927	
85	13	Baikuibao 白奎堡		1927	
97	12	Xinglongzhen 兴隆镇		1927	
108	11	Wanfatun 万发屯		1928	
		~~Nihe~~; ~~泥河~~		1928	Closed
125	17	Suihua 绥化		1928	Suijia Railway
138	13	Shayuan 沙园		1928	
143	5	Qinjia 秦家		1928	
157	14	Sifangtai 四方台		1928	
173	16	Zhangweitun 张维屯		1928	
~~184~~	~~11~~	~~Xinquan~~; ~~新泉~~		1928	Closed
195	22	Suileng 绥棱		1929	
		~~Keyinhe~~; ~~克音河~~		1929	Closed
215	20	East Bianjing 东边井		1929	
227	12	Hailun 海伦		1925	
		~~Zhaojia~~ 赵家		1932	Closed
242	15	Zhayinhe 扎音河		1932	
254	12	Haibei 海北		1932	
269	15	Tongbei 通北		1932	
277	8	Yangjia 杨家		1932	
290	13	Lijia 李家		1932	
306	16	Zhaoguang 赵光		1932	
		~~Fu'an~~ 福安		1932	Closed
333	27	Bei'an 北安		1932	Qibei Railway and the Beihei Railway
