= China Railway Harbin Group =

Subsidiary of China Railway

China Railway Harbin Bureau Group Co., Ltd.
- Type: state-owned enterprise
- Industry: Railway operations
- Predecessor: Harbin Railway Administration
- Founded: 19 November 2017
- Headquarters: 51 Xida Main Street, Nangang, Harbin, Heilongjiang, China
- Area served: Heilongjiang eastern Inner Mongolia
- Owner: Government of China
- Parent: China Railway
- Website: Official Weibo Website

China Railway Harbin Group
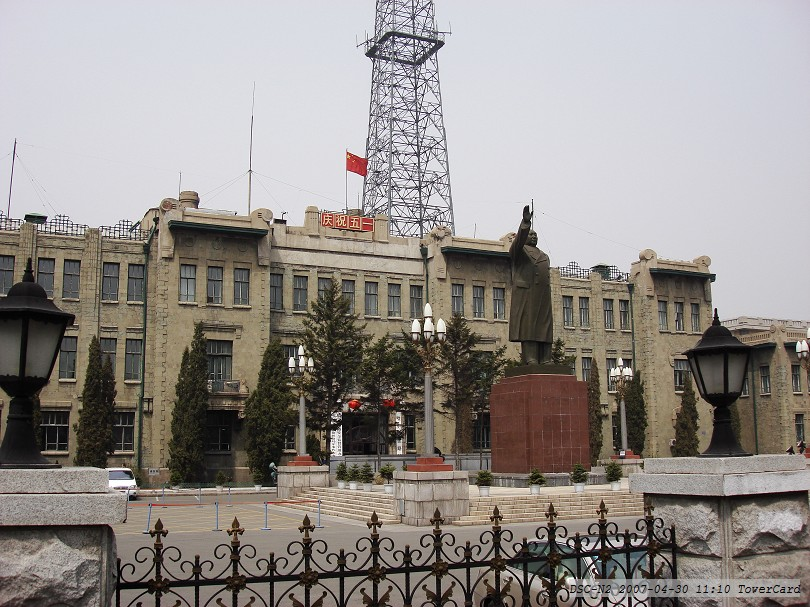
- Headquarter of CR Harbin
- Simplified Chinese: 中国铁路哈尔滨局集团
- Traditional Chinese: 中國鐵路哈爾濱局集團
Transcriptions
Standard Mandarin
- Hanyu Pinyin: Zhōngguó Tiělù Hā'ěrbīn Jú Jítuán

Harbin Railway Administration
- Simplified Chinese: 哈尔滨铁路局
- Traditional Chinese: 哈爾濱鐵路局
Transcriptions
Standard Mandarin
- Hanyu Pinyin: Hā'ěrbīn Tiělù Jú

CR Harbin
- Simplified Chinese: 哈铁
- Traditional Chinese: 哈鐵
Transcriptions
Standard Mandarin
- Hanyu Pinyin: Hātiě

China Railway Harbin Group, officially abbreviated as CR Harbin or CR-Harbin, formerly the Harbin Railway Administration, is a subsidiary company under the jurisdiction of the corporatized China Railway (formerly the Ministry of Railway). The railway administration was reorganized as a company in November 2017.

It supervises the railway network within Heilongjiang, and eastern Inner Mongolia.

== Hub stations ==
- Harbin
  - Harbin, Harbin West
- Qiqihar
  - Qiqihar, Sanjianfang
- Mudanjiang
  - Mudanjiang
- Jiamusi
  - Jiamusi

== Routes ==
- K265/266 Beijing-Jiamusi Through Train
- K339/340 Beijing-Jiamusi Through Train
- K7001/7002 Harbin-Mudanjiang Through Train
- K7205/7206 Harbin–Baoqing through train
- K7173/7174 Harbin–Jixi through train
- K7017/7018 Harbin–Wuyiling through train
- K7019/7020 Harbin–Hebei through train
- K7027/7028 Harbin–Mishan through train
- K7031/7032 Harbin-Suihua Through Train
- K7047/7048 Harbin-Mudanjiang Through Train
- K7051/7052 Harbin-Daqing Through Train
- K7203/7204 Harbin-Jiamusi Through Train
- K7025/7026 Harbin–Qitaihe through train
