= China Railways HXD1D =

Class of Chinese electric locomotives

HXD1D 和谐1D型电力机车
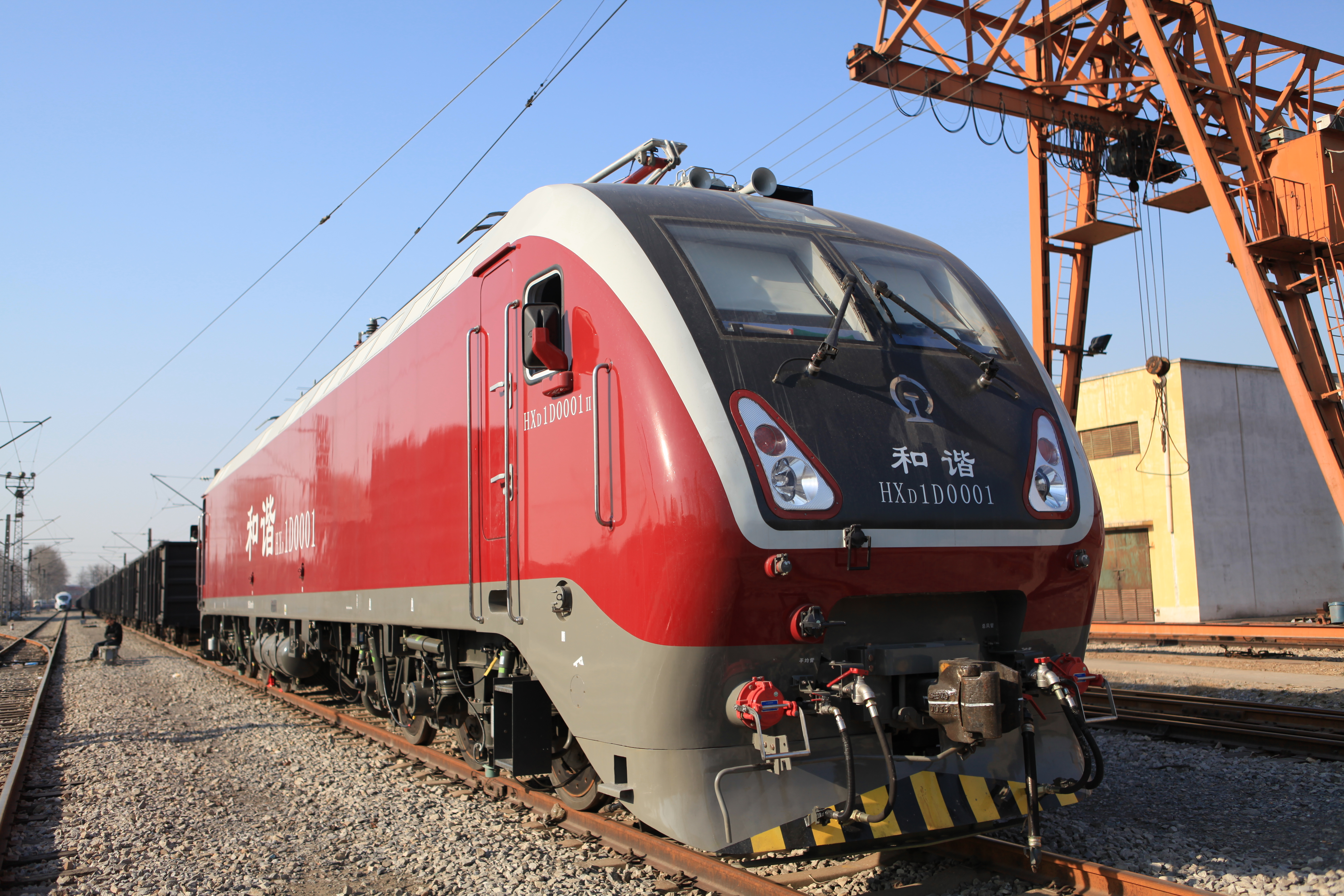
- HXD1D-0001
Type and origin
- Power type: Electric
- Builder: CRRC Zhuzhou Electric Locomotive
- Build date: 2012-present
- Total produced: 511
Specifications
- Configuration
  - UIC: Co'Co'
- Gauge: 1,435 mm (4 ft 8 1/2 in) standard gauge
- Wheel diameter: 1.250 to 1.150 m (4 ft 1.2 in to 3 ft 9.3 in) (new/worn)
- Length: 22.446 m (73 ft 7.7 in) (over couplers)
- Axle load: 21 t (20.7 long tons; 23.1 short tons)
- Adhesive weight: 100%
- Loco weight: 126 t (124 long tons; 139 short tons)
- Electric system/s: 25 kV 50 Hz AC Catenary
- Current pickup: Pantograph
- Traction motors: Six 3-Phase AC traction motors 1,225 kW (1,643 hp) rating
- Transmission: AC-DC-AC
- Train heating: 2x 400 kW (540 hp) @ 600 volts
- Loco brake: regenerative and electro-pneumatic
- Train brakes: Pneumatic
Performance figures
- Maximum speed: 160 km/h (99 mph) (service); 176 km/h (109 mph) (in tests)
- Power output: 7,200 kW (9,700 hp) (continuous)
- Tractive effort: starting 420 kN (94,000 lb_{f}), to 5 km/h (3.1 mph); 324 kN (73,000 lb_{f}) @ 80 km/h (50 mph); 162 kN (36,000 lb_{f}) @ 160 km/h (99 mph)
- Factor of adh.: 2.955 (33.8%)
- Brakeforce: regenerative: 210 kN (47,000 lb_{f}) from 5 to 123 km/h (3.1 to 76.4 mph); 162 kN (36,000 lb_{f}) @ 160 km/h (99 mph)
Career
- Operators: China Railway
- Nicknames: 红枣 天猫
- Sources: except where noted

The HXD1D (Chinese: 和谐1D型电力机车) is a semi-high speed electric locomotive developed by CRRC Zhuzhou Electric Locomotive Co., Ltd in association with the Chinese Ministry of Railways Science and Technology Development department (Chinese: 铁道部科技司). The design was revealed in 2012 - it is a 7,200 kW (9,700 hp) power six axle, 126 t (124 long tons; 139 short tons), Co'Co' locomotive with a top speed of 160 km/h (99 mph). It is capable of accelerating a 3,000-passenger, 20-carriage train to 160 km/h within five minutes.

There is a prototype without numbering, with 9,600 kW (12,900 hp) power and 200 km/h (120 mph) max speed. However it was abandoned as the max speed of main lines was downgraded to 160 km/h (99 mph).

== Gallery ==
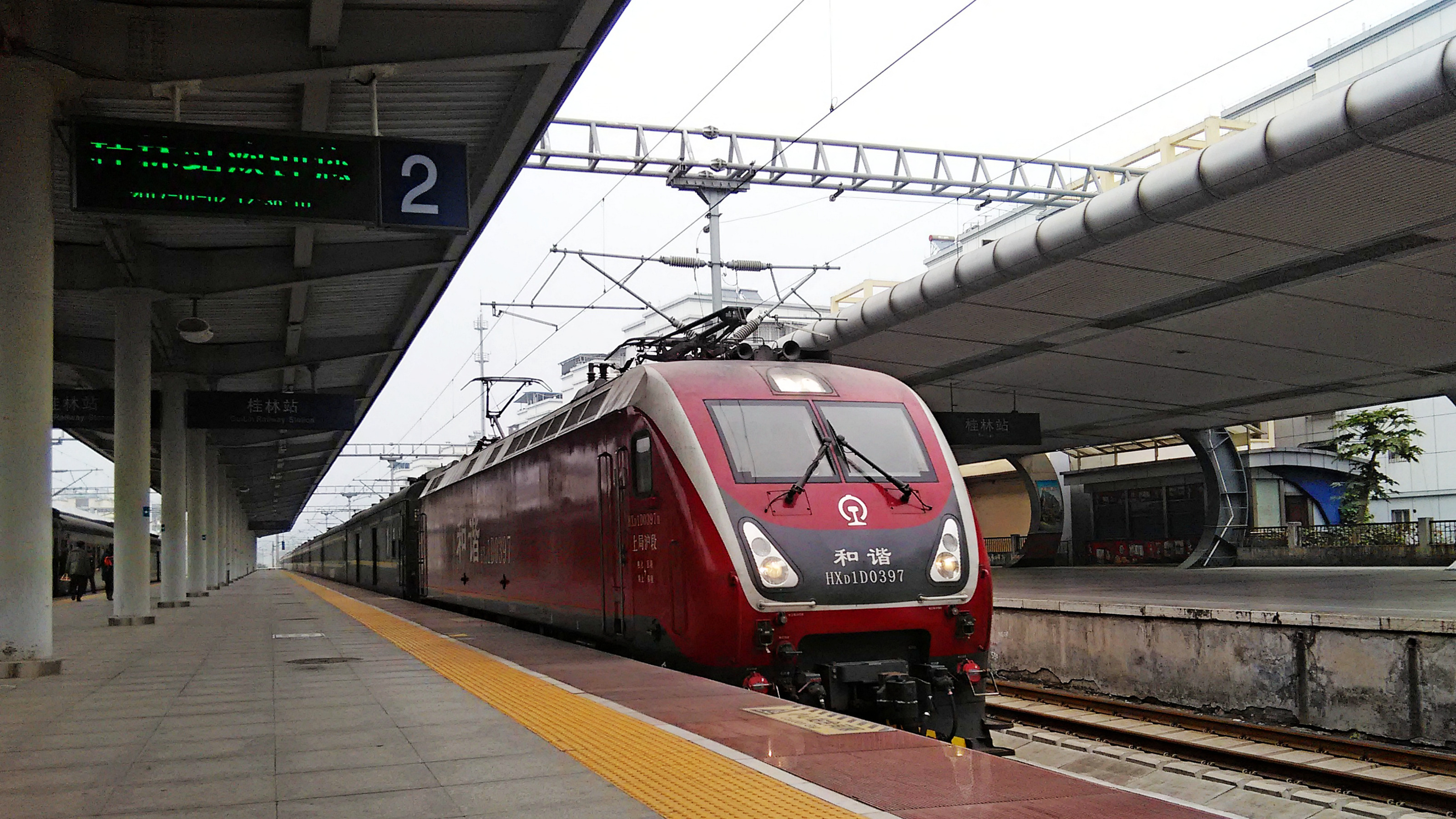
HXD1D-0397 pulling a T381 through passenger train at Guilin Railway Station, Xiangshan District, Guilin.

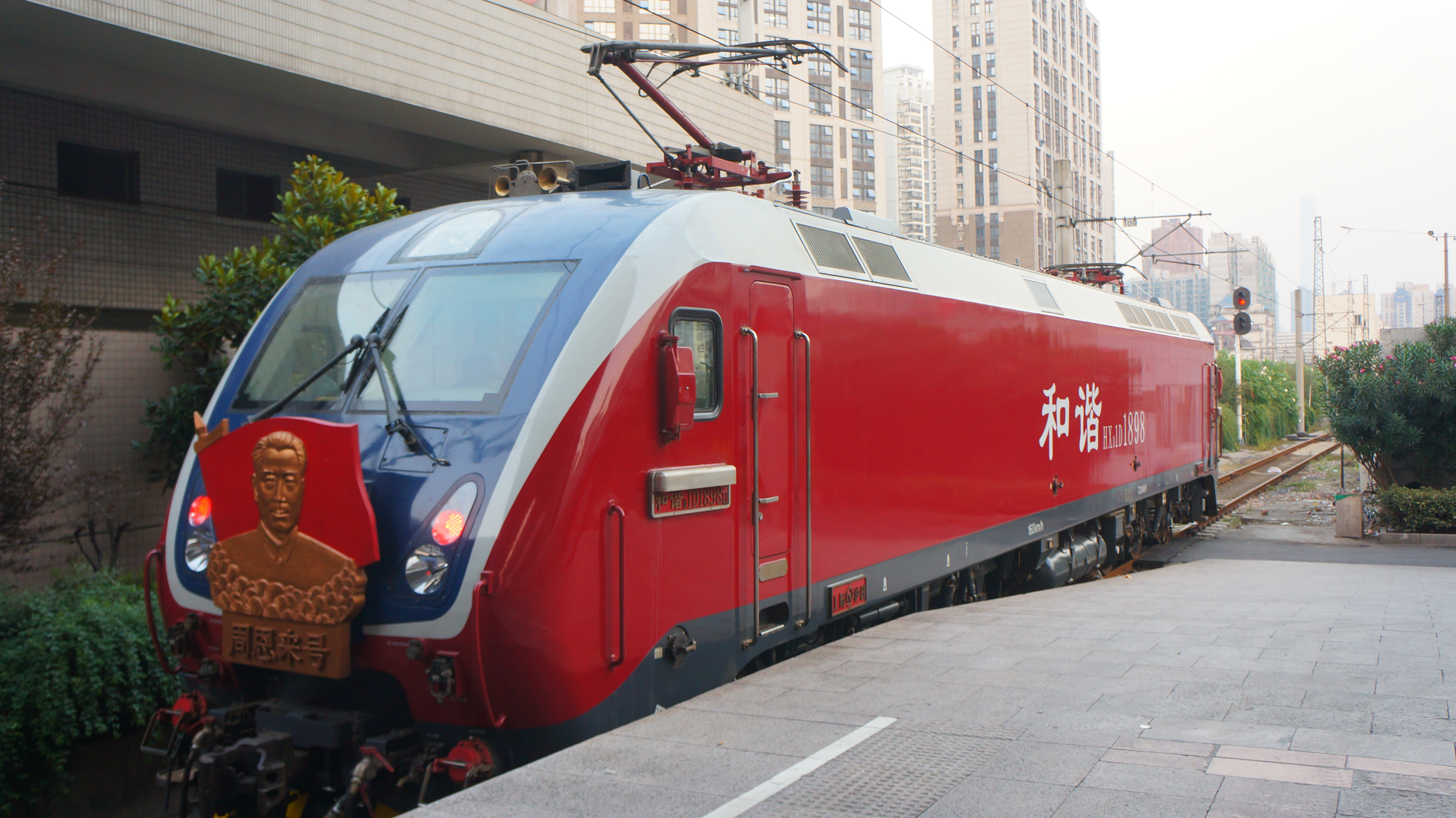
HXD1D-1898, named after Zhou Enlai, at Shanghai railway station.

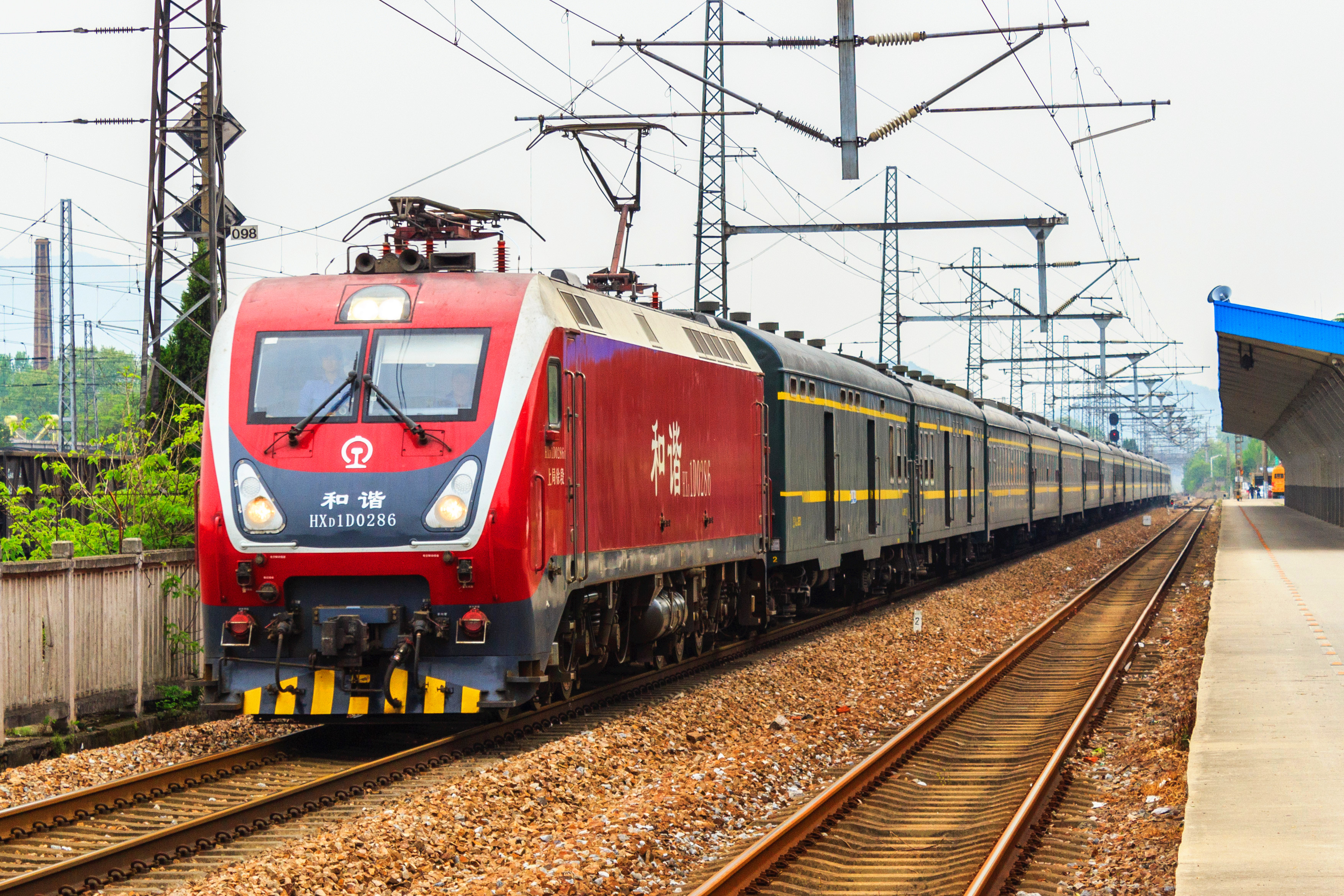
HXD1D-0286 pulling a rapid passenger train at Nanjing East Railway Station.

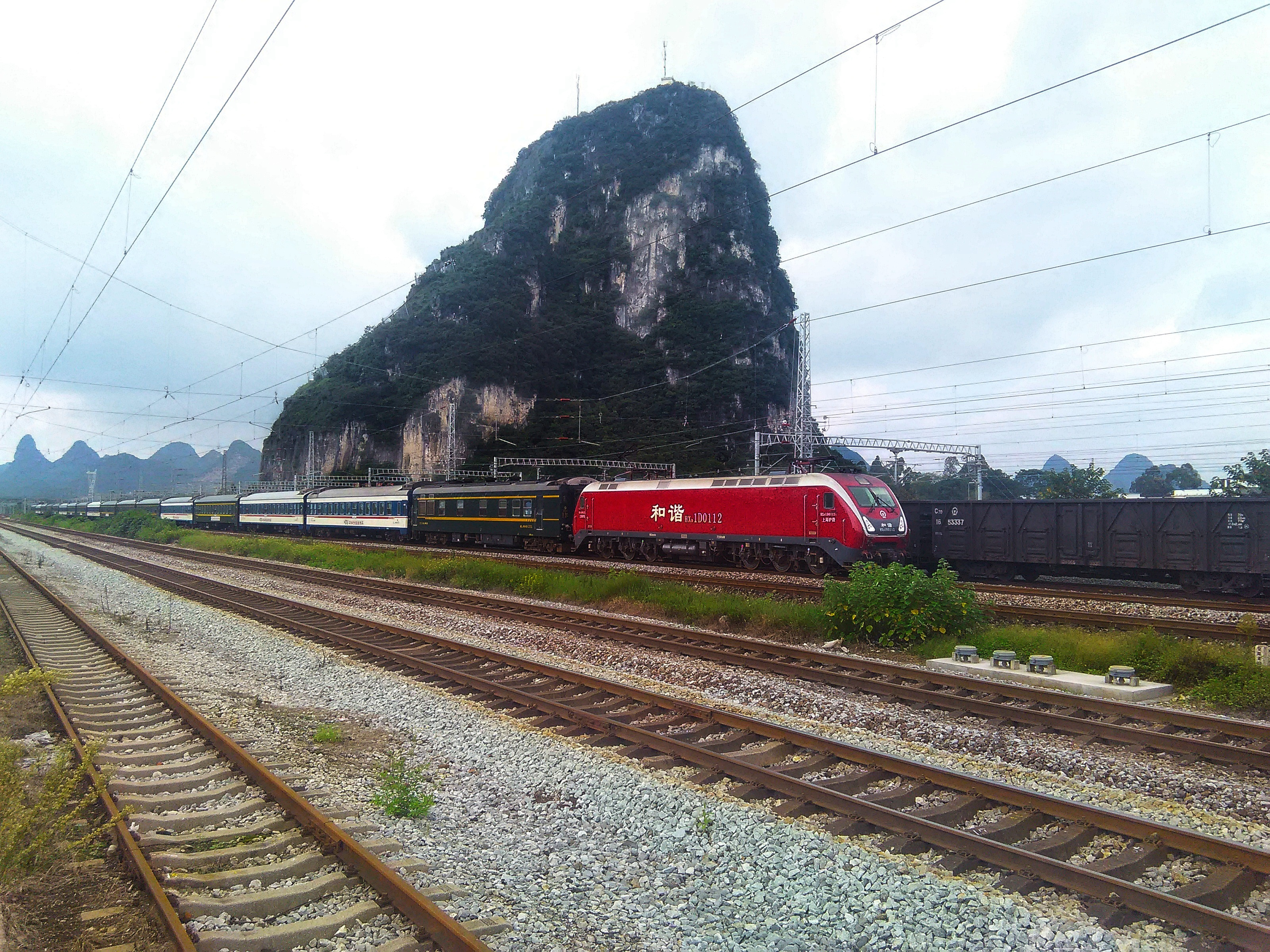
HXD1D-0112 pulling a T382 through passenger train at Jinde Railway Station, Liujiang District, Liuzhou.

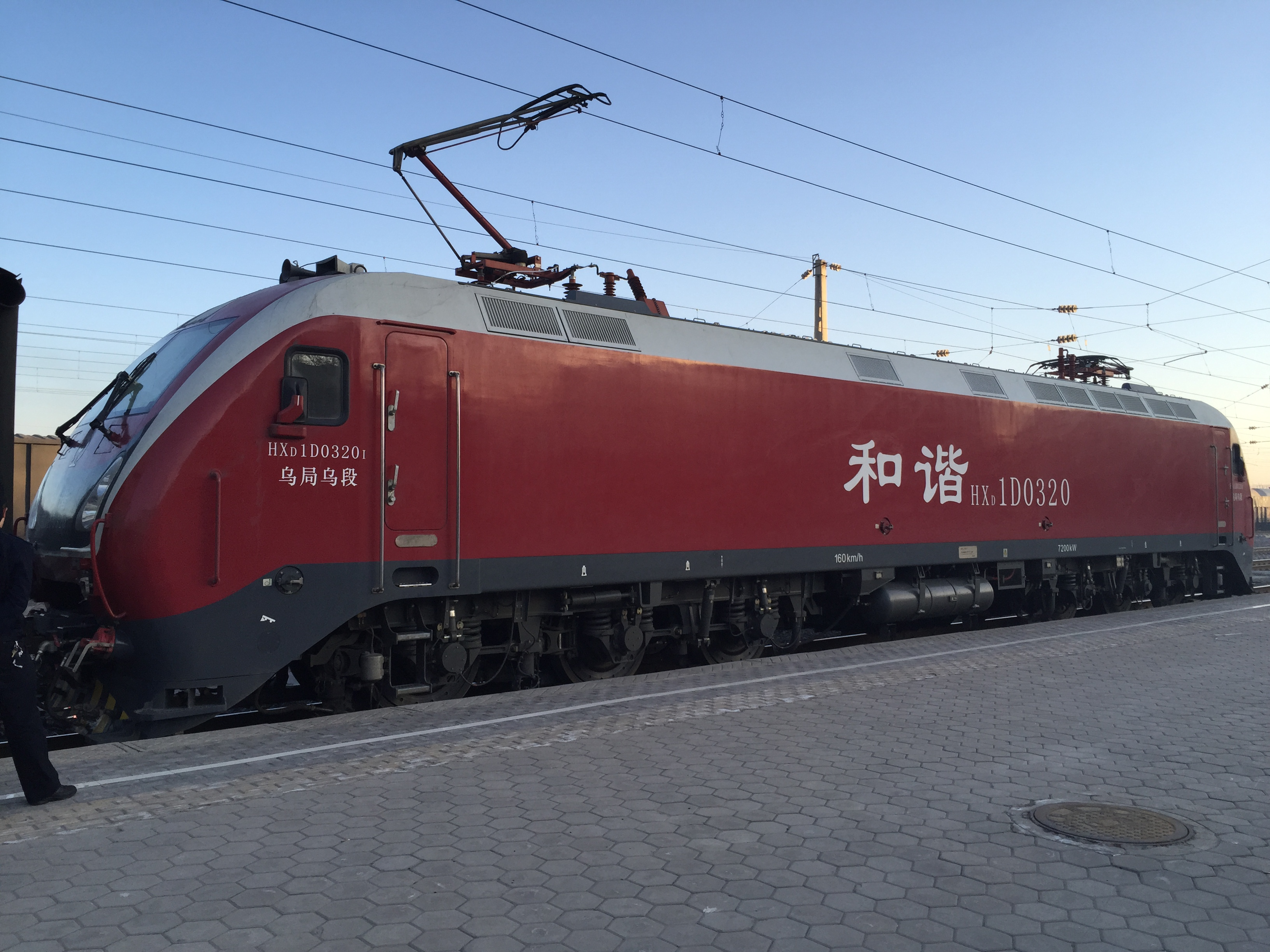
HXD1D-0320 in Zhongwei Railway Station.

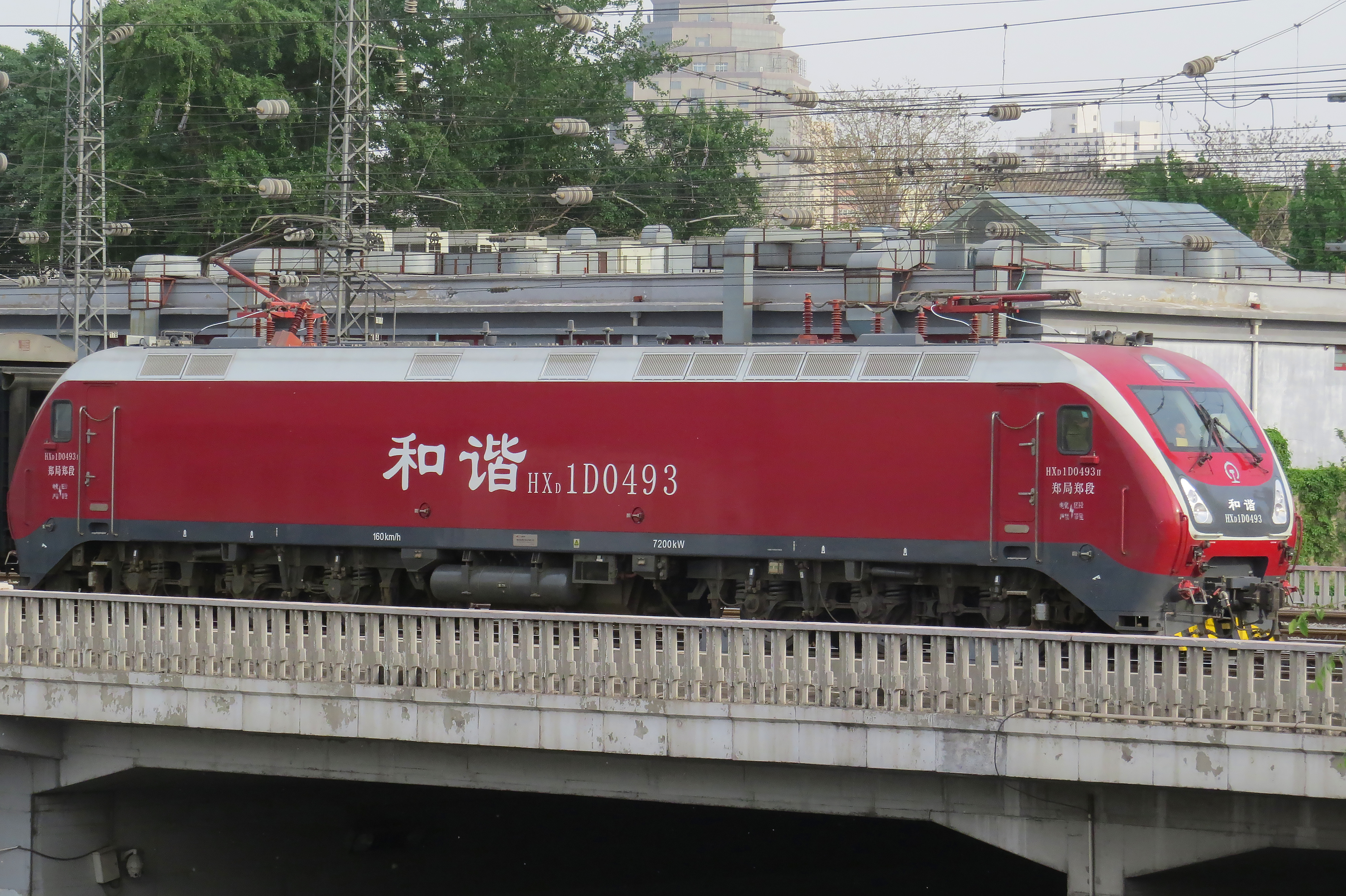
HXD1D-0493 pulling a T49 through passenger train to Enshi.

== Named locomotive ==
- HXD1D-1898: "Zhou Enlai"

== See also ==
- List of locomotives in China
