= Bei'an =

Bei'an 北安市 Pei-an
- County-level city
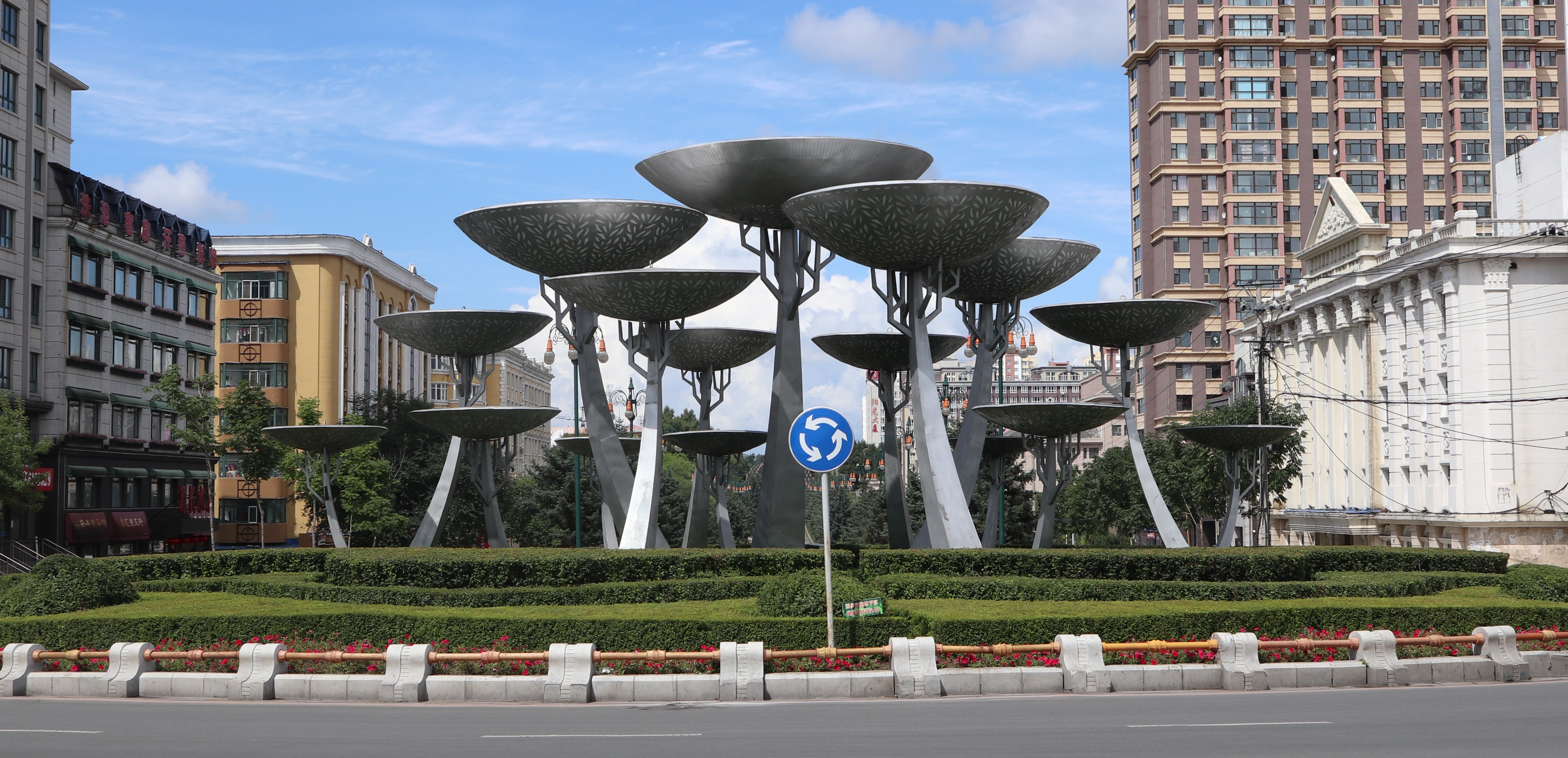
- Sculpture on Longjiang Road, Bei'an

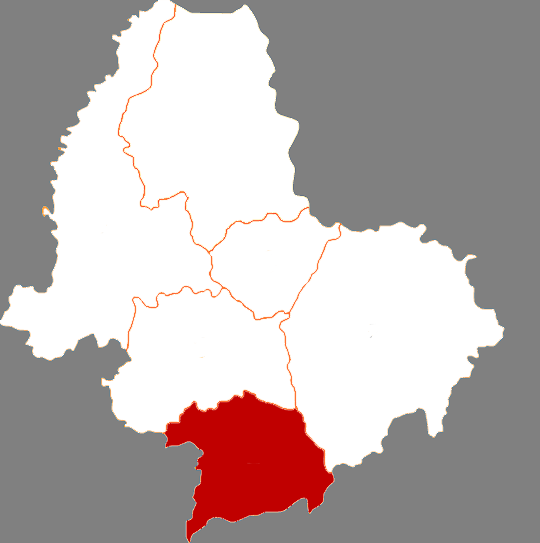
- Location of Bei'an City within Heihe

- Location in Heilongjiang
- Coordinates: 48°15′N 126°31′E
- Country: People's Republic of China
- Province: Heilongjiang
- Prefecture-level city: Heihe
- Township-level divisions: 6 subdistricts 5 towns 4 townships
- Founded: 1910
- Municipal seat: Heping Subdistrict (和平街道)

Area
  - Total: 6,313 km^{2} (2,437 sq mi)
- Elevation: 266 m (873 ft)

Population (2010)
  - Total: 436,444
  - Density: 69.13/km^{2} (179.1/sq mi)
- Time zone: UTC+8 (China Standard)
- Postal code: 164000
- Area code: 0456
- Climate: Dwb
- Website: www.hljba.gov.cn

Bei'an (Chinese: 北安; pinyin: Běi'ān; lit. 'northern peace') is a county-level city in west-central Heilongjiang province in the People's Republic of China. It is under the jurisdiction of Heihe. Bei'an was the provincial capital of Bei'an province of Manchukuo, a puppet state set up by Japan during the Second World War. Bei'an received the unofficial moniker of "Gun City" because it was the location of Factory #626; which mainly manufactured Chinese clones of WW2 firearms and Type 56 rifles. Eventually, it was privatized in the 1980s as the Shougang Kingho Plant until it went bankrupt in 2006. Six years later, a museum detailing the history of Factory #626 opened.

== Administrative divisions ==
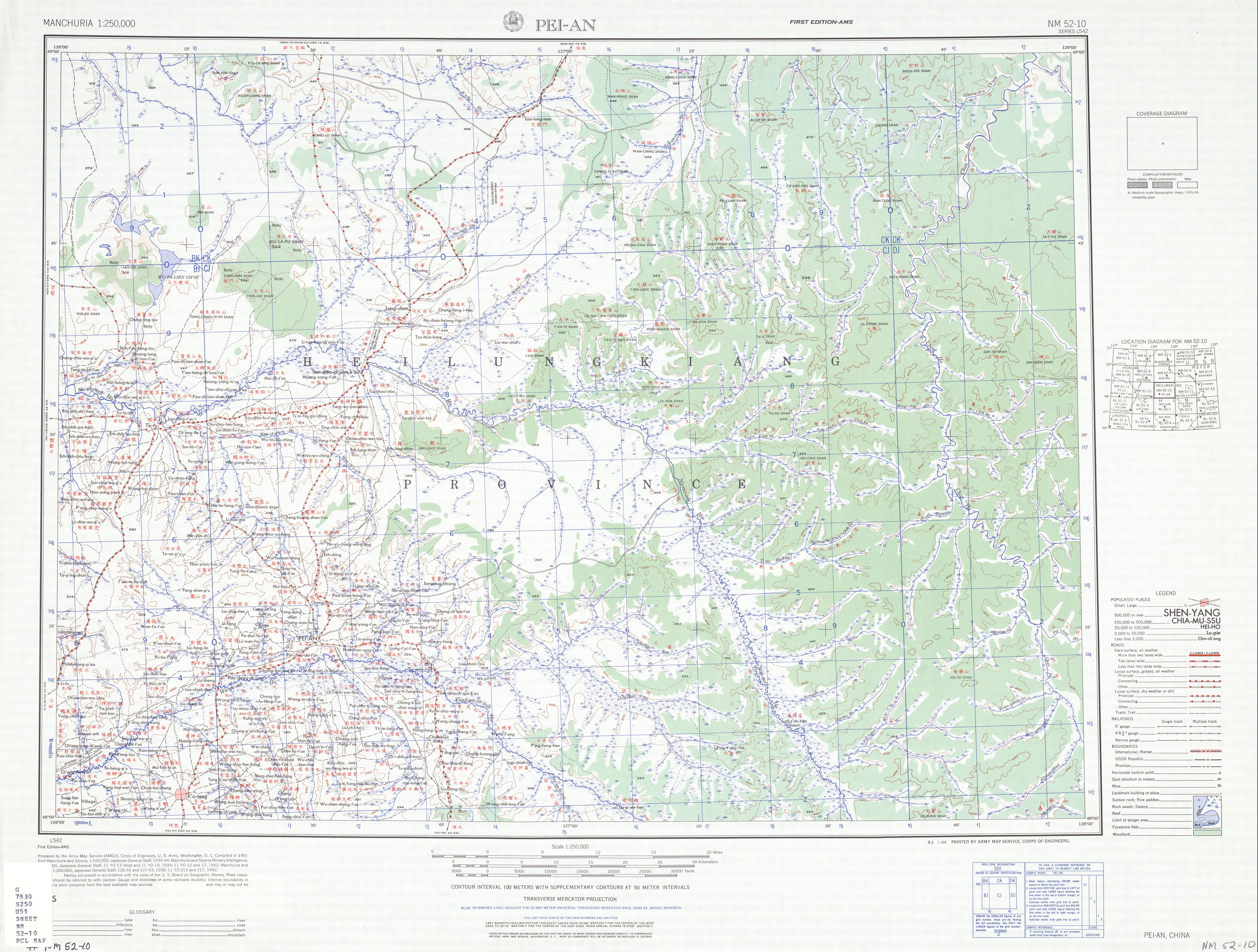
Map including Bei'an (labeled as PEI-AN 北安) (AMS, 1951)

There are six subdistricts, five towns and four townships under the city's administration:

=== Subdistricts ===
- Heping Subdistrict (和平街道)
- Zhaolin Subdistrict (兆麟街道)
- Qinghua Subdistrict (庆华街道)
- Tiexi Subdistrict (铁西街道)
- Tienan Subdistrict (铁南街道)
- Beigang Subdistrict (北岗街道)

=== Towns ===
- Tongbei (通北镇)
- Zhaoguang (赵光镇)
- Shiquan (石泉镇)
- Haixing (海星镇)
- Erjing (二井镇)

=== Townships ===
- Chengjiao Township (城郊乡)
- Dongsheng Township (东胜乡)
- Yangjia Township (杨家乡)
- Zhuxing Township (主星乡)

== Climate ==
Climate data for Bei'an, elevation 278 m (912 ft), (1991–2020 normals, extremes 1981–present)
Month	Jan	Feb	Mar	Apr	May	Jun	Jul	Aug	Sep	Oct	Nov	Dec	Year
Record high °C (°F)	−4.2 (24.4)	6.0 (42.8)	19.4 (66.9)	27.9 (82.2)	33.8 (92.8)	39.1 (102.4)	36.5 (97.7)	34.4 (93.9)	33.8 (92.8)	26.2 (79.2)	13.0 (55.4)	1.4 (34.5)	39.1 (102.4)
Mean daily maximum °C (°F)	−16.6 (2.1)	−10.5 (13.1)	−0.5 (31.1)	11.2 (52.2)	19.8 (67.6)	25.2 (77.4)	26.9 (80.4)	24.9 (76.8)	19.4 (66.9)	9.6 (49.3)	−4.2 (24.4)	−14.9 (5.2)	7.5 (45.5)
Daily mean °C (°F)	−22.7 (−8.9)	−17.5 (0.5)	−6.8 (19.8)	4.9 (40.8)	13.2 (55.8)	19.1 (66.4)	21.7 (71.1)	19.4 (66.9)	12.9 (55.2)	3.5 (38.3)	−9.7 (14.5)	−20.4 (−4.7)	1.5 (34.6)
Mean daily minimum °C (°F)	−27.6 (−17.7)	−23.6 (−10.5)	−13.1 (8.4)	−1.4 (29.5)	6.3 (43.3)	13.0 (55.4)	16.8 (62.2)	14.5 (58.1)	7.0 (44.6)	−1.8 (28.8)	−14.5 (5.9)	−25.0 (−13.0)	−4.1 (24.6)
Record low °C (°F)	−40.9 (−41.6)	−39.3 (−38.7)	−31.5 (−24.7)	−15.3 (4.5)	−6.4 (20.5)	0.7 (33.3)	7.8 (46.0)	2.2 (36.0)	−6.5 (20.3)	−23.3 (−9.9)	−32.1 (−25.8)	−39.2 (−38.6)	−40.9 (−41.6)
Average precipitation mm (inches)	3.0 (0.12)	4.0 (0.16)	8.1 (0.32)	20.9 (0.82)	46.5 (1.83)	102.4 (4.03)	145.7 (5.74)	119.5 (4.70)	67.4 (2.65)	22.0 (0.87)	8.8 (0.35)	5.7 (0.22)	554 (21.81)
Average precipitation days (≥ 0.1 mm)	5.1	3.7	4.4	6.6	10.6	13.7	13.8	13.5	10.1	6.5	6.3	7.0	101.3
Average snowy days	9.0	6.0	7.0	4.1	0.2	0	0	0	0.1	3.4	8.5	10.0	48.3
Average relative humidity (%)	74	71	63	53	54	67	78	80	71	64	70	74	68
Mean monthly sunshine hours	160.3	197.3	251.2	238.9	257.4	251.5	244.7	226.3	220.6	192.4	158.2	134.1	2,532.9
Percentage possible sunshine	58	68	68	58	55	52	51	52	59	58	58	52	57
Source: China Meteorological Administration All-time Oct extreme
