= Harbin East railway station =

Railway station in Heilongjiang Province, China

Haerbindong 哈尔滨东
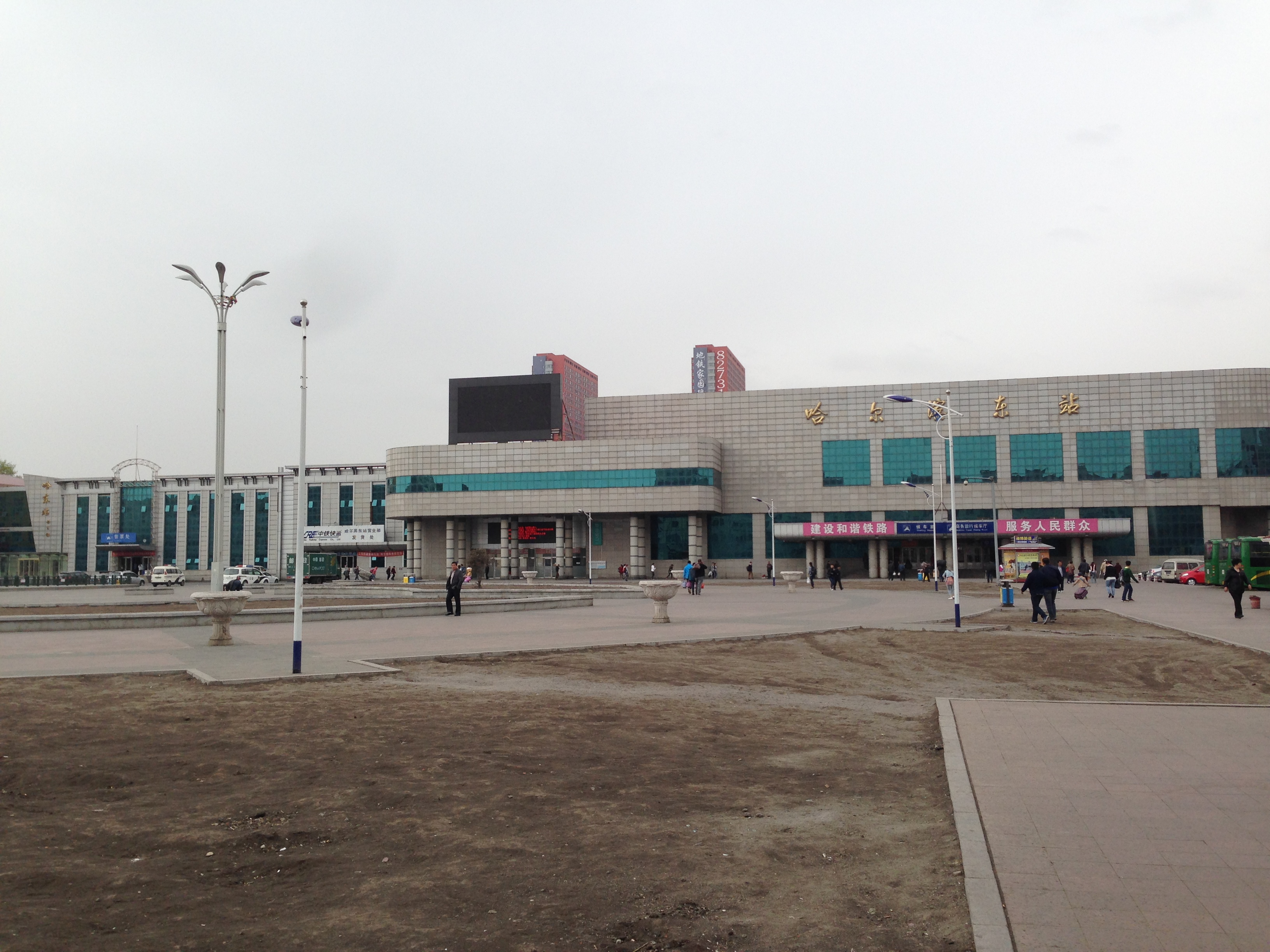

General information
- Other names: Harbin East
- Location: Harbin, Heilongjiang; China
- Coordinates: 45°42′17″N 126°34′23″E
- Operated by: China Railway Corporation
- Line(s): Harbin–Bei'an

Harbin East (Haerbindong) railway station is a railway station located in Daowai District of Harbin, Heilongjiang Province, China. The construction of the station begun in December 1932 and finished in June 1934. The station was expanded in 1987 and 2002. Its former name was Sankeshu Station (Chinese: 三棵树站; pinyin: Sānkēshù Zhàn), and was renamed as Harbin East railway station in 1990 by then Ministry of Railways (China).

The station functions as a major transportation terminal in Heilongjiang Province, and mainly operates normal speed trains to the destinations within the province. Line 1 of Harbin Metro station is located in the west square of the station.

It was renovated significantly in 2016 to coordinate the overhauling of Harbin railway station. However, the capacity of this station is well below that of Harbin railway station and Harbin West Station.

== See also ==
- Chinese Eastern Railway
- South Manchuria Railway
- South Manchuria Railway Zone
- Changchun Light Rail Transit
