= List of high-speed railway lines in China =

Railway network map with conventional lines upgraded or built to accommodate CRH shown in orange, 160–250 km/h (99–155 mph), secondary high-speed lines in green, 200–299 km/h (124–186 mph), and blue, above 300 km/h (190 mph).

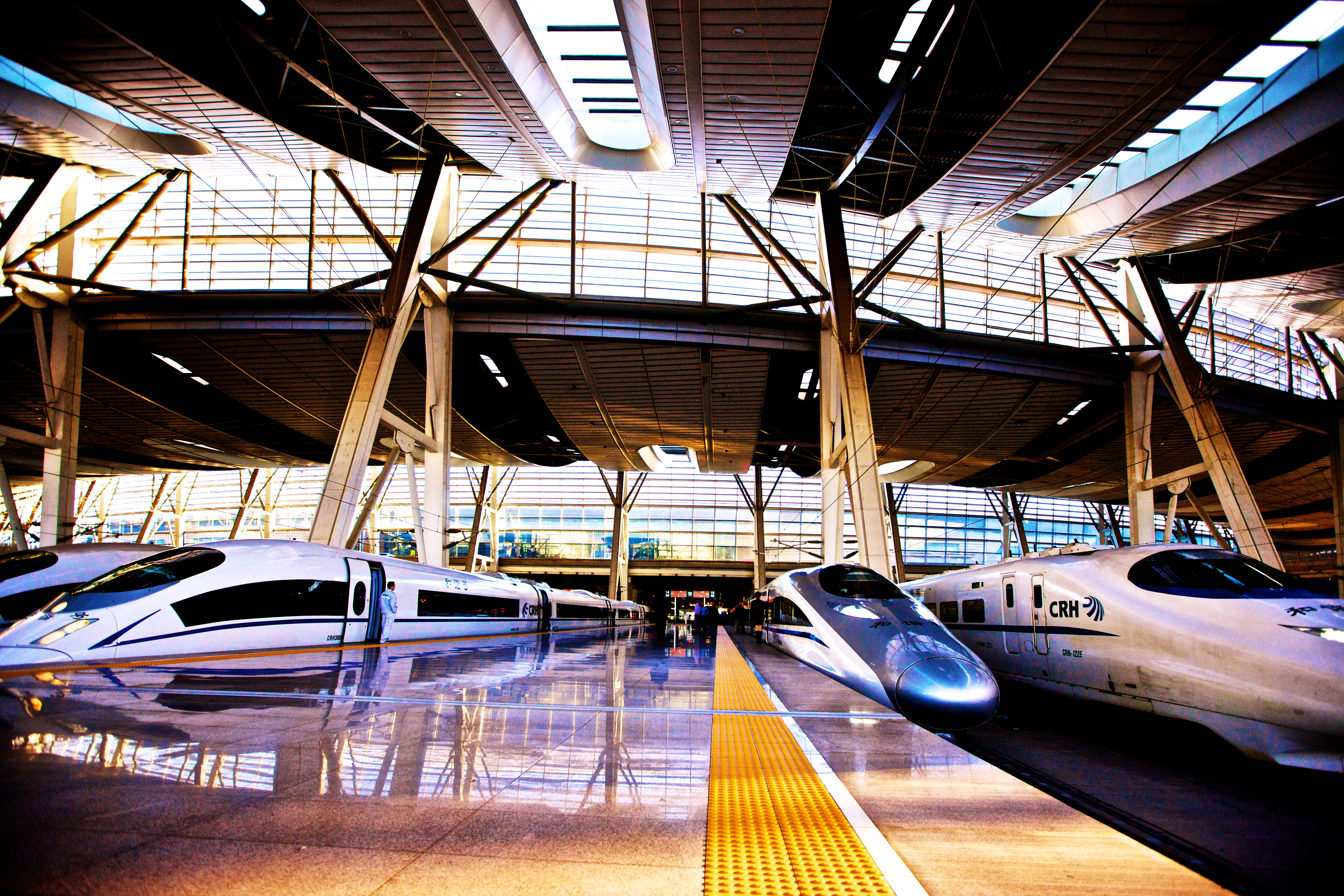
Beijing South railway station

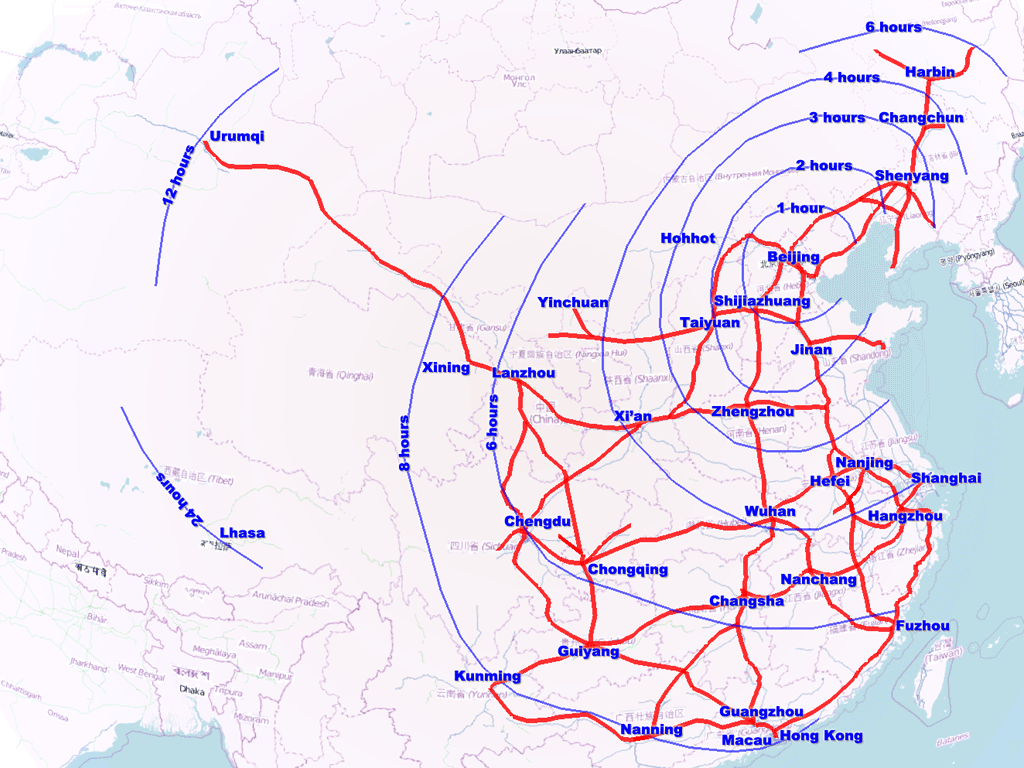
Projected HSR network in China by 2020 and travel time by rail from Beijing to provincial capitals.

China's high-speed rail network is by far the longest in the world. As of December 2025, it extends to 31 of the country's 34 provincial-level administrative divisions and exceeds 50,000 km (31,000 mi) in total length, accounting for about two-thirds of the world's high-speed rail tracks in commercial service. Over the past decade, China's high-speed rail network grew rapidly according to ambitious railway plans issued by the State. The "Mid- to Long-Term Railway Network Plan" ("Railway Network Plan") approved by the State Council in 2004 called for 12,000 km (7,456 mi) of passenger-dedicated HSR lines running train at speeds of at least 200 km/h (124 mph) by 2020. The 2008 Revisions to the Railway Network Plan increased the year 2020 passenger-dedicated HSR network target length to 16,000 km (9,942 mi) and removed the 200 km/h speed standard to allow new lines to be built to standards that can accommodate faster trains.

== Overview ==
In 2008, the Ministry of Railways announced plans to build 25,000 km (16,000 mi) of high-speed railways with trains reaching normal speeds of 350 km/h. China invested $50 billion on its high-speed rail system in 2009 and the total construction cost of the high-speed rail system is $300 billion. The main operator of regular high-speed train services is China Railway High-Speed (CRH).

China's conventional high-speed railway network is made up of four components:

1. a national grid of mostly passenger dedicated HSR lines (PDLs),
2. other regional HSRs connecting major cities,
3. certain regional "intercity" HSR lines, and
4. other newly built or upgraded conventional rail lines, mostly in western China, that can carry high-speed passenger and freight trains.

== National High Speed Rail Grid ==
=== "Four Vertical and Four Horizontal" network ===
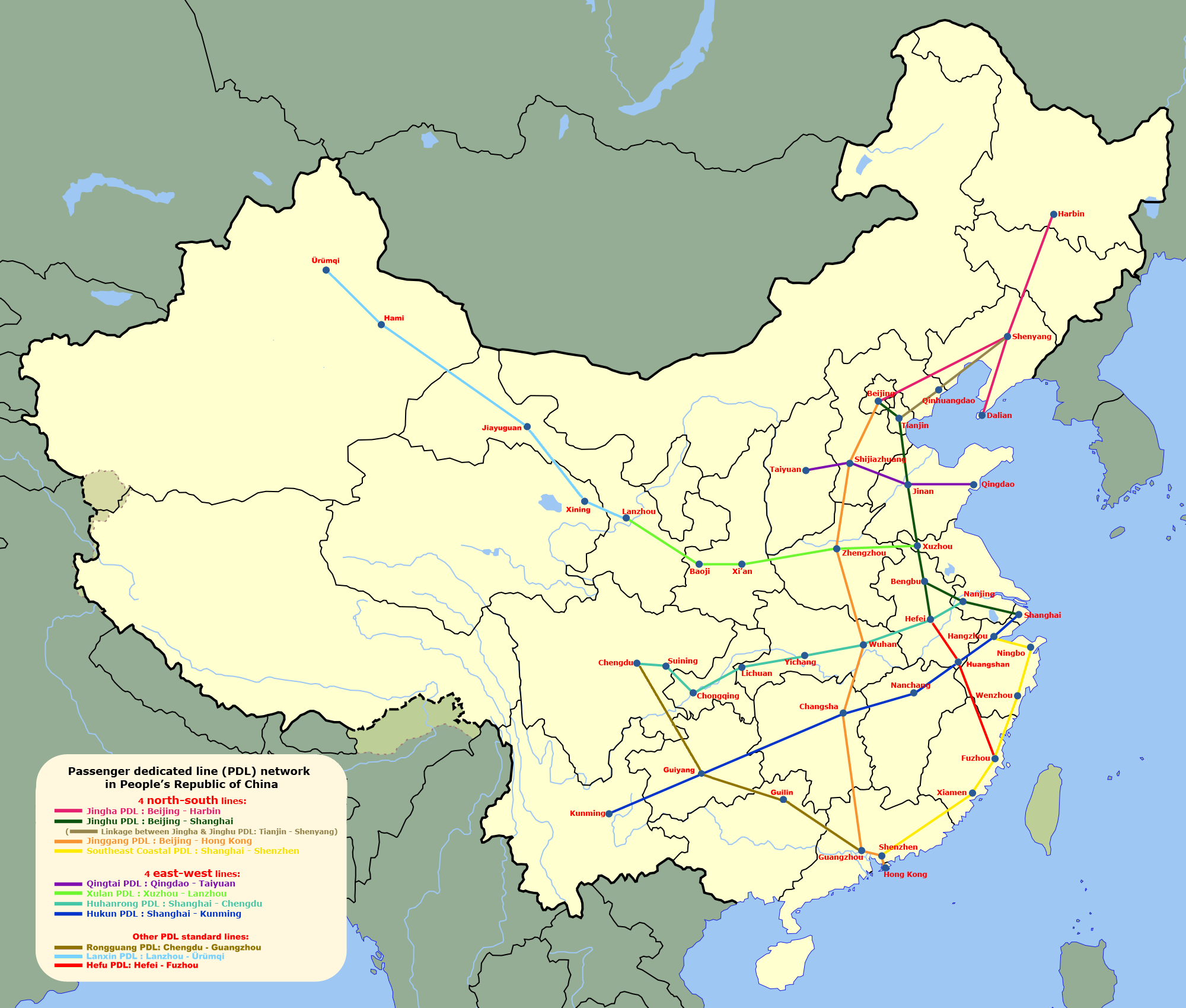
Map showing the 4+4 national HSR grid

The centerpiece of the MOR's expansion into high-speed rail is a national high-speed rail grid that is overlaid onto the existing railway network. The 2004 Railway Network Plan called for four lines running north-south (verticals) and four lines running east-west (horizontals) by the year 2020 that would connect population centers in economically developed regions of the country. The 2008 Revisions to the Railway Network Plan extended the length of the Beijing-Shenzhen HSR to Hong Kong and the Shanghai-Changsha HSR to Kunming. Each line in the 4+4 national HSR grid is over 1,400 km in length, except the Qingdao-Taiyuan Line which is 873 km in length. Apart from the Hangzhou–Shenzhen HSR (Ningbo-Shenzhen section) and Shanghai–Chengdu HSR (Nanjing-Chengdu section), which were the first railways to connect those cities and carry both passenger and freight, the other six lines are all passenger-dedicated lines. With the exception of the Yichang-Chengdu section of the Shanghai-Chengdu HSR with speed limits of 200 km/h (120 mph), all other lines in the 4+4 national grid were built to accommodate trains at speeds of 250–350 km/h (160–220 mph).

With the completion of the Beijing–Shenyang high-speed railway, this backbone network was fully completed in January 2021.

Completed lines Partially completed lines.

==== Four North-South HSR corridors and constituent lines ====
Beijing–Harbin high-speed railway - 350 km/h - 1,700 km
Line [corridor map]	Route Description	Designed Speed (km/h)	Length (km)	Construction Start Date	Open Date
Beijing–Harbin (Jingha HSR)	HSR Corridor of Northeast China	350	1700	2007-08-23	2021-01-22
Beijing–Shenyang (Jingshen high-speed railway)	HSR from Beijing to Shenyang via Chengde, Fuxin and Liaoning Chaoyang	350	684	2014-02-28	2018-12-29 (Chengde South–Shenyang section); 2021-01-22 (Beijing Chaoyang–Chengde South section)
Harbin–Dalian (Hada HSR)	HSR from Harbin to Dalian via Shenyang & Changchun	350	904	2007-08-23	2012-12-01
Panjin–Yingkou (Panying HSR)	Connects Yingkou on Harbin–Dalian HSR with Panjin on Qinhuangdao-Shenyang HSR	350	89	2009-05-31	2013-09-12

Beijing–Shanghai high-speed railway - 380 km/h - 1,433 km
Line [corridor map]	Route Description	Designed Speed (km/h)	Length (km)	Construction Start Date	Open Date
Beijing–Shanghai (Jinghu HSR)	HSR Corridor of East China	380	1433	2008-01-08	2012-10-16
Beijing–Shanghai (Jinghu HSR)	HSR from Beijing to Shanghai via Tianjin, Jinan, Xuzhou, Bengbu and Nanjing	380	1302	2008-04-18	2011-06-30
Hefei–Bengbu (Hebeng HSR)	Spur off Jinghu HSR from Bengbu to Hefei	380	131	2008-01-08	2012-10-16

Beijing–Guangzhou–Shenzhen–Hong Kong High-Speed Railway - 350 km/h - 2,229 km
Line [corridor map]	Route Description	Designed Speed (km/h)	Length (km)	Construction Start Date	Open Date
Beijing–Guangzhou–Shenzhen–Hong Kong (Jingguangshengang HSR)	HSR Corridor connecting North with South Central China	350	2229	2005-09-01	2018-09-23
Beijing–Shijiazhuang (Jingshi HSR)	HSR from Beijing to Shijiazhuang	350	281	2008-10-08	2012-12-26
Shijiazhuang–Wuhan (Shiwu HSR)	HSR from Shijiazhuang to Zhengzhou	350	838	2008-10-15	2012-12-26
Shijiazhuang–Wuhan (Shiwu HSR)	HSR from Zhengzhou to Wuhan	350	838	2008-10-15	2012-09-28
Wuhan–Guangzhou (Wuguang HSR)	HSR from Wuhan to Guangzhou via Changsha	350	968	2005-09-01	2009-12-26; 2010-01-30
Guangzhou–Shenzhen (Guangshengang XRL)	Mainland section of the Express Rail Link. HSR from Guangzhou to Shenzhen North Railway Station.	350	116	2008-08-20	2011-12-26
Guangzhou–Shenzhen (Guangshengang XRL)	Mainland section of the Express Rail Link. HSR from Shenzhen North to the border of Hong Kong.	350	116	2008-08-20	2015-12-30
Shenzhen–Hong Kong (Guangshengang XRL)	Hong Kong section of the Express Rail Link. HSR from the border of Shenzhen to Hong Kong.	200	26	2010	2018-09-23

Hangzhou–Fuzhou–Shenzhen High-Speed Railway - 350–250 km/h - 1,495 km
Line [corridor map]	Route Description	Designed Speed (km/h)	Length (km)	Construction Start Date	Open Date
Hangzhou–Fuzhou–Shenzhen (Hangfushen PDL)	PDL from Hangzhou to Shenzhen, with plans for a rail bridge across the Hangzhou Bay by 2020.	250- 350	1450	2005-08-01	2013-12-28
Hangzhou–Ningbo (Hangyong PDL)	HSR from Hangzhou to Ningbo	350	152	2009-04	2013-07-01
Ningbo–Taizhou–Wenzhou (Yongtaiwen PFL)	Mixed passenger & freight HSR line along the coast of Zhejiang Province from Ningbo to Wenzhou via Taizhou.	250	268	2005-10-27	2009-09-28
Wenzhou–Fuzhou (Wenfu PFL)	Mixed passenger & freight HSR line from Wenzhou to Fuzhou.	250	298	2005-01-08	2009-09-28
Fuzhou–Xiamen (Fuxia PFL)	Mixed passenger & freight HSR line along the coast of Fujian Province from Fuzhou to Xiamen via Putian & Quanzhou.	250	275	2005-10-01	2010-04-26
Xiamen–Shenzhen (Xiashen PFL)	Mixed passenger & freight HSR line along the coast of Fujian and Guangdong from Xiamen to Shenzhen via Zhangzhou, Shantou & Huizhou.	250	502	2007-11-23	2013-12-28

==== Four East-West HSR corridors and constituent lines ====
Qingdao–Taiyuan High-Speed Railway - 250 km/h - 873 km
Line [corridor map]	Route Description	Designed Speed (km/h)	Length (km)	Construction Start Date	Open Date
Qingdao–Taiyuan (Qingtai PDL)	PDL of North China consisting of three segments connecting Taiyuan, Shijiazhuang, Jinan and Qingdao.	250- 350	817	2005-06-01	2018-12-26
Qingdao–Jinan Passenger Railway (Jiaoji PDL)	PDL connecting Qingdao and Jinan	250	364	2007-01-28	2008-12-20
Jinan–Shijiazhuang (Shijiazhuang–Jinan High-Speed Railway)	PDL connecting Shijiazhuang & Jinan via Dezhou	250	319	2014-03-16	2017-12-28
Shijiazhuang–Taiyuan (Shijiazhuang–Taiyuan High-Speed Railway)	PDL connecting Shijiazhuang & Taiyuan.	250	190	2005-06-11	2009-04-01

Xuzhou–Lanzhou High-Speed Railway - 350 km/h - 1,363 km
Line [corridor map]	Route Description	Designed Speed (km/h)	Length (km)	Construction Start Date	Open Date
Xuzhou–Lanzhou (Xulan High-Speed Railway)	HSR Corridor across the Yellow River Valley of central China, consisting of four segments connecting Xuzhou, Zhengzhou, Xi'an, Baoji and Lanzhou.	350	1363	2005-06-01	2017-07-09
Xuzhou–Zhengzhou (Zhengzhou–Xuzhou High-Speed Railway)	HSR connecting Xuzhou & Zhengzhou	350	357	2012-12-26	2016-09-10
Zhengzhou–Xi'an (Zhengzhou–Xi'an High-Speed Railway)	HSR connecting Zhengzhou & Xi'an	350	455	2005-09-01	2010-02-06
Xi'an–Baoji (Xi'an–Baoji High-Speed Railway)	HSR connecting Xi'an & Baoji	350	148	2009-11-22	2013-12-28
Baoji–Lanzhou (Baoji–Lanzhou High-Speed Railway)	HSR connecting Baoji & Lanzhou	350	403	2012-10	2017-07-09

Shanghai–Wuhan–Chengdu High-Speed Railway - 350–200 km/h - 2,078 km
Line [corridor map]	Route Description	Designed Speed (km/h)	Length (km)	Construction Start Date	Open Date
Shanghai–Wuhan–Chengdu (Huhanrong PDL)	PDL through the Yangtze Valley, consisting of the Shanghai-Nanjing section of the Beijing–Shanghai HSR, and 7 mixed-use HSR segments connecting Nanjing, Hefei, Wuhan, Yichang, Lichuan, Chongqing, Suining & Chengdu.	350- 200	2078	2003-12-01	2014-7-1
Shanghai–Nanjing	shares track with Shanghai-Nanjing section of Beijing-Shanghai HSR	350	301	2008-07-01	2010-07-01
Nanjing–Hefei (Hening PFL)	Mixed passenger & freight HSR connecting Nanjing & Hefei	350	166	2005-06-11	2008-04-19
Hefei–Wuhan (Hewu PFL)	Mixed passenger & freight HSR connecting Hefei & Wuhan	350	351	2005-08-01	2009-04-01
Hankou (Wuhan)–Yichang (Hanyi R.R.)	Mixed passenger & freight HSR connecting Wuhan & Yichang	250	293	2008-09-17	2012-07-01
Yichang–Wanzhou (Yichang–Lichuan section of Yiwan R.R.)	Mixed passenger & freight HSR connecting Yichang & Lichuan	200	377	2003-12-01	2014-7-1
Lichuan–Chongqing (Yuli R.R.)	Mixed passenger & freight HSR connecting Lichuan & Chongqing	200	264	2008-12-29	2013-12-28
Chongqing–Suining (Suiyu R.R.)	Mixed passenger & freight HSR connecting Chongqing & Suining	200	132	2009-01-18	2012-12-31
Dazhou–Chengdu (Suining–Chengdu section of Dacheng R.R.)	Mixed passenger & freight HSR connecting Suining & Chengdu.	200	148	2005-05	2009-06-30

Shanghai–Kunming high-speed railway - 350 km/h - 2,066 km
Line [corridor map]	Route Description	Designed Speed (km/h)	Length (km)	Construction Start Date	Open Date
Shanghai–Kunming (Hukun HSR)	HSR Corridor connecting East, Central and Southwest China. It consists of three sections connecting Shanghai, Hangzhou, Changsha and Kunming.	350	2066	2008-12-28	2016-12-28
Shanghai–Hangzhou (Shanghai–Hangzhou high-speed railway)	HSR connecting Shanghai Hongqiao & Hangzhou East.	350	150	2009-02-26	2010-10-26
Hangzhou–Changsha (Hangzhou–Changsha high-speed railway)	HSR from Hangzhou to Nanchang	350	582	2010-07-01	2014-12-10
Hangzhou–Changsha (Hangzhou–Changsha high-speed railway)	HSR from Nanchang to Changsha	350	344	2009-02-26	2014-09-16
Changsha–Kunming (Changsha–Kunming high-speed railway)	HSR from Changsha to Guiyang	350	702	2010-03-26	2015-6-18
Changsha–Kunming (Changsha–Kunming high-speed railway)	HSR from Guiyang to Kunming	350	473	2010-03-26	2016-12-28

=== "Eight Vertical and Eight Horizontal" network ===
Map of "Eight Vertical and Eight Horizontal" high-speed railway network (in Chinese)

In 2016, the National Development and Reform Commission (NDRC) announced the plans to extend the almost completed "Four Vertical and Four Horizontal" network to a new "Eight Vertical and Eight Horizontal" network. The new network comprises eight north-south ("vertical") corridors and eight east-west ("horizontal") ones, almost doubling the route length.

A corridor may consist of two or more parallel lines that take different routes between the same cities, branch and connector lines, and in some cases, connecting lines and lower-speed lines. The Beijing-Shanghai HSR corridor, one of the verticals, comprises the preexisting Beijing-Shanghai HSR, which runs through Tianjin, Jinan, Bengbu, Nanjing, Wuxi and Suzhou, as well as a new high-speed passenger dedicated line from Beijing to Shanghai via Tianjin, Dongying, Weifang, Linyi, Huaian, Yangzhou, and Nantong, as well as HSRs connecting Nanjing, Hefei and Shanghai with Hangzhou. Some corridors consist of a single HSR line; the Shanghai-Kunming HSR corridor, one of the horizontals, is essentially the Shanghai–Kunming High-Speed Railway by another name.

The national HSR mainlines in the 8+8 corridor grid are generally electrified, double-tracked, passenger-dedicated HSR lines built to accommodate train speeds of 250–350 km/h, but corridors also make use of intercity and regional HSR lines with speeds of 200 km/h as well as certain regular speed railways. The Qingdao-Yinchuan corridor includes the Taiyuan–Zhongwei–Yinchuan Railway, which is partially single-track with speeds of only 160 km/h.

Completed lines

Eight vertical lines

No.	Line	Passing Cities	Changes from 4+4 Network
1	Coastal corridor (沿海通道)	Dalian (Dandong)-Qinhuangdao-Tianjin-Dongying-Weifang-Qingdao (Yantai)-Lianyungang-Yancheng-Nantong-Shanghai-Ningbo-Fuzhou-Xiamen-Shenzhen-Zhanjiang-Beihai (Fangchenggang)	Extensions of Hangzhou–Fuzhou–Shenzhen High-Speed Railway; north from Hangzhou to Dalian/Dandong, and south from Shenzhen to Fangchenggang.
2	Beijing–Shanghai corridor (京沪通道)	Beijing, Tianjin, Jinan, Nanjing, Shanghai (Hangzhou)	Incorporates all of Beijing–Shanghai High-Speed Railway and other parallel line sections connecting Beijing and Shanghai.
3	Beijing–Hong Kong (Taipei) corridor (京港（台）通道)	Beijing-Hengshui-Heze-Shangqiu-Fuyang-Hefei (Huanggang)-Jiujiang-Nanchang-Ganzhou-Shenzhen-Hong Kong (Kowloon)	New line.
4	Beijing–Harbin, Beijing–Hong Kong (Macau) corridor (京哈～京港澳通道)	Harbin-Changchun-Shenyang-Beijing-Shijiazhuang-Zhengzhou-Wuhan-Changsha-Guangzhou-Shenzhen-Hong Kong, and Guangzhou-Zhuhai-Macau.	Merger of Beijing–Harbin High-Speed Railway and Beijing–Guangzhou–Shenzhen–Hong Kong High-Speed Railway, with a branch line to Macau.
5	Hohhot–Nanning corridor (呼南通道)	Hohhot-Taiyuan- Zhengzhou-Xiangyang-Changde-Yiyang-Shaoyang-Yongzhou-Guilin-Nanning.	New line
6	Beijing–Kunming corridor (京昆通道)	Beijing-Shijiazhuang-Taiyuan-Xi'an-Chengdu (Chongqing)-Kunming, including Beijing-Taiyuan-Zhangjiakou-Datong.	New line
7	Baotou (Yinchuan)–Hainan corridor (包（银）海通道)	Baotou-Yan'an-Xi'an-Chongqing-Guiyang-Nanning-Zhanjiang-Haikou (Sanya).	New line
8	Lanzhou (Xining)–Guangzhou corridor (兰（西）广通道)	Lanzhou (Xining), Chengdu (Chongqing), Guiyang, Guangzhou.	New line

Eight horizontal lines

No.	Line	Passing Cities	Changes from 4+4 Network
9	Suifenhe–Manzhouli corridor (绥满通道)	Suifenhe, Mudanjiang, Harbin, Qiqihar, Hailar, Manzhouli.	New line
10	Beijing–Lanzhou corridor (京兰通道)	Beijing, Hohhot, Yinchuan, Lanzhou.	Incorporates all of Beijing–Lanzhou High-Speed Railway and other parallel line sections connecting Beijing and Lanzhou
11	Qingdao–Yinchuan corridor (青银通道)	Qingdao, Jinan, Shijiazhuang, Taiyuan, Yinchuan.	West extension of Qingdao–Taiyuan high-speed railway from Taiyuan to Yinchuan.
12	Eurasia Continental Bridge corridor (陆桥通道)	Lianyungang, Xuzhou, Zhengzhou, Xi'an, Lanzhou, Xining, Urumqi.	Extensions of Xuzhou–Lanzhou high-speed railway; east from Xuzhou to Lianyungang, and west from Lanzhou to Urumqi.
13	Yangtze River corridor (沿江通道)	Shanghai-Nanjing-Hefei-Wuhan-Chongqing-Chengdu, including Nanjing-Anqing-Jiujiang-Wuhan-Yichang-Chongqing, and Wanzhou-Dazhou-Suining-Chengdu.	Incorporates all of Shanghai–Wuhan–Chengdu high-speed railway and other parallel line sections connecting Shanghai and Chengdu.
14	Shanghai–Kunming corridor (沪昆通道)	Shanghai, Hangzhou, Nanchang, Changsha, Guiyang, Kunming.	Route is identical to the Shanghai–Kunming high-speed railway.
15	Xiamen–Chongqing corridor (厦渝通道)	Xiamen, Longyan, Ganzhou, Changsha, Changde, Zhangjiajie, Qianjiang, Chongqing.	New line
16	Guangzhou–Kunming corridor (广昆通道)	Guangzhou, Nanning, Kunming.	Mixed passenger & freight HSR connecting Guangzhou & Kunming

== Other Regional high-speed rail lines ==
Regional high-speed rail lines connect major cities and national HSR lines and are built to accommodate train speeds of up to 200–350 km/h (120–220 mph). According to the "Mid-to-Long Term Railway Network Plan" (revised in 2008), the MOR plans to build over 40,000 km (25,000 mi) of railway in order to expand the railway network in western China and to fill gaps in the networks of eastern and central China. The 2008 Revisions to Railway Network Plan listed regional railways in Jiangxi, Sichuan and the Northeast. The 2016 Revision lays out 10 new regional railways in eastern China, four in the Northeast, seven in central China, and five in western China. These are also considered high-speed rail though they are not part of the national HSR grid or Intercity High Speed Rail. However several HSR lines planned and built as a regional high-speed railway under the 2008 Revisions have since been incorporated into the 8+8 national grid.

Completed lines Partially completed lines. Click [show] for details.

Guangxi Coastal high-speed railway - 250 km/h - 261 km
Line [corridor map]	Route Description	Designed Speed (km/h)	Length (km)	Construction Start Date	Open Date
Guangxi Coastal (Guangxi Coastal Railway Expansion and Reconstruction Project)	HSR from Nanning to the Guangxi coast via Qinzhou.	250	261	2008-12-11	2013-12-28
Nanning–Qinzhou (Nanning–Qinzhou high-speed railway)	HSR from Nanning to Qinzhou.	250	99	2008-12-11	2013-12-28
Qinzhou–Fangchenggang (Qinzhou–Fangchenggang high-speed railway)	HSR from Qinzhou to Fangchenggang.	250	63	2009-06-23	2013-12-28
Qinzhou–Beihai (Qinzhou–Beihai high-speed railway)	HSR from Qinzhou to Beihai.	250	100	2009-06-23	2013-12-28

Datong–Xi'an high-speed railway - 200–250 km/h - 859 km
Line [corridor map]	Route Description	Designed Speed (km/h)	Length (km)	Construction Start Date	Open Date
Datong–Xi'an (Datong–Xi'an Passenger Railway)	HSR from Datong to Xi'an via Taiyuan.	200–250	859	2009-12-03	2019-12-30
Datong–Taiyuan	HSR from Datong to Taiyuan. (Line operational from Yuanping County to Taiyuan; final section from Yuanping to Datong expect to be completed by 2020.)	200-250	274	2009-12-03	2019-12-30
Taiyuan–Xi'an	HSR from Taiyuan to Xi'an	250	585	2009-12-03	2014-07-01

Other lines under construction around the country
Line Name	Route Description	Designed Speed (km/h)	Length (km)	Construction Start Date	Open Date
Chongqing–Guiyang	HSR from Chongqing to Guiyang.	200	345	2010-12-22	2018-01-25
Kunming-Dali Railway	HSR Kunming-Yangoon (sections after Dali are unbuilt)	250	341	2008	2018-07-01
Jilin–Hunchun	HSR linking Jilin and Hunchun	250	359	2010	2015-09-20
Shangqiu–Hangzhou	HSR linking Shangqiu, Hefei and Hangzhou	350	770	2014	2019-12-01 (Shangqiu–Hefei section); 2020-06-28 (Hefei–Hangzhou section)
Zhengzhou–Wanzhou	HSR linking Zhengzhou, Xiangyang, Badong and Wanzhou	350	770	2015	2022-06-20
Meizhou–Chaozhou–Shantou	HSR linking Meizhou, Chaozhou and Shantou	250	120	2015-04	2019-10-11
Lianyungang–Zhenjiang	HSR linking Lianyungang, Huai'an, Yangzhou and Zhenjiang	250	305	2014-12-26	2019-12-16 (Lianyungang–Huai’an section); 2020-12-11 (Huai’an–Dantu section)
Shanghai–Huzhou	HSR linking Shanghai, Suzhou and Huzhou	350	164	2018-02-01	2024-12-26
Hangzhou-Yiwu-Wenzhou Phase 1	Phase I of a HSR linking Hangzhou, Yiwu and Wenzhou	350	218	2018	2024-09-06
Hangzhou-Yiwu-Wenzhou Phase 2	Phase II of a HSR linking Hangzhou, Yiwu and Wenzhou	350	143	2019	2024-09-06
Nanchang-Jingdezhen-Huangshan	HSR linking Nanchang, Jingdezhen and Huangshan	350	290	2018-12-25	2023-12-27
Jiamusi-Shenyang	HSR linking Jiamusi, Mudanjiang, Dunhua, Changbaishan, Baishan, Tonghua, and Shenyang (Line operational from Dunhua to Baishan; section from Jiamusi to Mudanjiang expect to be completed by February 2022.)	250	1100	2016	2030
Huzhou–Hangzhou high-speed railway	HSR linking Huzhou and Hangzhou	350	136	2019	2022-09-22

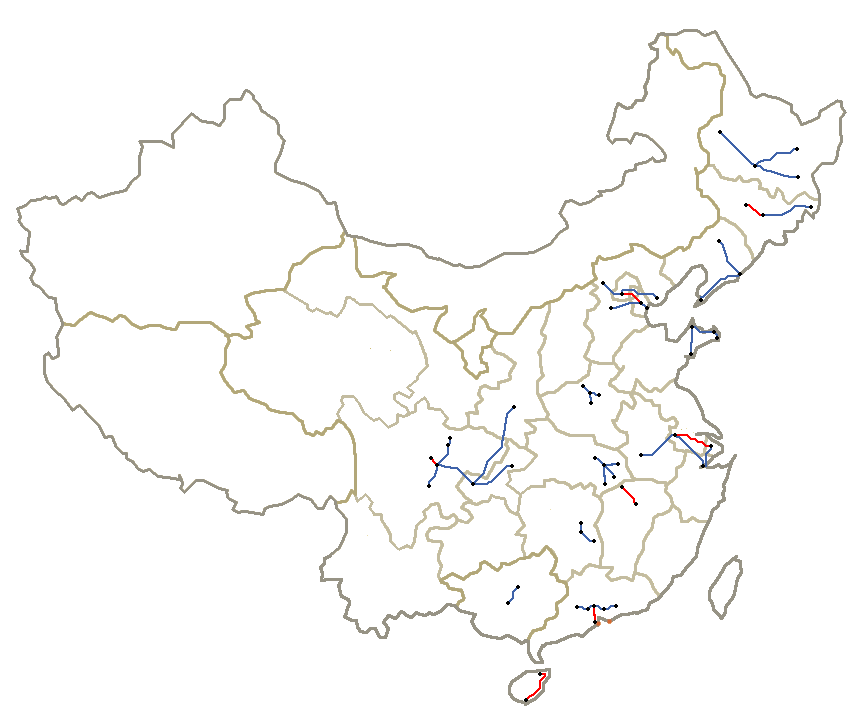
Map showing some of China's intercity railways, including lines already operational (red) and lines under construction.

== High-speed intercity railways ==
Intercity lines with speeds ranging from 200–350 km/h (120–220 mph) are designed to provide regional high-speed rail service between large cities and metropolitan areas that are generally within the same province. They are built with the approval of the central government but are financed and operated largely by local governments with limited investment and oversight from the China Rail Corporation. Some intercity lines run parallel to national grid high-speed rail lines but serve more stations along the route.

The 2004 Railway Network Plan arranged for intercity lines around the Bohai Rim, Yangtze and Pearl River Deltas. The 2008 Revision to the Railway Network Plan designated Changsha, Wuhan, Zhengzhou, Chengdu, Chongqing, Xi'an and coastal Fujian metropolitan areas for intercity rail development. The 2016 Revision to the Railway Network Plan identifies the Shandong Peninsula, coastal Guangxi, Harbin-Changchun, southern Liaoning, central Yunnan, central Guizhou, the northern slopes of Tian Shan, Yinchuan, Hohhot-Baotou-Ordos-Yulin as additional metro regions for intercity rail.

Completed lines Partially completed lines. Click [show] for details.

Line	Design Speed (km/h)	Length (km)	Construction Start Date	Open Date
Beijing–Tianjin Intercity Railway	350	115	2005-04-07	2008-08-01
Chengdu–Dujiangyan Intercity Railway	220	65 (mainline)	2008-11-04	2010-05-12
Chengdu–Dujiangyan Intercity Railway	200	21 (Pengzhou branch)	2009-09-27	2014-04-30
Shanghai–Nanjing Intercity Railway	350	301	2008-07-01	2010-07-01
Nanchang–Jiujiang Intercity Railway	250	131	2007-06-28	2010-09-20
Hainan eastern ring high-speed railway	250	308	2007-09-29	2010-12-30
Changchun–Jilin Intercity Railway	250	111	2007-05-13	2010-12-30
Pearl River Delta Metropolitan Region intercity railway	200	117; Guangzhou–Zhuhai	2005-12-18	2011-01-07; 2012-12-31
Pearl River Delta Metropolitan Region intercity railway	200	27; Xinhui branch	2005-12-18	2011-01-07
Pearl River Delta Metropolitan Region intercity railway	200	85; Guangzhou–Zhaoqing	2009-09-29	2016-03-30
Pearl River Delta Metropolitan Region intercity railway	200	97; Dongguan–Huizhou	2009-05-08	2016-03-30
Pearl River Delta Metropolitan Region intercity railway	200	38; Guangzhou–Qingyuan	2012-11-22	2020-10-30
Nanjing–Hangzhou Intercity Railway	350	251	2008-12-28	2013-07-01
Hengyang–Liuzhou Intercity Railway	250	497	2009	2013-12-28
Liuzhou–Nanning Intercity Railway	250	223	2008-12-27	2013-12-28
Wuhan Metropolitan Area Intercity Railway	250	90; Wuchang–Xianning	2009-03-22	2013-12-28
Wuhan Metropolitan Area Intercity Railway	250	97; Wuhan–Huangshi	2009-03-22	2014-06-18
Wuhan Metropolitan Area Intercity Railway	250	66; Wuhan–Huanggang	2009-03-22	2014-06-18
Wuhan Metropolitan Area Intercity Railway	250	198 Wuhan–Jiujiang	2016	2017-09-21
Wuhan Metropolitan Area Intercity Railway	200	61; Hankou–Xiaogan	2009-03-22	2016-12-01
Wuhan Metropolitan Area Intercity Railway	200	438; Wuhan-Shiyan	2015	2019-11-29
Jiangyou–Mianyang–Chengdu–Leshan Intercity Railway	200	314	2008-12-30	2014-12-20
Chengdu–Pujiang Intercity Railway	200	99	2010-10-16	2018-12-28
Central Plain Metropolitan Intercity Rail	200	50; Zhengzhou–Kaifeng	2009-12-29	2014-12-28
Central Plain Metropolitan Intercity Rail	200	69; Zhengzhou–Jiaozuo	2009-12-29	2015-06-26
Central Plain Metropolitan Intercity Rail	200	101; Zhengzhou–Xuchang	2009-12-29	2015-12-31
Changsha–Zhuzhou–Xiangtan Intercity Railway	200	96	2010-07-02	2016-12-26
Nanjing–Anqing Intercity Railway	250	257	2008-12-28	2015-07
Harbin–Qiqihar Intercity Railway	250	286	2008-11-25	2015
Qingdao–Rongcheng Intercity Railway	250	299	2010-10-10	2014-12-28
Guiyang–Kaiyang Intercity Railway	200	62	2010-09-20	2015-05-01
Jinhua-Wenzhou High Speed Railway	250	188	2011	2015-12-26
Chengdu–Chongqing Intercity Railway	350	305	2009	2015
Shenyang–Dandong Intercity Railway	350	208	2010-03-17	2015
Dandong–Dalian Intercity Railway	200	296	2010-03-17	2015
Chongqing–Wanzhou Intercity Railway	350	250	2009	2016-11-28
Hainan western ring high-speed railway	250	342	2012-10	2015-12-30
Wuhan–Jiujiang Passenger Railway	250	101	2013-12-29	2017-09-21
Tianjin–Baoding Intercity Railway	250	158	2011-03-18	2015-12-28
Beijing–Tangshan Intercity Railway	350	160	2009	2022-12-30
Hangzhou–Huangshan Intercity Railway	250	265	2014-06-30	2018-12-25
Harbin–Jiamusi Intercity Railway	200	343	2014-06-30	2018-09-30
Harbin–Mudanjiang Intercity Railway	250	293	2014-12-15	2018-12-25
Anshun–Liupanshui intercity railway	250	150	2015	2020-07-08
Jiangsu Yangtze Metropolitan Belt intercity railway	350	278	2018-10-08	2023-09-28
Mianyang–Luzhou high-speed railway	250; Neijiang–Zigong–Luzhou	130	2015-12-25	2021-06-28
Chengdu–Yibin high-speed railway	350; Zigong–Yibin	131	2015-12-25	2023-12-26

== Class I national railways ==
Completed lines Partially completed lines. Click [show] for details.

Line	Design speed (km/h)	Length (km)	Construction start date	Open date	Ref
Longyan–Xiamen railway	200	171	2006-12-25	2012-06-29	
Xiangtang–Putian railway	200	635	2007-11-23	2013-09-26	
Hengyang–Liuzhou intercity railway	200	498	2008-12-11	2013-12-28	
Nanning–Guangzhou high-speed railway	250	577	2008-09-11	2014-04-18; 2014-12-26	
Ganzhou–Longyan railway	200	274	2009-12-29	2015-12-25	
Chongqing–Lanzhou railway	200	832	2008-09-26	2017-09-29	
Nanping–Longyan railway	250	247	2010-12-25	2018-12-29	
Chengdu–Lanzhou railway	200	730	2011-02-26	2026	
Jiujiang–Quzhou railway	200	333	2013-12-29	2017-12-28	
Nantong–Shanghai railway	200	137	2014-03-01	2020-07-01	
Fuzhou–Pingtan railway	200	88.4	2013-10-31	2020-12-26	
Qianjiang–Changde railway	200	340	2014-12-29	2019-12-26	
Qingdao–Yancheng railway	200	429	2014-12-29	2018-12-26	

== See also ==
- List of railway lines in China
