= Mudanjiang–Suifenhe railway =

Mudanjiang–Suifenhe Railway simplified Chinese: 牡绥铁路; traditional Chinese: 白綏鐵路; pinyin: Mǔ suí tiělù

Overview
- Status: Open
- Owner: China Railway
- Locale: Heilongjiang, China
- Termini: Mudanjiang; Suifenhe
- Stations: 7

Service
- Operator: CR Harbin Group

Technical
- Line length: 138.8 km (86.2 mi)
- Num of tracks: 2
- Track gauge: 1,435 mm (4 ft 8 1/2 in)
- Electrification: 25 kV 50 Hz AC (overhead line)
- Operating speed: 200 kilometres per hour (120 mph) (design speed)

The Mudanjiang–Suifenhe Railway or Musu railway (simplified Chinese: 牡绥铁路; traditional Chinese: 白綏鐵路; pinyin: Mǔ suí tiělù), officially named the Mudanjiang–Suifenhe section of the Harbin–Suifenhe railway, is located in Mudanjiang, Heilongjiang Province. It forms part of the Suifenhe–Manzhouli corridor of the eight north–south routes in China's "Eight Vertical and Eight Horizontal" network It is 138.8 km (86.2 mi)-long, with a designed speed of 200 km/h (120 mph) and a total investment of ¥ 10.62 billion. It was approved under the name of "Expansion and Renovation Project of Mudanjiang–Suifenhe section of Suifenhe–Harbin railway". On 28 December 2015, the expansion and renovation project was opened to traffic. After the opening of the Harbin–Mudanjiang intercity railway, the Mudanjiang–Suifenhe section and the Harbin–Mudanjiang ICR were connected and operated. The train travel time between Suifenhe, Mudanjiang and Harbin was shortened from 4–9 hours to 1–2 hours, which greatly promoted the economic and trade exchanges between Suifenhe and the Primorsky Krai of Russia.

== Overview ==
The Mudanjiang–Suifenhe section of the Suifenhe–Harbin railway was completed in 1901 as part of the original route of the Trans-Siberian Railway. Due to its long construction period and poor technical condition, the passenger train speed was only 46.5 km/h (28.9 mph), which seriously affected the efficiency of the line.

The reconstruction project starts from the existing Mudanjiang station of the Suifenhe–Harbin railway, passes through Muling, Xiachengzi, and Suiyang to the border port city of Suifenhe, with a total length of 138.8 km (86.2 mi) and a design speed of 200 km/h (120 mph). The project cost ¥ 10.62 billion. The entire line is a double-track electrified railway with seven stations: Mudanjiang, Aihe, Modaoshi, Muling, Xilinhe, Suiyang and Suifenhe. The planned transport capacity is 40 pairs of passenger trains per day, 50 million tons of freight per year, and 2.13 million passenger trips per year. The entire line has 43 bridges with a total length of 29.343 kilometers and 17 tunnels with a total length of 51.044 kilometers. 57.9% of the line consists of bridges and tunnels.

== Process ==
At the end of 2008, the former Ministry of Railways decided to carry out capacity expansion and renovation of the Mudanjiang–Suifenhe section of the Suifenhe–Harbin railway, and build a second line on the general route of the original line. In October 2009, the National Development and Reform Commission approved the feasibility study report for the expansion and renovation project of the line. Work commenced on 8 July 2010. On 26 November 2015, the Shuangfeng Tunnel, the longest tunnel on the entire line at 7,237 m (23,743 ft), was successfully completed. On 22 December, the track laying project of the Mudanjiang-Suifenhe section was completed. On 28 December, the line was officially completed and opened to traffic. On 18 November 2018, this line entered the trial operation stage of EMU trains along with the Harbin-Mudanjiang High-speed Railway.

On 25 December 2018, the Harbin–Mudanjiang ICR was opened for operation, and this line added EMU trains that passed through Mudanjiang and terminated in Harbin and other places. On 30 November 2019, electronic tickets were adopted at stations along the Mudanjiang-Suifenhe line.
