= Suifenhe–Manzhouli corridor =

Railway line in China

Suifenhe–Manzhouli corridor 绥满通道

Overview
- Status: Partly operational
- Locale: People's Republic of China
- Termini: Suifenhe; Manzhouli

Service
- Type: High-speed rail
- Operator: China Railway High-speed

Technical
- Track gauge: 1,435 mm (4 ft 8 1/2 in) standard gauge
- Electrification: 50 Hz 25,000 V
- Operating speed: 200 to 350 km/h (124 to 217 mph)

The Suifenhe–Manzhouli corridor is a high-speed rail corridor located in the northeast of China running from Suifenhe in Heilongjiang to Manzhouli in Inner Mongolia. Announced as part of China's "Eight Vertical and Eight Horizontal" network, the passage passes through Harbin and Qiqihar.

== Sections ==
Name		Route	Design speed (km/h)	Length (km)	Status	Construction start	Opened	Remarks
Harbin–Suifenhe railway	Mudanjiang–Suifenhe railway	Suifenhe–Mudanjiang	200	138.8	open	8 July 2010	28 December 2015	
Harbin–Suifenhe railway	Harbin–Mudanjiang intercity railway	Mudanjiang–Harbin	250	293.2	open	15 December 2014	25 December 2018	
Harbin–Qiqihar intercity railway		Harbin–Qiqihar	250	282	open	5 July 2009	17 August 2015	
Qiqihar–Manzhouli high-speed railway		Qiqihar–Manzhouli	350	373	being planned			

== See also ==
- High-speed rail in China
