= Donglingjing railway station =

Railway station in Taiyuan, Shanxi, China

Donglingjing 东凌井
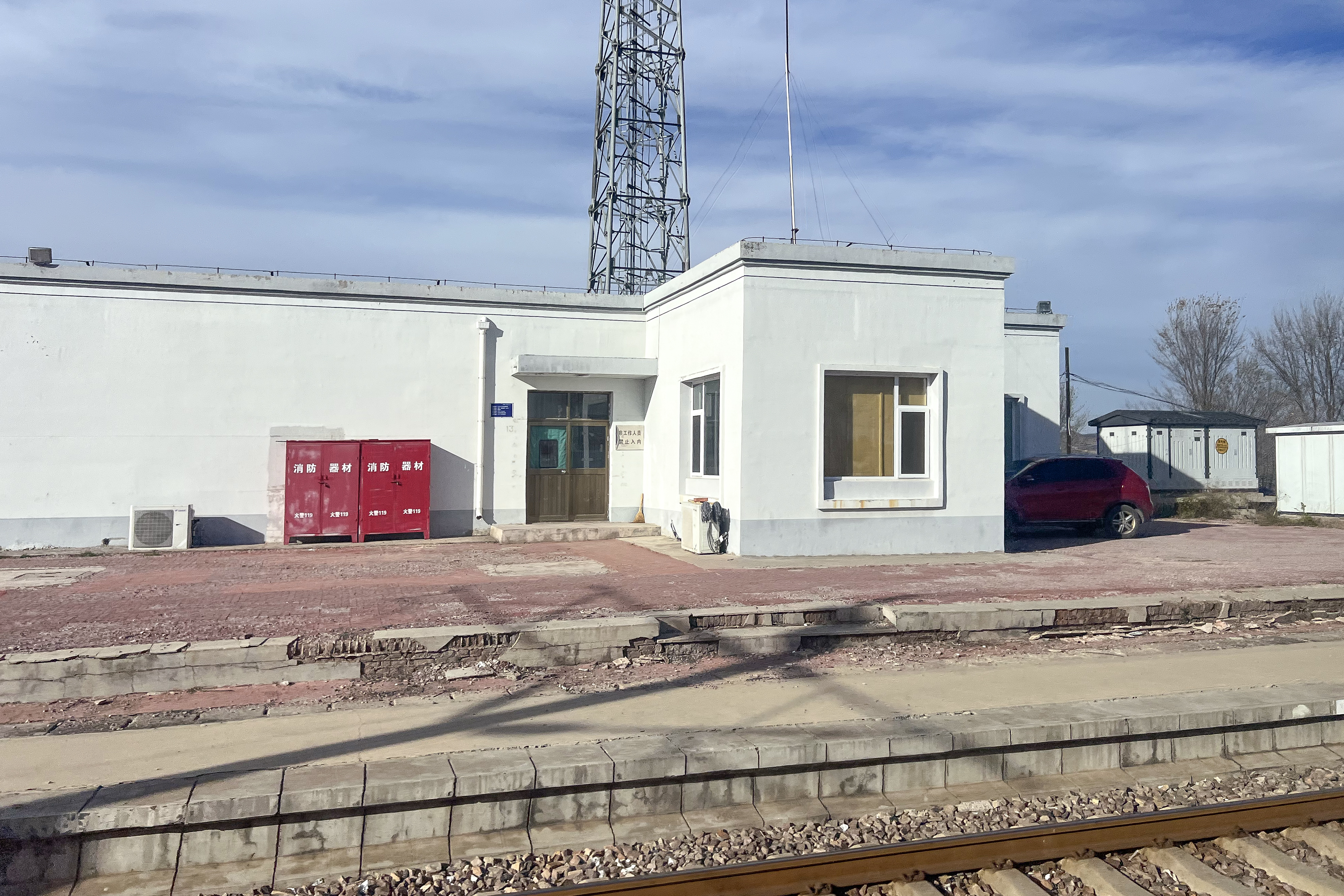
- Station building

General information
- Location: Lingjingdian Township, Yangqu County, Taiyuan, Shanxi; China
- Line: Shijiazhuang–Taiyuan high-speed railway
Location

Donglingjing railway station is a railway station on the Shijiazhuang–Taiyuan high-speed railway in Yangqu County, Taiyuan, Shanxi, China.
