= Jingxing North railway station =

Railway station in Hebei, China

Jingxing North 井陉北
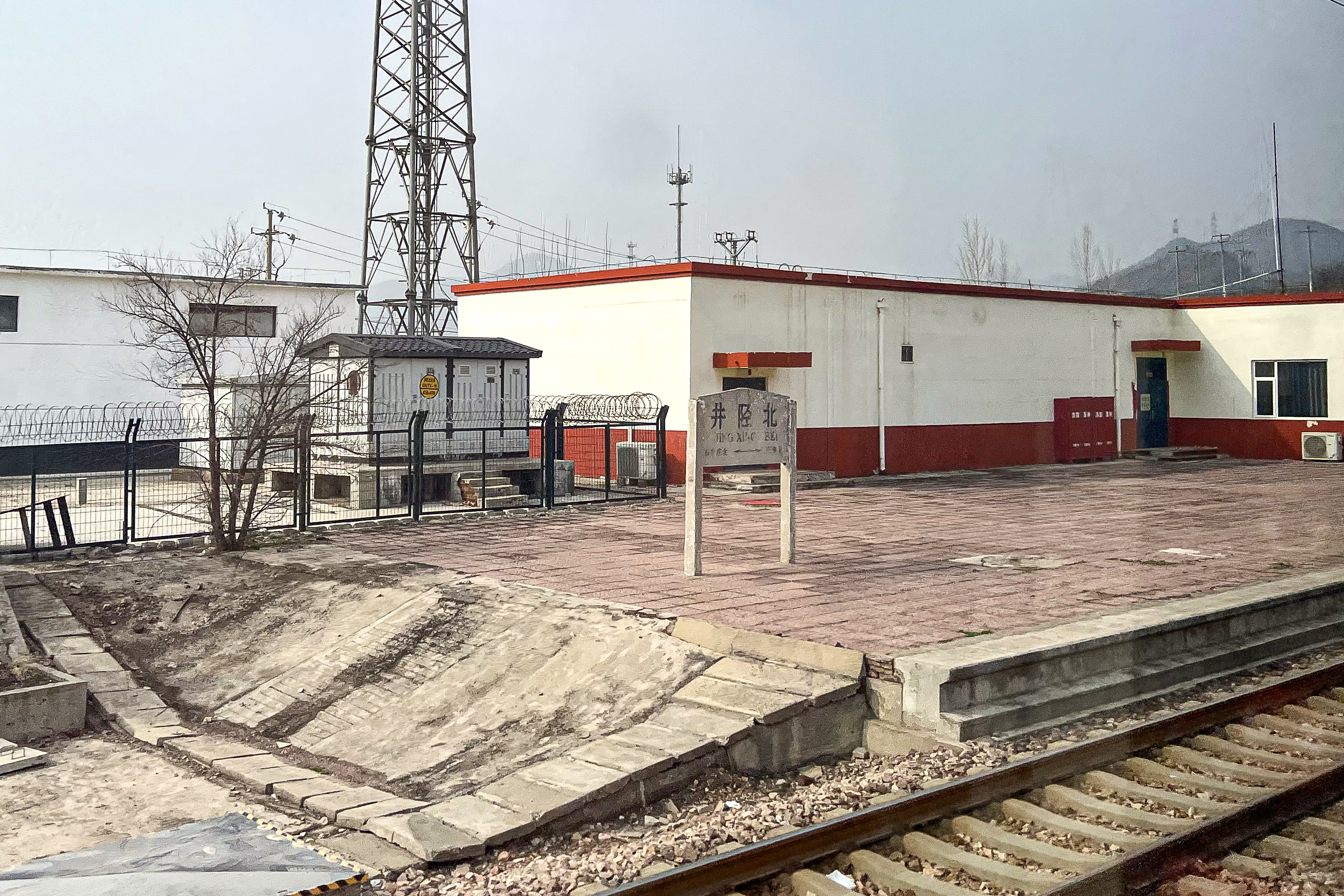

General information
- Other names: Jingxingbei
- Location: Jingxing County, Shijiazhuang, Hebei; China
- Coordinates: 38.1515°N 114.0191°E
- Line: Shijiazhuang–Taiyuan High-Speed Railway
Location

Jingxing North railway station is a railway station on the Shitai Passenger Railway, in the People's Republic of China.
