= Suifenhe–Grodekovo shuttle train =

Railway service between China and Russia

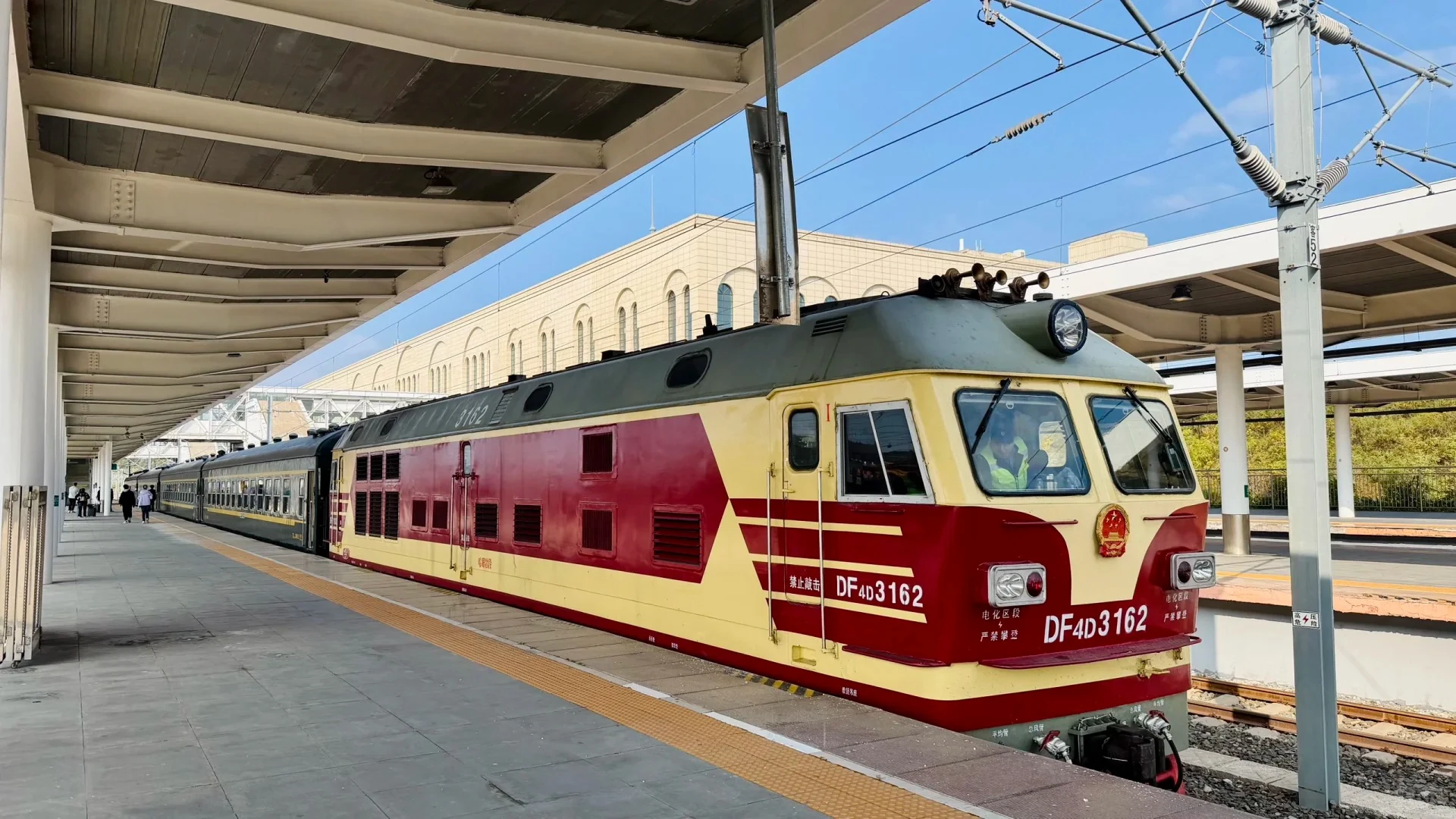
- Train 401/402 at Suifenhe railway station, shot in October 2025

Overview
- Service type: International train
- Status: Operating
- Current operator: CR Harbin

Route
- Termini: Suifenhe; Grodekovo
- Stops: 4

On-board services
- Class: Hard seat only

Technical
- Rolling stock: CR 25G coach
- Track gauge: 1,435 mm (4 ft 8 1/2 in)
- Operating speed: Less than 40 km/h

The Suifenhe–Grodekovo shuttle train, designated as Train 401/402 (Chinese: 401/402次列车; Russian: Поезд № 401/402), and nicknamed as "Guobaorou Express" (Russian: "Гобаожоу-экспресс") by Russian locals in Primorsky Krai, is an international passenger service operated by China Railway. It runs between Suifenhe, a border city in Mudanjiang, Heilongjiang Province, China, and Pogranichny in Primorsky Krai, Russian Federation. The service was inaugurated on December 1, 1991, and is currently managed by CR Harbin.

The train uses China Railway Type 25G passenger coaches and operates along the Harbin-Suifenhe Railway and the Trans-Siberian Railway, covering a total distance of 27 km (17 mi). The journey from Suifenhe station to Grodekovo railway station takes 1 hour and 38 minutes and runs under train number 402. The return trip from Grodekovo to Suifenhe takes 1 hour and 31 minutes and operates as train number 401.

From 1991 to 2015, the train had accumulated over 450,000 kilometers in operation and transported more than 5 million passengers from both China and abroad. Due to pandemic prevention and control measures, the service was temporarily suspended starting January 31, 2020. It resumed operations on December 15, 2024.

As of March 2026, tickets are sold on-site. Train 402 takes 103 Chinese yuan; while Train 401 takes in Russian Rubles equivalent to 14.9 Swiss francs (around 1,500 rubles, depending on the exchange rate) and by default, passengers are required to pay an additional 100 rubles for insurance.

== Operation mode ==
The train operates daily with a scheduled journey time of 1 hour and 30 minutes or so. However, due to the route's numerous curves and small curve radii, the train runs at a relatively low speed—typically below 40 km/h. Additionally, frequent stops to yield to freight trains often result in delays of 40 minutes to an hour. The train is hauled by a single diesel locomotive and usually consists of 6 hard-seat coaches. Extra coaches may be added depending on passenger demand, but the total number of cars must not exceed 11.

After resuming service on December 15, 2024, the train was reorganized to operate with 4 hard-seat coaches, among which only coach No. 2 and No. 3 were open for ticket sales to the public. Several months later, the locomotive was changed from the DF8 type to the DF4D type. On September 27, 2025, the newly built line on the Chinese side was officially put into operation, which “straightened” the existing mountain‑bypassing line that had been in service for more than 120 years, reducing train delays to within 30 minutes.

In addition to the train attendants, the train is staffed with both a chief and deputy for each key role, including the train captain, locomotive driver, and rolling stock inspector. Upon arrival at Grodekovo Station, only the chief and deputy train captains are permitted to disembark, and they may only conduct work-related activities within a designated area—always accompanied by one another. As there are no police officers assigned on board, border security and escort duties are handled separately by Chinese and Russian border personnel within their respective jurisdictions.

Beyond regular passenger transport, this train also serves a crucial function as a shuttle for Chinese and Russian railway personnel stationed at the international rail transit handover posts between Suifenhe and Grodekovo stations.

== Operation history ==
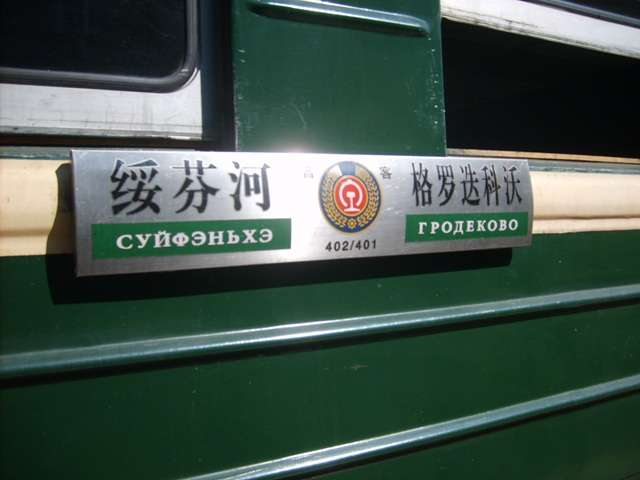
Train 401/402 board, shot in October 2007

On July 18, 1989, in response to the significant increase in inbound and outbound passengers at Suifenhe Station under the jurisdiction of Harbin Railway Bureau, China's railway authority required ticket sales for outbound passengers taking the Soviet Railway commuter trains, as well as handling luggage and parcel services. By December 31 of the same year, a total of 6,173 tickets had been sold, and 56 shipments of luggage and parcels had been processed.

On December 1, 1991, the international through passenger train service was officially launched. The train numbers operated by China Railway were Train 401 and Train 402, and those operated by Soviet Railway were Train 6509 and Train 6510. One passenger train was dispatched daily from each side at the border stations, each consisting of 2 passenger coaches and 1 luggage coach. Transport documents and all fees related to passengers, luggage and parcels were collected and handled by each party in accordance with their respective domestic regulations, without mutual settlement.

In 1992, to meet the travel needs of inbound and outbound passengers, the formation of Train 401 and Train 402 between Suifenhe and Grodekovo was expanded from the original 2 coaches to 5 coaches.

On June 1, 1993, the newly operated international passenger Train 77 between Harbin and Khabarovsk and Train 78 between Harbin and Vladivostok were attached to Trains 401 and Train 402 at Suifenhe Station for cross-border operation into Russia. The through coaches of Russian Railway were attached to Train 6509 and Train 6510 between Grodekovo and Suifenhe for cross-border operation into China.

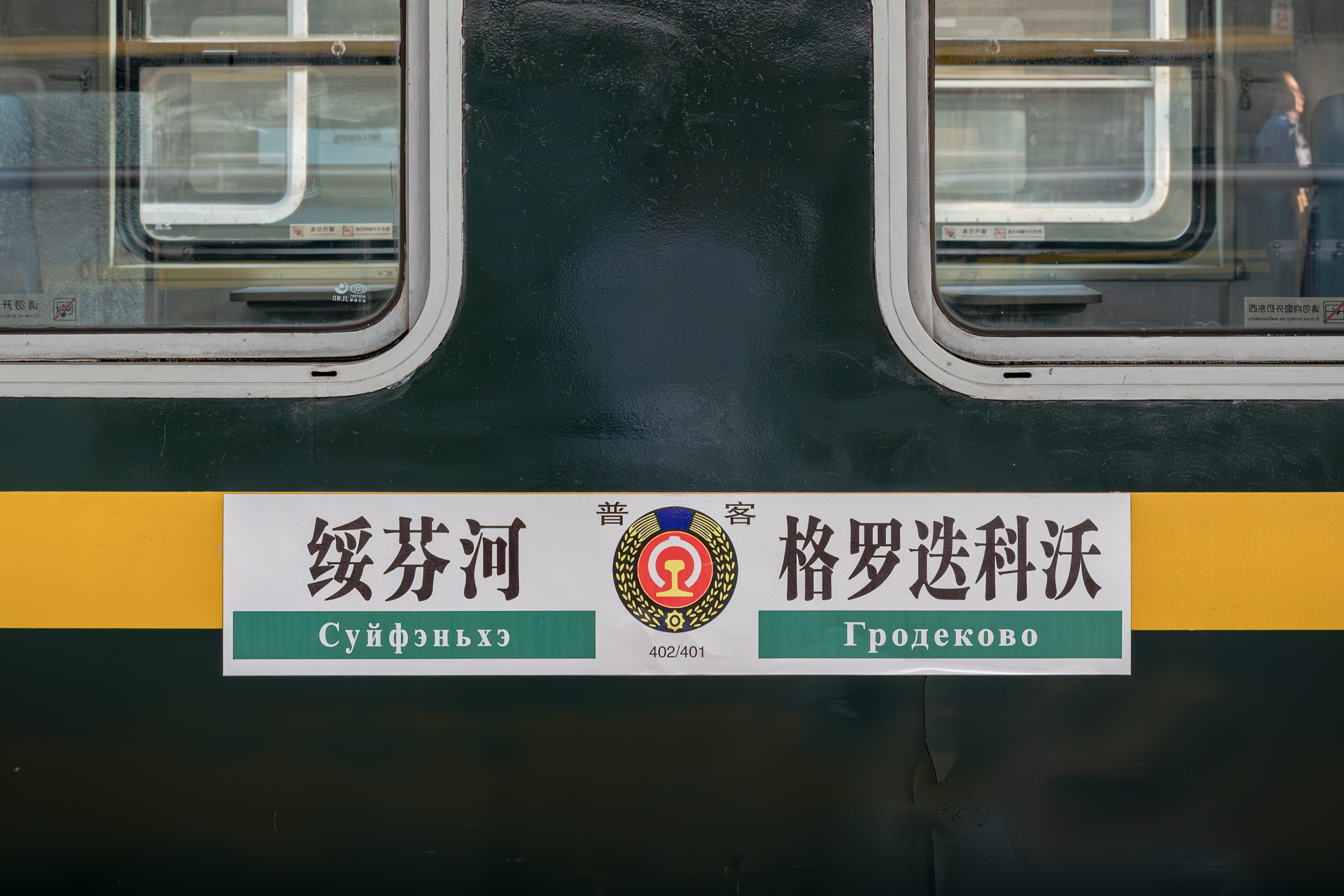
Train 401/402 board, shot in March 2025

On January 1, 2020, China Railway announced that "according to a notice from Russian Railways, the operation of passenger Train 402 and Train 401 from Suifenhe to Grodekovo [...] will be suspended from January 31, 2020 to March 1, 2020". Ever since the pandemic, Train 401 and Train 402 have not been resumed.

On May 23, 2024, the quality improvement and reconstruction project of the Harbin‑Suifenhe Railway was launched. A realignment project was carried out on the section from Suifenhe to Sino-Russo border, including the construction of 1 new tunnel, 3 bridges, 6 roadbeds and affiliated works, to replace the existing line.

On December 15, 2024, Train 402/401 from Suifenhe to Grodekovo resumed operation for the first time after the COVID-19 pandemic. China announced the news on December 8, while Russia did not make the announcement until December 10. Apart from the inconvenience of having to purchase tickets on-site, Russian media reported that Russian citizens were required to buy tickets only after Chinese tourists, which drew complaints from residents in the Primorsky Krai. In addition, Mezhdunarodny Ekspress LLC (Russian: ООО «Международный Экспресс»), a private cross-border passenger transport company in Russia’s Primorsky Krai, stated in a media interview that “the passenger rules for this train are formulated by the Chinese side. This benefits Chinese travel agencies while harming Russian ones, as we simply cannot fully capitalize on the opportunities brought by this rail service.” Meanwhile, other sources noted that the carriages operated by China Railway and their passengers on this route may currently not be insured in accordance with Russian law.

On May 28, 2025, the newly built Suifenhe Tunnel was completed through; On September 27, following the completion of the final section of the mixed gauge track, the entire line was put into operation on the same day, replacing the existing mountain‑bypassing line built by the Tsarist Russia, which had been in operation for more than 120 years.

Starting from February 9, 2026, the train's passengar coaches were changed from non-air-conditioned China Railway Type 25B (boiler heating) to air-conditioned China Railway Type 25G.

== Train formation ==
The train uses 4 Type 25G hard seat coaches from CR Harbin. Since the China–Russia border section is equipped with mixed-gauge tracks—accommodating both standard gauge and broad gauge—the train can run directly through to Grodekovo without the need to change bogies.

Section	Suifenhe↔Grodekovo
Coach no.	1-4
Type	YZ25G Hard seat
Operator	CR Harbin

== Loco shift ==
On the China–Russia border section, Train 401/402 is hauled by a Dongfeng 4D (DF4D) diesel locomotive operated by CR Harbin. The locomotive crew is provided by the CR Harbin under the same depot, covering the route between Suifenhe and Grodekovo.

Section	Suifenhe↔Grodekovo
Loco Operator Shift	DF4D CR Harbin Suifenhe

== Timetable ==
- 2 hour difference between Beijing Time (UTC+8) in China and Vladivostok Time (UTC+10) in Russia. (Note: The Russian section uses Vladivostok time that Grodekovo uses)

402				Stops	401			
Train no.	Day	Arrival	Departure	Stops	Arrival	Departure	Day	Train no.
402	Day 1	—	09:52	Suifenhe	17:14	—	Day 1	401
↑ China（CST UTC+08:00） / Russia（VLAT UTC+10:00） ↓
402	Day 1	stop & inspect		Rassypnaya Pad' (Note: Technical stop only)	stop & inspect		Day 1	401
402	Day 1	stop & inspect		Sosnovaya Pad'	stop & inspect		Day 1	401
402	Day 1	13:30	—	Grodekovo	—	17:43	Day 1	401
