= Qingdao–Yinchuan corridor =

Railway line in China

Qingdao-Yinchuan corridor 青银通道

Overview
- Status: Operational
- Locale: Shandong, Hebei, Shanxi, Shaanxi, Ningxia
- Termini: Qingdao; Yinchuan

Service
- Type: High-speed rail
- Operator(s): China Railway High-speed

Technical
- Track gauge: 1,435 mm (4 ft 8 1/2 in) standard gauge
- Electrification: 50 Hz 25,000 V
- Operating speed: 200 to 350 km/h (124 to 217 mph)

The Qingdao–Yinchuan corridor (simplified Chinese: 青银通道; traditional Chinese: 青銀通道; pinyin: Qīngyín Tōngdào) is a China Railway High-speed line running from Qingdao, Shandong to Yinchuan, Ningxia. The line passes through the cities of Jinan, Shijiazhuang, and Taiyuan. Announced in 2016 as part of China's "Eight Vertical and Eight Horizontal" network, the line comprises the existing Qingdao–Taiyuan passenger railway and the Taiyuan–Zhongwei–Yinchuan railway.

== Overview ==
The Qingdao–Yinchuan corridor runs east–west ("horizontally") from the coastal city of Qingdao in Shandong Province, passing through Jinan, Shijiazhuang, and Taiyuan before terminating at Yinchuan in Ningxia.

=== Sections ===
Operational lines are marked with green background. The Taiyuan-Yinchuan section is not high-speed and does not yet have any through trains beyond Taiyuan South and is marked as blue.

| Section | Description | Designed speed (km/h) | Length (km) | Construction start date | Open date |
|---|---|---|---|---|---|
| Qingdao–Jinan section (Qingdao–Jinan high-speed railway) | HSR connecting Qingdao and Jinan | 350 | 308 | 2015 | 2018-12-26 |
| Jinan–Shijiazhuang section (Shijiazhuang–Jinan high-speed railway) | PDL connecting Shijiazhuang & Jinan via Dezhou | 250 | 319 | 2013 | 2017-12-28 |
| Shijiazhuang–Taiyuan section (Shijiazhuang–Taiyuan high-speed railway) | PDL connecting Shijiazhuang & Taiyuan. | 250 | 190 | 2005-06-11 | 2009-04-01 |
| Taiyuan–Yinchuan section (Taiyuan–Zhongwei–Yinchuan railway) | upgraded railway connecting Taiyuan and Yinchuan through Zhongwei. | 250 | 945 | 2006-05 | 2011-01-11 |

== See also ==
- High-speed rail in China
