= Dandong railway station =

Railway station in Liaoning, China

Dandong 丹东
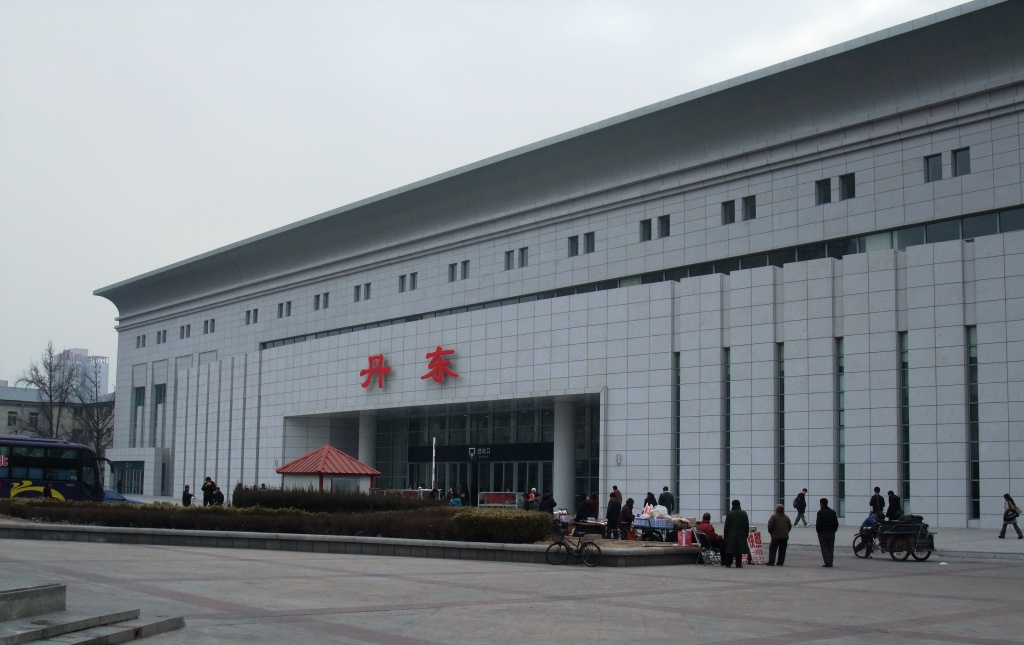

General information
- Location: Zhenxing District, Dandong, Liaoning; China
- Coordinates: 40.1230°N 124.3819°E
- Lines: Shenyang–Dandong railway Dandong–Dalian intercity railway Shenyang–Dandong intercity railway Pyongui Line
Location

Dandong railway station (Chinese: 丹东站; pinyin: Dāndōng zhàn) is located in Zhenxing District, Dandong, Liaoning, China. It is the terminus of the Shenyang–Dandong railway, the Dandong–Dalian intercity railway, and the Shenyang–Dandong intercity railway. It is also connected to the Pyongui Line, which heads south to North Korea via the Sino-Korean Friendship Bridge.

Preceding station	China Railway High-speed	Following station
Wulongbei East towards Shenyang North	Shenyang–Dandong intercity railway	Terminus
Terminus	Dandong–Dalian intercity railway	Tongxing towards Dalian
Preceding station	Korean State Railway	Following station
Terminus	P'yŏngŭi Line	Sinŭiju Ch'ŏngnyŏn towards P'yŏngyang
