= Guangzhou–Kunming high-speed railway =

Railway line in China

Guangzhou–Kunming passageway 广昆通道

Overview
- Status: Fully operational
- Locale: People's Republic of China
- Termini: Guangzhou; Kunming

Service
- Type: High-speed rail
- Operator: China Railway High-speed

History
- Opened: 28 December 2016

Technical
- Line length: 1285km
- Track gauge: 1,435 mm (4 ft 8 1/2 in) standard gauge
- Electrification: 50 Hz 25,000 V
- Operating speed: 200 to 350 km/h (124 to 217 mph)

The Guangzhou–Kunming passageway is a high-speed railway passage connecting Guangzhou in Guangdong Province and Kunming in Yunnan Province, passing through Nanning en route. Announced in 2016 as part of China's "Eight Vertical and Eight Horizontal" network, the line is made up of the existing Nanning–Guangzhou high-speed railway and Nanning–Kunming high-speed railway lines. It is about 986 km in length, and is fully operational as of 28 December 2016.

== Sections ==
Section Railway line	Description	Designed speed (km/h)	Length (km)	Construction start date	Open date
Guangzhou–Nanning; Nanning–Guangzhou high-speed railway	Class I high-speed connecting Guangzhou with Nanning.	250	576	2008-11-09	2014-12-26
Nanning–Kunming; Nanning–Kunming high-speed railway)	PDL connecting Nanning with Kunming.	250	709	2009-12-27	2016-12-28

== See also ==
- High-speed rail in China
