= Taihang Tunnel =

Railway tunnel in China

Coordinates: 38°09′11″N 113°49′12″E

Taihang Tunnel 太行山隧道
- Location within China

Overview
- Line: Shijiazhuang–Taiyuan high-speed railway
- System: China Railway
- Crosses: Taihang Mountains; Hebei and Shanxi

Operation
- Work began: 11 June 2005
- Opened: 22 December 2007

Technical
- Length: 27,848 m (17.304 mi)

Taihang Tunnel (Chinese: 太行山隧道; pinyin: Tàiháng Shān Suìdào) is the third-longest mountain railway tunnel in northern China, after the New Guanjiao and West Qinling tunnels. It is a double track tunnel that was built to allow the Shijiazhuang–Taiyuan high-speed railway to cross the Taihang Mountains. The left track is 27,839 m (17.298 mi) long and the right one is 27,848 m (17.304 mi) long. Construction on the tunnel began on 11 June 2005 and the tunnel was opened on 22 December 2007.

The Shijiazhuang–Taiyuan high-speed railway is the line linking Shijiazhuang, the capital of Hebei province, and Taiyuan, the capital of Shanxi province. After the opening of the Taihang Tunnel and completion of the high-speed railway, the travel time from Shijiazhuang to Taiyuan was reduced from almost six hours to one hour.
