= Dandong–Dalian intercity railway =

Railway line in Liaoning, China

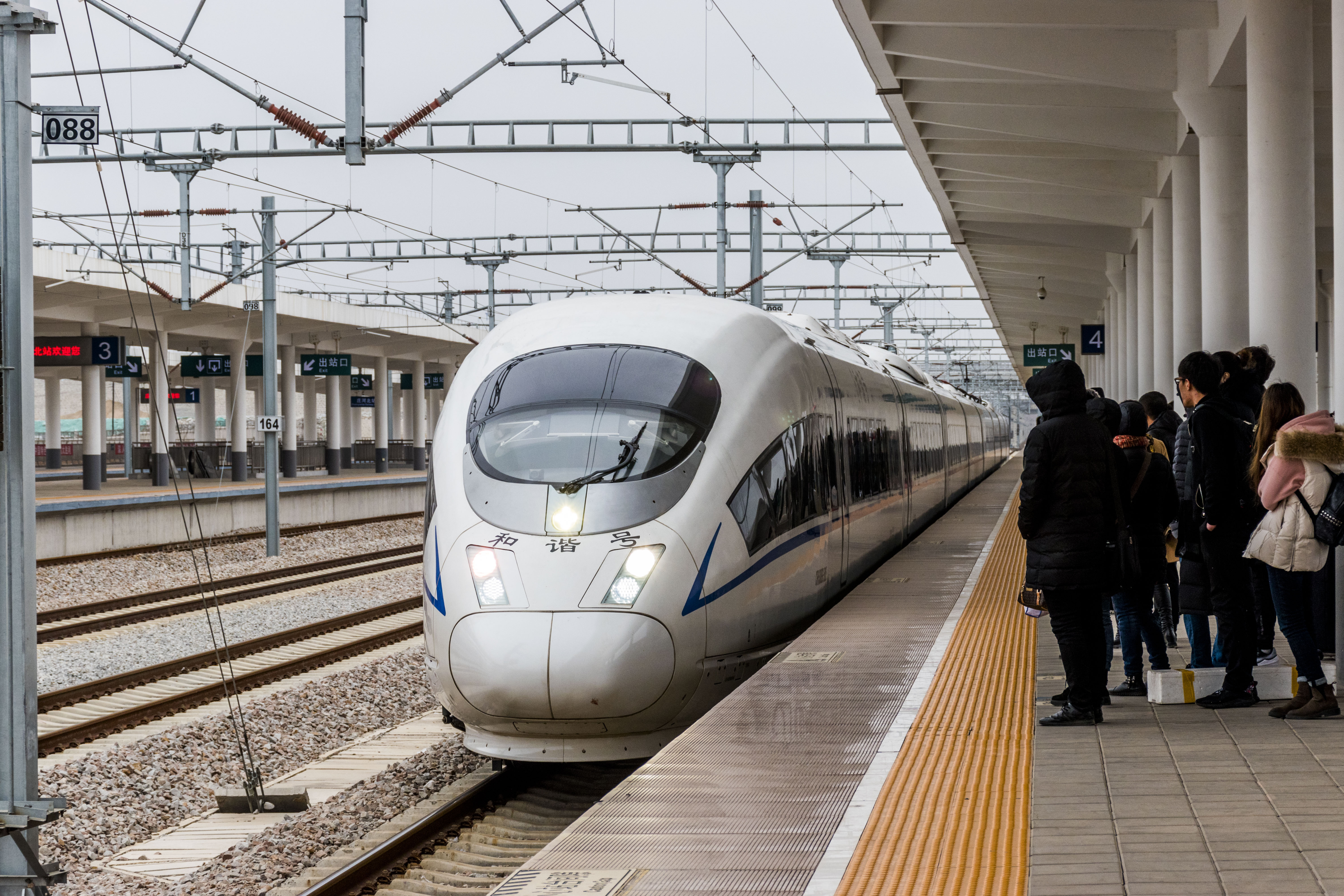

Overview
- Native name: 丹大城际铁路 丹大快铁 丹大快速铁路 沿海通道丹东至大连段
- Status: Operational
- Owner: China Railway
- Locale: Dandong and Dalian, Liaoning province
- Termini: Dalian; Dandong
- Stations: 18

Service
- Type: High-speed rail
- System: China Railway High-speed
- Services: 1
- Operator: CR Shenyang

History
- Opened: 17 December 2015

Technical
- Line length: 292 km (181 mi)
- Number of tracks: 2 (Double-track)
- Track gauge: 1,435 mm (4 ft 8 1/2 in) standard gauge
- Electrification: 25 kV 50 Hz AC (Overhead line)
- Operating speed: 250 km/h (160 mph)

The Dandong–Dalian intercity railway (simplified Chinese: 丹大城际铁路; traditional Chinese: 丹大城際鐵路; pinyin: Dān-Dà Chéngjì Tiělù) is a high-speed line operated by China Railway High-speed within the Liaodong Peninsula of Liaoning province, connecting the coastal cities of Dandong and Dalian.

== Overview ==
Dandong–Dalian intercity railway is broken down into three segments: Dandong–Zhuanghe, Zhuanghe–Dengshahe, and Dengshahe–Dalian. It will have a total length of about 292 km (181 mi), of which 94 km (58 mi) will be in the Dandong prefectural area, 198 km (123 mi) will be in the Dalian region. The total investment is estimated to be about 14.7 billion yuan with a design speed of 200 km/h (120 mph) of primarily double tracked electrified railway. The construction period was estimated to take about three and a half years and was started on 17 March 2010. It started operation on 17 December 2015.

== History ==
=== Planning phase ===
- 21 April 2009 – Liaoning Provincial Government and the Ministry of Railways signed the "On the strengthening of Liaoning railway construction Minutes", which set a railway design speed of 250 km/h (160 mph) along a double track line electrified railway for passengers and freight.
- 28 June 2009 – Ministry of Railways jointly with the provincial government reported to the National Development and Reform Commission about their studies on this project.
- 19–21 December 2009 – Ministry of Railways held preliminary design review meeting, formally adopting the project preliminary design review.

=== Construction phase ===
- 17 March 2010 – Dandong – Zhuanghe section started.
- 2 December 2010 – First bridge girder erection in the Donggang, Liaoning, area, well north of the town of Wolong with several large bridges completed.

=== Operation phase ===
- 17 December 2015 – Start operation.
