= Shenyang–Dandong intercity railway =

Railway line in Liaoning, China

Shenyang–Dandong intercity railway 沈丹客运专线
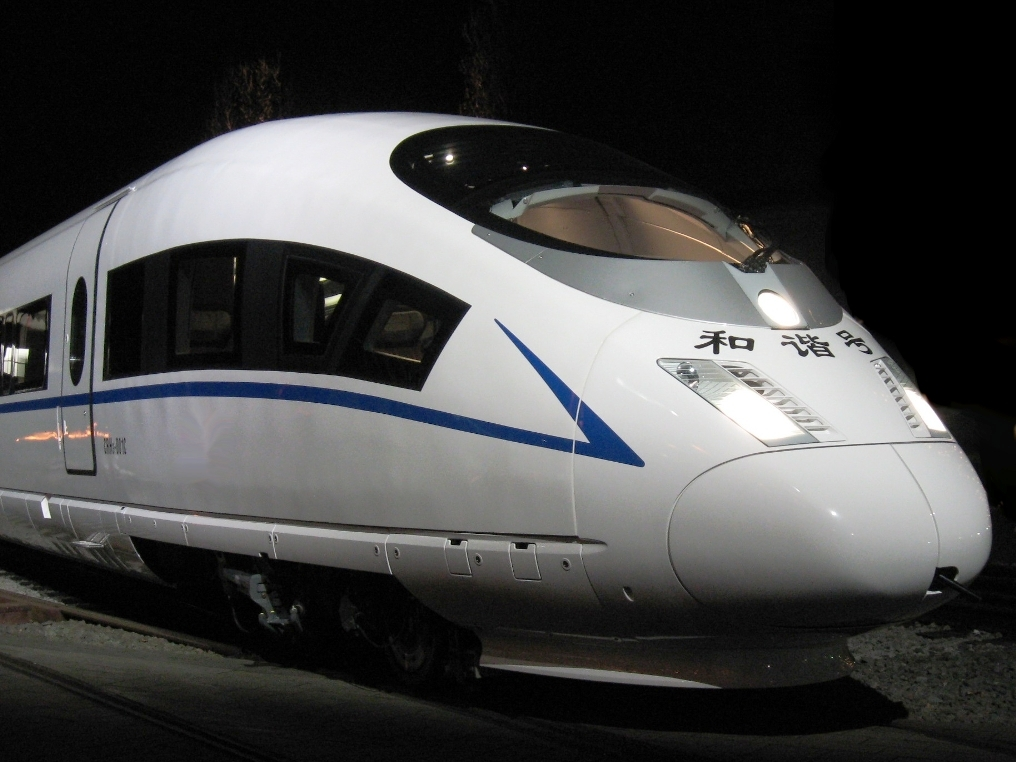
- Shenyang–Dandong intercity railway

Overview
- Status: Operational
- Locale: Shenyang, Benxi, and Dandong; Liaoning Province
- Termini: Shenyang South; Dandong
- Stations: 8

Service
- Type: High-speed rail
- Services: 1
- Operator(s): China Railway Shenyang Group

Technical
- Line length: 223.667 km (139 mi)
- Track gauge: 4 ft 8 1/2 in (1,435 mm)
- Operating speed: 250 km/h

The Shenyang–Dandong intercity railway, also known as the Shendan intercity railway or Shenyang–Dandong passenger railway, is a high-speed rail line within Liaoning province, connecting the cities of Shenyang and Dandong. The railway has been built to a design speed of 250 km/h (160 mph), consisting of double track electrified railway. The first public trains on the line started operating September 1, 2015.

== Overview ==
Shenyang–Dandong intercity railway is 223.677 km (138.986 mi) long with new rail lines making up 208.676 km (129.665 mi) of its length. The project was a joint venture project between the former Chinese Ministry of Railways and the Liaoning Provincial Government, jointly investing a total of 26.88 billion yuan, consisting of 24.88 billion yuan for rail construction and rolling stock acquisition costing 2 billion yuan. Works started on March 17, 2010, was completed before September 2015. After the opening of the railway the journey from Shenyang to Dandong has been shorten from 3.5 hours travel time to just over one hour.

The railway runs from Shenyang, via Benxi to Dandong. It allows for connections with the Beijing–Shenyang high-speed railway and the Harbin–Dalian high-speed railway, plus other conventional railways and other intercity rail services.

The route crosses several environmentally sensitive areas, such as the Shenyang Sujiatun District, Ma'er Mountain Biodiversity for afforestation, the Benxi Ring National Forest Park, Benxi National Geopark, Damingshan fissure ancient volcanic nature reserve, Dandong Tongyuanpu pine biomes natural five key areas of protected areas. Environmental protection is an essential and demanding part of the overall project.

The railway features a total of 86 large and medium bridges, for a combined distance of about 67.287 km (41.810 mi), accounting for 32.51% of the railway's length. The Shen 1st Avenue Bridge is the longest on the route, with a length of 2,896 m (9,501 ft) and a maximum span of 128 metres (420 ft). Sixty-three tunnels with a total length of 85.95 km (53.41 mi), account for 41.9% of the total length of the line. The longest tunnel being Nanfen, 7,349 metres (24,111 ft) long. Bridges and tunnels together account for 80.5% of the line length.

== History ==
=== Before construction phase ===
- In early 2008 – The Liaoning provincial government put forward to strengthen the Liaoning coastal economic belt by constructing a railway network, officially launching the project and the project's preparatory work
- July 2008 – The project was included by the Ministry of Railways as part of the Liaoning urban intercity railway network planning projects
- October 10, 2008 – Ministry of Railways and the provincial government signed the "On accelerating the construction of railways in Liaoning Minutes", with the railway included into the long-term railway network plan, with an initial standard for an electric railway, two-way traffic, travelling at more than 200 km/h (120 mph).
- November 25, 2008 – The Liaoning Provincial Development and Reform Commission held a coordination meeting, scheduling to start construction in 2009
- January 11, 2009 – The 3rd Institute of the China Railway Group complete the preparation of pre-feasibility report and its review by the Ministry of Railways
- January 23, 2009 – The Ministry of Railways and Liaoning government report to the State Development Planning Commission on this project
- August 21, 2009 – State Development Planning Commission gives approval for the project
- October 28, 2009 – Ministry of Land releases the pre-approved project report
- December 1, 2009 – Ministry of Environmental Protection holds a special meeting of Ministers for the consideration of the project's environmental impact report
- December 7, 2009 – National Development and Reform Commission officially approved the Shenyang–Dandong intercity railway feasibility study report

=== Construction phase ===
- March 17, 2010 – Started construction
- July 29, 2014 – Entered the track laying phase
- September 1, 2015 – public trains operating on the line
