= Suifenhe railway station =

Suifenhe railway station 绥芬河站
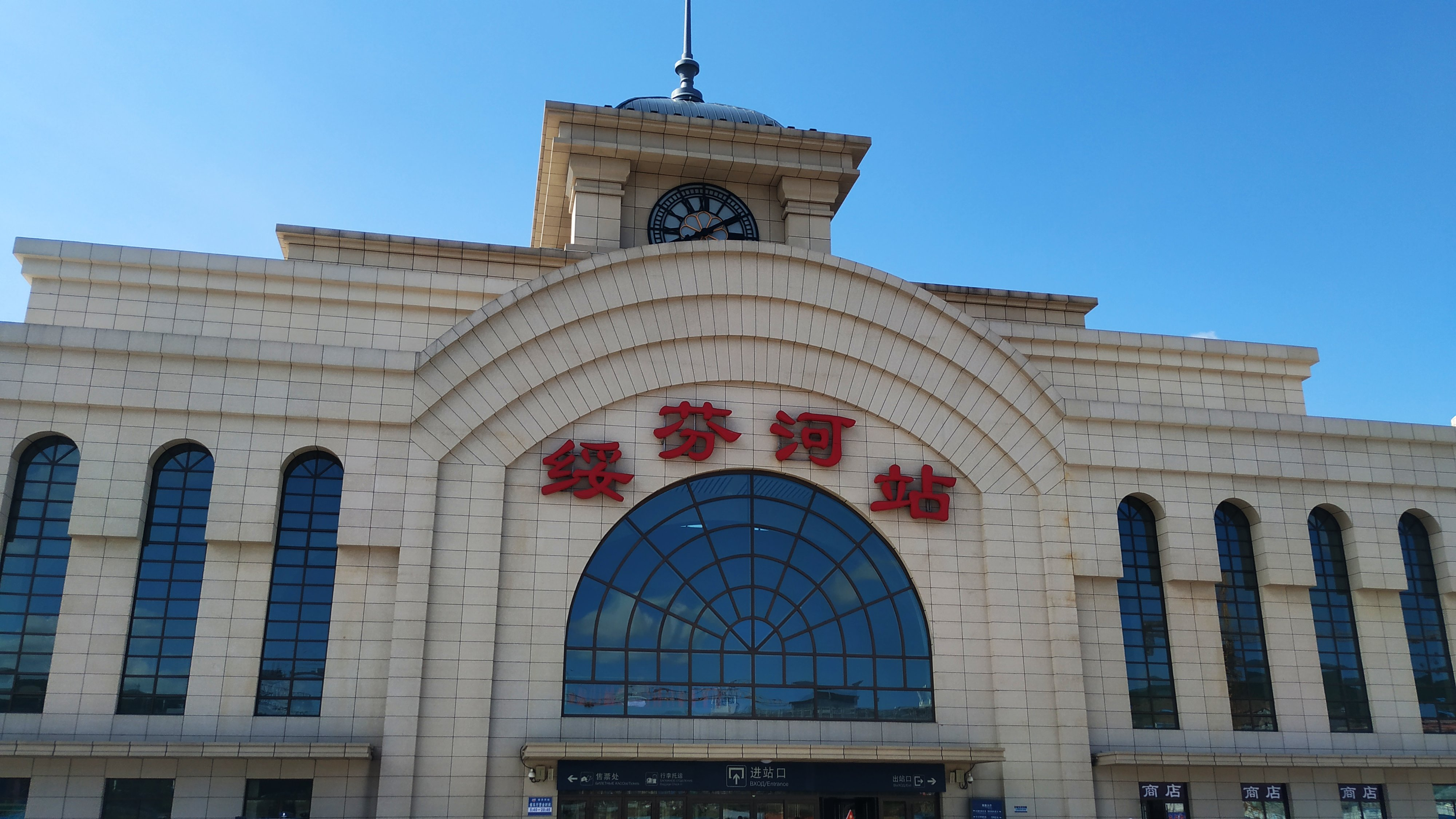
- Suifenhe railway station, shot in June 2019

Chinese name
- Simplified Chinese: 绥芬河站
- Traditional Chinese: 綏芬河站
Transcriptions
Standard Mandarin
- Hanyu Pinyin: Suífēnhé Zhàn

General information
- Location: Ussuri Street, Suifenhe, Mudanjiang, Heilongjiang Province, China
- Coordinates: 44°24′15″N 131°7′45″E
- Operator: CR Harbin
- Line: Harbin-Suifenhe Railway
- Platforms: 5
- Tracks: 6

Other information
- Station code: TMIS code: 62231; Telegraph code: SFB; Pinyin code: SFH
- Classification: First class station

History
- Opened: 1899
- Rebuilt: April 1, 2014
Location

Suifenhe Port
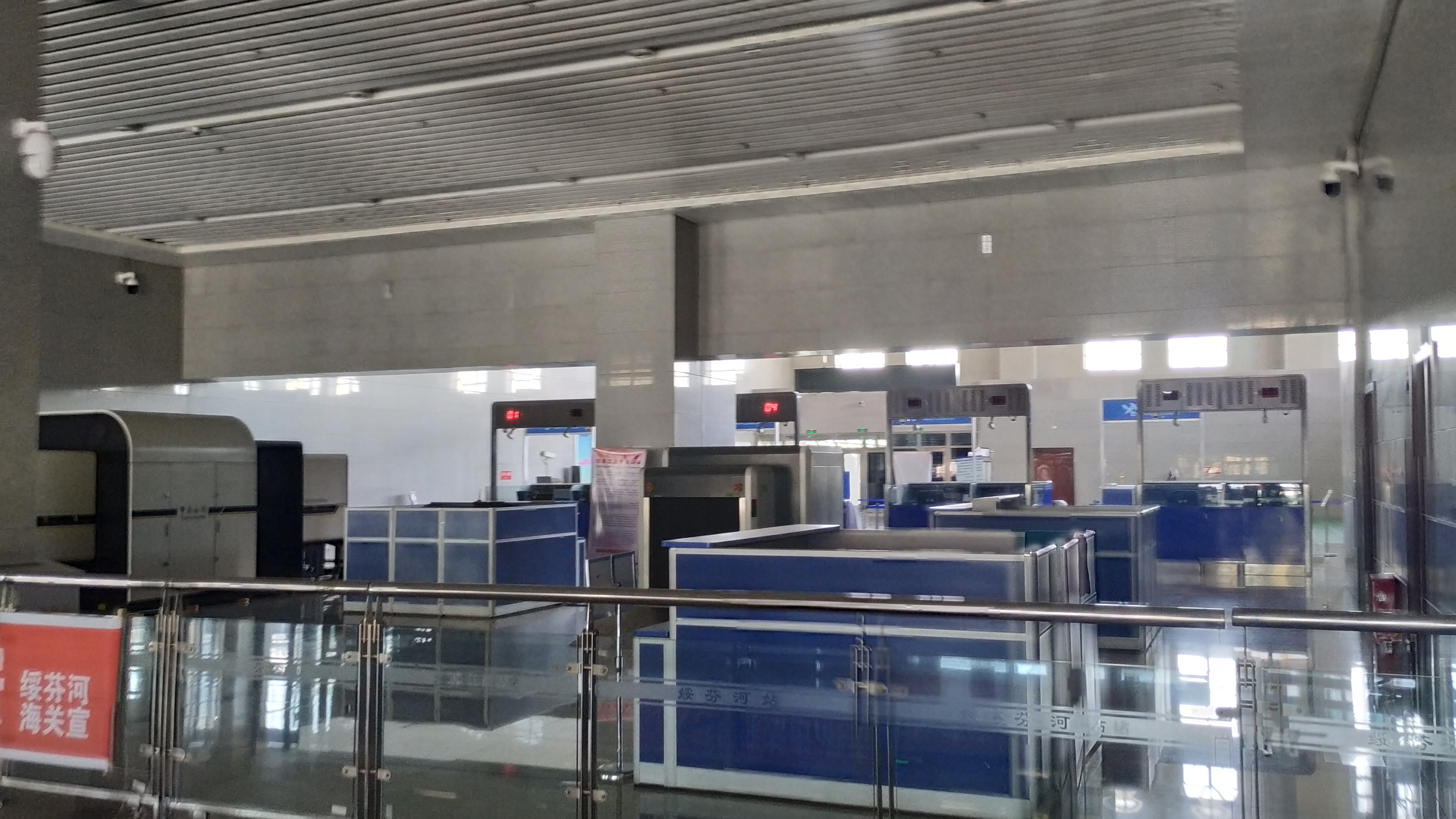
- Interactive map of Suifenhe Port

Location
- Country: China
- Location: Suifenhe, Mudanjiang, Heilongjiang Province

Details
- Opened: October 1952
- Type of Harbor: National First-Class Railway Port

Suifenhe railway station (simplified Chinese: 绥芬河站; traditional Chinese: 綏芬河站; pinyin: Suífēnhé Zhàn) is the terminal railway station on the Harbin-Suifenhe Railway, located in the Sino-Russo border city Suifenhe. To the west, it is connected to Mudanjiang and Harbin by high-speed rail and ordinary trains; to the east, it operates an international shuttle train to Grodekovo station in Russia.

== History ==
Suifenhe railway station was established by Tsarist Russia in 1899, with its station building constructed in 1902. In 1929, it was damaged due to Sino-Soviet conflict and restored to its current state in October of the same year. In 1935, the station, together with the railway lines, was sold to South Manchuria Railway by the Soviet Union at a cost of 140 million yen. In 1936, the railway line from Suifenhe station to the Soviet Union was blocked by Japanese troops, cutting off rail transport between China and the Soviet Union. It was not reopened until August 1945.

The station continued to be used after the founding of the People's Republic of China in 1949 and was renovated in 1993. On October 10, 1999, it was included in the fourth batch of cultural relic protection units in Heilongjiang Province. In 2013, the former station building was inscribed on the 7th batch of Major Historical and Cultural Sites Protected at the National Level as part of the Chinese Eastern Railway complex.

In 2016, the new station and station building were completed, while the old one was converted into Chinese Eastern Railway Memorial Museum.

== Gallery ==
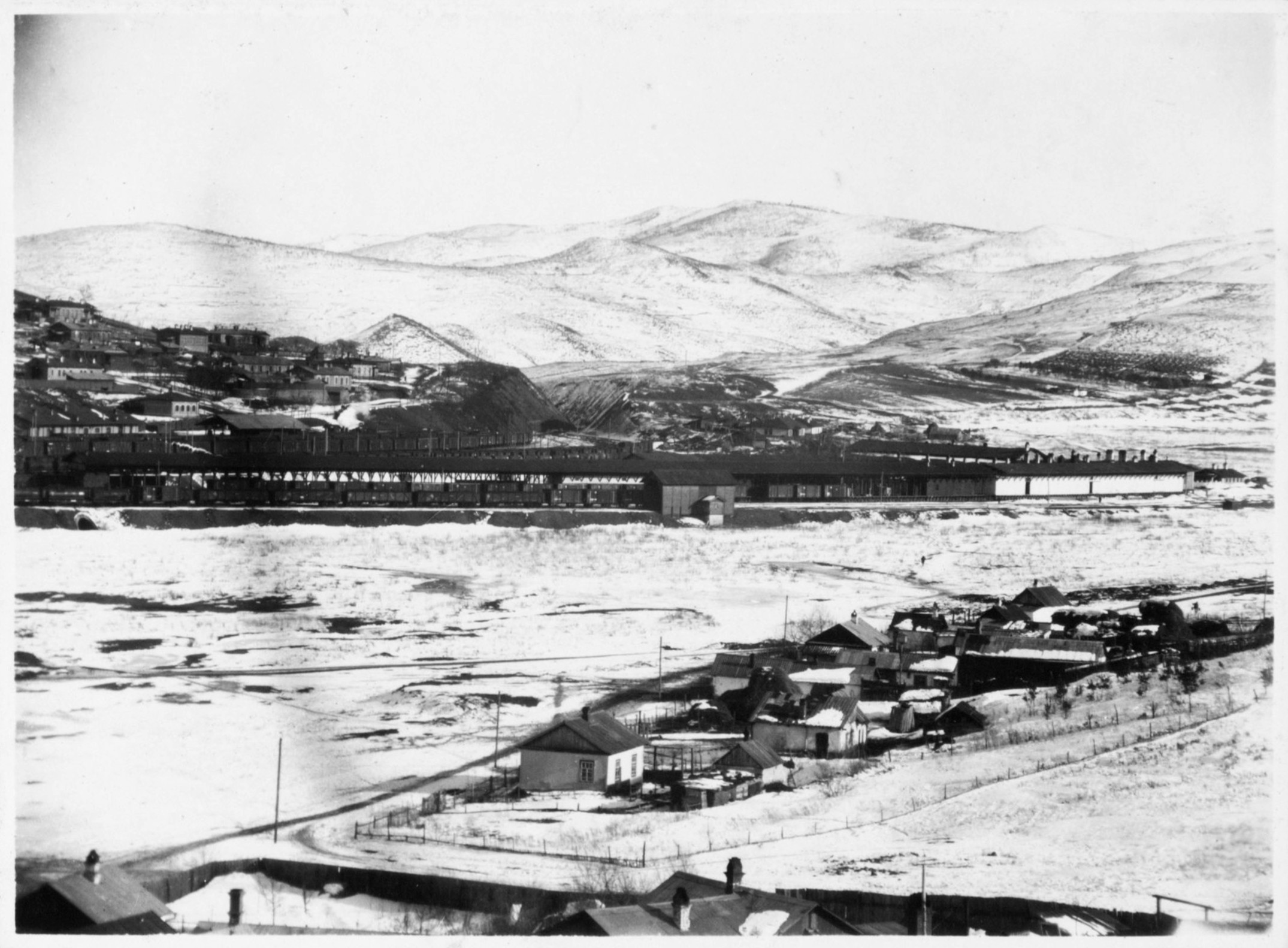
Suifenhe railway station (Japanese: ボクラニチナヤ驛) in 1932

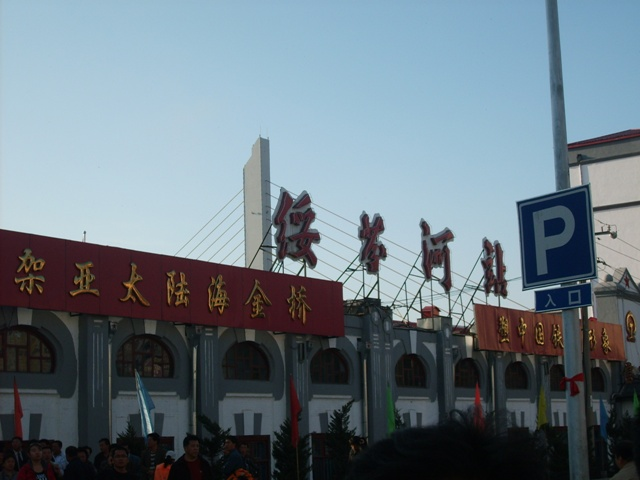
Old building of Suifenhe railway station in October 2007

== Operation ==
Preceding station	&	Following station
Terminus	Suifenhe-Grodekovo railway	Rassypnaya Pad' towards Grodekovo

Preceding station	China Railway	Following station
Suiyang towards Harbin	Harbin–Suifenhe railway	Terminus
