= Shijiazhuang–Taiyuan high-speed railway =

Railway line in China

Qingdao–Taiyuan high-speed railway Shijiazhuang–Taiyuan section 青太高速铁路石太段

Overview
- Owner: China Railway
- Locale: Hebei and Shanxi

Service
- Type: High-speed rail
- Operator(s): China Railway High-speed

History
- Opened: April 1, 2009; 16 years ago

Technical
- Line length: 189 km (117 mi)
- Track gauge: 1,435 mm (4 ft 8 1/2 in)
- Electrification: 50 Hz, 25,000 V
- Operating speed: 250 km/h (160 mph)

The Shijiazhuang–Taiyuan high-speed railway, or the Shitai passenger railway (simplified Chinese: 石太客运专线; traditional Chinese: 石太客運專線; pinyin: Shí-Tài Kèyùn Zhuān Xiàn) is a 190-kilometre-long (120 mi) high-speed railway operated by China Railway High-speed, running from Shijiazhuang to Taiyuan, respectively the provincial capitals of Hebei and Shanxi, at 250 kilometres per hour (160 mph). The railway opened on April 1, 2009. It now forms part of the Qingdao–Yinchuan corridor.

The railway crosses the Taihang mountain range through the Taihang Tunnel, which, at almost 28 kilometres (17 mi) long, is (as of 2010) the longest railway tunnel in China.

== History ==
- June 11, 2005: Construction of this line began.
- December 22, 2007: the 27,848 m (17.304 mi)-long Taihang Tunnel, was broken through.
- December 25, 2008: TISCO Bridge was completed, bringing the Shijiazhuang-Taiyuan PDL more than a week ahead of the scheduled construction time with all track laying completed.
- January 1, 2009: the official opening.
- February 18, 2009: EMU test car running.
- April 1, 2009: EMU put into formal operation.

== Services ==
The Shijiazhuang–Taiyuan high-speed railway is used by G- and D-series high-speed trains. Initially, they mostly ran between Taiyuan and Shijiazhuang. With the opening of the Beijing–Guangzhou high-speed railway, which runs through Shijiazhuang, in December 2012, almost all of these trains have been extended beyond Shijiazhuang; most of them now continue north to Beijing, while some go south, to Wuhan, Guangzhou, and other points along the line.

== See also ==
- Shijiazhuang–Taiyuan Railway
