= Harbin–Mudanjiang intercity railway =

High-speed railway in Heilongjiang Province, China

Harbin–Mudanjiang intercity railway 哈牡客运专线
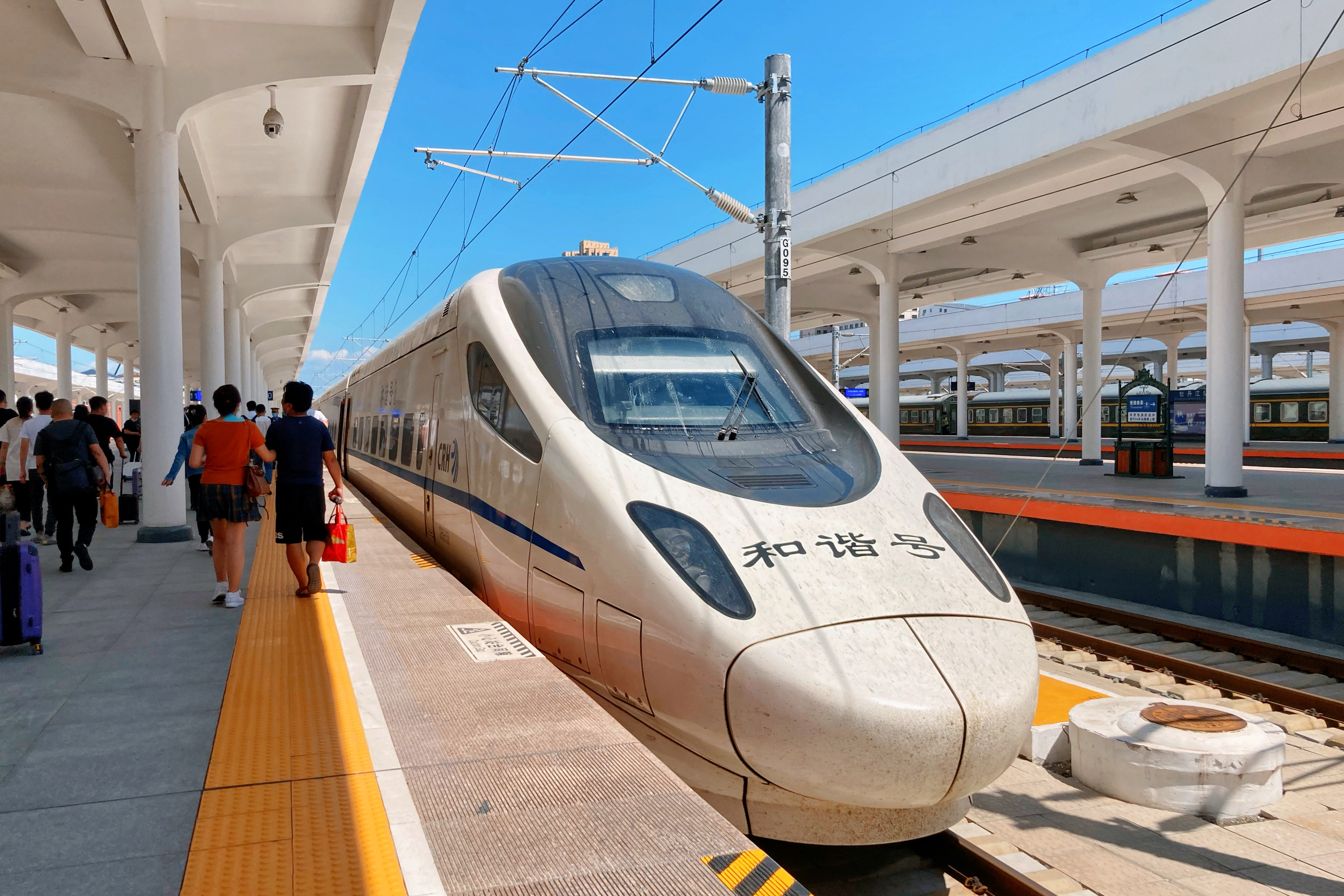
- Train at Mudanjiang Station

Overview
- Status: Operating
- Locale: Heilongjiang Province, China
- Termini: Harbin; Mudanjiang

Service
- Services: 1
- Operator(s): China Railway Harbin Group

History
- Opened: December 25, 2018

Technical
- Line length: 293.2 km (182 mi)
- Track gauge: 1,435 mm (4 ft 8 1/2 in)
- Operating speed: 250 km/h (155 mph)

Harbin–Mudanjiang intercity railway is a high-speed railway in Heilongjiang Province, China, between the cities Harbin and Mudanjiang. It is a passenger dedicated line, with a design speed of 250 km/h (155 mph) and a total length 293.2 km (182.2 mi). Starting in Harbin, it leads east to Acheng, into mountains at Mao'ershan, to Shangzhi, again through the mountains to the southeast, Weihe, Yabuli, Hengdaohezi, Hailin and on to the end at Mudanjiang station. Future proposals for this line could see it extended across the border into Russia and the Russian port city of Vladivostok.

== Overview ==
Harbin–Mudanjiang intercity railway is a joint venture by the China Railway Corporation, the Heilongjiang Provincial government and Harbin Railway Bureau.

- February 2014, Approval for the project given by China's National Development and Reform Commission and it is expected to need a total investment of 36.52 billion RMB. The project is expected to start construction in 2015, with completion due by 2019.
- November 5, 2014 - Special project feasibility report was officially approved by the National Development and Reform Commission.
- December 15, 2014 - Construction site officially started on the line near Hailin Gantt town Weihushan exit tunnel.
- December 25, 2018 - Started to operate.

Since the opening of the railway, the Harbin to Mudanjiang journey time is around one hour, and the Harbin to Suifenhe (on the border with Russia) journey takes around two hours.

== Stations ==
Harbin, Xinxiangfang North, Acheng North, Mao'ershan, Shangzhi South, Yimianpo North, Weihe West, Yabuli West, Hengdaohezi East, Hailin North, Mudanjiang West(reserved site) and Mudanjiang.
