= Urban rail transit in China =

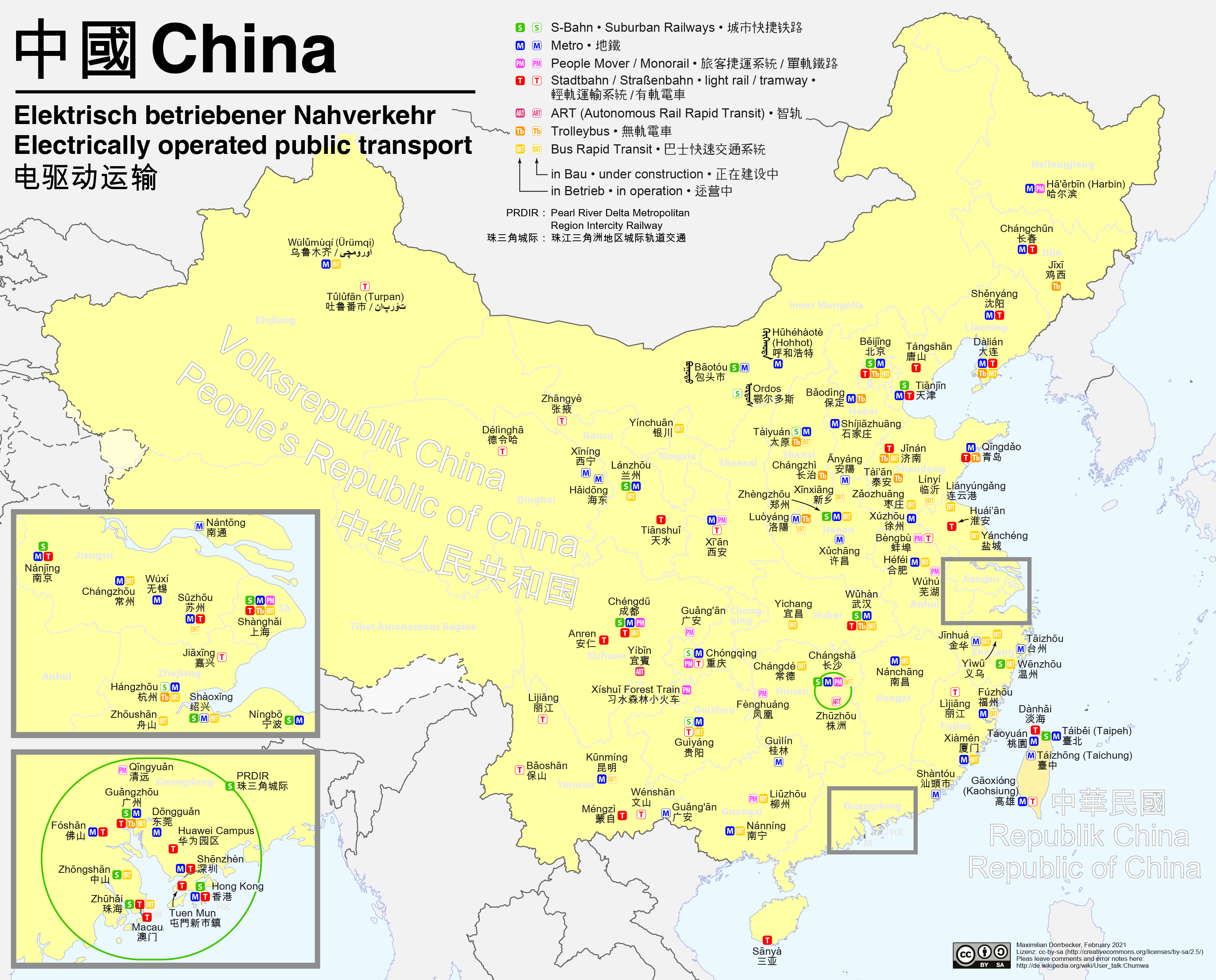
Map of cities in Greater China (mainland China, Hong Kong, Macau and Taiwan) with rapid transit, commuter rail and light rail systems. The two higher-resolution maps to the left show the Yangtze River Delta (YRD) and Pearl River Delta (PRD) regions.

Urban rail transit in China encompasses a broad range of urban and suburban electric passenger rail mass transit systems including subway, light rail, tram and maglev. Some classifications also include non-rail bus rapid transport.

As of November 2026, China has the world's longest urban rail transit system with 12,502.586 km (7,768.747 mi) of urban rail nationwide in 339 metro lines in 50 cities, accounting for 9 of the 10 longest metro systems, with the exceptions of the Moscow Metro.

Half of the top 10 busiest metro systems are in China, and the Shanghai Metro, though started operating in 1993, is now the longest metro system worldwide.

== History ==
Several Chinese cities had urban electric tramways in the early 20th century, most of which were dismantled in the 1950s–1970s. The only surviving tramways are in Dalian (Dairen) and Changchun (see trams in Dalian and trams in Changchun). Nanjing (Nanking) had an urban railway from 1907 to 1958.

The first subway in China was built in Beijing in 1969 (but it was only handed over to civilian control in 1981, and trial operations ended later that same year; before which, credentials were required). The Tianjin Metro followed in 1984. The MTR Corporation Limited from across the border in Hong Kong has investment, consulting and management stakes in the rapid transit systems of several mainland Chinese cities (having completed their first section of subway and entered into revenue operation in 1979 in New Kowloon, at the time when the territory was under British rule).

The rapid growth of the Chinese economy since the 1980s has created a huge surge in demand for urban transport. This prompted cities across China to draft proposals for subway networks, with Shanghai and Guangzhou opening their first subway sections in the 1990s, inspiring more cities to propose their own networks. In 1995, the Central Government, alarmed by the high costs and financial debt of these ambitious subway plans, issued a "notice on the suspension of approval of urban underground rapid rail transit projects," barring new subway systems outside Beijing, Tianjin, Guangzhou, and Shanghai from being built. At the time Nanjing, Wuhan, Chongqing, Dalian and Shenzhen had advanced proposals waiting to be approved. Wuhan, Chongqing, Dalian managed to circumvent the moratorium on subway construction by constructing and opening lower-cost elevated lines, light metros, and monorails in the early 2000s. Changchun was the first city to construct a real light rail system in China, which began operating in 2002. Its first transit line, Line 3, is a light rail line that is not fully grade-separated, still having four level crossings as of 2023. It's also the only rapid transit system in China that combines light rail and rapid transit lines, which can be directly transferred between each other.

Rapid urbanization in China led to severe congestion and pollution in urban areas, prompting the suspension to be lifted. Initially, light metro lines using small profile and shorter rolling stock were constructed to reduce costs. It was assumed that, as ridership grows, the line will operate trains with a low headway to increase capacity. This design paradigm was known in China as "small rolling stock, high density" operation. However, after a few years operating, many of these lines such as Guangzhou Metro Line 3, Line 6, Shanghai Metro Line 6, and Line 8 were severely overcapacity. Guangzhou Metro Line 3 was able to reconfigure from 3-car to 6-car trains to slightly alleviate overcapacity. This led many cities, such as Beijing, Guangzhou, Wuhan, and Chengdu, to adopt higher-capacity designs on newer lines.

Since the mid-2000s, the growth of rapid transit systems in Chinese cities has rapidly accelerated, with most of the world's new subway mileage in the past decade opening in China. From 2009 to 2015, China built 87 mass transit rail lines, totaling 3,100 km (1,900 mi), in 25 cities at the cost of ¥988.6 billion. In 2016, the Chinese government lowered the minimum population criteria for a city to start planning a metro system from 3 million to 1.5 million residents. As part of its 13th Five Year Plan, the Chinese government published a transport whitepaper titled "Development of China's Transport". The plan envisions a more sustainable transport system, with priority given to high-capacity public transit, particularly urban rail transit and bus rapid transit. All cities with over 3 million residents will start or continue to develop urban rail networks. Regional rail networks will be constructed internally to connect and integrate urban agglomerations such as the Jingjinji, Yangtze River Delta, and Pearl River Delta areas. In 2017, some 43 smaller third-tier cities in China have received approval to develop subway lines.

=== Commencement dates of lines and extensions ===
Legend

– Lines / extensions in operation.
– Lines / extensions under testing.

lines and extensions by commencement date
Livery	Line	Section		Commencement	Length
	Line 1 (Beijing Subway)	Pingguoyuan	Gucheng	1973-04-23	02.6 km (1.62 mi)
	Line 1 (Beijing Subway)	Gucheng	Yuquan Lu	1971-11-07	05.4 km (3.36 mi)
	Line 1 (Beijing Subway)	Yuquan Lu	Gongzhufen	1971-08-05	04.9 km (3.04 mi)
	Line 1 (Beijing Subway)	Gongzhufen	Nanlishi Lu	1969-10-01	03.7 km (2.30 mi)
	Line 1 (Beijing Subway)	Nanlishi Lu	Fuxingmen	1987-12-28	00.4 km (0.25 mi)
	Line 1 (Beijing Subway)	Fuxingmen	Xidan	1992-09-12	01.6 km (0.99 mi)
	Line 1 (Beijing Subway)	Xidan	Tian'anmenxi	2000-06-28	01.3 km (0.81 mi)
	Line 1 (Beijing Subway)	Tian'anmenxi	Sihuidong	1999-09-28	10.1 km (6.28 mi)
	Line 2 (Beijing Subway)	Changchun Jie	Beijing railway station	1987-12-28 (Note: Line realignment, previously part of Line 1 since 1 October 1969 (1969-10-01).)	06.1 km (3.79 mi)
	Line 2 (Beijing Subway)	Beijing railway station	Jianguomen	1987-12-28	01.0 km (0.62 mi)
	Line 2 (Beijing Subway)	Jianguomen	Fuxingmen	1984-09-20	15.2 km (9.44 mi)
	Line 2 (Beijing Subway)	Fuxingmen	Changchun Jie	1987-12-28	01.2 km (0.75 mi)
	Line 3 (Beijing Subway)	Dongsi Shitiao	Dongbabei	2024-12-15	14.7 km (9.1 mi)
	Line 4 (Beijing Subway)	Anheqiaobei	Gongyi Xiqiao	2009-09-28	28.2 km (17.52 mi)
	Line 5 (Beijing Subway)	Tiantongyuanbei	Songjiazhuang	2007-10-07	27.6 km (17.15 mi)
	Line 6 (Beijing Subway)	Jin'anqiao	Haidian Wuluju	2018-12-30	10.556 km (6.56 mi)
	Line 6 (Beijing Subway)	Haidian Wuluju	Caofang	2012-12-30	29.882 km (18.57 mi)
	Line 6 (Beijing Subway)	Caofang	Lucheng	2014-12-28	12.751 km (7.92 mi)
	Line 6 (Beijing Subway)	Lucheng	Luyang	2025-12-??	2.1 km (1.3 mi)
	Line 7 (Beijing Subway)	Beijing West railway station	Jiaohuachang	2014-12-28	23.7 km (14.73 mi)
	Line 7 (Beijing Subway)	Jiaohuachang	Huazhuang	2019-12-28	16.6 km (10.31 mi)
	Line 7 (Beijing Subway)	Huazhuang	Universal Resort	2021-08-26	1.769 km (1.10 mi)
	Line 8 (Beijing Subway)	Zhuxinzhuang	Huilongguan Dongdajie	2013-12-28	06.359 km (3.95 mi)
	Line 8 (Beijing Subway)	Huilongguan Dongdajie	Forest Park South Gate	2011-12-31	10.700 km (6.65 mi)
	Line 8 (Beijing Subway)	Forest Park South Gate	Beitucheng	2008-07-19	03.583 km (2.23 mi)
	Line 8 (Beijing Subway)	Beitucheng	Gulou Dajie	2012-12-30	03.375 km (2.10 mi)
	Line 8 (Beijing Subway)	Gulou Dajie	Nanluogu Xiang	2013-12-28	02.090 km (1.30 mi)
	Line 8 (Beijing Subway)	Nanluogu Xiang	National Art Museum	2018-12-30	01.88 km (1.17 mi)
	Line 8 (Beijing Subway)	National Art Museum	Zhushikou	2021-12-31	4.3 km (2.67 mi)
	Line 8 (Beijing Subway)	Zhushikou	Yinghai	2018-12-30	16.4 km (10.19 mi)
	Line 9 (Beijing Subway)	National Library	Beijing West railway station	2012-12-30	10.282 km (6.39 mi)
	Line 9 (Beijing Subway)	Beijing West railway station	Guogongzhuang	2011-12-31	05.349 km (3.32 mi)
	Line 10 (Beijing Subway)	Xiju	Bagou	2012-12-30	13.843 km (8.60 mi)
	Line 10 (Beijing Subway)	Bagou	Jingsong	2008-07-19	24.680 km (15.34 mi)
	Line 10 (Beijing Subway)	Jingsong	Shoujingmao	2012-12-30	15.932 km (9.90 mi)
	Line 10 (Beijing Subway)	Shoujingmao	Xiju	2013-05-05	03.420 km (2.13 mi)
	Line 11 (Beijing Subway)	Jin'anqiao	Xinshougang (Shougang Park)	2021-12-31	1.5 km (0.93 mi)
	Line 11 (Beijing Subway)	Jin'anqiao	Moshikou	2023-12-30	1.4 km (0.87 mi)
	Line 12 (Beijing Subway)	Dongbabei	Sijiqing Qiao	2024-12-15	27.5 km (17.1 mi)
	Line 13 (Beijing Subway)	Xizhimen	Huoying	2002-09-28	20.5 km (12.74 mi)
	Line 13 (Beijing Subway)	Huoying	Dongzhimen	2003-01-28	20.0 km (12.43 mi)
	Line 14 (Beijing Subway)	Zhangguozhuang	Xiju	2013-05-05	12.4 km (7.71 mi)
	Line 14 (Beijing Subway)	Xiju	Beijing South railway station	2021-12-31	4 km (2.5 mi)
	Line 14 (Beijing Subway)	Beijing South railway station	Jintai Lu	2015-12-26	16.6 km (10.31 mi)
	Line 14 (Beijing Subway)	Jintai Lu	Shangezhuang	2014-12-28	14.8 km (9.20 mi)
	Line 15 (Beijing Subway)	Qinghua Donglu Xikou	Wangjingxi	2014-12-28	09.944 km (6.18 mi)
	Line 15 (Beijing Subway)	Wangjingxi	Houshayu	2010-12-30	17.725 km (11.01 mi)
	Line 15 (Beijing Subway)	Houshayu	Fengbo	2011-12-31	11.060 km (6.87 mi)
	Line 16 (Beijing Subway)	Bei'anhe	Xiyuan	2016-12-31	19.6 km (12.2 mi)
	Line 16 (Beijing Subway)	Xiyuan	Ganjia Kou	2020-12-31	10.93 km (6.79 mi)
	Line 16 (Beijing Subway)	Ganjia Kou	Yuyuantan Dongmen (Yuyuantan Park East Gate)	2021-12-31	0.98 km (0.61 mi)
	Line 16 (Beijing Subway)	Yuyuantan Dongmen (Yuyuantan Park East Gate)	Yushuzhuang	2022-12-31	14.2 km (8.8 mi)
	Line 16 (Beijing Subway)	Yushuzhuang	Wanpingcheng	2023-12-30	2.7 km (1.7 mi)
	Line 17 (Beijing Subway)	Shilihe	Jiahuihu	2021-12-31	15.8 km (9.8 mi)
	Line 17 (Beijing Subway)	Weilaikexuechengbei (Future Science City North)	Workers' Stadium	2023-12-30	24.9 km (15.5 mi)
	Line 17 (Beijing Subway)	Workers' Stadium	Shilihe	2025-12-??	8.2 km (5.1 mi)
	Line 18 (Beijing Subway)	Malianwa	Tiantongyuandong	2025-12-??	19.8 km (12.3 mi)
	Line 19 (Beijing Subway)	Mudanyuan	Xingong	2021-12-31	20.9 km (13.0 mi)
	Line S1 (Beijing Subway)	Shichang	Jin'anqiao	2017-12-30	9.1 km (5.65 mi)
	Line S1 (Beijing Subway)	Jin'anqiao	Pingguoyuan	2021-12-31	1.2 km (0.75 mi)
	Batong line	Sihui	Tuqiao	2003-12-27	18.9 km (11.74 mi)
	Batong line	Tuqiao	Huazhuang	2019-12-28	2.238 km (1.39 mi)
	Batong line	Huazhuang	Universal Resort	2021-08-26	1.863 km (1.16 mi)
	Capital Airport Express	Dongzhimen	Terminal 3/Terminal 2	2008-07-19	28.1 km (17.46 mi)
	Capital Airport Express	Dongzhimen	Beixinqiao	2021-12-31	1.8 km (1.12 mi)
	Changping line	Changping Xishankou	Nanshao	2015-12-26	21.3 km (13.24 mi)
	Changping line	Nanshao	Xi'erqi	2010-12-30	10.6 km (6.59 mi)
	Changping line	Xi'erqi	Qinghe railway station	2021-12-31	1.6 km (0.99 mi)
	Changping line	Qinghe railway station	Xitucheng	2023-02-04	9.7 km (6.03 mi)
	Changping line	Xitucheng	Jimen Qiao	2024-12-15	0.7 km (0.43 mi)
	Daxing Airport Express	Caoqiao	Daxing Airport	2019-09-26	41.36 km (25.70 mi)
	Daxing line	Gongyi Xiqiao	Tiangong Yuan	2010-12-30	21.7 km (13.48 mi)
	Fangshan line	Dongguantounan	Guogongzhuang	2020-12-31	5 km (3.11 mi)
	Fangshan line	Guogongzhuang	Dabaotai	2011-12-31	24.79 km (15.4 mi)
	Fangshan line	Dabaotai	Suzhuang	2010-12-30	24.79 km (15.4 mi)
	Fangshan line	Suzhuang	Yancundong	2017-12-30	02.2 km (1.4 mi)
	Yanfang line	Yancundong	Yanshan	2017-12-30	13.37 km (8.31 mi)
	Yizhuang line	Songjiazhuang	Ciqu	2010-12-30	21.4 km (13.30 mi)
	Yizhuang line	Ciqu	Yizhuang Railway Station	2018-12-30	1.334 km (0.83 mi)
	Line 1 (Changchun Rail Transit)	North Ring Road	Hongzuizi	2017-06-30	18.14 km (11.27 mi)
	Line 2 (Changchun Rail Transit)	Shuangfeng	Dongfang Square	2018-08-30	20.5 km (12.74 mi)
	Line 2 (Changchun Rail Transit)	Shuangfeng	Qiche Gongyuan	2021-10-08	4.4 km (2.73 mi)
	Line 6 (Changchun Rail Transit)	Shuangfeng	Changchun Movie Wonderland	2024-03-28	29.57 km (18.37 mi)
	Line 1 (Changsha Metro)	Kaifu District Government	Shangshuangtang	2016-06-28	23.55 km (14.63 mi)
	Line 2 (Changsha Metro)	West Meixi Lake	Wangchengpo	2015-12-28	04.279 km (2.66 mi)
	Line 2 (Changsha Metro)	Wangchengpo	Guangda	2014-04-29	22.3 km (13.86 mi)
	Line 3 (Changsha Metro)	Shantang	Guangsheng	2020-06-28	36.5 km (22.68 mi)
	Line 3 (Changsha Metro)	Xiangtan North Railway Station	Shantang	2023-06-28	17.29 km (10.74 mi)
	Line 4 (Changsha Metro)	Guanziling	Dujiaping	2019-05-26	33.5 km (20.82 mi)
	Line 5 (Changsha Metro)	Maozhutang	Shuiduhe	2020-06-28	22.5 km (13.98 mi)
	Line 6 (Changsha Metro)	Xiejiaqiao	Huanghua Airport T1 & T2	2022-06-28	48.11 km (29.89 mi)
	Changsha Maglev Express	Changshanan	Huanghua Airport	2016-05-06	18.55 km (11.53 mi)
	Line 1 (Changzhou Metro)	Forest Park	Nanxiashu	2019-09-21	34.24 km (21.28 mi)
	Line 2 (Changzhou Metro)	Qingfeng Park	Wuyi Lu	2021-06-28	19.79 km (12.30 mi)
	Line 1 (Chengdu Metro)	Weijianian	Shengxian Lake	2018-03-18	1.46 km (0.91 mi)
	Line 1 (Chengdu Metro)	Shengxian Lake	Century City	2010-09-27	18.5 km (11.50 mi)
	Line 1 (Chengdu Metro)	Century City	Guangdu	2015-07-25	05.4 km (3.36 mi)
	Line 1 (Chengdu Metro)	Guangdu	Wugensong	2018-03-18	1.21 km (0.75 mi)
	Line 1 (Chengdu Metro)	Sihe	Science City	2018-03-18	14.33 km (8.90 mi)
	Line 2 (Chengdu Metro)	Xipu Railway Station	Chadianzi Bus Terminal Station	2013-06-08	08.8 km (5.47 mi)
	Line 2 (Chengdu Metro)	Chadianzi Bus Terminal Station	Chengdu Institute of Public Administration	2012-09-16	22.4 km (13.92 mi)
	Line 2 (Chengdu Metro)	Chengdu Institute of Public Administration	Longquanyi	2014-10-26	11.1 km (6.90 mi)
	Line 3 (Chengdu Metro)	Chengdu Medical College	Chengdu Junqu General Hospital	2018-12-26	17.2 km (10.69 mi)
	Line 3 (Chengdu Metro)	Chengdu Junqu General Hospital	Taipingyuan	2016-07-31	20.33 km (12.63 mi)
	Line 3 (Chengdu Metro)	Taipingyuan	Shuangliu West Station	2018-12-26	12.3 km (7.64 mi)
	Line 4 (Chengdu Metro)	Wansheng	Intangible Cultural Heritage Park	2017-06-02	10.8 km (6.71 mi)
	Line 4 (Chengdu Metro)	Intangible Cultural Heritage Park	Wannianchang	2015-12-26	22.4 km (13.92 mi)
	Line 4 (Chengdu Metro)	Wannianchang	Xihe	2017-06-02	10.3 km (6.40 mi)
	Line 5 (Chengdu Metro)	Huagui Road	Huilong	2019-12-27	49.018 km (30.46 mi)
	Line 6 (Chengdu Metro)	Wangcong Temple	Lanjiagou	2020-12-18	69 km (43 mi)
	Line 7 (Chengdu Metro)	North Railway Station	North Railway Station	2017-12-06	38.61 km (23.99 mi)
	Line 8 (Chengdu Metro)	Lianhua	Shilidian	2020-12-18	29 km (18 mi)
	Line 9 (Chengdu Metro)	Financial City East	Huangtianba	2020-12-18	22 km (14 mi)
	Line 10 (Chengdu Metro)	Taipingyuan	Terminal 2 of Shuangliu International Airport	2017-09-06	10.937 km (6.8 mi)
	Line 10 (Chengdu Metro)	Terminal 2 of Shuangliu International Airport	Xinping	2019-12-27	27.035 km (16.8 mi)
	Line 17 (Chengdu Metro)	Jinxing	Jitouqiao	2020-12-18	5.6 km (3.5 mi)
	Line 18 (Chengdu Metro)	South Railway Station	Sancha	2020-09-27	48 km (30 mi)
	Line 18 (Chengdu Metro)	Sancha	Tianfu International Airport North	2020-12-18	20 km (12 mi)
	Line 19 (Chengdu Metro)	Jitouqiao	Jiujiang North	2023-09-22 (Note: Line realignment, previously part of Line 17 since 18 December 2020 (2020-12-18).)	19.8 km (12.3 mi)
	Line 19 (Chengdu Metro)	Jiujiang North	Tianfu International Airport North	2023-11-28	43.2 km (26.8 mi)
	Line 1 (Chongqing Rail Transit)	Chaotianmen	Xiaoshizi	2020-12-31	0.8 km (0.50 mi)
	Line 1 (Chongqing Rail Transit)	Xiaoshizi	Jiaochangkou	2011-09-27	01.4 km (0.87 mi)
	Line 1 (Chongqing Rail Transit)	Jiaochangkou	Shapingba	2011-07-28	14.2 km (8.82 mi)
	Line 1 (Chongqing Rail Transit)	Shapingba	Daxuecheng	2012-12-21	19.7 km (12.24 mi)
	Line 1 (Chongqing Rail Transit)	Daxuecheng	Jiandingpo	2014-12-30	01.9 km (1.18 mi)
	Line 1 (Chongqing Rail Transit)	Jiandingpo	Bishan	2019-12-30	5.6 km (3.48 mi)
	Line 2 (Chongqing Rail Transit)	Jiaochangkou	Daping	2004-12-11	07.66 km (4.76 mi)
	Line 2 (Chongqing Rail Transit)	Daping	Zoo	2004-11-06	04.95 km (3.08 mi)
	Line 2 (Chongqing Rail Transit)	Zoo	Xinshancun	2006-07-01	05.54 km (3.44 mi)
	Line 2 (Chongqing Rail Transit)	Xinshancun	Yudong	2014-12-31	13.15 km (8.17 mi)
	Line 3 (Chongqing Rail Transit)	Yudong	Chongqing Jiaotong University	2012-12-28	16.197 km (10.06 mi)
	Line 3 (Chongqing Rail Transit)	Chongqing Jiaotong University	Lianglukou	2011-12-30	08.66 km (5.38 mi)
	Line 3 (Chongqing Rail Transit)	Lianglukou	Yuanyang	2011-09-29	17.323 km (10.76 mi)
	Line 3 (Chongqing Rail Transit)	Yuanyang	Changfulu	2011-10-08	04.9 km (3.04 mi)
	Line 3 (Chongqing Rail Transit)	Changfulu	Terminal 2 of Jiangbei Airport	2011-12-30	06.9 km (4.29 mi)
	Line 3 (Chongqing Rail Transit)	Bijin	Jurenba	2016-12-28	11.0 km (6.84 mi)
	Line 4 (Chongqing Rail Transit)	North Square of Chongqing North Railway Station	Tangjiatuo	2018-12-28	13.1 km (8.14 mi)
	Line 4 (Chongqing Rail Transit)	Min'an Ave.	North Square of Chongqing North Railway Station	2019-01-11	2.3 km (1.43 mi)
	Line 4 (Chongqing Rail Transit)	Tangjiatuo	Huangling	2022-06-18	32.8 km (20.4 mi)
	Line 5 (Chongqing Rail Transit)	Yuegangbeilu	The EXPO Garden Center	2023-02-27	8.95 km (5.56 mi)
	Line 5 (Chongqing Rail Transit)	The EXPO Garden Center	Dalongshan	2017-12-28	13.59 km (8.44 mi)
	Line 5 (Chongqing Rail Transit)	Dalongshan	Dashiba	2018-12-24	2.51 km (1.56 mi)
	Line 5 (Chongqing Rail Transit)	Dashiba	Shiqiaopu	2023-11-30	4.7 km (2.92 mi)
	Line 5 (Chongqing Rail Transit)	Shiqiaopu	Tiaodeng	2021-01-20	18.34 km (11.40 mi)
	Jiangtiao line	Tiaodeng	Shengquansi	2022-08-06	28.22 km (17.54 mi)
	Line 6 (Chongqing Rail Transit)	Chayuan	Wulidian	2014-12-31	19.2 km (11.93 mi)
	Line 6 (Chongqing Rail Transit)	Wulidian	Kangzhuang	2012-09-28	13.91 km (8.64 mi)
	Line 6 (Chongqing Rail Transit)	Kangzhuang	Lijia	2012-12-26	03.9 km (2.42 mi)
	Line 6 (Chongqing Rail Transit)	Lijia	Yuelai	2013-05-15	12.1 km (7.52 mi)
	Line 6 (Chongqing Rail Transit)	Lijia	Beibei	2013-12-31	23.4 km (14.54 mi)
	Line 6 (Chongqing Rail Transit)	Yuelai	Shaheba	2020-12-31	13.987 km (8.69 mi)
	Line 9 (Chongqing Rail Transit)	Gaotanyan	Xingke Ave.	2022-01-25	32.29 km (20.06 mi)
	Line 9 (Chongqing Rail Transit)	Xingke Ave.	Huashigou	2023-01-18	7.8 km (4.8 mi)
	Line 10 (Chongqing Rail Transit)	Wangjiazhuang	Liyuchi	2017-12-28	33.7 km (20.9 mi)
	Line 10 (Chongqing Rail Transit)	Liyuchi	Houbao	2023-01-18	6 km (3.7 mi)
	Line 10 (Chongqing Rail Transit)	Houbao	Lanhualu	2023-11-30	3.8 km (2.4 mi)
	Line 18 (Chongqing Rail Transit)	Fuhualu	Tiaodengnan	2023-12-28	28.96 km (17.99 mi)
	Bishan SkyShuttle	Bishan station (Chongqing Rail Transit)	Bishan railway station (High-speed rail)	2021-04-16	15.4 km (9.57 mi)
	Loop line (Chongqing Rail Transit)	Chongqing Library	Haixialu	2018-12-28	33.7 km (20.94 mi)
	Loop line (Chongqing Rail Transit)	Haixialu	Erlang	2019-12-30	9.5 km (5.90 mi)
	Loop line (Chongqing Rail Transit)	Erlang	Chongqing Library	2021-01-20	7.6 km (4.72 mi)
	Line 1 (Dalian Metro)	Yaojia	Fuguo Street	2015-10-30	16.50 km (10.25 mi)
	Line 1 (Dalian Metro)	Fuguo Street	Convention and Exhibition Center	2016-01-29	01.21 km (0.75 mi)
	Line 1 (Dalian Metro)	Convention and Exhibition Center	Hekou	2017-06-07	05.63 km (3.50 mi)
	Line 2 (Dalian Metro)	Xinzhaizi	Dalian North Railway Station	2022-09-30	11.56 km (7.18 mi)
	Line 2 (Dalian Metro)	Xinzhaizi	Airport	2018-06-28	03.12 km (1.94 mi)
	Line 2 (Dalian Metro)	Airport	Conference Center	2015-05-22	20.7 km (12.86 mi)
	Line 2 (Dalian Metro)	Conference Center	Haizhiyun	2017-06-07	03.78 km (2.35 mi)
	Line 3 (Dalian Metro)	Dalian Railway Station	Golden Pebble Beach	2003-05-01	49.15 km (30.54 mi)
	Line 3 (Dalian Metro)	Dalian Development Area	Jiuli	2008-12-28	14.3 km (8.89 mi)
	Line 5 (Dalian Metro)	Hutan Xinqu	Houguan	2023-03-17	24.48 km (15.21 mi)
	Line 12 (Dalian Metro)	Hekou	Caidaling	2017-06-07	01.27 km (0.79 mi)
	Line 12 (Dalian Metro)	Caidaling	Lüshun New Port	2013-12-30	37.52 km (23.31 mi)
	Line 13 (Dalian Metro)	Pulandian Zhenxing Street	Jiuli	2021-12-28	43 km (27 mi)
	Line 2 (Dongguan Rail Transit)	Humen Railway Station	Dongguan Railway Station	2016-05-27	37.7 km (23.43 mi)
	Line 2 (Foshan Metro)	Nanzhuang	Guangzhou South Railway Station	2021-12-28	32.4 km (20.1 mi)
	Line 3 (Foshan Metro)	Zhen'an	Shunde College Railway Station	2022-12-28	40.7 km (25.3 mi)
	Line 1 (Fuzhou Metro)	Xiangfeng	Sanchajie	2017-01-06	15.13 km (9.40 mi)
	Line 1 (Fuzhou Metro)	Sanchajie	Fuzhou South	2016-05-18	09.76 km (6.06 mi)
	Line 1 (Fuzhou Metro)	Fuzhou South	Sanjiangkou	2020-12-27	04.92 km (3.06 mi)
	Line 2 (Fuzhou Metro)	Suyang	Yangli	2019-04-26	30.62 km (19.03 mi)
	Line 5 (Fuzhou Metro)	Jingxi Houyu	Ancient Luozhou Town	2022-04-29	22.4 km (13.9 mi)
	Line 6 (Fuzhou Metro)	Pandun	Wanshou	2022-08-28	31.346 km (19.5 mi)
	Line 1 (Guangzhou Metro)	Xilang	Huangsha	1997-06-28	05.4 km (3.36 mi)
	Line 1 (Guangzhou Metro)	Huangsha	Guangzhou East Railway Station	1999-06-28	13.1 km (8.14 mi)
	Line 2 (Guangzhou Metro)	Guangzhou South Railway Station	Jiangnanxi	2010-09-25	12.7 km (7.89 mi)
	Line 2 (Guangzhou Metro)	Jiangnanxi	Sanyuanli	2002-12-29	07.4 km (4.60 mi)
	Line 2 (Guangzhou Metro)	Sanyuanli	Jiahewanggang	2010-09-25	10.3 km (6.40 mi)
	Line 3 (Guangzhou Metro)	Panyu Square	Kecun	2006-12-30	19.6 km (12.18 mi)
	Line 3 (Guangzhou Metro)	Kecun	Guangzhou East Railway Station	2005-12-26	07.8 km (4.85 mi)
	Line 3 (Guangzhou Metro)	Guangzhou East Railway Station	Airport South (Terminal 1)	2010-10-30	29.3 km (18.21 mi)
	Line 3 (Guangzhou Metro)	Airport South (Terminal 1)	Airport North (Terminal 2)	2018-04-26	1.23 km (0.76 mi)
	Line 3 (Guangzhou Metro)	Tiyu Xilu	Tianhe Coach Terminal	2006-12-30	07.5 km (4.66 mi)
	Line 4 (Guangzhou Metro)	Nansha Passenger Port	Jinzhou	2017-12-28	13.6 km (8.45 mi)
	Line 4 (Guangzhou Metro)	Jinzhou	Huangge	2007-06-28	05.1 km (3.17 mi)
	Line 4 (Guangzhou Metro)	Huangge	Xinzao	2006-12-30	22.3 km (13.86 mi)
	Line 4 (Guangzhou Metro)	Xinzao	Wanshengwei	2005-12-26	16.2 km (10.07 mi)
	Line 4 (Guangzhou Metro)	Wanshengwei	Chebeinan	2009-12-28	03.8 km (2.36 mi)
	Line 4 (Guangzhou Metro)	Chebeinan	Huangcun	2010-09-25	02.0 km (1.24 mi)
	Line 5 (Guangzhou Metro)	Jiaokou	Wenchong	2009-12-28	31.9 km (19.82 mi)
	Line 5 (Guangzhou Metro)	Wenchong	Huangpu New Port	2023-12-28	9.8 km (6.09 mi)
	Line 6 (Guangzhou Metro)	Xunfenggang	Changban	2013-12-28	24.5 km (15.22 mi)
	Line 6 (Guangzhou Metro)	Changban	Xiangxue	2016-12-28	17.2 km (10.69 mi)
	Line 7 (Guangzhou Metro)	Guangzhou South Railway Station	Higher Education Mega Center South	2016-12-28	18.6 km (11.56 mi)
	Line 7 (Guangzhou Metro)	Guangzhou South Railway Station	Meidi Dadao	2022-05-01	13.447 km (8.36 mi)
	Line 7 (Guangzhou Metro)	Higher Education Mega Center South	Yanshan	2023-12-28	22.2 km (13.79 mi)
	Line 8 (Guangzhou Metro)	Jiaoxin	Cultural Park	2020-11-26	16.3 km (10.13 mi)
	Line 8 (Guangzhou Metro)	Cultural Park	Fenghuang Xincun	2019-12-28	01.8 km (1.12 mi)
	Line 8 (Guangzhou Metro)	Fenghuang Xincun	Changgang	2010-11-03	04.4 km (2.73 mi)
	Line 8 (Guangzhou Metro)	Changgang	Xiaogang	2010-09-25	00.6 km (0.37 mi)
	Line 8 (Guangzhou Metro)	Xiaogang	Pazhou	2010-09-25 (Note: Line realignment, previously part of Line 2 since 28 June 2003 (2003-06-28).)	09.0 km (5.59 mi)
	Line 8 (Guangzhou Metro)	Pazhou	Wanshengwei	2010-09-25 (Note: Line realignment, previously part of Line 2 since 26 December 2005 (2005-12-26).)	01.8 km (1.12 mi)
	Line 9 (Guangzhou Metro)	Fei'eling	Gaozeng	2017-12-28	20.1 km (12.49 mi)
	Line 13 (Guangzhou Metro)	Yuzhu	Xinsha	2017-12-28	28.3 km (17.58 mi)
	Line 14 (Guangzhou Metro)	Jiahewanggang	Dongfeng	2018-12-28	54.3 km (33.74 mi)
	Line 14 (Guangzhou Metro)	Xinhe	Zhenlong	2017-12-28	21.4 km (13.30 mi)
	Line 18 (Guangzhou Metro)	Xiancun	Wanqingsha	2021-09-28	58.3 km (36.2 mi)
	Line 21 (Guangzhou Metro)	Zhenlongxi	Zengcheng Square	2018-12-28	26.2 km (16.28 mi)
	Line 21 (Guangzhou Metro)	Yuancun	Zhenlongxi	2019-12-20	35.3 km (21.93 mi)
	Line 22 (Guangzhou Metro)	Panyu Square	Chentougang	2022-03-31	18.2 km (11.3 mi)
	Zhujiang New Town APM line	Linhexi	Canton Tower	2010-11-08	04.0 km (2.49 mi)
	Guangfo line	Xincheng Dong	Kuiqi Lu	2016-12-28	06.7 km (4.16 mi)
	Guangfo line	Kuiqi Lu	Xilang	2010-09-25	20.4 km (12.68 mi)
	Guangfo line	Xilang	Yangang	2015-12-28	07.3 km (4.54 mi)
	Guangfo line	Yangang	Lijiao	2018-12-28	05.5 km (3.42 mi)
	Line 1 (Guiyang Metro)	Douguan	Xiamaixi	2019-12-28	2.05 km (1.27 mi)
	Line 1 (Guiyang Metro)	Xiamaixi	Guiyangbei Railway Station	2017-12-28	12.9 km (8.02 mi)
	Line 1 (Guiyang Metro)	Guiyangbei Railway Station	Xiaomeng Industrial Park	2018-12-01	20.23 km (12.57 mi)
	Line 2 (Guiyang Metro)	North Baiyun Road	Zhongxing Road	2021-04-28	40.6 km (25.23 mi)
	Line 3 (Guiyang Metro)	Luowan	Tongmuling	2023-12-16	43.0 km (26.72 mi)
	Line 1 (Hangzhou Metro)	Xianghu	Wenze Road	2012-11-24	34.77 km (21.61 mi)
	Line 1 (Hangzhou Metro)	Wenze Road	Xiasha Jiangbin	2015-11-24	05.7 km (3.54 mi)
	Line 1 (Hangzhou Metro)	Xiasha Jiangbin	Xiaoshan International Airport	2020-12-30	11.2 km (6.96 mi)
	Line 2 (Hangzhou Metro)	Chaoyang	Qianjiang Road	2014-11-24	18.3 km (11.37 mi)
	Line 2 (Hangzhou Metro)	Qianjiang Road	Gucui Road	2017-07-03	11.3 km (7.02 mi)
	Line 2 (Hangzhou Metro)	Gucui Road	Liangzhu	2017-12-27	13.3 km (8.26 mi)
	Line 3 (Hangzhou Metro)	Xingqiao	Chaowang Road	2022-02-21	21 km (13 mi)
	Line 3 (Hangzhou Metro)	Chaowang Road	West Wenyi Road	2022-06-10	22.4 km (13.9 mi)
	Line 3 (Hangzhou Metro)	South Xixi Wetland	Shima	2022-06-10	7.8 km (4.8 mi)
	Line 3 (Hangzhou Metro)	West Wenyi Road	Wushanqiancun	2022-09-22	7.2 km (4.5 mi)
	Line 4 (Hangzhou Metro)	Pengbu	Jinjiang	2015-02-02	09.6 km (5.97 mi)
	Line 4 (Hangzhou Metro)	Jinjiang	Puyan	2018-01-09	11.2 km (6.96 mi)
	Line 4 (Hangzhou Metro)	Pengbu	Chihua Street	2022-02-21	26 km (16.16 mi)
	Line 5 (Hangzhou Metro)	Jinxing	Liangmu Road	2020-04-23	6.52 km (4.05 mi)
	Line 5 (Hangzhou Metro)	Liangmu Road	Shanxian	2019-06-24	17.76 km (11.04 mi)
	Line 5 (Hangzhou Metro)	Shanxian	Guniangqiao	2020-04-23	30.86 km (19.18 mi)
	Line 6 (Hangzhou Metro)	Qianjiang Century City	Shuangpu	2020-12-30	27 km (17 mi)
	Line 6 (Hangzhou Metro)	Xiangshan Campus, China Academy of Art	West Guihua Road	2020-12-30	23.5 km (14.6 mi)
	Line 6 (Hangzhou Metro)	Qianjiang Century City	Goujulong	2021-11-06	8.4 km (5.2 mi)
	Line 7 (Hangzhou Metro)	Olympic Sports Center	Jiangdong'er Road	2020-12-30	39.3 km (24.42 mi)
	Line 7 (Hangzhou Metro)	Olympic Sports Center	Citizen Center	2021-09-17	3 km (1.86 mi)
	Line 7 (Hangzhou Metro)	Citizen Center	Wushan Square	2022-04-01	6 km (3.73 mi)
	Line 8 (Hangzhou Metro)	South Wenhai Road	Xinwan Road	2021-06-28	17.17 km (10.67 mi)
	Line 9 (Hangzhou Metro)	Coach Center	Linping	2021-07-10 (Note: Line realignment, previously part of Line 1 since 24 November 2012 (2012-11-24).)	12.5 km (7.8 mi)
	Line 9 (Hangzhou Metro)	Linping	Long'an	2021-09-17	6.2 km (3.9 mi)
	Line 9 (Hangzhou Metro)	Coach Center	Guanyintang	2022-04-01	12.0 km (7.5 mi)
	Line 10 (Hangzhou Metro)	Yisheng Road	Cuibai Road	2022-02-21	12 km (7.5 mi)
	Line 10 (Hangzhou Metro)	Cuibai Road	Xueyuan Road	2022-06-24	1 km (0.62 mi)
	Line 10 (Hangzhou Metro)	Xueyuan Road	Huanglong Sports Center	2022-09-22	2 km (1.2 mi)
	Line 16 (Hangzhou Metro)	Jiuzhou Street	Lvting Road	2020-04-23	35.12 km (21.82 mi)
	Line 19 (Hangzhou Metro)	West Railway Station	Yongsheng Road	2022-09-22	59.14 km (36.7 mi)
	Hanghai line	Linpingnan Railway Station	International Campus, ZJU	2021-06-28	48.18 km (29.94 mi)
	Line 1 (Harbin Metro)	Harbin East Railway Station	Harbin South Railway Station	2013-09-26	17.47 km (10.86 mi)
	Line 1 (Harbin Metro)	Harbin South Railway Station	Xinjiang Street	2019-04-10	8.58 km (5.33 mi)
	Line 2 (Harbin Metro)	Jiangbei University Town	Meteorological Observatory	2021-09-19	28.7 km (17.83 mi)
	Line 3 (Harbin Metro)	Harbin West Railway Station	The Second Affiliated Hospital of Harbin Medical University	2017-01-26	5.45 km (3.39 mi)
	Line 3 (Harbin Metro)	The Second Affiliated Hospital of Harbin Medical University	Taipingqiao	2021-11-26	19.19 km (11.92 mi)
	Line 3 (Harbin Metro)	Harbin West Railway Station	Sports Park	2021-11-26	19.19 km (11.92 mi)
	Line 3 (Harbin Metro)	Taipingqiao	Chinese-baroque Block	2023-09-29	3.4 km (2.11 mi)
	Line 3 (Harbin Metro)	Chinese-baroque Block	Beima Road	2023-12-26	1.0 km (0.62 mi)
	Line 1 (Hefei Metro)	Hefei Railway Station	Jiulianwei	2016-12-26	24.6 km (15.29 mi)
	Line 1 (Hefei Metro)	Zhangwa	Hefei Railway Station	2023-07-21	4.54 km (2.82 mi)
	Line 2 (Hefei Metro)	Nangang	Sanshibu	2017-12-26	27.8 km (17.27 mi)
	Line 2 (Hefei Metro)	Sanshibu	Cuozhen	2017-12-26	14.5 km (9.01 mi)
	Line 3 (Hefei Metro)	Xiangchenglu	Xingfuba	2019-12-26	37.2 km (23.12 mi)
	Line 3 (Hefei Metro)	Xingfuba	Sheng Ertong Yiyuan Xinqu	2023-12-26	11.3 km (7.02 mi)
	Line 4 (Hefei Metro)	Hefei Comprehensive Bonded Zone	Qinglonggang	2021-12-26	41.37 km (25.71 mi)
	Line 4 (Hefei Metro)	Beiyanhu	Shaomaigang	2024-05-01	13.97 km (8.68 mi)
	Line 5 (Hefei Metro)	Wanghuchengxi	Guiyang Lu	2020-12-26	25.2 km (15.66 mi)
	Line 5 (Hefei Metro)	Wanghuchengxi	Jiqiao Lu	2022-12-26	15.5 km (9.63 mi)
	Line 1 (Hohhot Metro)	Yili Health Valley	Bayan (Airport)	2019-12-29	21.719 km (13.5 mi)
	Line 2 (Hohhot Metro)	Talidonglu	A'ershanlu	2020-10-01	27.32 km (17.0 mi)
	Line 1 (Jinan Metro)	Fangte	Gongyanyuan	2019-04-01	26.1 km (16.22 mi)
	Line 2 (Jinan Metro)	Wangfuzhuang	Pengjiazhuang	2021-03-26	36.39 km (22.61 mi)
	Line 3 (Jinan Metro)	Longdong	Tantou	2019-12-28	21.592 km (13.42 mi)
	Jinyi Line (Jinhua Rail Transit)	Jinhua Railway Station	Qintang	2022-08-30	58.071 km (36.084 mi)
	Yidong Line (Jinhua Rail Transit)	Lingyun	Sports Center	2022-12-28	26.8 km (16.7 mi)
	Line 1 (Kunming Metro)	South Ring Road	Xiaodongcun	2014-04-30	06.9 km (4.29 mi)
	Line 1 (Kunming Metro)	Xiaodongcun	University Town (South)	2013-05-20	22.1 km (13.73 mi)
	Line 1 (Kunming Metro)	Chunrong Street	Kunming South Railway Station	2016-12-26	04.7 km (2.92 mi)
	Line 2 (Kunming Metro)	North Coach Station	South Ring Road	2014-04-30	11.4 km (7.08 mi)
	Line 3 (Kunming Metro)	Western Hills Park	East Coach Station	2017-08-29	23.36 km (14.52 mi)
	Line 4 (Kunming Metro)	Jinchuan Road	Kunming South Railway Station	2020-09-23	43.4 km (27.0 mi)
	Line 5 (Kunming Metro)	World Horti-Expo Garden	Baofeng	2022-06-29	26.45 km (16.44 mi)
	Line 6 (Kunming Metro)	East Coach Station	Kunming Airport	2012-06-28	18.018 km (11.196 mi)
	Line 6 (Kunming Metro)	Tangzixiang	East Coach Station	2020-09-23	7.3 km (4.5 mi)
	Line 1 (Lanzhou Metro)	Chenguanying	Donggang	2019-06-23	25.9 km (16.09 mi)
	Line 2 (Lanzhou Metro)	Dongfanghong Square	Yanbai Bridge	2023-06-29	9.1 km (5.65 mi)
	Line 1 (Luoyang Subway)	Hongshan	Yangwan	2021-03-28	25.3 km (15.72 mi)
	Line 2 (Luoyang Subway)	Erqiao Road	Balitang	2021-12-26	18.2 km (11.31 mi)
Barra	Oceano	2023-12-08	3.2 km (1.99 mi)		
	Line 1 (Nanchang Metro)	Shuanggang	Yaohu Lake West	2015-12-26	28.737 km (17.86 mi)
	Line 2 (Nanchang Metro)	Xinjia'an	Metro Central	2019-06-30	11.88 km (7.38 mi)
	Line 2 (Nanchang Metro)	Metro Central	Nanlu	2017-08-18	19.63 km (12.20 mi)
	Line 3 (Nanchang Metro)	Yinsanjiao North	Jingdong Avenue	2020-12-26	28.5 km (17.71 mi)
	Line 4 (Nanchang Metro)	Yuweizhou	Baimashan	2021-12-26	39.6 km (24.6 mi)
	Line 1 (Nanjing Metro)	Baguazhoudaqiaonan	Maigaoqiao	2022-12-28	6.53 km (4.06 mi)
	Line 1 (Nanjing Metro)	Maigaoqiao	Andemen	2005-09-03	21.72 km (13.50 mi)
	Line 1 (Nanjing Metro)	Andemen	CPU	2010-05-28	25.08 km (15.58 mi)
	Line 2 (Nanjing Metro)	Youfangqiao	Jingtianlu	2010-05-28	37.95 km (23.58 mi)
	Line 2 (Nanjing Metro)	Youfangqiao	Yuzui	2021-12-28	5.4 km (3.4 mi)
	Line 3 (Nanjing Metro)	Linchang	Mozhoudonglu	2015-04-01	44.9 km (27.90 mi)
	Line 4 (Nanjing Metro)	Longjiang	Xianlinhu	2017-01-18	33.5 km (20.82 mi)
	Line 5 (Nanjing Metro)	Wenjinglu	Jiyindadao	2024-03-31	12.9 km (8.02 mi)
	Line 7 (Nanjing Metro)	Xianxinlu	Mufuxilu	2022-12-28	13.8 km (8.57 mi)
	Line 7 (Nanjing Metro)	Yingtiandajie	Xishanqiao	2023-12-28	10.7 km (6.65 mi)
	Line 10 (Nanjing Metro)	Andemen	Xiaohang	2005-08-27	02.1 km (1.30 mi)
	Line 10 (Nanjing Metro)	Xiaohang	Olympic Stadium	2014-07-01	04.6 km (2.86 mi)
	Line 10 (Nanjing Metro)	Olympic Stadium	Yushanlu	2014-07-01	14.9 km (9.26 mi)
	Line S1 (Nanjing Metro)	Nanjing South Railway Station	Lukou International Airport	2014-07-01	35.8 km (22.25 mi)
	Line S1 (Nanjing Metro)	Lukou International Airport	Konggangxinchengjiangning	2018-05-26	1.5 km (0.93 mi)
	Line S3 (Nanjing Metro)	Nanjing South Railway Station	Gaojiachong	2017-12-06	37.6 km (23.36 mi)
	Line S4 (Nanjing Metro)	Chahe	Chuzhou Railway Station	2023-06-28	44.0 km (27.34 mi)
	Line S6 (Nanjing Metro)	Maqun	Jurong	2021-12-28	43.64 km (27.12 mi)
	Line S7 (Nanjing Metro)	Konggangxinchengjiangning	Wuxiangshan	2018-05-26	30.4 km (18.89 mi)
	Line S8 (Nanjing Metro)	Taishanxincun	Jinniuhu	2014-08-01	45.2 km (28.09 mi)
	Line S8 (Nanjing Metro)	Taishanxincun	Changjiangdaqiaobei	2022-09-30	02.1 km (1.30 mi)
	Line S9 (Nanjing Metro)	Xiangyulunan	Gaochun	2017-12-30	52.4 km (32.56 mi)
	Line 1 (Nanning Metro)	Shibu	Nanhu	2016-12-28	20.9 km (12.99 mi)
	Line 1 (Nanning Metro)	Nanhu	Nanning East Railway Station	2016-06-28	11.2 km (6.96 mi)
	Line 2 (Nanning Metro)	Xijin	Yudong	2017-12-28	21.2 km (13.17 mi)
	Line 2 (Nanning Metro)	Yudong	Tanze	2020-11-23	6.3 km (3.91 mi)
	Line 3 (Nanning Metro)	Keyuan Dadao	Pingliang Overpass	2019-06-06	27.9 km (17.34 mi)
	Line 4 (Nanning Metro)	Hongyun Lu	Lengtangcun	2020-11-23	20.7 km (12.86 mi)
	Line 5 (Nanning Metro)	Guokai Dadao	Jinqiao Coach Station	2021-12-16	20.2 km (12.55 mi)
	Line 1 (Nantong Rail Transit)	Pingchao	Zhenxing Lu	2022-11-10	39.182 km (24.35 mi)
	Line 2 (Nantong Rail Transit)	Xingfu	Xianfeng	2023-12-27	20.85 km (12.96 mi)
	Line 1 (Ningbo Rail Transit)	Gaoqiao West	Donghuan South Road	2014-05-30	20.8 km (12.92 mi)
	Line 1 (Ningbo Rail Transit)	Donghuan South Road	Xiapu	2016-03-19	25.3 km (15.72 mi)
	Line 2 (Ningbo Rail Transit)	Lishe International Airport	Qingshuipu	2015-09-26	28.4 km (17.65 mi)
	Line 2 (Ningbo Rail Transit)	Qingshuipu	Congyuan Road	2020-05-30	5.6 km (3.48 mi)
	Line 2 (Ningbo Rail Transit)	Congyuan Road	Honglian	2022-12-01	2.9 km (1.80 mi)
	Line 3 (Ningbo Rail Transit)	Datong Bridge	Gaotang Bridge	2019-06-30	16.73 km (10.40 mi)
	Line 3 (Ningbo Rail Transit)	Gaotang Bridge	Minghui Road	2019-09-28	5.61 km (3.49 mi)
	Line 3 (Ningbo Rail Transit)	Minghui Road	Jinhai Road	2020-09-27	15.92 km (9.89 mi)
	Line 4 (Ningbo Rail Transit)	Cicheng	Dongqian Lake	2020-12-23	36.5 km (22.68 mi)
	Line 5 (Ningbo Rail Transit)	Buzheng	Xingzhuang Road	2021-12-28	27.9 km (17.34 mi)
	Line 1 (Qingdao Metro)	Dongguozhuang	Qingdao North Railway Station	2020-12-24	21.9 km (13.6 mi)
	Line 1 (Qingdao Metro)	Qingdao North Railway Station	Wangjiagang	2021-12-30	38 km (24 mi)
	Line 2 (Qingdao Metro)	Taishan Road	Zhiquan Road	2019-12-16	4.2 km (2.61 mi)
	Line 2 (Qingdao Metro)	Zhiquan Road	Licun Park	2017-12-10	20.422 km (12.69 mi)
	Line 3 (Qingdao Metro)	Qingdao North Railway Station	Shuangshan	2015-12-16	12.0 km (7.46 mi)
	Line 3 (Qingdao Metro)	Shuangshan	Qingdao Railway Station	2016-12-18	12.8 km (7.95 mi)
	Line 4 (Qingdao Metro)	Hall of the People	Dahedong	2022-12-26	30.7 km (19.1 mi)
	Line 6 (Qingdao Metro)	Hengyunshan Road	Lingshan Bay	2024-04-26	30.762 km (19.115 mi)
	Line 8 (Qingdao Metro)	Jiaozhou North Railway Station	Qingdao North Railway Station	2020-12-24	48.3 km (30.0 mi)
	Oceantec Valley Line	Miaoling Road	Qiangu Mountain	2018-04-23	54.4 km (33.80 mi)
	West Coast Line (Qingdao Metro)	Jinggangshan Road	Dongjiakou Railway Station	2018-12-26	66.813 km (41.52 mi)
	West Coast Line (Qingdao Metro)	Jinggangshan Road	Jialingjiang West Road	2023-10-26	2.8 km (1.74 mi)
	Line 1 (Shanghai Metro)	Xinzhuang	Shanghai South Railway Station	1996-12-28	05.3 km (3.29 mi)
	Line 1 (Shanghai Metro)	Shanghai South Railway Station	Xujiahui	1993-05-28	04.4 km (2.73 mi)
	Line 1 (Shanghai Metro)	Xujiahui	Shanghai Railway Station	1995-04-10	16.1 km (10.00 mi)
	Line 1 (Shanghai Metro)	Shanghai Railway Station	Gongfu Xincun	2004-12-28	12.4 km (7.71 mi)
	Line 1 (Shanghai Metro)	Gongfu Xincun	Fujin Road	2007-12-29	04.3 km (2.67 mi)
	Line 2 (Shanghai Metro)	East Xujing	Songhong Road	2010-03-16	08.6 km (5.34 mi)
	Line 2 (Shanghai Metro)	Songhong Road	Zhongshan Park	2006-12-30	06.8 km (4.23 mi)
	Line 2 (Shanghai Metro)	Zhongshan Park	Longyang Road	2000-06-11	16.4 km (10.19 mi)
	Line 2 (Shanghai Metro)	Longyang Road	Zhangjiang Hi-Tech Park	2000-12-26	02.8 km (1.74 mi)
	Line 2 (Shanghai Metro)	Zhangjiang Hi-Tech Park	Guanglan Road	2010-02-24	03.4 km (2.11 mi)
	Line 2 (Shanghai Metro)	Guanglan Road	Pudong International Airport	2010-04-08	26.8 km (16.65 mi)
	Line 2 (Shanghai Metro)	Panxiang Road · Shanghai National Accounting Institute	National Exhibition and Convention Center	2025-11-01	1.67 km (1.04 mi)
	Line 3 (Shanghai Metro)	Shanghai South Railway Station	Jiangwan Town	2000-12-26	24.6 km (15.29 mi)
	Line 3 (Shanghai Metro)	Jiangwan Town	North Jiangyang Road	2006-12-18	15.7 km (9.76 mi)
	Line 4 (Shanghai Metro)	Damuqiao Road	Lancun Road	2005-12-31	25.0 km (15.53 mi)
	Line 4 (Shanghai Metro)	Lancun Road	Damuqiao Road	2007-12-29	08.7 km (5.41 mi)
	Line 5 (Shanghai Metro)	Xinzhuang	Minhang Development Zone	2003-11-25	17.2 km (10.69 mi)
	Line 5 (Shanghai Metro)	Dongchuan Road	Fengxian Xincheng	2018-12-30	19.5 km (12.12 mi)
	Line 6 (Shanghai Metro)	Gangcheng Road	South Lingyan Road	2007-12-29	31.1 km (19.32 mi)
	Line 6 (Shanghai Metro)	South Lingyan Road	Oriental Sports Center	2011-04-12	01.2 km (0.75 mi)
	Line 7 (Shanghai Metro)	Meilan Lake	Shanghai University	2010-12-28	09.8 km (6.09 mi)
	Line 7 (Shanghai Metro)	Shanghai University	Huamu Road	2009-12-05	34.4 km (21.38 mi)
	Line 8 (Shanghai Metro)	Shiguang Road	Yaohua Road	2007-12-29	23.3 km (14.48 mi)
	Line 8 (Shanghai Metro)	Yaohua Road	Shendu Highway	2009-07-05	14.1 km (8.76 mi)
	Line 9 (Shanghai Metro)	Shanghai Songjiang Railway Station	Songjiang Xincheng	2012-12-30	06.474 km (4.02 mi)
	Line 9 (Shanghai Metro)	Songjiang Xincheng	Guilin Road	2007-12-29	29.013 km (18.03 mi)
	Line 9 (Shanghai Metro)	Guilin Road	Yishan Road	2008-12-28	01.687 km (1.05 mi)
	Line 9 (Shanghai Metro)	Yishan Road	Century Avenue	2009-12-31	11.491 km (7.14 mi)
	Line 9 (Shanghai Metro)	Century Avenue	Middle Yanggao Road	2010-04-07	02.435 km (1.51 mi)
	Line 9 (Shanghai Metro)	Middle Yanggao Road	Caolu	2017-12-30	14.099 km (8.76 mi)
	Line 10 (Shanghai Metro)	Hangzhong Road	Xinjiangwancheng	2010-04-10	29.6 km (18.39 mi)
	Line 10 (Shanghai Metro)	Hongqiao Railway Station	Longxi Road	2010-11-30	05.8 km (3.60 mi)
	Line 10 (Shanghai Metro)	Xinjiangwancheng	Jilong Road	2020-12-26	09.8 km (6.09 mi)
	Line 11 (Shanghai Metro)	Disney Resort	Kangxin Highway	2016-04-26	01.8 km (1.12 mi)
	Line 11 (Shanghai Metro)	Kangxin Highway	Luoshan Road	2015-12-19	10.4 km (6.46 mi)
	Line 11 (Shanghai Metro)	Luoshan Road	Jiangsu Road	2013-08-31	19.2 km (11.93 mi)
	Line 11 (Shanghai Metro)	Jiangsu Road	North Jiading	2009-12-31	33.0 km (20.51 mi)
	Line 11 (Shanghai Metro)	Jiading Xincheng	Anting	2010-03-29	12.8 km (7.95 mi)
	Line 11 (Shanghai Metro)	Anting	Huaqiao	2013-10-16	07.0 km (4.35 mi)
	Line 12 (Shanghai Metro)	Qixin Road	Qufu Road	2015-12-19	21.8 km (13.55 mi)
	Line 12 (Shanghai Metro)	Qufu Road	Tiantong Road	2014-05-10	01.1 km (0.68 mi)
	Line 12 (Shanghai Metro)	Tiantong Road	Jinhai Road	2013-12-29	17.5 km (10.87 mi)
	Line 13 (Shanghai Metro)	Jinyun Road	Jinshajiang Road	2012-12-30	09.9 km (6.15 mi)
	Line 13 (Shanghai Metro)	Jinshajiang Road	Changshou Road	2014-12-28	02.9 km (1.80 mi)
	Line 13 (Shanghai Metro)	Changshou Road	Madang Road	2015-12-19	05.4 km (3.36 mi)
	Line 13 (Shanghai Metro)	Madang Road	Shibo Avenue	2010-04-20	04.0 km (2.49 mi)
	Line 13 (Shanghai Metro)	Shibo Avenue	Zhangjiang Road	2018-12-30	16.1 km (10.00 mi)
	Line 14 (Shanghai Metro)	Fengbang	Guiqiao Road	2021-12-30	38.18 km (23.72 mi)
	Line 15 (Shanghai Metro)	Gucun Park	Zizhu Hi-tech Zone	2021-01-23	42.3 km (26.28 mi)
	Line 16 (Shanghai Metro)	Longyang Road	Luoshan Road	2014-12-28	06.112 km (3.80 mi)
	Line 16 (Shanghai Metro)	Luoshan Road	Dishui Lake	2013-12-29	52.850 km (32.84 mi)
	Line 17 (Shanghai Metro)	Hongqiao Railway Station	Oriental Land	2017-12-30	35.3 km (21.93 mi)
	Line 18 (Shanghai Metro)	Yuqiao	South Changjiang Road	2021-12-30	21.45 km (13.33 mi)
	Line 18 (Shanghai Metro)	Hangtou	Yuqiao	2020-12-26	14.5 km (9.01 mi)
	Pujiang line	Shendu Highway	Huizhen Road	2018-03-31	06.6 km (4.10 mi)
	Maglev line	Longyang Road	Pudong International Airport	2004-01-01	30.5 km (18.95 mi)
	Line 1 (Shaoxing Metro)	Guniangqiao	China Textile City	2021-06-28	20.3 km (12.6 mi)
	Line 1 (Shaoxing Metro)	China Textile City	Fangquan	2022-04-29	26.8 km (16.7 mi)
	Line 1 (Shaoxing Metro)	Huangjiu Town	Daqingsi	2024-04-01	4.1 km (2.5 mi)
	Line 2 (Shaoxing Metro)	Jinghu Hospital	Tandu	2023-07-26	10.73 km (6.67 mi)
	Line 1 (Shenyang Metro)	Shisanhaojie	Limingguangchang	2010-09-27	27.8 km (17.27 mi)
	Line 2 (Shenyang Metro)	Putianlu	Hangkonghangtiandaxue	2018-04-08	05.7 km (3.54 mi)
	Line 2 (Shenyang Metro)	Hangkonghangtiandaxue	Santaizi	2013-12-30	05.6 km (3.48 mi)
	Line 2 (Shenyang Metro)	Santaizi	Quanyunlu	2012-01-09	21.76 km (13.52 mi)
	Line 2 (Shenyang Metro)	Quanyunlu	Taoxianjichang	2023-09-29	13.7 km (8.51 mi)
	Line 4 (Shenyang Metro)	Zhengxinlu	Chuangxinlu	2023-09-29	34.112 km (21.20 mi)
	Line 9 (Shenyang Metro)	Nujianggongyuan	Jianzhudaxue	2019-05-25	28.996 km (18.02 mi)
	Line 10 (Shenyang Metro)	Dingxianghu	Zhangshabu	2020-04-29	27.21 km (16.91 mi)
	Line 1 (Shenzhen Metro)	Luohu	Window of the World	2004-12-28	17.387 km (10.80 mi)
	Line 1 (Shenzhen Metro)	Window of the World	Shenzhen University	2009-09-28	03.400 km (2.11 mi)
	Line 1 (Shenzhen Metro)	Shenzhen University	Airport East	2011-06-15	20.222 km (12.57 mi)
	Line 2 (Shenzhen Metro)	Chiwan	Window of the World	2010-12-28	15.514 km (9.64 mi)
	Line 2 (Shenzhen Metro)	Window of the World	Xinxiu	2011-06-28	20.266 km (12.59 mi)
	Line 2 (Shenzhen Metro)	Xinxiu	Liantang	2020-10-28	3.82 km (2.37 mi)
	Line 3 (Shenzhen Metro)	Yitian	Caopu	2011-06-28	16.522 km (10.27 mi)
	Line 3 (Shenzhen Metro)	Caopu	Shuanglong	2010-12-28	25.138 km (15.62 mi)
	Line 3 (Shenzhen Metro)	Yitian	Futian Bonded Area	2020-10-28	1.5 km (0.93 mi)
	Line 4 (Shenzhen Metro)	Futian Checkpoint	Fumin	2007-06-28	01.100 km (0.68 mi)
	Line 4 (Shenzhen Metro)	Fumin	Children's Palace	2004-12-28	03.379 km (2.10 mi)
	Line 4 (Shenzhen Metro)	Children's Palace	Qinghu	2011-06-16	15.481 km (9.62 mi)
	Line 4 (Shenzhen Metro)	Qinghu	Niuhu	2020-10-28	10.791 km (6.71 mi)
	Line 5 (Shenzhen Metro)	Chiwan	Qianhaiwan	2019-09-28	7.65 km (4.75 mi)
	Line 5 (Shenzhen Metro)	Qianhaiwan	Huangbeiling	2011-06-22	40.00 km (24.85 mi)
	Line 6 (Shenzhen Metro)	Science Museum	Songgang	2020-08-18	49.4 km (30.7 mi)
	Line 6 Branch (Shenzhen Metro)	SIAT	Guangming	2022-11-28	6.13 km (3.81 mi)
	Line 7 (Shenzhen Metro)	Xili Lake	Tai'an	2016-10-28	30.173 km (18.75 mi)
	Line 8 (Shenzhen Metro)	Liantang	Yantian Road	2020-10-28	12.367 km (7.7 mi)
	Line 8 (Shenzhen Metro)	Yantian Road	Xiaomeisha	2023-12-27	8.01 km (5.0 mi)
	Line 9 (Shenzhen Metro)	Qianwan	Hongshuwan South	2019-12-08	10.79 km (6.70 mi)
	Line 9 (Shenzhen Metro)	Hongshuwan South	Wenjin	2016-10-28	25.39 km (15.78 mi)
	Line 10 (Shenzhen Metro)	Shuangyong Street	Futian Checkpoint	2020-08-18	29.3 km (18.2 mi)
	Line 11 (Shenzhen Metro)	Bitou	Futian	2016-06-28	51.94 km (32.27 mi)
	Line 11 (Shenzhen Metro)	Futian	Gangxia North	2022-10-28	1.6 km (0.99 mi)
	Line 12 (Shenzhen Metro)	Zuopaotai East	Waterlands Resort East	2022-11-28	40.56 km (25.20 mi)
	Line 14 (Shenzhen Metro)	Gangxia North	Shatian	2022-10-28	50.34 km (31.28 mi)
	Line 16 (Shenzhen Metro)	Universiade	Tianxin	2022-12-28	29.20 km (18.14 mi)
	Line 20 (Shenzhen Metro)	Convention & Exhibition City	Airport North	2021-12-28	08.43 km (5.24 mi)
	Line 1 (Shijiazhuang Metro)	Xiwang	Xiaohedadao	2017-06-26	23.9 km (14.9 mi)
	Line 1 (Shijiazhuang Metro)	Xiaohedadao	Fuze	2019-06-26	10.4 km (6.5 mi)
	Line 2 (Shijiazhuang Metro)	Liuxinzhuang	Jiahualu	2020-08-26	15.5 km (9.6 mi)
	Line 3 (Shijiazhuang Metro)	Xisanzhuang	Shierzhong	2020-01-20	05.4 km (3.4 mi)
	Line 3 (Shijiazhuang Metro)	Shierzhong	Shijiazhuangzhan	2017-06-26	06.4 km (4.0 mi)
	Line 3 (Shijiazhuang Metro)	Shijiazhuangzhan	Lexiang	2021-04-06	14.9 km (9.3 mi)
	Line 1 (Suzhou Metro)	Mudu	Zhongnan Jie	2012-04-28	25.739 km (15.99 mi)
	Line 2 (Suzhou Metro)	Qihe	Suzhoubei Railway Station	2016-09-24	02.2 km (1.37 mi)
	Line 2 (Suzhou Metro)	Suzhoubei Railway Station	Baodaiqiao South	2013-12-28	26.557 km (16.50 mi)
	Line 2 (Suzhou Metro)	Baodaiqiao South	Sangtian Dao	2016-09-24	11.643 km (7.23 mi)
	Line 3 (Suzhou Metro)	Suzhou Xinqu Railway Station	Weiting	2019-12-25	45.272 km (28.1 mi)
	Line 4 (Suzhou Metro)	Longdaobang	Tongli	2017-04-15	41.5 km (25.79 mi)
	Line 4 (Suzhou Metro)	Hongzhuang	Muli	2017-04-15	11.3 km (7.02 mi)
	Line 5 (Suzhou Metro)	Taihu Xiangshan	Yangchenghu South	2021-06-29	44.1 km (27.4 mi)
	Line 11 (Suzhou Metro)	Weiting	Huaqiao	2023-06-24	41.27 km (25.6 mi)
	Line 2 (Taiyuan Metro)	Jiancaoping	Xiqiao	2020-12-26	23.65 km (14.70 mi)
	Line S1 (Taizhou Rail Transit)	Taizhou Huochezhan	Chengnan	2022-12-28	52.568 km (32.66 mi)
	Line 1 (Tianjin Metro)	Donggulu	Lilou	2019-12-28	16.039 km (9.97 mi)
	Line 1 (Tianjin Metro)	Lilou	Shuanglin	2018-12-03	16.039 km (9.97 mi)
	Line 1 (Tianjin Metro)	Shuanglin	Xiaobailou	2006-06-12	10.6 km (6.59 mi)
	Line 1 (Tianjin Metro)	Xiaobailou	Xi'nanjiao	1980-08-10	05.2 km (3.23 mi)
	Line 1 (Tianjin Metro)	Xi'nanjiao	Xizhan	1984-12-28	02.2 km (1.37 mi)
	Line 1 (Tianjin Metro)	Xizhan	Liuyuan	2006-06-12	08.2 km (5.10 mi)
	Line 2 (Tianjin Metro)	Caozhuang	Dongnanjiao	2012-07-01	09.1 km (5.65 mi)
	Line 2 (Tianjin Metro)	Dongnanjiao	Tianjinzhan	2013-08-28	01.95 km (1.21 mi)
	Line 2 (Tianjin Metro)	Tianjinzhan	Konggangjingjiqu	2012-07-01	11.6 km (7.21 mi)
	Line 2 (Tianjin Metro)	Konggangjingjiqu	Binhaiguojijichang	2014-08-28	04.5 km (2.80 mi)
	Line 3 (Tianjin Metro)	Nanzhan	Gaoxinqu	2013-12-28	01.1 km (0.68 mi)
	Line 3 (Tianjin Metro)	Gaoxinqu	Xiaodian	2012-10-01	29.655 km (18.43 mi)
	Line 4 (Tianjin Metro)	Dongnanjiao	Xinxingcun	2021-12-28	19.4 km (12.1 mi)
	Line 4 (Tianjin Metro)	Xiaojie	Xizhan	2025-07-08	19.85 km (12.33 mi)
	Line 5 (Tianjin Metro)	Beichenkejiyuanbei	Danhebeidao	2019-01-31	34.8 km (21.6 mi)
	Line 5 (Tianjin Metro)	Danhebeidao	Zhongyiyifuyuan	2018-10-22	34.8 km (21.6 mi)
	Line 5 (Tianjin Metro)	Zhongyiyifuyuan	Liqizhuangnan	2021-12-07	34.8 km (21.6 mi)
	Line 6 (Tianjin Metro)	Nansunzhuang	Changhonggongyuan	2016-12-31	14.5 km (9.01 mi)
	Line 6 (Tianjin Metro)	Changhonggongyuan	Nancuiping	2016-08-06	09.5 km (5.90 mi)
	Line 6 (Tianjin Metro)	Nancuiping	Meilinlu	2018-04-26	13.0 km (8.08 mi)
	Line 6 (Tianjin Metro)	Meilinlu	Lushuidao	2021-12-28	0.97 km (0.60 mi)
	Line 8 (Tianjin Metro)	Lushuidao	Xianshuiguxi	2021-12-28	13.42 km (8.34 mi)
	Line 9 (Tianjin Metro)	Tianjinzhan	Shiyijinglu	2012-10-15	1.2 km (0.75 mi)
	Line 9 (Tianjin Metro)	Shiyijinglu	Zhongshanmen	2011-05-01	06.151 km (3.82 mi)
	Line 9 (Tianjin Metro)	Zhongshanmen	Donghailu	2004-03-28	45.409 km (28.22 mi)
	Line 10 (Tianjin Metro)	Yutai	Yudongcheng	2022-11-18	21.18 km (13.16 mi)
	Line 11 (Tianjin Metro)	Dongjiangdao	Dongliliujinglu	2023-12-28	12.27 km (7.62 mi)
	Line 1 (Ürümqi Metro)	International Airport	Balou	2018-10-25	16.5 km (10.25 mi)
	Line 1 (Ürümqi Metro)	Balou	Santunbei	2019-06-28	11.1 km (6.90 mi)
	Line S1 (Wenzhou Rail Transit)	Tongling	Olympic Center	2019-01-23	34.38 km (21.36 mi)
	Line S1 (Wenzhou Rail Transit)	Olympic Center	Shuang'ou Avenue	2019-09-28	19.127 km (11.9 mi)
	Line 1 (Wuhan Metro)	Hankou North	Dijiao	2014-05-28	05.555 km (3.45 mi)
	Line 1 (Wuhan Metro)	Dijiao	Huangpu Road	2010-07-29	07.040 km (4.37 mi)
	Line 1 (Wuhan Metro)	Huangpu Road	Zongguan	2004-07-28	09.769 km (6.07 mi)
	Line 1 (Wuhan Metro)	Zongguan	Dongwu Boulevard	2010-07-29	11.454 km (7.12 mi)
	Line 1 (Wuhan Metro)	Dongwu Boulevard	Jinghe	2017-12-26	03.970 km (2.47 mi)
	Line 2 (Wuhan Metro)	Tianhe International Airport	Jinyintan	2016-12-28	19.957 km (12.40 mi)
	Line 2 (Wuhan Metro)	Jinyintan	Optics Valley Square	2012-12-28	27.152 km (16.87 mi)
	Line 2 (Wuhan Metro)	Optics Valley Square	Fozuling	2019-02-19	13.350 km (8.30 mi)
	Line 3 (Wuhan Metro)	Hongtu Boulevard	Zhuanyang Boulevard	2015-12-28	29.660 km (18.43 mi)
	Line 4 (Wuhan Metro)	Wuhan Railway Station	Wuchang Railway Station	2013-12-28	17.974 km (11.17 mi)
	Line 4 (Wuhan Metro)	Wuchang Railway Station	Huangjinkou	2014-12-28	15.429 km (9.59 mi)
	Line 4 (Wuhan Metro)	Huangjinkou	Bailin	2019-09-25	16.068 km (9.98 mi)
	Line 5 (Wuhan Metro)	East Square of Wuhan Railway Station	Hubei University of Chinese Medicine	2021-12-26	34.561 km (21.48 mi)
	Line 5 (Wuhan Metro)	Hubei University of Chinese Medicine	Hongxia	2023-12-01	2.655 km (1.65 mi)
	Line 6 (Wuhan Metro)	Jinyinhu Park	Dongfeng Motor Corporation	2016-12-28	35.512 km (22.07 mi)
	Line 6 (Wuhan Metro)	Jinyinhu Park	Xincheng 11th Road	2021-12-26	7.025 km (4.37 mi)
	Line 7 (Wuhan Metro)	Garden Expo North	Yezhihu	2018-10-01	30.413 km (18.90 mi)
	Line 7 (Wuhan Metro)	Yezhihu	Qinglongshan Ditiexiaozhen	2018-12-28	16.97 km (10.54 mi)
	Line 7 (Wuhan Metro)	Garden Expo North	Hengdian	2022-12-30	21.12 km (13.12 mi)
	Line 8 (Wuhan Metro)	Jintan Road	Liyuan	2017-12-26	16.7 km (10.38 mi)
	Line 8 (Wuhan Metro)	Liyuan	Yezhihu	2021-01-02	17.6 km (10.94 mi)
	Line 8 (Wuhan Metro)	Yezhihu	Military Athletes' Village	2019-11-06	4.84 km (3.01 mi)
	Line 11 (Wuhan Metro)	Wuhandong Railway Station	Zuoling	2018-10-01	18.744 km (11.65 mi)
	Line 11 (Wuhan Metro)	Zuoling	Gediannan Railway Station	2021-01-02	3.7 km (2.30 mi)
	Line 16 (Wuhan Metro)	South International Expo Center	Zhoujiahe	2021-12-26	31.692 km (19.69 mi)
	Line 16 (Wuhan Metro)	Zhoujiahe	Hannan General Airport	2022-12-30	4.22 km (2.62 mi)
	Line 19 (Wuhan Metro)	West Square of Wuhan Railway Station	Xinyuexi Park	2023-12-30	23.3 km (14.48 mi)
	Yangluo line	Houhu Boulevard	Jintai	2017-12-27	34.5 km (21.44 mi)
	Line 1 (Wuhu Rail Transit)	Baoshunlu	Baimashan	2021-11-03	30.4 km (18.9 mi)
	Line 2 (Wuhu Rail Transit)	Wanchunhulu	Jiuziguangchang	2021-12-28	15.8 km (9.8 mi)
	Line 1 (Wuxi Metro)	Yanqiao	Changguangxi	2014-07-01	29.42 km (18.28 mi)
	Line 1 (Wuxi Metro)	Changguangxi	Nanfangquan	2019-09-28	5.187 km (3.22 mi)
	Line 1 (Wuxi Metro)	Yanqiao	Jiangyin Bund	2024-01-31	30.4 km (18.89 mi)
	Line 2 (Wuxi Metro)	Meiyuan Kaiyuan Temple	Wuxi East Railway Station	2014-12-28	26.3 km (16.34 mi)
	Line 3 (Wuxi Metro)	Sumiao	Sunan Shuofang International Airport	2020-10-28	28.493 km (17.70 mi)
	Line 4 (Wuxi Metro)	Liutan	Wuxi Taihu International Expo Center	2021-12-17	25.4 km (15.8 mi)
	Line 1 (Xi'an Metro)	Houweizhai	Fangzhicheng	2013-09-15	25.36 km (15.76 mi)
	Line 1 (Xi'an Metro)	Fenghesenlingongyuan	Houweizhai	2019-09-26	6.093 km (3.79 mi)
	Line 1 (Xi'an Metro)	Fenghesenlingongyuan	Xianyangxizhan	2023-09-21	10.6 km (6.59 mi)
	Line 2 (Xi'an Metro)	Caotan	Xi'an Beizhan	2023-06-27	3.505 km (2.178 mi)
	Line 2 (Xi'an Metro)	Xi'an Beizhan	Dianshita	2011-09-16	26.715 km (16.60 mi)
	Line 2 (Xi'an Metro)	Dianshita	Weiqunan	2014-06-16	26.715 km (16.60 mi)
	Line 2 (Xi'an Metro)	Weiqunan	Changninggong	2023-06-27	3.417 km (2.123 mi)
	Line 3 (Xi'an Metro)	Yuhuazhai	Baoshuiqu	2016-11-08	39.1 km (24.30 mi)
	Line 4 (Xi'an Metro)	Xi'an Beizhan	Hangtian Xincheng	2018-12-26	35.2 km (21.87 mi)
	Line 5 (Xi'an Metro)	Chuangxingang	Matengkong	2020-12-28	41.6 km (25.85 mi)
	Line 6 (Xi'an Metro)	Xi'anguojiyixuezhongxin	Xibeigongyedaxue	2020-12-28	15.6 km (9.69 mi)
	Line 6 (Xi'an Metro)	Xibeigongyedaxue	Fangzhicheng	2022-12-29	19.5 km (12.12 mi)
	Line 9 (Xi'an Metro)	Fangzhicheng	Qinlingxi	2020-12-28	25.3 km (15.72 mi)
	Line 14 (Xi'an Metro)	Airport West (T1, T2, T3)	Xi'an Beizhan	2019-09-29	29.31 km (18.21 mi)
	Line 14 (Xi'an Metro)	Xi'an Beizhan	Heshao	2021-06-29	13.65 km (8.48 mi)
	Line 16 (Xi'an Metro)	Qinchuangyuanzhongxin	Shijingli	2023-06-27	15.03 km (9.34 mi)
	Line 1 (Xiamen Metro)	Yannei	Zhenhai Road	2017-12-31	30.3 km (18.83 mi)
	Line 2 (Xiamen Metro)	Wuyuanwan	Tianzhushan	2019-12-25	41.64 km (25.87 mi)
	Line 3 (Xiamen Metro)	Xiamen Railway Station	Caicuo	2021-06-25	26.5 km (16.5 mi)
	Line 1 (Xuzhou Metro)	Luwo	Xuzhoudong Railway Station	2019-09-28	21.967 km (13.65 mi)
	Line 2 (Xuzhou Metro)	Keyunbei	Xinchengqudong	2020-11-28	24.25 km (15.07 mi)
	Line 3 (Xuzhou Metro)	Xiadian	Gaoxinqu'nan	2021-06-28	18.13 km (11.27 mi)
	Line 1 (Zhengzhou Metro)	Henan University of Technology	Xiliuhu	2017-01-12	09.65 km (6.00 mi)
	Line 1 (Zhengzhou Metro)	Xiliuhu	Zhengzhou Sports Center	2013-12-28	26.2 km (16.28 mi)
	Line 1 (Zhengzhou Metro)	Zhengzhou Sports Center	Wenyuanbeilu	2017-01-12	05.36 km (3.33 mi)
	Line 1 (Zhengzhou Metro)	Wenyuanbeilu	New Campus of Henan University	2019-11-21	05.36 km (3.33 mi)
	Line 2 (Zhengzhou Metro)	Jiahe	Liuzhuang	2019-12-28	10.25 km (6.37 mi)
	Line 2 (Zhengzhou Metro)	Liuzhuang	Nansihuan	2016-08-19	20.649 km (12.83 mi)
	Line 3 (Zhengzhou Metro)	Henan Sports Center	Henan Orthopaedics Hospital	2020-12-26	25.49 km (15.84 mi)
	Line 3 (Zhengzhou Metro)	Henan Orthopaedics Hospital	Yinggang	2021-06-26	25.49 km (15.84 mi)
	Line 3 (Zhengzhou Metro)	Yinggang	Binhe Xincheng Nan	2023-09-08	6.316 km (3.92 mi)
	Line 4 (Zhengzhou Metro)	Laoyachen	Langzhuang	2020-12-26	29.29 km (18.20 mi)
	Line 5 (Zhengzhou Metro)	Yuejigongyuan (loop)	Yuejigongyuan (loop)	2019-05-20	40.4 km (25.10 mi)
	Line 6 (Zhengzhou Metro)	Jiayu	Changzhuang	2022-09-30	16.7 km (10.38 mi)
	Line 10 (Zhengzhou Metro)	Zhengzhou railway station	Zhengzhou West railway station	2023-09-28	21.8 km (13.55 mi)
	Line 12 (Zhengzhou Metro)	Lianghu	Longzihu Dong	2023-12-20	16.538 km (10.28 mi)
	Line 14 (Zhengzhou Metro)	Tielu	Olympic Sports Center	2019-09-19	7.455 km (4.63 mi)
	Zhengxu line	Chang'an Lu Bei	Xuchangdong	2023-12-28	67.13 km (41.71 mi)
	Chengjiao line	Nansihuan	Xinzheng International Airport	2017-01-12	31.7 km (19.70 mi)
	Chengjiao line	Xinzheng International Airport	Zhengzhou Hangkonggang Railway Station	2022-06-20	8.98 km (5.58 mi)

== Rapid transit ==
=== Overview ===
System	Locale	Administrative division	Lines	Stations (Note: All interchange stations (i.e. different sets of platforms) are counted once.)	Length (km(mi))	Operation start	Most recent expansion	Annual ridership	Busiest station	Ave. daily ridership (thousands) (Note: Ridership for the past 5 years.)					
System	Locale	Administrative division	Lines	Stations	Length (km(mi))	Operation start	Most recent expansion	Annual ridership	Busiest station	2020	2021	2022	2023	2024	2025
Beijing Subway	Beijing & Langfang	Beijing & Hebei	28 (Note: Both Xijiao Line and Yizhuang T1 line are light rail lines and not included.)	523	909 km (565 mi)	1969-10-01 (Note: Open for public operation on 15 January 1971 (1971-01-15).)	2025-12-27	3450 million (2023)	Xizhimen (2018)	6,252.2	8,370.8	6,182.4	9,434.3	9,866.4	
Changchun Rail Transit	Changchun	Jilin	6 (Note: 3 metro lines, 3 light rail lines)	109 (Note: 54 stations on metro lines, 62 stations on light rail lines, 7 stations are metro-light rail transfer stations)	194.19 km (120.66 mi) (Note: 72.57 km (45.09 mi) of metro lines, 68.2 km (42.4 mi) of light rail lines)	2017-09-30 (Note: First line opened on 2002-10-30, as a light rail system)	2024-03-28	127.3 million (2018)	Changchun Railway Station (2018)	420.3	534.2	365.3	599.3	607.5	
Changsha Metro	Changsha & Xiangtan	Hunan	7	135	228.49 km (141.98 mi)	2014-04-29	2024-06-28	250.3 million (2018) (Note: Changsha Maglev Express is excluded.)	Wuyi Square (2018)	1,033.3	1,582.4	1,570.9	2,566.2	2,780.4	
Changsha Maglev Express	Changsha	Hunan	1	3	18.55 km (11.53 mi)	2016-05-06	N/A		South Railway Station						
Changzhou Metro	Changzhou	Jiangsu	2	43	54.03 km (33.57 mi)	2019-09-21	2021-06-28	10.3 million (2019)		65.3	131.1	129.9	200.3	197.0	
Chengdu Metro	Chengdu	Sichuan	17 (Note: Not including Chengdu Tram Line 2, which is a light rail line and not fully grade separated.)	449	721.3 km (448.2 mi)	2010-09-27	2025-12-16	1157.6 million (2018)	Chunxi Road (2018)	3,310.5	4,885.3	4,275.3	5,774.4	6,002.5	
Chongqing Rail Transit	Chongqing	Chongqing	12	327	621.98 km (386.48 mi)	2004-11-06	2026-02-10	857.9 million (2018)	Lianglukou (2018)	2,290.0	2,992.0	2,499.1	3,657.1	3,980.7	
Dalian Metro	Dalian	Liaoning	6	100	237.74 km (147.72 mi)	2002-11-08	2023-03-17	192.3 million (2018)	Xi'an Road (2018)	342.9	426.2	394.6	662.9	734.1	
Dongguan Rail Transit	Dongguan	Guangdong	2	40	95.2 km (59.2 mi)	2016-05-27	2025-11-28	46.1 million (2018)	Hongfu Road (2018)	97.5	111.4	89.8	124.2	135.1	
Foshan Metro	Foshan & Guangzhou	Guangdong	3	61	138.1 km (85.8 mi)	2010-11-03	2022-12-28	110 million (2017)	Zumiao (2017)		89.0	63.3	187.6	238.7	
Fuzhou Metro	Fuzhou	Fujian	6	116	210.3 km (130.7 mi)	2016-05-16	2025-12-10	314.556 million (2025)	Dongjiekou (2018)	259.5	340.4	310.3	624.0	835.2	862.9
Guangzhou Metro	Guangzhou & Foshan	Guangdong	19	398 (Note: Not including Haizhu Tram (THZ1), which is a light rail line and not fully grade separated.)	779.9 km (484.6 mi)	1997-06-28	2025-12-29	3029.5 million (2018) (Note: Guangfo line is excluded. Also see Foshan Metro.)	Tiyu Xilu (2018)	6,591.6	7,755.4	6,460.1	8,572.4	8,938.7	
Guiyang Metro	Guiyang	Guizhou	3	82	149.05 km (92.62 mi)	2017-12-28	2023-12-16	7.4 million (2018)	West Zhongshan Road (2018)	122.1	294.7	254.9	366.7	694.6	
Hangzhou Metro	Hangzhou	Zhejiang	13	270	516.2 km (320.8 mi)	2012-11-24	2025-01-01	529.9 million (2018)	East Railway Station (2018)	970.9	2,432.7	3,474.5	2,979.3	3,300.5	
Harbin Metro	Harbin	Heilongjiang	3	66	91.57 km (56.90 mi)	2013-09-26	2023-12-26	97.4 million (2018)	The Second Affiliated Hospital of Harbin Medical University (2018)	140.9	195.5	388.5	770.7	987.4	
Hefei Metro	Hefei	Anhui	6	202	306.8 km (190.6 mi)	2016-12-26	2025-12-26	153.2 million (2018)	Dadongmen (2018)	532.9	741.7	726.1	1,125.7	1,432.7	
Hohhot Metro	Hohhot	Inner Mongolia	2	43	49.039 km (30.471 mi)	2019-12-29	2020-10-01			143.4	147.2	196.1	260.0	406.0	
Jinan Metro	Jinan	Shandong	6 (Note: Both Jiyang Line and SkyShuttle Line 1 are not included.)	140	181.7 km (112.9 mi)	2019-04-01	2025-12-30			172.8	204.4	444.9	424.7		
Jinhua Rail Transit	Jinhua	Zhejiang	2	31	107.17 km (66.59 mi)	2022-08-30	2023-04-07			Not opened	Not opened				
Kunming Metro	Kunming	Yunnan	6	103	164.3 km (102.1 mi)	2012-06-28	2022-06-29	199.6 million (2018)	Dongfeng Square (2018)	435.1	606.8	508.8	800.2	838.8	
Lanzhou Metro	Lanzhou	Gansu	2	27	34.96 km (21.72 mi)	2019-06-23	2023-06-29			197.5	184.4	120.9	243.3	440.1	
Luoyang Subway	Luoyang	Henan	2	33	43.554 km (27.063 mi)	2021-03-28	2021-12-26			Not opened	92.8	161.5	253.8	324.2	
Nanchang Metro	Nanchang	Jiangxi	4	94	163 km (101 mi)	2015-12-26	2021-12-26	141.8 million (2018)	Bayi Square (2015-2020)	373.9	707.5	654.8	1,044.0	1,199.3	
Nanjing Metro	Nanjing & Jurong	Jiangsu	13	206	658.1 km (408.9 mi)	2005-09-03	2023-12-28	1118.8 million (2018)	Xinjiekou (2018)	2,179.9	2,404.9	2,101.3	2,766.1	2,994.0	
Nanning Metro	Nanning	Guangxi	5	93	132.1 km (82.1 mi)	2016-06-28	2021-12-16	213.6 million (2018)	Chaoyang Square (2018)	569.6	786.8	749.4	959.0	990.5	
Nantong Metro	Nantong	Jiangsu	2	43	60.03 km (37.30 mi)	2022-11-10	2023-12-27			Not opened	Not opened	68.0	143.1	280.3	
Ningbo Rail Transit	Ningbo	Zhejiang	8	200	357.45 km (222.11 mi)	2014-05-30	2026-01-16	124.4 million (2018)	Gulou (2018)	297.6	697.6	834.9	1,082.4	1,103.6	
Qingdao Metro	Qingdao	Shandong	8	186	359.36 km (223.30 mi)	2015-12-16	2024-04-26	153.9 million (2018)	May 4th Square (2018)	316.0	686.8	968.3	1,356.2	1,398.0	
Shanghai Metro	Shanghai & Kunshan	Shanghai & Jiangsu	19 (Note: Only 18 metro lines and Pujiang Line are included.)	513	889.96 km (553.00 mi)	1993-05-28	2025-12-27	3710.2 million (2018)	People's Square (2018)	7,744.8	9,765.4	6,436.2	10,023.4	10,281.1	
Shanghai Maglev Train	Shanghai	Shanghai	1	2	29.863 km (18.556 mi)	2002-12-31	N/A		Longyang Road						
Shaoxing Metro	Shaoxing	Zhejiang	2	42	65.2 km (40.5 mi)	2021-06-28	2025-06-30			Not opened		125.4	147.8	183.0	
Shenyang Metro	Shenyang	Liaoning	5	111	218 km (135 mi)	2010-09-27	2023-09-29	329.9 million (2018)	Qingniandajie (2018)	846.9	1,049.7	842.2	1,362.2	1,783.2	
Shenzhen Metro	Shenzhen	Guangdong	17	421	642.02 km (398.93 mi)	2004-12-28	2025-12-28	1646.1 million (2018)	Laojie (2018)	4,413.0	5,953.6	4,838.3	7,399.6	8,452.5	
Shijiazhuang Metro	Shijiazhuang	Hebei	3	60	76.5 km (47.5 mi)	2017-06-26	2021-04-06	87.6 million (2018)	Xinbaiguangchang (2018)	195.7	283.1	241.8	474.1	541.6	
Suzhou Metro	Suzhou	Jiangsu	9	277	345 km (214 mi)	2012-04-28	2024-12-01	363 million (2019)	Dongfangzhimen (2018)	828.7	1,107.4	900.9	1,506.1	1,780.3	
Taiyuan Metro	Taiyuan	Shanxi	2	46	52.39 km (32.55 mi)	2020-12-26	2025-02-22			146.9	106.8	90.6	126.1	131.5	
Taizhou Rail Transit	Taizhou	Zhejiang	1	15	52.568 km (32.664 mi)	2022-12-28	N/A			Not opened	Not opened				
Tianjin Metro	Tianjin	Tianjin	13	258 (Note: Jinjing Line is excluded because this line is classified as a commuter/suburban rail.)	370.3 km (230.1 mi)	1980-08-10 (Note: Open for public operation on 28 December 1984 (1984-12-28). The system was closed on 1 September 2001 (2001-09-01) for renovation and reopened on 12 June 2006 (2006-06-12).)	2026-01-18	408.5 million (2018)	Tianjinzhan (2018)	933.6	1,263.8	868.1	1,558.6	1,753.9	
Ürümqi Metro	Ürümqi	Xinjiang	1	21	45.46 km (28.25 mi)	2018-10-25	2019-06-28	2.4 million (2018)							
Wenzhou Rail Transit	Wenzhou	Zhejiang	2	36	116.452 km (72.360 mi)	2019-01-23	2023-08-26			236.2	27.8	53.6	281.9	145.8	
Wuhan Metro	Wuhan	Hubei	12	312	581.02 km (361.03 mi)	2004-07-24	2024-12-27	1054.0 million (2018)	Jianghan Road (2018)	2,055.0	2,737.9	2,420.0	3,676.3	3,977.1	
Wuhu Rail Transit	Wuhu	Anhui	2	35	46.25 km (28.74 mi)	2021-11-03	2021-12-28			Not opened	55.4	119.0	141.7	163.7	
Wuxi Metro	Wuxi	Jiangsu	5	89	145.2 km (90.2 mi)	2014-07-01	2024-01-31	103.1 million (2018)	Sanyang Plaza (2018)	356.9	401.6	583.0	711.3	1,172.5	
Xi'an Metro	Xi'an & Xianyang	Shaanxi	13	283 (Note: Xihu Line is not included because this line is classified as a commuter rail.)	423.2 km (263.0 mi)	2011-09-16	2025-12-29	746.2 million (2018)	Xiaozhai (2018)	1,996.3	2,811.4	2,243.2	3,536.5	3,822.3	
Xiamen Metro	Xiamen	Fujian	5	92	98.4 km (61.1 mi)	2017-12-31	2026-09-16	275.904 million (2025)	Lücuo (2020)	312.2	464.4	540.3	675.1	729.4	755.9
Xuzhou Metro	Xuzhou	Jiangsu	4	70	95.44 km (59.30 mi)	2019-09-28	2025-09-28	7.5 million (2019)			366.0	170.8	303.7	444.0	
Zhengzhou Metro	Zhengzhou	Henan	11	187	449.81 km (279.50 mi)	2013-12-28	2023-12-28	293.4 million (2018)	Zhengzhou Railway Station (2018)	930.2	1,378.6	896.6	1,601.1	1,976.7	
Total	50 locales	29 administrative divisions	291	6,617 (Note: 12 stations between systems are not counted multiple times, 6 between Foshan Metro and Guangzhou Metro, 2 between Shanghai Metro and Shanghai maglev train, 2 between Changsha Metro and Changsha Maglev Express, 1 between Shanghai Metro and Suzhou Metro, and 1 between Hangzhou Metro and Shaoxing Metro.)	12,502.586 km (7,768.747 mi)			23.063 billion		48.094 million	64.752 million				

==== Urban rapid transit lines ====
Legend

– Lines in operation
– Lines under testing

Urban rail transit lines
Color	Line	System	Length	Stations	Car configuration	Stock size (Note: Below is a comparison of the different vehicle types in Chinese rapid transit.: Vehicle type / Length (m) / Width (m) / Capacity; Type A / 22.8 / 3.0-3.08 / 310; Type B (Note: Type B_{1} cars are powered by third rail，while type B_{2} cars are powered by overhead wiring.) / 19.0 / 2.8-2.88 / 240; Type A_{S} (Note: Special vehicle type for Chongqing) / 19.0 / 3.0-3.08 / 254-266; Type A_{H} (Note: Special vehicle type for Hangzhou) / 19.52 / 3.0-3.08 / 254; Type L_{B} / 16.8 / 2.8 / 215-240; Type C (Note: Divided into 3 types, including C-I, C-II, and C-III, each type has high-floor and low-floor variants) / 18.9-30.4 / 2.6 / 200-315; Type D / 22.0 / 3.3 / -)	Commencement
	Line 1	Beijing	31.0 km (19.3 mi)	23	6	B1	1969-10-01
	Line 2	Beijing	23.1 km (14.4 mi)	18	6	B1	1984-09-20
	Line 3	Beijing	14.7 km (9.1 mi)	10	8	A	2024-12-15
	Line 4	Beijing	28.2 km (17.5 mi)	24	6	B1	2009-09-28
	Line 5	Beijing	27.6 km (17.1 mi)	23	6	B1	2007-10-07
	Line 6	Beijing	53.4 km (33.2 mi)	34	8	B2	2012-12-30
	Line 7	Beijing	40.3 km (25.0 mi)	30	8	B1	2014-12-28
	Line 8	Beijing	49.5 km (30.8 mi)	34	6	B1	2008-07-19
	Line 9	Beijing	16.5 km (10.3 mi)	13	6	B1	2011-12-31
	Line 10	Beijing	57.1 km (35.5 mi)	45	6	B1	2008-07-19
	Line 11	Beijing	4.2 km (2.6 mi)	4	4	A	2021-12-31
	Line 12	Beijing	27.5 km (17.1 mi)	20	8	A	2024-12-15
	Line 13	Beijing	40.85 km (25.38 mi)	17	6	B1	2002-09-22
	Line 14	Beijing	47.3 km (29.4 mi)	33	6	A	2013-05-05
	Line 15	Beijing	41.4 km (25.7 mi)	20	6	B1	2010-12-30
	Line 16	Beijing	48.9 km (30.4 mi)	29	8	A	2016-12-31
	Line 17	Beijing	40.7 km (25.3 mi)	16	8	A	2021-12-31
	Line 19	Beijing	20.9 km (13.0 mi)	10	8	A	2021-12-31
	Line S1	Beijing	10.2 km (6.3 mi)	8	6	ML	2017-12-30
	Batong line	Beijing	23.4 km (14.5 mi)	13	6	B1	2003-12-27
	Capital Airport Express	Beijing	29.9 km (18.6 mi)	5	4	LB	2008-07-19
	Changping line	Beijing	43.2 km (26.8 mi)	18	6	B1	2010-12-30
	Daxing Airport Express	Beijing	41.36 km (25.70 mi)	3	4/8	D (two doors per car)	2019-09-26
	Daxing line	Beijing	21.76 km (13.52 mi)	11	6	B1	2010-12-30
	Fangshan line	Beijing	31.8 km (19.8 mi)	16	6	B1	2010-12-30
	Yanfang line	Beijing	14.4 km (8.9 mi)	9	4	B1	2017-12-30
	Yizhuang line	Beijing	23.2 km (14.4 mi)	14	6	B1	2010-12-30
	Line 1	Changchun	18.142 km (11.273 mi)	15	6	B_{2}	2017-06-30
	Line 2	Changchun	24.86 km (15.45 mi)	21	6	B_{2}	2018-08-30
	Line 3	Changchun	34.1 km (21.2 mi)	34	6	C (Low-floor light rail)	2002-10-30
	Line 4	Changchun	20.8 km (12.9 mi)	20	6	C (Low-floor light rail)	2011-06-30
	Line 6	Changchun	29.57 km (18.37 mi)	22	6	B	2024-03-28
	Line 8	Changchun	13.1 km (8.1 mi)	12	6	C (Low-floor light rail)	2018-10-30
	Line 1	Changsha	23.57 km (14.65 mi)	20	6	B2	2016-06-28
	Line 2	Changsha	26.58 km (16.52 mi)	23	6	B2	2014-04-29
	Line 3	Changsha	53.69 km (33.36 mi)	33	6	B	2020-06-28
	Line 4	Changsha	33.5 km (20.8 mi)	25	6	B2	2019-05-26
	Line 5	Changsha	22.5 km (14.0 mi)	18	6	B	2020-06-28
	Line 6	Changsha	48.11 km (29.89 mi)	34	6	A	2022-06-28
	Maglev Express	Changsha ML	18.55 km (11.53 mi)	3	3	ML	2016-05-06
	Line 1	Changzhou	34.24 km (21.28 mi)	29	6	B	2019-09-21
	Line 2	Changzhou	19.79 km (12.30 mi)	15	6	B	2021-06-28
	Line 1	Chengdu	40.99 km (25.47 mi)	35	6	B2	2010-09-27
	Line 2	Chengdu	42.32 km (26.30 mi)	32	6	B2	2012-09-16
	Line 3	Chengdu	49.85 km (30.98 mi)	37	6	B2	2016-07-31
	Line 4	Chengdu	43.28 km (26.89 mi)	30	6	B2	2015-12-26
	Line 5	Chengdu	49.018 km (30.5 mi)	41	8	A	2019-12-27
	Line 6	Chengdu	68.76 km (42.7 mi)	54	8	A	2020-12-18
	Line 7	Chengdu	38.61 km (23.99 mi)	31	6	A	2017-12-06
	Line 8	Chengdu	29.17 km (18.1 mi)	25	6	A	2020-12-18
	Line 9	Chengdu	22.18 km (13.8 mi)	13	8	A	2020-12-18
	Line 10	Chengdu	37.972 km (23.6 mi)	16	6	A	2017-09-06
	Line 17	Chengdu	5.486 km (3.4 mi)	3	8	A	2020-12-18
	Line 18	Chengdu	69.39 km (43.12 mi)	12	8	A	2020-09-27
	Line 19	Chengdu	62.69 km (38.95 mi)	18	4	A	2023-11-28 (Note: Line realignment, previously part of Line 17 since 18 December 2020 (2020-12-18).)
	Line 1	Chongqing	43.71 km (27.16 mi)	25	6	B2	2011-07-28
	Line 2	Chongqing	31.36 km (19.49 mi)	25	4/6/8	HL	2004-11-06
	Line 3	Chongqing	67.09 km (41.69 mi)	45	6/8	HL	2011-09-29
	Line 4	Chongqing	48.5 km (30.1 mi)	24	6	AS	2018-12-28
	Line 5	Chongqing	48.66 km (30.24 mi)	31	6	AS	2017-12-28
	Jiangtiao line	Chongqing	26.33 km (16.36 mi)	7	6	AS	2022-08-06
	Line 6	Chongqing	85.54 km (53.15 mi)	40	6	B2	2012-09-28
	Line 9	Chongqing	40.1 km (24.9 mi)	29	6	AS	2022-01-25
	Line 10	Chongqing	43.26 km (26.88 mi)	26	6	AS	2017-12-28
	Line 18	Chongqing	28.96 km (17.99 mi)	19	6	AS	2023-12-28
	Loop line	Chongqing	50.93 km (31.65 mi)	33	6	AS	2018-12-28
	Line 1	Dalian	28.34 km (17.61 mi)	22	6	B2	2015-10-30
	Line 2	Dalian	37.97 km (23.59 mi)	29	6	B2	2015-05-22
	Line 3	Dalian	63.45 km (39.43 mi)	18	2/4	B2	2002-11-08
	Line 5	Dalian	24.48 km (15.21 mi)	18	6	B2	2023-03-17
	Line 12	Dalian	40.38 km (25.09 mi)	8	4	B2	2013-12-30
	Line 13	Dalian	43.152 km (26.813 mi)	12	4	B2	2021-12-28
	Line 2	Dongguan	37.8 km (23.5 mi)	15	6	B2	2016-05-27
	Line 2	Foshan	32.41 km (20.14 mi)	17	6	B	2021-12-28
	Line 3	Foshan	40.72 km (25.30 mi)	22	6	B	2022-12-28
	Line 1	Fuzhou	29.84 km (18.54 mi)	25	6	B2	2016-05-18
	Line 2	Fuzhou	30.629 km (19.032 mi)	22	6	B2	2019-04-26
	Line 4	Fuzhou	24.0 km (14.9 mi)	19	6	B2	2023-08-27
	Line 5	Fuzhou	27.71 km (17.22 mi)	20	6	B2	2022-04-29
	Line 6	Fuzhou	31.346 km (19.5 mi)	14	4	B2	2022-08-28
	Line 1	Guangzhou	18.5 km (11.5 mi)	16	6	A	1997-06-28
	Line 2	Guangzhou	31.8 km (19.8 mi)	24	6	A	2002-12-29
	Line 3	Guangzhou	74.89 km (46.53 mi)	30	6	B2	2005-12-26
	Line 4	Guangzhou	60.04 km (37.31 mi)	23	4	LB	2005-12-26
	Line 5	Guangzhou	41.7 km (25.9 mi)	30	6	LB	2009-12-28
	Line 6	Guangzhou	41.7 km (25.9 mi)	31	4	LB	2013-12-28
	Line 7	Guangzhou	54.24 km (33.70 mi)	27	6	B2	2016-12-28
	Line 8	Guangzhou	33.9 km (21.1 mi)	28	6	A	2010-09-25
	Line 9	Guangzhou	20.1 km (12.5 mi)	11	6	B2	2017-12-28
	Line 13	Guangzhou	28.3 km (17.6 mi)	11	8	A	2017-12-28
	Line 14	Guangzhou	75.4 km (46.9 mi)	22	6	B1	2017-12-28
	Line 18	Guangzhou	58.3 km (36.2 mi)	8	8	D	2021-09-28
	Line 21	Guangzhou	61.5 km (38.2 mi)	21	6	B1	2018-12-28
	Line 22	Guangzhou	18.2 km (11.3 mi)	4	8	D	2022-03-31
	Zhujiang New Town APM line	Guangzhou	3.9 km (2.4 mi)	9	2	P	2010-11-08
	Guangfo line	Guangzhou & Foshan	39.6 km (24.6 mi)	25	4	B2	2010-09-25
	Line 1	Guiyang	35.11 km (21.8 mi)	25	6	B2	2017-12-28
	Line 2	Guiyang	40.6 km (25.2 mi)	32	6	B2	2021-04-28
	Line 3	Guiyang	43.03 km (26.7 mi)	29	6	B2	2023-12-16
	Line 1	Hangzhou	52.21 km (32.44 mi)	33	6	B2	2012-11-24
	Line 2	Hangzhou	42.82 km (26.61 mi)	33	6	B2	2014-11-24
	Line 3	Hangzhou	57.5 km (35.7 mi)	37	6	AH	2022-02-21
	Line 4	Hangzhou	46.85 km (29.11 mi)	32	6	B2	2015-02-02
	Line 5	Hangzhou	53.92 km (33.50 mi)	39	6	AH	2019-06-24
	Line 6	Hangzhou	58.5 km (36.4 mi)	36	6	AH	2020-12-30
	Line 7	Hangzhou	47.48 km (29.50 mi)	24	6	A	2020-12-30
	Line 8	Hangzhou	17.17 km (10.67 mi)	9	6	A	2021-06-28
	Line 9	Hangzhou	29.5 km (18.3 mi)	21	6	B2	2021-07-10 (Note: Line realignment, previously part of Line 1 since 24 November 2012 (2012-11-24).)
	Line 10	Hangzhou	14.67 km (9.12 mi)	12	6	A	2022-02-21
	Line 16	Hangzhou	35.12 km (21.82 mi)	12	4	B2	2020-04-23
	Line 19	Hangzhou	59.14 km (36.75 mi)	14	6	A	2022-09-22
	Line 1	Harbin	26.27 km (16.32 mi)	23	6	B2	2013-09-26
	Line 2	Harbin	28.19 km (17.52 mi)	19	6	B2	2021-09-19
	Line 3	Harbin	28.71 km (17.84 mi)	28	6	B2	2017-01-26
	Line 1	Hefei	29.16 km (18.12 mi)	26	6	B2	2016-12-26
	Line 2	Hefei	42.76 km (26.57 mi)	35	6	B2	2017-12-26
	Line 3	Hefei	48.5 km (30.1 mi)	40	6	B	2019-12-26
	Line 4	Hefei	55.4 km (34.4 mi)	38	6	B	2021-12-26
	Line 5	Hefei	40.7 km (25.3 mi)	33	6	B	2020-12-26
	Line 1	Hohhot	21.719 km (13.5 mi)	20	6	B	2019-12-29
	Line 2	Hohhot	27.32 km (17.0 mi)	24	6	B	2020-10-01
	Line 1	Jinan	26.27 km (16.32 mi)	11	4	B1	2019-04-01
	Line 2	Jinan	36.39 km (22.61 mi)	19	6	B1	2021-03-26
	Line 3	Jinan	21.592 km (13.417 mi)	12	6	B	2019-12-28
	Jinyi Line	Jinhua	58.071 km (36.084 mi)	17	6	B	2022-08-30
	Yidong Line	Jinhua	48.38 km (30.06 mi)	15	6	B	2022-12-28
	Line 1	Kunming	34.0 km (21.1 mi)	22	6	B1	2013-05-20
	Line 2	Kunming	12.4 km (7.7 mi)	14	6	B1	2014-04-30
	Line 3	Kunming	23.36 km (14.52 mi)	20	6	B1	2017-08-29
	Line 4	Kunming	43.4 km (27.0 mi)	29	6	B1	2020-09-23
	Line 5	Kunming	26.45 km (16.44 mi)	22	6	B1	2022-06-29
	Line 6	Kunming	25.3 km (15.7 mi)	8	6	B1	2012-06-28
	Line 1	Lanzhou	25.9 km (16.1 mi)	20	6	A	2019-06-23
	Line 2	Lanzhou	9.06 km (5.63 mi)	9	6	A	2023-06-29
	Line 1	Luoyang	25.342 km (15.747 mi)	19	6	B	2021-03-28
	Line 2	Luoyang	18.216 km (11.319 mi)	15	6	B	2021-12-26
	Line 1	Nanchang	28.74 km (17.86 mi)	24	6	B2	2015-12-26
	Line 2	Nanchang	31.51 km (19.58 mi)	28	6	B2	2017-08-18
	Line 3	Nanchang	28.5 km (17.7 mi)	22	6	B2	2020-12-26
	Line 4	Nanchang	39.6 km (24.6 mi)	29	6	B2	2021-12-26
	Line 1	Nanjing	45.44 km (28.24 mi)	32	6	A	2005-09-03
	Line 2	Nanjing	43.35 km (26.94 mi)	30	6	A	2010-05-28
	Line 3	Nanjing	44.87 km (27.88 mi)	29	6	A	2015-04-01
	Line 4	Nanjing	33.75 km (20.97 mi)	18	6	B2	2017-01-18
	Line 7	Nanjing	24.50 km (15.22 mi)	19	6	B2	2022-12-28
	Line 10	Nanjing	21.6 km (13.4 mi)	14	6	A	2014-07-01
	Line S1	Nanjing	36.32 km (22.57 mi)	9	6	B2	2014-07-01
	Line S3	Nanjing	36.26 km (22.53 mi)	19	6	B2	2017-12-06
	Line S4	Nanjing	46.2 km (28.7 mi)	10	4	D	2023-06-28
	Line S6	Nanjing	43.59 km (27.09 mi)	13	4	B2	2021-12-28
	Line S7	Nanjing	28.87 km (17.94 mi)	9	4	B2	2018-05-26
	Line S8	Nanjing	47.29 km (29.38 mi)	19	4	B2	2014-08-01
	Line S9	Nanjing	52.39 km (32.55 mi)	6	3	B2	2017-12-30
	Line 1	Nanning	32.1 km (19.9 mi)	25	6	B2	2016-06-28
	Line 2	Nanning	27.5 km (17.1 mi)	23	6	B2	2017-12-28
	Line 3	Nanning	27.9 km (17.3 mi)	23	6	B2	2019-06-06
	Line 4	Nanning	20.7 km (12.9 mi)	16	6	B2	2020-11-23
	Line 5	Nanning	20.2 km (12.6 mi)	17	6	B2	2021-12-16
	Line 1	Nantong	39.182 km (24.347 mi)	28	6	B	2022-11-10
	Line 2	Nantong	20.85 km (12.96 mi)	17	6	B	2023-12-27
	Line 1	Ningbo	46.17 km (28.69 mi)	29	6	B2	2014-05-30
	Line 2	Ningbo	36.85 km (22.90 mi)	27	6	B2	2015-09-26
	Line 3	Ningbo	38.63 km (24.00 mi)	24	6	B2	2019-06-30
	Line 4	Ningbo	35.95 km (22.34 mi)	25	6	B2	2020-12-23
	Line 5	Ningbo	27.6 km (17.1 mi)	22	6	B2	2021-12-28
	Line 1	Qingdao	60.11 km (37.35 mi)	41	6	B1	2020-12-24
	Line 2	Qingdao	25.09 km (15.59 mi)	22	6	B1	2017-12-10
	Line 3	Qingdao	24.95 km (15.50 mi)	22	6	B1	2015-12-16
	Line 4	Qingdao	30.71 km (19.08 mi)	25	6	B1	2022-12-26
	Line 6	Qingdao	30.762 km (19.115 mi)	21	6	B1	2024-04-26
	Line 8	Qingdao	49.61 km (30.83 mi)	11	6	B1	2020-12-24
	Oceantec Valley Line	Qingdao	58.35 km (36.26 mi)	22	4	B1	2018-04-23
	West Coast Line	Qingdao	69.63 km (43.27 mi)	23	4	B1	2018-12-26
	Line 1	Shanghai	36.76 km (22.84 mi)	28	8	A	1993-05-28
	Line 2	Shanghai	59.71 km (37.10 mi)	30	8	A	2000-06-11
	Line 3	Shanghai	40.12 km (24.93 mi)	29	6	A	2000-12-26
	Line 4	Shanghai	33.81 km (21.01 mi)	26	6	A	2005-12-31
	Line 5	Shanghai	32.73 km (20.34 mi)	19	4/6	C (High-floor heavy rail)	2003-11-25
	Line 6	Shanghai	32.54 km (20.22 mi)	28	4	C (High-floor heavy rail)	2007-12-29
	Line 7	Shanghai	43.13 km (26.80 mi)	33	6	A	2009-12-05
	Line 8	Shanghai	36.73 km (22.82 mi)	30	6/7	C (High-floor heavy rail)	2007-12-29
	Line 9	Shanghai	63.80 km (39.64 mi)	35	6	A	2007-12-29
	Line 10	Shanghai	44.94 km (27.92 mi)	37	6	A	2010-04-10
	Line 11	Shanghai	79.27 km (49.26 mi)	39	6	A	2009-12-31
	Line 12	Shanghai	39.49 km (24.54 mi)	32	6	A	2013-12-29
	Line 13	Shanghai	38.27 km (23.78 mi)	31	6	A	2012-12-30
	Line 14	Shanghai	38.18 km (23.72 mi)	30	8	A	2021-12-30
	Line 15	Shanghai	41.22 km (25.61 mi)	30	6	A	2021-01-23
	Line 16	Shanghai	57.80 km (35.92 mi)	13	3/6	A	2013-12-29
	Line 17	Shanghai	34.72 km (21.57 mi)	13	6	A	2017-12-30
	Line 18	Shanghai	36.50 km (22.68 mi)	26	6	A	2020-12-26
	Pujiang line	Shanghai	6.60 km (4.10 mi)	6	4	P	2018-03-31
	Maglev line	Shanghai ML	29.863 km (18.556 mi)	2	5	MH	2004-01-01
	Line 1	Shaoxing	51.2 km (31.8 mi)	30	6	B	2021-06-28
	Line 2	Shaoxing	10.73 km (6.67 mi)	9	4	B	2023-07-26
	Line 1	Shenyang	27.80 km (17.27 mi)	22	6	B2	2009-09-23
	Line 2	Shenyang	45.58 km (28.32 mi)	33	6	B2	2012-01-08
	Line 4	Shenyang	34.112 km (21.196 mi)	23	6	B2	2023-09-29
	Line 9	Shenyang	28.996 km (18.017 mi)	23	6	B2	2019-05-25
	Line 10	Shenyang	27.21 km (16.91 mi)	21	6	B2	2020-04-29
	Line 1	Shenzhen	41.04 km (25.50 mi)	30	6	A	2004-12-28
	Line 2	Shenzhen	39.78 km (24.72 mi)	32	6	A	2010-12-08
	Line 3	Shenzhen	43.45 km (27.00 mi)	31	6	B1	2010-12-28
	Line 4	Shenzhen	31.3 km (19.4 mi)	23	6	A	2004-12-28
	Line 5	Shenzhen	47.393 km (29.449 mi)	34	6	A	2011-06-22
	Line 6	Shenzhen	49.4 km (30.7 mi)	27	6	A	2020-08-18
	Line 6B	Shenzhen	6.13 km (3.81 mi)	4	6	B	2022-11-28
	Line 7	Shenzhen	30.173 km (18.749 mi)	27	6	A	2016-10-28
	Line 8	Shenzhen	20.38 km (12.66 mi)	11	6	A	2020-10-28
	Line 9	Shenzhen	36.18 km (22.48 mi)	32	6	A	2016-10-28
	Line 10	Shenzhen	29.34 km (18.23 mi)	24	8	A	2020-08-18
	Line 11	Shenzhen	53.14 km (33.02 mi)	19	8	A	2016-06-28
	Line 12	Shenzhen	40.56 km (25.20 mi)	33	6	A	2022-11-28
	Line 14	Shenzhen	50.34 km (31.28 mi)	18	8	A	2022-10-28
	Line 16	Shenzhen	29.20 km (18.14 mi)	24	6	A	2022-12-28
	Line 20	Shenzhen	8.43 km (5.24 mi)	5	8	A	2021-12-28
	Line 1	Shijiazhuang	34.3 km (21.3 mi)	26	6	A	2017-06-26
	Line 2	Shijiazhuang	15.5 km (9.6 mi)	15	6	A	2020-08-26
	Line 3	Shijiazhuang	26.7 km (16.6 mi)	22	6	A	2017-06-26
	Line 1	Suzhou	25.739 km (15.993 mi)	24	4	B1	2012-04-28
	Line 2	Suzhou	40.4 km (25.1 mi)	35	5	B1	2013-12-28
	Line 3	Suzhou	45.272 km (28.1 mi)	37	6	B1	2019-12-25
	Line 4	Suzhou	41.5 km (25.8 mi)	31	6	B1	2017-04-15
	Line 5	Suzhou	44.1 km (27.4 mi)	34	6	B	2021-06-29
	Line 6	Suzhou	36.12 km (22.44 mi)	31	6	B	2024-06-29
	Line 7	Suzhou	35.2 km (21.9 mi)	29	6	B	2024-12-01
	Line 8	Suzhou	35.6 km (22.1 mi)	28	6	B	2024-09-10
	Line 11	Suzhou	41.27 km (25.64 mi)	28	6	B	2023-06-24
	Line 1	Taiyuan	28.73 km (17.85 mi)	24	6	A	2025-02-22
	Line 2	Taiyuan	23.65 km (14.70 mi)	23	6	A	2020-12-26
	Line S1	Taizhou	52.396 km (32.557 mi)	15	4	D	2022-12-28
	Line 1	Tianjin	42.227 km (26.2 mi)	28	6	B1	1980-08-10
	Line 2	Tianjin	27.157 km (16.875 mi)	20	6	B1	2012-07-01
	Line 3	Tianjin	33.6 km (20.9 mi)	26	6	B1	2012-10-01
	Line 4	Tianjin	19.4 km (12.1 mi)	14	6	B2	2021-12-28
	Line 5	Tianjin	34.8 km (21.6 mi)	28	6	B2	2018-10-22
	Line 6	Tianjin	43.6 km (27.1 mi)	39	6	B2	2016-08-06
	Line 8	Tianjin	13.42 km (8.34 mi)	9	6	A	2021-12-28
	Line 9	Tianjin	52.759 km (32.783 mi)	21	4	B2	2004-03-28
	Line 10	Tianjin	21.18 km (13.16 mi)	21	6	B	2022-11-18
	Line 11	Tianjin	12.27 km (7.62 mi)	11	6	B	2023-12-28
	Line 1	Ürümqi	27.615 km (17.159 mi)	21	6	A	2018-10-25
	Line S1	Wenzhou	53.507 km (33.248 mi)	18	4	D	2019-01-23
	Line S2	Wenzhou	62.945 km (39.112 mi)	20	4	D	2023-08-26
	Line 1	Wuhan	37.936 km (23.572 mi)	32	4	B1	2004-07-28
	Line 2	Wuhan	60.304 km (37.471 mi)	38	6	B1	2012-12-28
	Line 3	Wuhan	29.660 km (18.430 mi)	24	6	B1	2015-12-28
	Line 4	Wuhan	49.693 km (30.878 mi)	37	6	B1	2013-12-28
	Line 5	Wuhan	37.216 km (23.125 mi)	27	6	A	2021-12-26
	Line 6	Wuhan	42.537 km (26.431 mi)	32	6	A	2016-12-28
	Line 7	Wuhan	83.012 km (51.581 mi)	33	6	A	2018-10-01
	Line 8	Wuhan	38.197 km (23.735 mi)	26	6	A	2017-12-26
	Line 11	Wuhan	22.530 km (13.999 mi)	14	6	A	2018-10-01
	Line 16	Wuhan	36.458 km (22.654 mi)	14	4	A	2021-12-26
	Line 19	Wuhan	23.3 km (14.5 mi)	7	6	A	2023-12-30
	Yangluo line	Wuhan	34.575 km (21.484 mi)	16	4	A	2017-12-26
	Line 1	Wuhu	30.46 km (18.93 mi)	25	6	HL	2021-11-03
	Line 2	Wuhu	15.787 km (9.810 mi)	11	4	HL	2021-12-28
	Line 1	Wuxi	65.007 km (40.393 mi)	36	6	B1	2014-07-01
	Line 2	Wuxi	26.3 km (16.3 mi)	21	6	B1	2014-12-28
	Line 3	Wuxi	28.493 km (17.70 mi)	21	6	B	2020-10-28
	Line 4	Wuxi	25.4 km (15.8 mi)	18	6	B	2021-12-17
	Line 1	Xi'an	42.20 km (26.22 mi)	30	6	B2	2013-09-15
	Line 2	Xi'an	33.637 km (20.901 mi)	25	6	B2	2011-09-16
	Line 3	Xi'an	39.15 km (24.33 mi)	26	6	B2	2016-11-08
	Line 4	Xi'an	35.2 km (21.9 mi)	29	6	B2	2018-12-26
	Line 5	Xi'an	41.6 km (25.8 mi)	31	6	B2	2020-12-28
	Line 6	Xi'an	35.1 km (21.8 mi)	30	6	B2	2020-12-28
	Line 9	Xi'an	25.296 km (15.718 mi)	15	6	B2	2020-12-28
	Line 14	Xi'an	42.96 km (26.69 mi)	17	6	B2	2019-09-29
	Line 16	Xi'an	15.03 km (9.34 mi)	9	6	B2	2023-06-27
	Line 1	Xiamen	30.30 km (18.83 mi)	24	6	B2	2017-12-31
	Line 2	Xiamen	41.64 km (25.87 mi)	30	6	B2	2019-12-25
	Line 3	Xiamen	26.52 km (16.48 mi)	21	4	B	2021-06-25
	Line 1	Xuzhou	21.967 km (13.650 mi)	18	6	B	2019-09-28
	Line 2	Xuzhou	24.25 km (15.07 mi)	20	6	B	2020-11-28
	Line 3	Xuzhou	18.13 km (11.27 mi)	16	6	B	2021-06-28
	Line 1	Zhengzhou	41.21 km (25.61 mi)	30	6	B2	2013-12-28
	Line 2	Zhengzhou	30.85 km (19.17 mi)	22	6	B2	2016-08-19
	Line 3	Zhengzhou	31.813 km (19.768 mi)	25	6	A	2020-12-26
	Line 4	Zhengzhou	29.287 km (18.2 mi)	27	6	B	2020-12-26
	Line 5	Zhengzhou	40.4 km (25.1 mi)	32	6	A	2019-05-20
	Line 6	Zhengzhou	16.727 km (10.394 mi)	10	6	A	2022-09-30
	Line 10	Zhengzhou	21.864 km (13.586 mi)	12	6	A	2023-09-28
	Line 12	Zhengzhou	16.538 km (10.276 mi)	11	6	B	2023-12-20
	Line 14	Zhengzhou	7.455 km (4.632 mi)	4	6	B	2019-09-19
	Zhengxu Line	Zhengzhou	67.13 km (41.71 mi)	26	4	B	2023-12-28
	Chengjiao line	Zhengzhou	40.84 km (25.38 mi)	18	6	B2	2017-01-12

=== Under construction ===
- Xiong'an Rail Transit

=== Construction suspended ===
- Baotou Metro
- Hengyang Metro

=== Proposed ===
- Anqing Metro
- Baoji Metro
- Chengde Metro
- Chenzhou Metro
- Chifeng Metro
- Chuzhou Metro
- Datong Metro
- Dazhou Metro
- Ezhou Metro
- Fuxin Metro
- Fuyang Metro
- Ganzhou Metro
- Guangyuan Metro
- Haikou Metro
- Handan Metro
- Heze Metro
- Huainan Metro
- Huizhou Metro
- Huzhou Metro
- Jiaxing Metro
- Jinzhong Metro
- Liaocheng Metro
- Lijiang Metro
- Linyi Metro
- Longyan Metro
- Luzhou Metro
- Ma'anshan Metro
- Mudanjiang Metro
- Nanchong Metro
- Nanyang Metro
- Neijiang Metro
- Putian Metro
- Quanzhou Metro
- Quzhou Metro
- Rizhao Metro
- Sanya Metro
- Shangrao Metro
- Shiyan Metro
- Suqian Metro
- Tangshan Metro
- Tongling Metro
- Weifang Metro
- Weihai Metro
- Weinan Metro
- Wuzhou Metro
- Xiangyang Metro
- Xingtai Metro
- Xining Metro
- Xuancheng Metro
- Yancheng Metro
- Yangzhou Metro
- Yantai Metro
- Yichang Metro
- Yinchuan Metro
- Yulin Metro
- Zhangzhou Metro
- Zhanjiang Metro
- Zhenjiang Metro
- Zhongshan Metro
- Zhuhai Metro
- Zhuzhou Metro
- Zibo Metro
- Zunyi Metro

== Suburban and regional rail ==
Regional, suburban, & commuter rail
Corridor	Type	System & Operator	Location (Provincial-level)	Service terminals	Length	Stations	Opened
Sub-Central	S-train	BCR ( CR Beijing)	Beijing	Liangxiang — Qiaozhuang East	63.7 km (39.6 mi)	6	2017-12-31
S2	S-train	BCR ( CR Beijing)	Beijing & Hebei	Huangtudian — Yanqing / Shacheng	108.3 km (67.3 mi)	6	2008-08-06
Huairou–Miyun	S-train	BCR ( CR Beijing)	Beijing	Beijing North — Gubeikou	144.6 km (89.9 mi)	7	2017-12-31
Tongmi	S-train	BCR ( CR Beijing)	Beijing	Tongzhou West — Miyun North / Huairou North	84.2 km (52.3 mi)	7	2020-06-30
Tianjin–Jizhou	S-train	CR Beijing	Tianjin	Tianjin — Jizhou North	112.60 km (69.97 mi)	9	2015-07-05
Yangda	S-train	CR Beijing	Shanxi	Yangquan North — Yangquan East	45.95 km (28.55 mi)	3	2020-09-24
Yongyu—Shaoxing Urban	S-train	NBIR / SXSR ( CR Shanghai)	Zhejiang	Ningbo — Hangzhou South	144 km (89 mi)	6	2017-06-10
Lianyungang Suburban	S-train	Lianyungang Suburban Railway ( CR Shanghai)	Jiangsu	Lianyungang — Lianyun	35.1 km (21.8 mi)	5	2019-12-30
Haikou Suburban	S-train	Haikou Suburban Railway ( CR Guangzhou)	Hainan	Haikou — Meilan	38.054 km (23.646 mi)	6	2019-07-01
Changji—Jihun	C-train	CR Shenyang	Jilin	Changchun West — Hunchun	482 km (300 mi)	13	2015-09-20
Changbai—Bai'a	C-train	CR Shenyang	Jilin & Inner Mongolia	Changchun — Ulanhot	435 km (270 mi)	18	2017-08-08
Jingjin	C-train	CR Beijing	Beijing & Tianjin	Beijing South — Binhai	165 km (103 mi)	6	2008-08-01
Jingxiong	C-train	CR Beijing	Beijing & Hebei	Beijing West — Daxing Airport	48.224 km (29.965 mi)	3	2019-09-26
Zhengkai	C-train	CR Zhengzhou	Henan	Zhengzhou East — Kaifeng	57 km (35 mi)	4	2014-12-28
Zhengjiao	C-train	CR Zhengzhou	Henan	Zhengzhou — Jiaozuo	77 km (48 mi)	6	2015-06-26
Zhengji	C-train	CR Zhengzhou	Henan	Zhengzhou East — Xinzheng Airport	28 km (17 mi)	2	2015-12-31
Jinshan	C-train	CR Shanghai	Shanghai	Shanghai South — Jinshanwei	56.4 km (35.0 mi)	8	2012-09-28
Wuxiao	C-train	CR Wuhan	Hubei	Hankou — Xiaogan East	61.8 km (38.4 mi)	11	2016-12-01
Wuxian	C-train	CR Wuhan	Hubei	Wuchang — Xianning South	91 km (57 mi)	13	2013-12-28
Wuhuang	C-train	CR Wuhan	Hubei	Wuhan — Daye North / Huanggang East	131 km (81 mi)	14	2014-06-18
Chengguan	C-train	CR Chengdu	Sichuan	Chengdu — Qingchengshan / Pengzhou / Lidui Park	94.2 km (58.5 mi)	13	2010-05-12
Chengpu	C-train	CR Chengdu	Sichuan	Chengdu West — Chaoyanghu	99 km (62 mi)	12	2018-12-28
Guikai	C-train	CR Chengdu	Guizhou	Guiyang North — Kaiyang	62 km (39 mi)	6	2015-05-01
Yuwan	C-train	CR Chengdu	Chongqing	Chongqing North — Wanzhou	247 km (153 mi)	7	2016-11-29
Qingrong	C-train	CR Jinan	Shandong	Qingdao North — Rongcheng	298 km (185 mi)	14	2014-12-29
Guangzhu	C-train	Pearl River Delta intercity railway ( CR Guangzhou)	Guangdong	Guangzhou South — Zhuhai / Xinhui	143 km (89 mi)	22	2011-01-07
Guangfozhao	C-train	Pearl River Delta intercity railway ( CR Guangzhou)	Guangdong	Guangzhou — Zhaoqing	79 km (49 mi)	11	2016-03-30
Guanhui	C-train	Pearl River Delta intercity railway ( CR Guangzhou)	Guangdong	Dongguan West — Xiaojinkou	103.1 km (64.1 mi)	18	2016-03-30
Guangshen	C-train	CR Guangzhou	Guangdong	Guangzhou — Shenzhen	147 km (91 mi)	8	2007-04-18
Suishen	C-train	Pearl River Delta intercity railway ( CR Guangzhou)	Guangdong	Guangzhou East — Shenzhen Airport	97 km (60 mi)	16	2019-12-15
Zhuji	C-train	Pearl River Delta intercity railway ( CR Guangzhou)	Guangdong	Zhuhai — Zhuhai Changlong	16.86 km (10.48 mi)	7	2020-08-18
Xiashen	C-train	CR Guangzhou	Guangdong	Shenzhen North — Shanwei	156 km (97 mi)	6	2013-12-28
Changzhutan	C-train	CR Guangzhou	Hunan	Changsha West — Zhuzhou South / Xiangtan	97 km (60 mi)	21	2016-12-26
Lanzhong	C-train	CR Lanzhou	Gansu	Lanzhou West — Zhongchuan Airport	61 km (38 mi)	6	2015-09-30

== Tram and light rail ==
Legend

- In operation.
- Under test run.

Tram and light rail systems
System	Locale	Length	Stations	Opened
Trams in Beijing (Xijiao line and Yizhuang T1 line)	Beijing	20.762 km (12.901 mi)	20	2017-12-30
Changchun Tram	Changchun	12.759 km (7.928 mi)	24	1941-11-01
Changchun Rail Transit (Note: The same system also combined metro system)	Changchun	68.2 km (42.4 mi)	62	2002-10-30
Line 2 (Chengdu Tram)	Chengdu	39.3 km (24.4 mi)	35	2018-12-26
Bishan SkyShuttle	Chongqing	15.4 km (9.6 mi)	15	2021-04-16
Dalian Tram	Dalian	23.4 km (14.5 mi)	37	1909-09-25
Nanhai tram	Foshan	14.345 km (8.914 mi)	15	2021-08-18
Guangzhou Trams (Haizhu Tram and Huangpu Tram Line 1)	Guangzhou	22.0 km (13.7 mi)	30	2014-12-31
Huai'an Tram	Huai'an	20.07 km (12.47 mi)	23	2015-12-28
Huangshi Rail Transit	Huangshi	26.88 km (16.70 mi)	28	2022-12-28
Honghe tram	Mengzi	13.3 km (8.3 mi)	15	2020-10-01
Jiaxing Tram	Jiaxing	13.8 km (8.6 mi)	16	2021-06-25
Nanjing Tram	Nanjing	16.86 km (10.48 mi)	26	2014-08-01
Qingdao Tram	Qingdao	8.77 km (5.45 mi)	12	2016-03-05
Sanya Tram	Sanya	8.37 km (5.20 mi)	15	2019-01-01
Shanghai Songjiang Tram	Shanghai	31.394 km (19.507 mi)	45	2018-12-26
Shenyang Tram	Shenyang	65 km (40 mi)	85	2013-08-31
Shenzhen Tram	Shenzhen	11.683 km (7.259 mi)	20	2017-10-28
Suzhou Tram	Suzhou	44.36 km (27.56 mi)	27	2014-10-26
Tianshui Tram	Tianshui	12.926 km (8.0 mi)	11	2020-05-01
Wenshan Tram	Qiubei	13.960 km (8.7 mi)	10	2021-05-15
Trams in Wuhan	Wuhan	53.9 km (33.5 mi)	61	2017-07-28
Wuyi Tram	Wuyi New Area (Nanping)	26.185 km (16.271 mi)	6	2022-01-01
Chongli Tram	Zhangjiakou	1.6 km (0.99 mi)	6	2022-02-04

=== Defunct systems ===
- Gaoming tram
- TEDA Modern Tram
- Zhuhai Tram
- Shanghai Zhangjiang Tram

=== Under construction ===
- Baoshan Tram
- Dujiangyan Tram
- Delingha Modern Tram
- Guiyang Tram
- Lijiang Tram
- Turpan Tram
- Xi'an High-tech Zone Tram
- Zhangye Danxia Tram

== Monorail and maglev ==
Monorail/maglev systems (Note: Systems listed here may also be listed as rapid transit.)
System	Locale	Length	Stations	Opened
Line S1 (Beijing Subway)	Beijing	10.2 km (6.3 mi)	8	2017-12-30
Changsha Maglev Express	Changsha	18.55 km (11.5 mi)	3	2016-05-06
Chongqing Rail Transit (Line 2 and Line 3)	Chongqing	96.5 km (60.0 mi)	68	2004-11-06
Fenghuang Maglev	Fenghuang County	9.121 km (5.7 mi)	4	2022-07-30
Liupanshui Tourism Monorail	Liupanshui	11.0 km (6.8 mi)	6	2019-??-??
Shanghai maglev train	Shanghai	29.86 km (18.6 mi)	2	2002-12-31
Wuhu Rail Transit	Wuhu	46.2 km (28.7 mi)	35	2021-11-03
Xishui County Tourist Train	Xishui County	11.5 km (7.1 mi)	6	2020-??-??
Yinchuan Flower Expo Park Cloud Rail	Yinchuan	5.7 km (3.5 mi)	8	2017-??-??
Optics Valley Suspended Monorail Line	Wuhan	10 km (6.2 mi)	6	2023-09-23
Qingyuan Maglev	Qingyuan	8.014 km (5.0 mi)	3	2025-01-25

=== Under Construction ===
- Enshi Prefecture Tourism Rail Transit
- Guang'an Metro
- Guilin Rail Transit
- Jining Rail Transit
- Anyang Rail Transit
- Shantou Metro
- Liuzhou Rail Transit
- Bengbu Rail Transit

== Summary ==
=== Provincial statistics ===
RT systems among Provincial-level administrative divisions
Province	System(s)	#	Length (km)
BJ	Beijing	1	836.0
TJ	Tianjin	1	309.9
HE	Shijiazhuang	1	76.5
SX	Taiyuan	1	23.7
NM	Hohhot	1	49.0
LN	Dalian, Shenyang	2	400.8
JL	Changchun	1	111.2
HL	Harbin	1	83.7
SH	Shanghai, Maglev line	2	831.0
JS	Nanjing, Suzhou, Wuxi, Changzhou, Xuzhou, Nantong	6	1034.5
ZJ	Hangzhou, Ningbo, Wenzhou, Shaoxing, Hanghai line, Jinhua, Taizhou	7	1077.2
AH	Hefei, Ningchu line, Wuhu	3	294.3
FJ	Fuzhou, Xiamen	2	237.4
JX	Nanchang	1	128.4
SD	Qingdao, Jinan	2	402.2
HA	Zhengzhou, Luoyang	2	388.3
HB	Wuhan	1	486.0
HN	Changsha, Maglev line	2	226.4
GD	Guangzhou, Shenzhen, Foshan, Dongguan	4	1358.6
GX	Nanning	1	127.9
HI			
CQ	Chongqing	1	520.3
SC	Chengdu	1	561.6
GZ	Guiyang	1	118.7
YN	Kunming	1	184.1
XZ			
SN	Xi'an	1	311.0
GS	Lanzhou	1	35.0
QH			
NX			
XJ	Ürümqi	1	27.6

=== List of rapid transit systems by province ===
==== Anhui ====
System	Information		Currently operational	Currently under construction	Map	Ref.
Hefei Metro 合肥地铁	Locale	Hefei	1 2 3 4 5 6 8	7 S1		
Hefei Metro 合肥地铁	Began operation	26 December 2016	1 2 3 4 5 6 8	7 S1		
Hefei Metro 合肥地铁	Lines in operation	6	1 2 3 4 5 6 8	7 S1		
Hefei Metro 合肥地铁	No. of stations	184	1 2 3 4 5 6 8	7 S1		
Hefei Metro 合肥地铁	Network length	232 km (144 mi)	1 2 3 4 5 6 8	7 S1		
Hefei Metro 合肥地铁	Ridership	1,230,200 (31 December 2020 record). 179.8 million (2019)	1 2 3 4 5 6 8	7 S1		
Wuhu Rail Transit 芜湖轨道交通	Locale	Wuhu	1 2			
Wuhu Rail Transit 芜湖轨道交通	Began operation	3 November 2021	1 2			
Wuhu Rail Transit 芜湖轨道交通	Lines in operation	2	1 2			
Wuhu Rail Transit 芜湖轨道交通	No. of stations	35	1 2			
Wuhu Rail Transit 芜湖轨道交通	Network length	46.25 km (29 mi)	1 2			
Wuhu Rail Transit 芜湖轨道交通	Ridership	N/A	1 2			

==== Beijing-Tianjin-Hebei ====
System	Information		Currently operational	Currently under construction	Map	Ref.
Beijing Subway (BGD) 北京地铁	Locale	Beijing & Langfang	1 2 3 4 5 6 7 8 9 10 11 12 13 14 15 16 17 18 19 24 25N 25S 26 27 34 35	1 Military section renovation and branch 3 East extension 13 Realignment; 18 Realignment; 19 North extension 22; 25S branch line 28; 35 North extension		
Beijing Subway (BGD) 北京地铁	Began operation	1 October 1969	1 2 3 4 5 6 7 8 9 10 11 12 13 14 15 16 17 18 19 24 25N 25S 26 27 34 35	1 Military section renovation and branch 3 East extension 13 Realignment; 18 Realignment; 19 North extension 22; 25S branch line 28; 35 North extension		
Beijing Subway (BGD) 北京地铁	Lines in operation	25	1 2 3 4 5 6 7 8 9 10 11 12 13 14 15 16 17 18 19 24 25N 25S 26 27 34 35	1 Military section renovation and branch 3 East extension 13 Realignment; 18 Realignment; 19 North extension 22; 25S branch line 28; 35 North extension		
Beijing Subway (BGD) 北京地铁	No. of stations	369 (List)	1 2 3 4 5 6 7 8 9 10 11 12 13 14 15 16 17 18 19 24 25N 25S 26 27 34 35	1 Military section renovation and branch 3 East extension 13 Realignment; 18 Realignment; 19 North extension 22; 25S branch line 28; 35 North extension		
Beijing Subway (BGD) 北京地铁	Network length	785.7 km (488.2 mi) (Note: Both Xijiao Line and Yizhuang T1 line are light rail lines and are not fully grade separated.)	1 2 3 4 5 6 7 8 9 10 11 12 13 14 15 16 17 18 19 24 25N 25S 26 27 34 35	1 Military section renovation and branch 3 East extension 13 Realignment; 18 Realignment; 19 North extension 22; 25S branch line 28; 35 North extension		
Beijing Subway (BGD) 北京地铁	Ridership	10,824,301 (2019 daily avg.); 13,738,800 (12 July 2019 record). 3,950.9 million (2019).	1 2 3 4 5 6 7 8 9 10 11 12 13 14 15 16 17 18 19 24 25N 25S 26 27 34 35	1 Military section renovation and branch 3 East extension 13 Realignment; 18 Realignment; 19 North extension 22; 25S branch line 28; 35 North extension		
Shijiazhuang Metro 石家庄地铁	Locale	Shijiazhuang	1 2 3	1 Phase 2 & Phase 3; 4; 5; 6		
Shijiazhuang Metro 石家庄地铁	Began operation	26 June 2017	1 2 3	1 Phase 2 & Phase 3; 4; 5; 6		
Shijiazhuang Metro 石家庄地铁	Lines in operation	3	1 2 3	1 Phase 2 & Phase 3; 4; 5; 6		
Shijiazhuang Metro 石家庄地铁	No. of stations	60 (List)	1 2 3	1 Phase 2 & Phase 3; 4; 5; 6		
Shijiazhuang Metro 石家庄地铁	Network length	76.5 km (47.5 mi)	1 2 3	1 Phase 2 & Phase 3; 4; 5; 6		
Shijiazhuang Metro 石家庄地铁	Ridership	479,900 (31 December 2020 record). 95.7 million (2019).	1 2 3	1 Phase 2 & Phase 3; 4; 5; 6		
Tianjin Metro 天津地铁	Locale	Tianjin	1 2 3 4 5 6 7 8 9 10 11 Z4	4 Middle Section; 7 Northern Section; 8 Phase 1 (Urban section) & Phase 2; 11 Western Section; B1; Z2; Z4 Southern Section		
Tianjin Metro 天津地铁	Began operation	30 September 2003 (10 August 1980 old system)	1 2 3 4 5 6 7 8 9 10 11 Z4	4 Middle Section; 7 Northern Section; 8 Phase 1 (Urban section) & Phase 2; 11 Western Section; B1; Z2; Z4 Southern Section		
Tianjin Metro 天津地铁	Lines in operation	11	1 2 3 4 5 6 7 8 9 10 11 Z4	4 Middle Section; 7 Northern Section; 8 Phase 1 (Urban section) & Phase 2; 11 Western Section; B1; Z2; Z4 Southern Section		
Tianjin Metro 天津地铁	No. of stations	233 (List)	1 2 3 4 5 6 7 8 9 10 11 Z4	4 Middle Section; 7 Northern Section; 8 Phase 1 (Urban section) & Phase 2; 11 Western Section; B1; Z2; Z4 Southern Section		
Tianjin Metro 天津地铁	Network length	326.5 km (202.9 mi)	1 2 3 4 5 6 7 8 9 10 11 Z4	4 Middle Section; 7 Northern Section; 8 Phase 1 (Urban section) & Phase 2; 11 Western Section; B1; Z2; Z4 Southern Section		
Tianjin Metro 天津地铁	Ridership	1,869,000 (31 December 2019 record). 523.5 million (2019).	1 2 3 4 5 6 7 8 9 10 11 Z4	4 Middle Section; 7 Northern Section; 8 Phase 1 (Urban section) & Phase 2; 11 Western Section; B1; Z2; Z4 Southern Section		

==== Chongqing-Sichuan ====
System	Information		Currently operational	Currently under construction	Map	Ref.
Chengdu Metro 成都地铁	Locale	Chengdu	1 2 3 4 5 6 7 8 9 10 13 17 18 19 27 30	10 Phase 3; 18 Phase 3 S5; S11		
Chengdu Metro 成都地铁	Began operation	27 September 2010	1 2 3 4 5 6 7 8 9 10 13 17 18 19 27 30	10 Phase 3; 18 Phase 3 S5; S11		
Chengdu Metro 成都地铁	Lines in operation	12	1 2 3 4 5 6 7 8 9 10 13 17 18 19 27 30	10 Phase 3; 18 Phase 3 S5; S11		
Chengdu Metro 成都地铁	No. of stations	387 (List)	1 2 3 4 5 6 7 8 9 10 13 17 18 19 27 30	10 Phase 3; 18 Phase 3 S5; S11		
Chengdu Metro 成都地铁	Network length	633.6 km (393.7 mi)	1 2 3 4 5 6 7 8 9 10 13 17 18 19 27 30	10 Phase 3; 18 Phase 3 S5; S11		
Chengdu Metro 成都地铁	Ridership	5,649,500 (daily record); 1398 million (2019 annual)	1 2 3 4 5 6 7 8 9 10 13 17 18 19 27 30	10 Phase 3; 18 Phase 3 S5; S11		
Chongqing Rail Transit (CRT) Chongqing Metro 重庆轨道交通	Locale	Chongqing	Loop 1 2 3 4 5 6 9 10 18 Bitong	4 Western extension; 7; 15; 17; 18 Northern extension; 24; 27; Yongchuan		
Chongqing Rail Transit (CRT) Chongqing Metro 重庆轨道交通	Began operation	6 November 2004	Loop 1 2 3 4 5 6 9 10 18 Bitong	4 Western extension; 7; 15; 17; 18 Northern extension; 24; 27; Yongchuan		
Chongqing Rail Transit (CRT) Chongqing Metro 重庆轨道交通	Lines in operation	12	Loop 1 2 3 4 5 6 9 10 18 Bitong	4 Western extension; 7; 15; 17; 18 Northern extension; 24; 27; Yongchuan		
Chongqing Rail Transit (CRT) Chongqing Metro 重庆轨道交通	No. of stations	312 (List)	Loop 1 2 3 4 5 6 9 10 18 Bitong	4 Western extension; 7; 15; 17; 18 Northern extension; 24; 27; Yongchuan		
Chongqing Rail Transit (CRT) Chongqing Metro 重庆轨道交通	Network length	561.18 km (349 mi)	Loop 1 2 3 4 5 6 9 10 18 Bitong	4 Western extension; 7; 15; 17; 18 Northern extension; 24; 27; Yongchuan		
Chongqing Rail Transit (CRT) Chongqing Metro 重庆轨道交通	Ridership	3,872,000 (peak day); 2,846,356 (daily avg.); 1038.9 million (2019)	Loop 1 2 3 4 5 6 9 10 18 Bitong	4 Western extension; 7; 15; 17; 18 Northern extension; 24; 27; Yongchuan		

==== Fujian ====
System	Information		Currently operational	Currently under construction	Map	Ref.
Fuzhou Metro 福州地铁	Locale	Fuzhou	1 2 4 5 6 Binhai Express	2 Eastern extension 6 Southern extension		
Fuzhou Metro 福州地铁	Began operation	18 May 2016	1 2 4 5 6 Binhai Express	2 Eastern extension 6 Southern extension		
Fuzhou Metro 福州地铁	Lines in operation	6	1 2 4 5 6 Binhai Express	2 Eastern extension 6 Southern extension		
Fuzhou Metro 福州地铁	No. of stations	102	1 2 4 5 6 Binhai Express	2 Eastern extension 6 Southern extension		
Fuzhou Metro 福州地铁	Network length	210.3 km (131 mi)	1 2 4 5 6 Binhai Express	2 Eastern extension 6 Southern extension		
Fuzhou Metro 福州地铁	Ridership	1,480,600 (31 December 2025 Record); 314.963 million (2025 annual)	1 2 4 5 6 Binhai Express	2 Eastern extension 6 Southern extension		
Xiamen Metro (AMTR) 厦门地铁	Locale	Xiamen	1 2 3 4 6	3 Phase 2 & Southern extension 4 Phase 2; 6 Eastern extension 9; 7 R1		
Xiamen Metro (AMTR) 厦门地铁	Began operation	31 December 2017	1 2 3 4 6	3 Phase 2 & Southern extension 4 Phase 2; 6 Eastern extension 9; 7 R1		
Xiamen Metro (AMTR) 厦门地铁	Lines in operation	5	1 2 3 4 6	3 Phase 2 & Southern extension 4 Phase 2; 6 Eastern extension 9; 7 R1		
Xiamen Metro (AMTR) 厦门地铁	No. of stations	92	1 2 3 4 6	3 Phase 2 & Southern extension 4 Phase 2; 6 Eastern extension 9; 7 R1		
Xiamen Metro (AMTR) 厦门地铁	Network length	157.9 km (98.1 mi)	1 2 3 4 6	3 Phase 2 & Southern extension 4 Phase 2; 6 Eastern extension 9; 7 R1		
Xiamen Metro (AMTR) 厦门地铁	Ridership	1,121,400 (31 December 2025 Record); 275.904 million (2025 annual)	1 2 3 4 6	3 Phase 2 & Southern extension 4 Phase 2; 6 Eastern extension 9; 7 R1		

==== Gansu ====
System	Information		Currently operational	Currently under construction	Map	Ref.
Lanzhou Metro 兰州轨道交通	Locale	Lanzhou	1 2	3; 4; 5		
Lanzhou Metro 兰州轨道交通	Began operation	23 June 2019	1 2	3; 4; 5		
Lanzhou Metro 兰州轨道交通	Lines in operation	2	1 2	3; 4; 5		
Lanzhou Metro 兰州轨道交通	No. of stations	27	1 2	3; 4; 5		
Lanzhou Metro 兰州轨道交通	Network length	34.96 km (21.7 mi)	1 2	3; 4; 5		
Lanzhou Metro 兰州轨道交通	Ridership	301,300 (1 October 2020 Record); 32.4 million (2019 annual)	1 2	3; 4; 5		

==== Guangdong ====
System	Information		Currently operational	Currently under construction	Map	Ref.
Dongguan Rail Transit Dongguan Metro 东莞轨道交通	Locale	Dongguan	2	1; 2 Phase 3		
Dongguan Rail Transit Dongguan Metro 东莞轨道交通	Began operation	27 May 2016	2	1; 2 Phase 3		
Dongguan Rail Transit Dongguan Metro 东莞轨道交通	Lines in operation	1	2	1; 2 Phase 3		
Dongguan Rail Transit Dongguan Metro 东莞轨道交通	No. of stations	15	2	1; 2 Phase 3		
Dongguan Rail Transit Dongguan Metro 东莞轨道交通	Network length	37.743 km (23 mi)	2	1; 2 Phase 3		
Dongguan Rail Transit Dongguan Metro 东莞轨道交通	Ridership	300,300 (1 October 2019 record). 53.6 million (2019).	2	1; 2 Phase 3		
Foshan Metro (FMetro) 佛山地铁	Locale	Foshan & Guangzhou	1 2 3	3 Southern extension 4; 11		
Foshan Metro (FMetro) 佛山地铁	Began operation	3 November 2010	1 2 3	3 Southern extension 4; 11		
Foshan Metro (FMetro) 佛山地铁	Lines in operation	3	1 2 3	3 Southern extension 4; 11		
Foshan Metro (FMetro) 佛山地铁	No. of stations	61 (List)	1 2 3	3 Southern extension 4; 11		
Foshan Metro (FMetro) 佛山地铁	Network length	112.7 km (70 mi)	1 2 3	3 Southern extension 4; 11		
Foshan Metro (FMetro) 佛山地铁	Ridership	677,900 (31 December 2020 record).	1 2 3	3 Southern extension 4; 11		
Guangzhou Metro 广州地铁	Locale	Guangzhou	1 2 3 4 5 6 7 8 9 10 11 12 13 14 18 21 22 APM Guangfo	8 Northern extension 10 Eastern section 12 Middle section 13 Phase 2; 14 Mainline Phase 2; 18 Northern and Southern Extension; 22 Northern Extension; 24		
Guangzhou Metro 广州地铁	Began operation	28 June 1997	1 2 3 4 5 6 7 8 9 10 11 12 13 14 18 21 22 APM Guangfo	8 Northern extension 10 Eastern section 12 Middle section 13 Phase 2; 14 Mainline Phase 2; 18 Northern and Southern Extension; 22 Northern Extension; 24		
Guangzhou Metro 广州地铁	Lines in operation	19	1 2 3 4 5 6 7 8 9 10 11 12 13 14 18 21 22 APM Guangfo	8 Northern extension 10 Eastern section 12 Middle section 13 Phase 2; 14 Mainline Phase 2; 18 Northern and Southern Extension; 22 Northern Extension; 24		
Guangzhou Metro 广州地铁	No. of stations	398 (List)	1 2 3 4 5 6 7 8 9 10 11 12 13 14 18 21 22 APM Guangfo	8 Northern extension 10 Eastern section 12 Middle section 13 Phase 2; 14 Mainline Phase 2; 18 Northern and Southern Extension; 22 Northern Extension; 24		
Guangzhou Metro 广州地铁	Network length	779.9 km (484.6 mi)	1 2 3 4 5 6 7 8 9 10 11 12 13 14 18 21 22 APM Guangfo	8 Northern extension 10 Eastern section 12 Middle section 13 Phase 2; 14 Mainline Phase 2; 18 Northern and Southern Extension; 22 Northern Extension; 24		
Guangzhou Metro 广州地铁	Ridership	11,569,400 (31 December 2019 record). 3305.9 million (2019 annual)	1 2 3 4 5 6 7 8 9 10 11 12 13 14 18 21 22 APM Guangfo	8 Northern extension 10 Eastern section 12 Middle section 13 Phase 2; 14 Mainline Phase 2; 18 Northern and Southern Extension; 22 Northern Extension; 24		
Shenzhen Metro 深圳地铁	Locale	Shenzhen	1 2 3 4 5; 6 6B 7 8 9; 10 11 12 13 14 16 20	3 East Ext; 5 West Ext; 6B phase 2; 7 phase 2; 8 phase 3; 11 phase 2; 12 phase 2; 13 South and North Ext; 15; 16 phase 2; 17; 19; 20 South Ext; 22; 25; 27; 29; 32		
Shenzhen Metro 深圳地铁	Began operation	28 December 2004	1 2 3 4 5; 6 6B 7 8 9; 10 11 12 13 14 16 20	3 East Ext; 5 West Ext; 6B phase 2; 7 phase 2; 8 phase 3; 11 phase 2; 12 phase 2; 13 South and North Ext; 15; 16 phase 2; 17; 19; 20 South Ext; 22; 25; 27; 29; 32		
Shenzhen Metro 深圳地铁	Lines in operation	17	1 2 3 4 5; 6 6B 7 8 9; 10 11 12 13 14 16 20	3 East Ext; 5 West Ext; 6B phase 2; 7 phase 2; 8 phase 3; 11 phase 2; 12 phase 2; 13 South and North Ext; 15; 16 phase 2; 17; 19; 20 South Ext; 22; 25; 27; 29; 32		
Shenzhen Metro 深圳地铁	No. of stations	421 (List)	1 2 3 4 5; 6 6B 7 8 9; 10 11 12 13 14 16 20	3 East Ext; 5 West Ext; 6B phase 2; 7 phase 2; 8 phase 3; 11 phase 2; 12 phase 2; 13 South and North Ext; 15; 16 phase 2; 17; 19; 20 South Ext; 22; 25; 27; 29; 32		
Shenzhen Metro 深圳地铁	Network length	622 km (386 mi)	1 2 3 4 5; 6 6B 7 8 9; 10 11 12 13 14 16 20	3 East Ext; 5 West Ext; 6B phase 2; 7 phase 2; 8 phase 3; 11 phase 2; 12 phase 2; 13 South and North Ext; 15; 16 phase 2; 17; 19; 20 South Ext; 22; 25; 27; 29; 32		
Shenzhen Metro 深圳地铁	Ridership	7,708,300 (31 December 2010). 2017.6 million (2019 annual)	1 2 3 4 5; 6 6B 7 8 9; 10 11 12 13 14 16 20	3 East Ext; 5 West Ext; 6B phase 2; 7 phase 2; 8 phase 3; 11 phase 2; 12 phase 2; 13 South and North Ext; 15; 16 phase 2; 17; 19; 20 South Ext; 22; 25; 27; 29; 32		

==== Guangxi ====
System	Information		Currently operational	Currently under construction	Map	Ref.
Nanning Metro 南宁地铁	Locale	Nanning	1 2 3 4 5	4 Eastern extension 6		
Nanning Metro 南宁地铁	Began operation	28 June 2016	1 2 3 4 5	4 Eastern extension 6		
Nanning Metro 南宁地铁	Lines in operation	5	1 2 3 4 5	4 Eastern extension 6		
Nanning Metro 南宁地铁	No. of stations	93	1 2 3 4 5	4 Eastern extension 6		
Nanning Metro 南宁地铁	Network length	128.2 km (80 mi)	1 2 3 4 5	4 Eastern extension 6		
Nanning Metro 南宁地铁	Ridership	1,432,600 (1 January 2021 record). 273.3 million (2019).	1 2 3 4 5	4 Eastern extension 6		

==== Guizhou ====
System	Information		Currently operational	Currently under construction	Map	Ref.
Guiyang Metro (GYURT) 贵阳地铁（贵阳轨道交通）	Locale	Guiyang	1 2 3 S1			
Guiyang Metro (GYURT) 贵阳地铁（贵阳轨道交通）	Began operation	28 December 2017	1 2 3 S1			
Guiyang Metro (GYURT) 贵阳地铁（贵阳轨道交通）	Lines in operation	4	1 2 3 S1			
Guiyang Metro (GYURT) 贵阳地铁（贵阳轨道交通）	No. of stations	93	1 2 3 S1			
Guiyang Metro (GYURT) 贵阳地铁（贵阳轨道交通）	Network length	149 km (92.6 mi)	1 2 3 S1			
Guiyang Metro (GYURT) 贵阳地铁（贵阳轨道交通）	Ridership	183,000 (2 December 2018 record). 50.6 million (2019).	1 2 3 S1			

==== Heilongjiang ====
System	Information		Currently operational	Currently under construction	Map	Ref.
Harbin Metro 哈尔滨地铁	Locale	Harbin	1 2 3			
Harbin Metro 哈尔滨地铁	Began operation	26 September 2013	1 2 3			
Harbin Metro 哈尔滨地铁	Lines in operation	3	1 2 3			
Harbin Metro 哈尔滨地铁	No. of stations	62	1 2 3			
Harbin Metro 哈尔滨地铁	Network length	79.4 km (49 mi)	1 2 3			
Harbin Metro 哈尔滨地铁	Ridership	392,400 (31 December 2019). 103.2 million (2019).	1 2 3			

==== Henan ====
System	Information		Currently operational	Currently under construction	Map	Ref.
Luoyang Subway 洛阳地铁	Locale	Luoyang	1 2	N/A		
Luoyang Subway 洛阳地铁	Began operation	28 March 2021	1 2	N/A		
Luoyang Subway 洛阳地铁	Lines in operation	2	1 2	N/A		
Luoyang Subway 洛阳地铁	No. of stations	33	1 2	N/A		
Luoyang Subway 洛阳地铁	Network length	43.558 km (27 mi)	1 2	N/A		
Luoyang Subway 洛阳地铁	Ridership		1 2	N/A		
Zhengzhou Metro 郑州地铁	Locale	Zhengzhou	1 2 3 4 5 6 7 8 10 12 14 Chengjiao Zhengxu	10 Phase 2		
Zhengzhou Metro 郑州地铁	Began operation	28 December 2013	1 2 3 4 5 6 7 8 10 12 14 Chengjiao Zhengxu	10 Phase 2		
Zhengzhou Metro 郑州地铁	Lines in operation	8	1 2 3 4 5 6 7 8 10 12 14 Chengjiao Zhengxu	10 Phase 2		
Zhengzhou Metro 郑州地铁	No. of stations	143	1 2 3 4 5 6 7 8 10 12 14 Chengjiao Zhengxu	10 Phase 2		
Zhengzhou Metro 郑州地铁	Network length	232.5 km (144 mi)	1 2 3 4 5 6 7 8 10 12 14 Chengjiao Zhengxu	10 Phase 2		
Zhengzhou Metro 郑州地铁	Ridership	2,221,760 (31 December 2020 record). 411.2 million (2019).	1 2 3 4 5 6 7 8 10 12 14 Chengjiao Zhengxu	10 Phase 2		

==== Hubei ====
System	Information		Currently operational	Currently under construction	Map	Ref.
Wuhan Metro 武汉地铁	Locale	Wuhan	1 2 3 4 5; 6 7 8 11 16 19 Yangluo	3 Southern extension 6 Southwest extension 10; 11 Western extension 12; Yangluo Western extension		
Wuhan Metro 武汉地铁	Began operation	28 July 2004	1 2 3 4 5; 6 7 8 11 16 19 Yangluo	3 Southern extension 6 Southwest extension 10; 11 Western extension 12; Yangluo Western extension		
Wuhan Metro 武汉地铁	Lines in operation	11	1 2 3 4 5; 6 7 8 11 16 19 Yangluo	3 Southern extension 6 Southwest extension 10; 11 Western extension 12; Yangluo Western extension		
Wuhan Metro 武汉地铁	No. of stations	255 (List)	1 2 3 4 5; 6 7 8 11 16 19 Yangluo	3 Southern extension 6 Southwest extension 10; 11 Western extension 12; Yangluo Western extension		
Wuhan Metro 武汉地铁	Network length	460.944 km (286 mi)	1 2 3 4 5; 6 7 8 11 16 19 Yangluo	3 Southern extension 6 Southwest extension 10; 11 Western extension 12; Yangluo Western extension		
Wuhan Metro 武汉地铁	Ridership	1229 million (2019 annual); 4,456,200 (4 April 2019 Peak)	1 2 3 4 5; 6 7 8 11 16 19 Yangluo	3 Southern extension 6 Southwest extension 10; 11 Western extension 12; Yangluo Western extension		

==== Hunan ====
System	Information		Currently operational	Currently under construction	Map	Ref.
Changsha Maglev Express 长沙磁浮快线	Locale	Changsha	Maglev	Maglev Eastern extension		
Changsha Maglev Express 长沙磁浮快线	Began operation	6 May 2016	Maglev	Maglev Eastern extension		
Changsha Maglev Express 长沙磁浮快线	Lines in operation	1	Maglev	Maglev Eastern extension		
Changsha Maglev Express 长沙磁浮快线	No. of stations	3	Maglev	Maglev Eastern extension		
Changsha Maglev Express 长沙磁浮快线	Network length	18.55 km (12 mi)	Maglev	Maglev Eastern extension		
Changsha Maglev Express 长沙磁浮快线	Ridership		Maglev	Maglev Eastern extension		
Changsha Metro 长沙地铁	Locale	Changsha	1 2 3 4 5 6	1 Northern extension 2 Western extension 4 Northern extension 5 Southern extension 6 Eastern extension 7		
Changsha Metro 长沙地铁	Began operation	29 April 2014	1 2 3 4 5 6	1 Northern extension 2 Western extension 4 Northern extension 5 Southern extension 6 Eastern extension 7		
Changsha Metro 长沙地铁	Lines in operation	6	1 2 3 4 5 6	1 Northern extension 2 Western extension 4 Northern extension 5 Southern extension 6 Eastern extension 7		
Changsha Metro 长沙地铁	No. of stations	135	1 2 3 4 5 6	1 Northern extension 2 Western extension 4 Northern extension 5 Southern extension 6 Eastern extension 7		
Changsha Metro 长沙地铁	Network length	207.9 km (129.2 mi)	1 2 3 4 5 6	1 Northern extension 2 Western extension 4 Northern extension 5 Southern extension 6 Eastern extension 7		
Changsha Metro 长沙地铁	Ridership	2,656,900 (31 December 2020 record). 378.2 million (2020).	1 2 3 4 5 6	1 Northern extension 2 Western extension 4 Northern extension 5 Southern extension 6 Eastern extension 7		

==== Inner Mongolia ====
System	Information		Currently operational	Currently under construction	Map	Ref.
Hohhot Metro 呼和浩特地铁	Locale	Hohhot	1 2	N/A		
Hohhot Metro 呼和浩特地铁	Began operation	29 December 2019	1 2	N/A		
Hohhot Metro 呼和浩特地铁	Lines in operation	2	1 2	N/A		
Hohhot Metro 呼和浩特地铁	No. of stations	43	1 2	N/A		
Hohhot Metro 呼和浩特地铁	Network length	49.039 km (30.5 mi)	1 2	N/A		
Hohhot Metro 呼和浩特地铁	Ridership	239,400 (31 December 2020 record). 0.2 million (2019).	1 2	N/A		

==== Jiangxi ====
System	Information		Currently operational	Currently under construction	Map	Ref.
Nanchang Metro 南昌地铁	Locale	Nanchang	1 2 3 4			
Nanchang Metro 南昌地铁	Began operation	26 December 2015	1 2 3 4			
Nanchang Metro 南昌地铁	Lines in operation	4	1 2 3 4			
Nanchang Metro 南昌地铁	No. of stations	103	1 2 3 4			
Nanchang Metro 南昌地铁	Network length	128.3 km (80 mi)	1 2 3 4			
Nanchang Metro 南昌地铁	Ridership	1,447,000 (31 December 2020 record). 174.9 million (2019).	1 2 3 4			

==== Jilin ====
System	Information		Currently operational	Currently under construction	Map	Ref.
Changchun Rail Transit 长春轨道交通	Locale	Changchun	1 2 3 4 6 8	1 South extension 2 Eastern extension 3 South extension 5; 7; 9		
Changchun Rail Transit 长春轨道交通	Began operation	30 October 2002	1 2 3 4 6 8	1 South extension 2 Eastern extension 3 South extension 5; 7; 9		
Changchun Rail Transit 长春轨道交通	Lines in operation	5	1 2 3 4 6 8	1 South extension 2 Eastern extension 3 South extension 5; 7; 9		
Changchun Rail Transit 长春轨道交通	No. of stations	93	1 2 3 4 6 8	1 South extension 2 Eastern extension 3 South extension 5; 7; 9		
Changchun Rail Transit 长春轨道交通	Network length	111.2 km (69 mi)	1 2 3 4 6 8	1 South extension 2 Eastern extension 3 South extension 5; 7; 9		
Changchun Rail Transit 长春轨道交通	Ridership	938,000 (20 December 2019). 213.9 million (2019 annual)	1 2 3 4 6 8	1 South extension 2 Eastern extension 3 South extension 5; 7; 9		

==== Liaoning ====
System	Information		Currently operational	Currently under construction	Map	Ref.
Dalian Metro 大连地铁	Locale	Dalian	1 2 3 5 12 13	4; 7; 13 Southern extension		
Dalian Metro 大连地铁	Began operation	8 November 2002	1 2 3 5 12 13	4; 7; 13 Southern extension		
Dalian Metro 大连地铁	Lines in operation	6	1 2 3 5 12 13	4; 7; 13 Southern extension		
Dalian Metro 大连地铁	No. of stations	99 (List)	1 2 3 5 12 13	4; 7; 13 Southern extension		
Dalian Metro 大连地铁	Network length	237.74 km (148 mi)	1 2 3 5 12 13	4; 7; 13 Southern extension		
Dalian Metro 大连地铁	Ridership	724,900 (7 August 2019 record). 203.9 million (2019).	1 2 3 5 12 13	4; 7; 13 Southern extension		
Shenyang Metro 沈阳地铁	Locale	Shenyang	1 2 3 4 9 10	3 Eastern extension 6; 9 Eastern extension 10 Southwestern extension		
Shenyang Metro 沈阳地铁	Began operation	27 September 2010	1 2 3 4 9 10	3 Eastern extension 6; 9 Eastern extension 10 Southwestern extension		
Shenyang Metro 沈阳地铁	Lines in operation	4	1 2 3 4 9 10	3 Eastern extension 6; 9 Eastern extension 10 Southwestern extension		
Shenyang Metro 沈阳地铁	No. of stations	85 (List)	1 2 3 4 9 10	3 Eastern extension 6; 9 Eastern extension 10 Southwestern extension		
Shenyang Metro 沈阳地铁	Network length	115.9 km (72 mi)	1 2 3 4 9 10	3 Eastern extension 6; 9 Eastern extension 10 Southwestern extension		
Shenyang Metro 沈阳地铁	Ridership	1,375,300 (15 November 2019 record). 358.6 million (2019).	1 2 3 4 9 10	3 Eastern extension 6; 9 Eastern extension 10 Southwestern extension		

==== Shaanxi ====
System	Information		Currently operational	Currently under construction	Map	Ref.
Xi'an Metro 西安地铁	Locale	Xi'an & Xianyang	1 2 3 4 5 6 8 9 10 14 16	15		
Xi'an Metro 西安地铁	Began operation	16 September 2011	1 2 3 4 5 6 8 9 10 14 16	15		
Xi'an Metro 西安地铁	Lines in operation	9	1 2 3 4 5 6 8 9 10 14 16	15		
Xi'an Metro 西安地铁	No. of stations	184	1 2 3 4 5 6 8 9 10 14 16	15		
Xi'an Metro 西安地铁	Network length	300.4 km (187 mi)	1 2 3 4 5 6 8 9 10 14 16	15		
Xi'an Metro 西安地铁	Ridership	4,073,041 (31 December 2020). 945.4 (2019 annual).	1 2 3 4 5 6 8 9 10 14 16	15		

==== Shandong ====
System	Information		Currently operational	Currently under construction	Map	Ref.
Jinan Metro 济南地铁	Locale	Jinan	1 2 3	4; 6; 7; 8; 9		
Jinan Metro 济南地铁	Began operation	1 April 2019	1 2 3	4; 6; 7; 8; 9		
Jinan Metro 济南地铁	Lines in operation	3	1 2 3	4; 6; 7; 8; 9		
Jinan Metro 济南地铁	No. of stations	40	1 2 3	4; 6; 7; 8; 9		
Jinan Metro 济南地铁	Network length	84.25 km (52 mi)	1 2 3	4; 6; 7; 8; 9		
Jinan Metro 济南地铁	Ridership	66,800 (31 December 2020 record). 5.75 million (2019).	1 2 3	4; 6; 7; 8; 9		
Qingdao Metro 青岛地铁	Locale	Qingdao	1 2 3 4 6 8 Oceantec Valley West Coast	2 Phases 1 & 2 adjustments 5; 6 Phase 2; 7; 8 South Section & branch 9; 15		
Qingdao Metro 青岛地铁	Began operation	16 December 2015	1 2 3 4 6 8 Oceantec Valley West Coast	2 Phases 1 & 2 adjustments 5; 6 Phase 2; 7; 8 South Section & branch 9; 15		
Qingdao Metro 青岛地铁	Lines in operation	7	1 2 3 4 6 8 Oceantec Valley West Coast	2 Phases 1 & 2 adjustments 5; 6 Phase 2; 7; 8 South Section & branch 9; 15		
Qingdao Metro 青岛地铁	No. of stations	146	1 2 3 4 6 8 Oceantec Valley West Coast	2 Phases 1 & 2 adjustments 5; 6 Phase 2; 7; 8 South Section & branch 9; 15		
Qingdao Metro 青岛地铁	Network length	315.86 km (196.3 mi)	1 2 3 4 6 8 Oceantec Valley West Coast	2 Phases 1 & 2 adjustments 5; 6 Phase 2; 7; 8 South Section & branch 9; 15		
Qingdao Metro 青岛地铁	Ridership	(2 May 2021 record). 187.5 million (2019).	1 2 3 4 6 8 Oceantec Valley West Coast	2 Phases 1 & 2 adjustments 5; 6 Phase 2; 7; 8 South Section & branch 9; 15		

==== Shanghai-Jiangsu-Zhejiang ====
System	Information		Currently operational	Currently under construction	Map	Ref.
Changzhou Metro 常州地铁	Locale	Changzhou	1 2	5 6		
Changzhou Metro 常州地铁	Began operation	21 September 2019	1 2	5 6		
Changzhou Metro 常州地铁	Lines in operation	2	1 2	5 6		
Changzhou Metro 常州地铁	No. of stations	43	1 2	5 6		
Changzhou Metro 常州地铁	Network length	54.03 km (34 mi)	1 2	5 6		
Changzhou Metro 常州地铁	Ridership	243,000 (31 October 2019 record). 10.3 million (2019).	1 2	5 6		
Hangzhou Metro 杭州地铁	Locale	Hangzhou	1 2 3 4 5 6 7 8 9 10 16 19 Hanghai	3 Eastern extension 4 Western & Southern extensions 9 Northern extension 10 Northern extension 12; 15; 18; Hangde Phase 1		
Hangzhou Metro 杭州地铁	Began operation	24 November 2012	1 2 3 4 5 6 7 8 9 10 16 19 Hanghai	3 Eastern extension 4 Western & Southern extensions 9 Northern extension 10 Northern extension 12; 15; 18; Hangde Phase 1		
Hangzhou Metro 杭州地铁	Lines in operation	12	1 2 3 4 5 6 7 8 9 10 16 19 Hanghai	3 Eastern extension 4 Western & Southern extensions 9 Northern extension 10 Northern extension 12; 15; 18; Hangde Phase 1		
Hangzhou Metro 杭州地铁	No. of stations	270 (List)	1 2 3 4 5 6 7 8 9 10 16 19 Hanghai	3 Eastern extension 4 Western & Southern extensions 9 Northern extension 10 Northern extension 12; 15; 18; Hangde Phase 1		
Hangzhou Metro 杭州地铁	Network length	516.2 km (321 mi)	1 2 3 4 5 6 7 8 9 10 16 19 Hanghai	3 Eastern extension 4 Western & Southern extensions 9 Northern extension 10 Northern extension 12; 15; 18; Hangde Phase 1		
Hangzhou Metro 杭州地铁	Ridership	3,141,400 (31 December 2020 record). 634 million (2019).	1 2 3 4 5 6 7 8 9 10 16 19 Hanghai	3 Eastern extension 4 Western & Southern extensions 9 Northern extension 10 Northern extension 12; 15; 18; Hangde Phase 1		
Jinhua Rail Transit 金华轨道交通	Locale	Jinhua	Jinyi Yidong	N/A		
Jinhua Rail Transit 金华轨道交通	Began operation	30 August 2022	Jinyi Yidong	N/A		
Jinhua Rail Transit 金华轨道交通	Lines in operation	2	Jinyi Yidong	N/A		
Jinhua Rail Transit 金华轨道交通	No. of stations	30	Jinyi Yidong	N/A		
Jinhua Rail Transit 金华轨道交通	Network length	106.45 km (66 mi)	Jinyi Yidong	N/A		
Jinhua Rail Transit 金华轨道交通	Ridership	N/A	Jinyi Yidong	N/A		
Nanjing Metro 南京地铁	Locale	Nanjing	1 2 3 4 5 7 10 S1 S3 S4 S6 S7 S8 S9	3 Phase 3; 4 Phase 2; 6; 8; 9; 10 Phases 2 & 3; 11; 12; 13; S2; S4 Nanjing section S5		
Nanjing Metro 南京地铁	Began operation	3 September 2005	1 2 3 4 5 7 10 S1 S3 S4 S6 S7 S8 S9	3 Phase 3; 4 Phase 2; 6; 8; 9; 10 Phases 2 & 3; 11; 12; 13; S2; S4 Nanjing section S5		
Nanjing Metro 南京地铁	Lines in operation	13	1 2 3 4 5 7 10 S1 S3 S4 S6 S7 S8 S9	3 Phase 3; 4 Phase 2; 6; 8; 9; 10 Phases 2 & 3; 11; 12; 13; S2; S4 Nanjing section S5		
Nanjing Metro 南京地铁	No. of stations	201 (List)	1 2 3 4 5 7 10 S1 S3 S4 S6 S7 S8 S9	3 Phase 3; 4 Phase 2; 6; 8; 9; 10 Phases 2 & 3; 11; 12; 13; S2; S4 Nanjing section S5		
Nanjing Metro 南京地铁	Network length	498.66 km (310 mi)	1 2 3 4 5 7 10 S1 S3 S4 S6 S7 S8 S9	3 Phase 3; 4 Phase 2; 6; 8; 9; 10 Phases 2 & 3; 11; 12; 13; S2; S4 Nanjing section S5		
Nanjing Metro 南京地铁	Ridership	4,219,000 (31 December 2020 record). 1151.9 million (2019).	1 2 3 4 5 7 10 S1 S3 S4 S6 S7 S8 S9	3 Phase 3; 4 Phase 2; 6; 8; 9; 10 Phases 2 & 3; 11; 12; 13; S2; S4 Nanjing section S5		
Nantong Rail Transit 南通轨道交通	Locale	Nantong	1 2	1 South extension		
Nantong Rail Transit 南通轨道交通	Began operation	10 November 2022	1 2	1 South extension		
Nantong Rail Transit 南通轨道交通	Lines in operation	1	1 2	1 South extension		
Nantong Rail Transit 南通轨道交通	No. of stations	28	1 2	1 South extension		
Nantong Rail Transit 南通轨道交通	Network length	39.182 km (24 mi)	1 2	1 South extension		
Nantong Rail Transit 南通轨道交通	Ridership	N/A	1 2	1 South extension		
Ningbo Rail Transit Ningbo Metro 宁波轨道交通	Locale	Ningbo	1 2 3 4 5 8	3 Phase 2; 5 Phase 2; 6; 7; 10; 12		
Ningbo Rail Transit Ningbo Metro 宁波轨道交通	Began operation	30 May 2014	1 2 3 4 5 8	3 Phase 2; 5 Phase 2; 6; 7; 10; 12		
Ningbo Rail Transit Ningbo Metro 宁波轨道交通	Lines in operation	6	1 2 3 4 5 8	3 Phase 2; 5 Phase 2; 6; 7; 10; 12		
Ningbo Rail Transit Ningbo Metro 宁波轨道交通	No. of stations	116	1 2 3 4 5 8	3 Phase 2; 5 Phase 2; 6; 7; 10; 12		
Ningbo Rail Transit Ningbo Metro 宁波轨道交通	Network length	185.36 km (115.18 mi)	1 2 3 4 5 8	3 Phase 2; 5 Phase 2; 6; 7; 10; 12		
Ningbo Rail Transit Ningbo Metro 宁波轨道交通	Ridership	1,014,600 (31 December 2020 record). 167.2 million (2019).	1 2 3 4 5 8	3 Phase 2; 5 Phase 2; 6; 7; 10; 12		
Shanghai Maglev Train (SMT) 上海磁浮示范运营线	Locale	Shanghai	Maglev	N/A		
Shanghai Maglev Train (SMT) 上海磁浮示范运营线	Began operation	31 December 2002	Maglev	N/A		
Shanghai Maglev Train (SMT) 上海磁浮示范运营线	Lines in operation	1	Maglev	N/A		
Shanghai Maglev Train (SMT) 上海磁浮示范运营线	No. of stations	2	Maglev	N/A		
Shanghai Maglev Train (SMT) 上海磁浮示范运营线	Network length	29.863 km (19 mi)	Maglev	N/A		
Shanghai Maglev Train (SMT) 上海磁浮示范运营线	Ridership		Maglev	N/A		
Shanghai Metro 上海地铁	Locale	Shanghai (and Kunshan)	1 2 3 4 5 6 7 8 9 10 11 12 13 14 15 16 17 18 Pujiang	2 Western extension 12 Western extension 13 Western & eastern extensions 15 Southern extension 18 Northern extension 19; 20; 21; 22; 23		
Shanghai Metro 上海地铁	Began operation	28 May 1993	1 2 3 4 5 6 7 8 9 10 11 12 13 14 15 16 17 18 Pujiang	2 Western extension 12 Western extension 13 Western & eastern extensions 15 Southern extension 18 Northern extension 19; 20; 21; 22; 23		
Shanghai Metro 上海地铁	Lines in operation	19	1 2 3 4 5 6 7 8 9 10 11 12 13 14 15 16 17 18 Pujiang	2 Western extension 12 Western extension 13 Western & eastern extensions 15 Southern extension 18 Northern extension 19; 20; 21; 22; 23		
Shanghai Metro 上海地铁	No. of stations	508 (List)	1 2 3 4 5 6 7 8 9 10 11 12 13 14 15 16 17 18 Pujiang	2 Western extension 12 Western extension 13 Western & eastern extensions 15 Southern extension 18 Northern extension 19; 20; 21; 22; 23		
Shanghai Metro 上海地铁	Network length	808 km (502.1 mi)	1 2 3 4 5 6 7 8 9 10 11 12 13 14 15 16 17 18 Pujiang	2 Western extension 12 Western extension 13 Western & eastern extensions 15 Southern extension 18 Northern extension 19; 20; 21; 22; 23		
Shanghai Metro 上海地铁	Ridership	13,294,400 (8 March 2019 record). 3880.1 million (2019).	1 2 3 4 5 6 7 8 9 10 11 12 13 14 15 16 17 18 Pujiang	2 Western extension 12 Western extension 13 Western & eastern extensions 15 Southern extension 18 Northern extension 19; 20; 21; 22; 23		
Shaoxing Metro 绍兴轨道交通	Locale	Shaoxing	1 2	2 Phase 2 4		
Shaoxing Metro 绍兴轨道交通	Began operation	28 June 2021	1 2	2 Phase 2 4		
Shaoxing Metro 绍兴轨道交通	Lines in operation	2	1 2	2 Phase 2 4		
Shaoxing Metro 绍兴轨道交通	No. of stations	36	1 2	2 Phase 2 4		
Shaoxing Metro 绍兴轨道交通	Network length	57.83 km (36 mi)	1 2	2 Phase 2 4		
Shaoxing Metro 绍兴轨道交通	Ridership		1 2	2 Phase 2 4		
Suzhou Metro 苏州轨道交通	Locale	Suzhou	1 2 3 4 5 6 7 8 11	2 North Extension; 4 North Extension; 7 North Extension; 10		
Suzhou Metro 苏州轨道交通	Began operation	28 April 2012	1 2 3 4 5 6 7 8 11	2 North Extension; 4 North Extension; 7 North Extension; 10		
Suzhou Metro 苏州轨道交通	Lines in operation	6	1 2 3 4 5 6 7 8 11	2 North Extension; 4 North Extension; 7 North Extension; 10		
Suzhou Metro 苏州轨道交通	No. of stations	181 (List)	1 2 3 4 5 6 7 8 11	2 North Extension; 4 North Extension; 7 North Extension; 10		
Suzhou Metro 苏州轨道交通	Network length	249.47 km (155 mi)	1 2 3 4 5 6 7 8 11	2 North Extension; 4 North Extension; 7 North Extension; 10		
Suzhou Metro 苏州轨道交通	Ridership	1,548,000 (2 May 2019 record). 363 million (2019).	1 2 3 4 5 6 7 8 11	2 North Extension; 4 North Extension; 7 North Extension; 10		
Taizhou Rail Transit 台州轨道交通	Locale	Taizhou	S1	S2		
Taizhou Rail Transit 台州轨道交通	Began operation	28 December 2022	S1	S2		
Taizhou Rail Transit 台州轨道交通	Lines in operation	1	S1	S2		
Taizhou Rail Transit 台州轨道交通	No. of stations	15	S1	S2		
Taizhou Rail Transit 台州轨道交通	Network length	52.566 km (33 mi)	S1	S2		
Taizhou Rail Transit 台州轨道交通	Ridership	N/A	S1	S2		
Wenzhou Rail Transit 温州轨道交通	Locale	Wenzhou	S1 S2	S3		
Wenzhou Rail Transit 温州轨道交通	Began operation	23 January 2019	S1 S2	S3		
Wenzhou Rail Transit 温州轨道交通	Lines in operation	1	S1 S2	S3		
Wenzhou Rail Transit 温州轨道交通	No. of stations	18	S1 S2	S3		
Wenzhou Rail Transit 温州轨道交通	Network length	53.507 km (33 mi)	S1 S2	S3		
Wenzhou Rail Transit 温州轨道交通	Ridership	71,800 (1 December 2020 not free record). 7.75 million (2019).	S1 S2	S3		
Wuxi Metro 无锡地铁	Locale	Wuxi	1 2 3 4 S1	2 Extension; 3 Extension; 4 Extension; 5; 6 S2		
Wuxi Metro 无锡地铁	Began operation	1 July 2014	1 2 3 4 S1	2 Extension; 3 Extension; 4 Extension; 5; 6 S2		
Wuxi Metro 无锡地铁	Lines in operation	4	1 2 3 4 S1	2 Extension; 3 Extension; 4 Extension; 5; 6 S2		
Wuxi Metro 无锡地铁	No. of stations	80	1 2 3 4 S1	2 Extension; 3 Extension; 4 Extension; 5; 6 S2		
Wuxi Metro 无锡地铁	Network length	114.8 km (71 mi)	1 2 3 4 S1	2 Extension; 3 Extension; 4 Extension; 5; 6 S2		
Wuxi Metro 无锡地铁	Ridership	526,900 (19 December 2020 record). 109.5 million (2019).	1 2 3 4 S1	2 Extension; 3 Extension; 4 Extension; 5; 6 S2		
Xuzhou Metro 徐州地铁	Locale	Xuzhou	1 2 3; 6	4; 5		
Xuzhou Metro 徐州地铁	Began operation	28 September 2019	1 2 3; 6	4; 5		
Xuzhou Metro 徐州地铁	Lines in operation	4	1 2 3; 6	4; 5		
Xuzhou Metro 徐州地铁	No. of stations	70	1 2 3; 6	4; 5		
Xuzhou Metro 徐州地铁	Network length	95.44 km (59 mi)	1 2 3; 6	4; 5		
Xuzhou Metro 徐州地铁	Ridership	829,100 (20 Sep 2025 record). 109 million (2024).	1 2 3; 6	4; 5		

==== Shanxi ====
System	Information		Currently operational	Currently under construction	Map	Ref.
Taiyuan Metro 太原轨道交通	Locale	Taiyuan	1 2	1 South extension		
Taiyuan Metro 太原轨道交通	Began operation	26 December 2020	1 2	1 South extension		
Taiyuan Metro 太原轨道交通	Lines in operation	2	1 2	1 South extension		
Taiyuan Metro 太原轨道交通	No. of stations	47	1 2	1 South extension		
Taiyuan Metro 太原轨道交通	Network length	52.38 km (33 mi)	1 2	1 South extension		
Taiyuan Metro 太原轨道交通	Ridership	599,500 (highest record on 31 December 2025).	1 2	1 South extension		

==== Xinjiang ====
System	Information		Currently operational	Currently under construction	Map	Ref.
Ürümqi Metro 乌鲁木齐地铁	Locale	Ürümqi	1 Airport MRT	2; 3; 4		
Ürümqi Metro 乌鲁木齐地铁	Began operation	25 October 2018	1 Airport MRT	2; 3; 4		
Ürümqi Metro 乌鲁木齐地铁	Lines in operation	1	1 Airport MRT	2; 3; 4		
Ürümqi Metro 乌鲁木齐地铁	No. of stations	21	1 Airport MRT	2; 3; 4		
Ürümqi Metro 乌鲁木齐地铁	Network length	27.615 km (17 mi)	1 Airport MRT	2; 3; 4		
Ürümqi Metro 乌鲁木齐地铁	Ridership	124,667 (13 October 2019 record). 25.57 million (2019).	1 Airport MRT	2; 3; 4		

==== Yunnan ====
System	Information		Currently operational	Currently under construction	Map	Ref.
Kunming Metro 昆明地铁	Locale	Kunming	1 2 3 4 5 6	1 Northwestern extension 2 Phase 2		
Kunming Metro 昆明地铁	Began operation	28 June 2012	1 2 3 4 5 6	1 Northwestern extension 2 Phase 2		
Kunming Metro 昆明地铁	Lines in operation	6	1 2 3 4 5 6	1 Northwestern extension 2 Phase 2		
Kunming Metro 昆明地铁	No. of stations	103	1 2 3 4 5 6	1 Northwestern extension 2 Phase 2		
Kunming Metro 昆明地铁	Network length	164.3 km (102 mi)	1 2 3 4 5 6	1 Northwestern extension 2 Phase 2		
Kunming Metro 昆明地铁	Ridership	811,800 (30 September 2020 record). 214.1 million (2019).	1 2 3 4 5 6	1 Northwestern extension 2 Phase 2		

== See also ==
- Rapid transit in Taiwan
- Trams in China
- Autonomous Rail Rapid Transit in China
- List of tram and light rail transit systems
- List of town tramway systems in Asia
- List of rapid transit systems
- List of trolleybus systems
