= Line 3 (Changchun Rail Transit) =

Light rail line in China

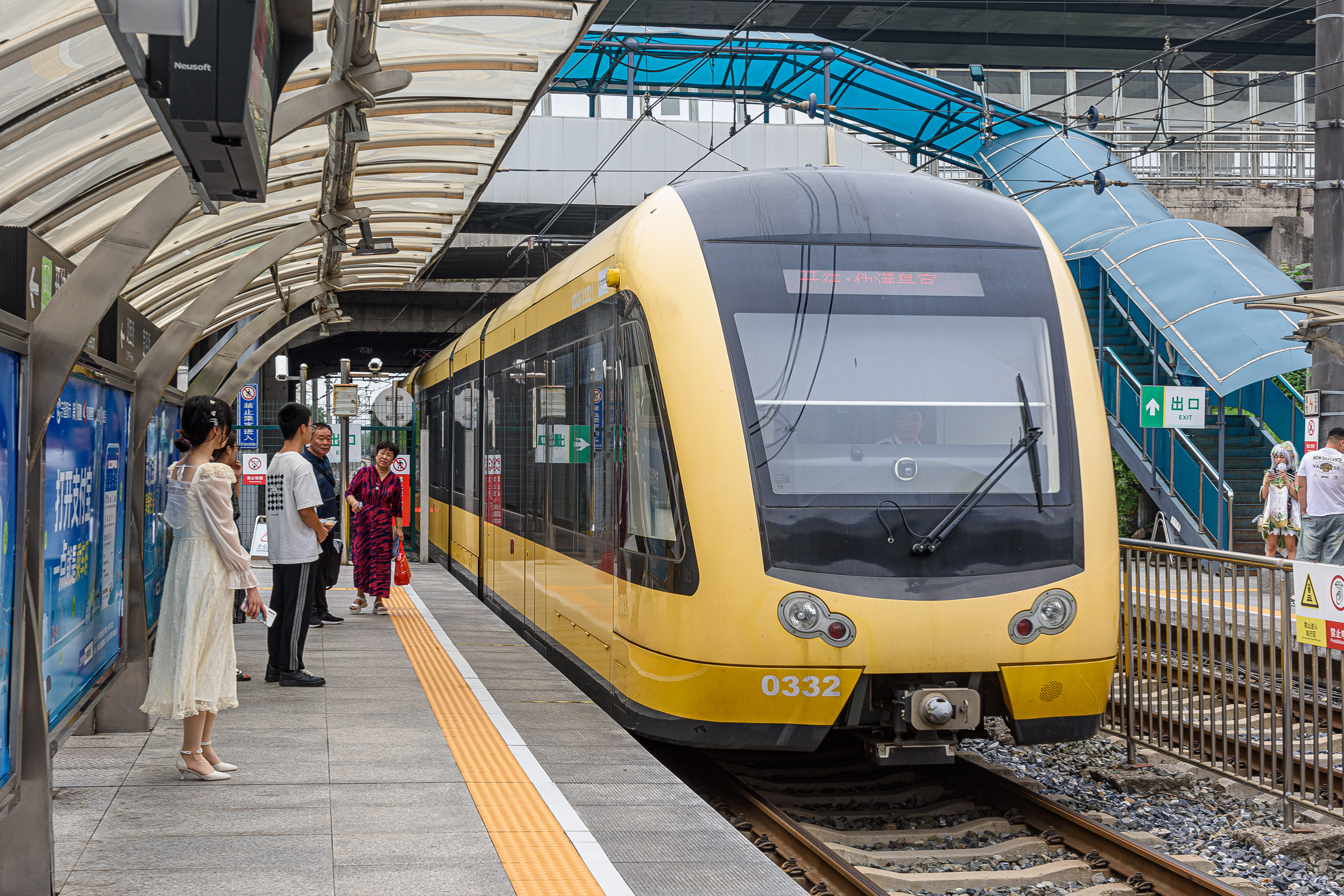
- A train entering Kuanping Bridge station

Overview
- Status: Operational
- Owner: Changchun
- Locale: Changchun, Jilin, China
- Termini: Weimanhuanggong; Changchun Movie Wonderland
- Stations: 34

Service
- Type: Light rail
- System: Changchun Rail Transit
- Services: 2
- Operator: Changchun Rail Transit Corporation
- Depot(s): Huguang Road Depot; Ski Resort Depot
- Rolling stock: Changchun Light Rail:3000/3500 Stock/4000 Stock

History
- Opened: 30 October 2002; 23 years ago

Technical
- Line length: 34.3 km (21.31 mi)
- Number of tracks: 2
- Character: Underground, at-grade and elevated
- Track gauge: 1,435 mm (4 ft 8 1/2 in)
- Electrification: Overhead line, 750 V DC
- Operating speed: 70 km/h

Line 3 of the Changchun Rail Transit (Chinese: 长春轨道交通3号线; pinyin: Chángchūn Guǐdào Jiāotōng Sān Hào Xiàn) is a light rail line running from northwest to southeast Changchun. It was opened on 30 October 2002. Line 3 was later extended on 26 December 2006 and 31 December 2021. This line is currently 34.3 km (21.3 mi) long with 34 stations in operation.

== Opening timeline ==
Segment	Commencement	Length	Station(s)	Name
Changchun Railway Station — Weiguang Street	30 October 2002	14.9 km (9.26 mi)	17	Phase 1
Weixing Square — Changchun Movie Wonderland	26 December 2006	17.0 km (10.56 mi)	16	Phase 2
Weiguang Street — Weixing Square	3 April 2007		n/a	connection of Phase 1 and 2
Furong Bridge	28 November 2017		-1	(temporary closure)
Changchun Railway Station — Huxi Bridge	8 March 2021		-6	(temporary closure)
Huxi Bridge — Weimanhuanggong	31 December 2021	2.4 km (1.49 mi)	6	East extension
Xi'an Bridge	12 May 2023		1	infill stations resumed
Furong Bridge	30 May 2023		1	infill stations resumed

During the temporary closure of Changchun Railway Station — Huxi Bridge section, Liaoning Road station has permanently abandoned due to original station being too close to new Furong Bridge Station and new Changchun Railway Station, became the second case in China where a rapid transit station abandoned after Xinhualu of Tianjin line 1 on 9 December 2001.

== Future development ==
A southern extension from Changchun Movie Wonderland to No.59 Middle School is under construction.

== Stations ==
Service route	Station name		Connections	Distance km		Location
Service route	English	Chinese	Connections	Station	Total	Location
●	Weimanhuanggong	伪满皇宫	4	—N/a	0.00	Kuancheng / Nanguan
●	Dongguangchang	东广场		1.30	1.30	Kuancheng
●	Changchun Railway Station	长春站	CJ ~ JH CB ~ BA CCT; 1	1.20	2.50	Kuancheng
●	Furong Bridge	芙蓉桥		1.40	3.90	Kuancheng / Luyuan
●	Xi'an Bridge	西安桥		1.20	5.10	Chaoyang / Luyuan
●	Nanchang Road	南昌路		0.65	5.75	Chaoyang / Luyuan
●	Chaoyang Bridge	朝阳桥		0.65	6.40	Chaoyang / Luyuan
●	Jiefang Overpass	解放桥	2	1.00	7.40	Chaoyang / Luyuan
●	Huxi Bridge	湖西桥		0.90	8.30	Chaoyang
●	Kuanping Bridge	宽平桥	Trams 54 and 55	0.95	9.25	Chaoyang
●	Fusong Road	抚松路		1.05	10.30	Chaoyang
●	Mengjiatun	孟家屯	CET 7	0.90	11.20	Chaoyang
	at-grade crossing (Huguang Road)					Chaoyang
●	Huguang Road	湖光路		0.85	12.05	Chaoyang
●	Diantai Street	电台街	5	1.60	13.65	Chaoyang
●	Qianjinxi	前进西		0.70	14.35	Chaoyang
●	Qianjin Street	前进大街		0.50	14.85	Chaoyang
	at-grade crossing (Weiming Street)					Chaoyang
●	Weiming Street	卫明街		0.75	15.60	Chaoyang
●	Weiguang Street	卫光街		1.05	16.65	Chaoyang / Nanguan
	at-grade crossing (Weiguang Street)					Chaoyang / Nanguan
●	Weixing Square	卫星广场	1	0.65	17.30	Chaoyang / Nanguan
●	Yatai Overpass	亚泰立交桥		1.25	18.90	Nanguan
●	Yitong River	伊通河		0.85	19.75	Nanguan
●	Vocational Institute of Technology	职业学院	4	1.35	21.10	Nanguan
●	Jilin TV & Radio Center	吉林广电		1.05	22.15	Nanguan
●	Conference & Exhibition Center	会展中心		0.90	23.05	Nanguan
●	Shiji Square	世纪广场		1.10	24.15	Nanguan
●	Jinxin Street	金鑫街		1.55	25.70	Nanguan
●	Boshuo Road	博硕路		0.85	26.55	Nanguan
●	Jinhe Street	金河街		1.20	27.75	Nanguan
●	Agricultural Expo Garden	农博园		0.95	28.70	Nanguan
●	Jingyuetan National Park	净月潭公园		1.30	30.00	Nanguan
●	Zishan Road	紫杉路		1.50	31.50	Nanguan
●	Baoxiang Street	宝相街		1.00	32.50	Nanguan
●	Ski Resort	滑雪场		1.25	33.75	Nanguan
	at-grade crossing (Liuying Dong(East) Road)					Nanguan
●	Changchun Movie Wonderland	长影世纪城	6	0.55	34.30	Nanguan

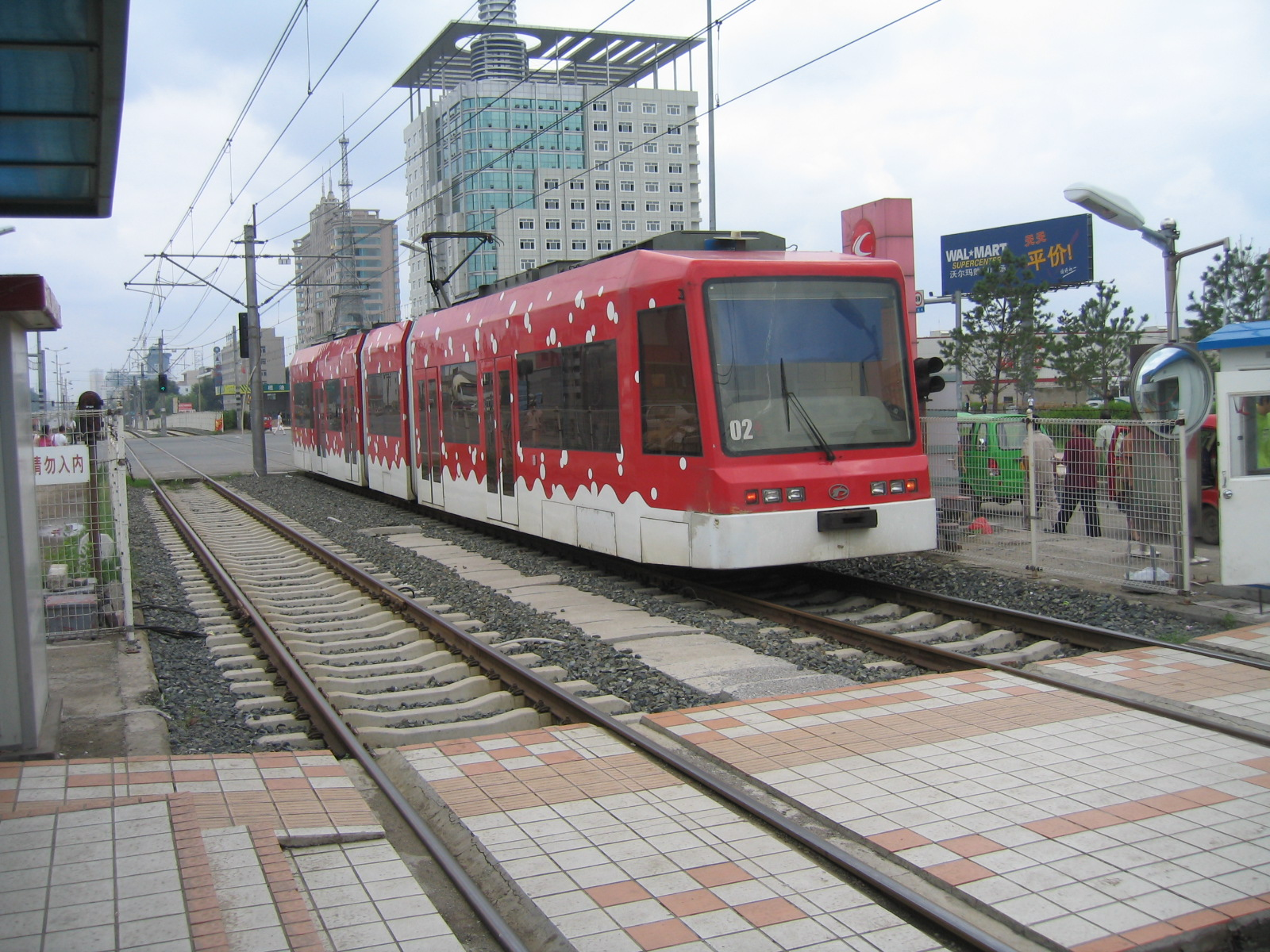
Xiangtan Electric Q6W-1 class at Qianjinxi Station (2005)

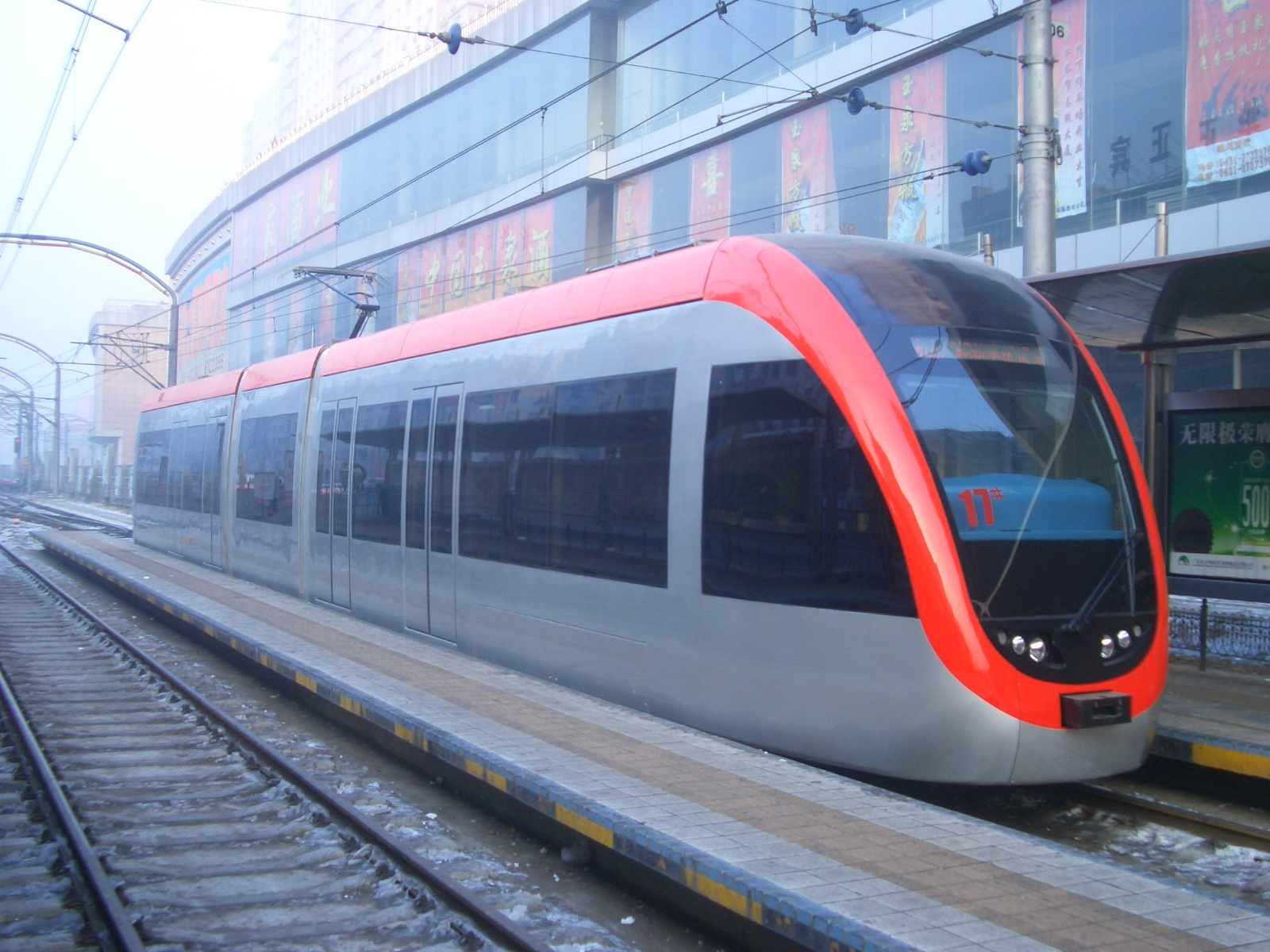
Tangshan class at Changchun Railway Station (2006)

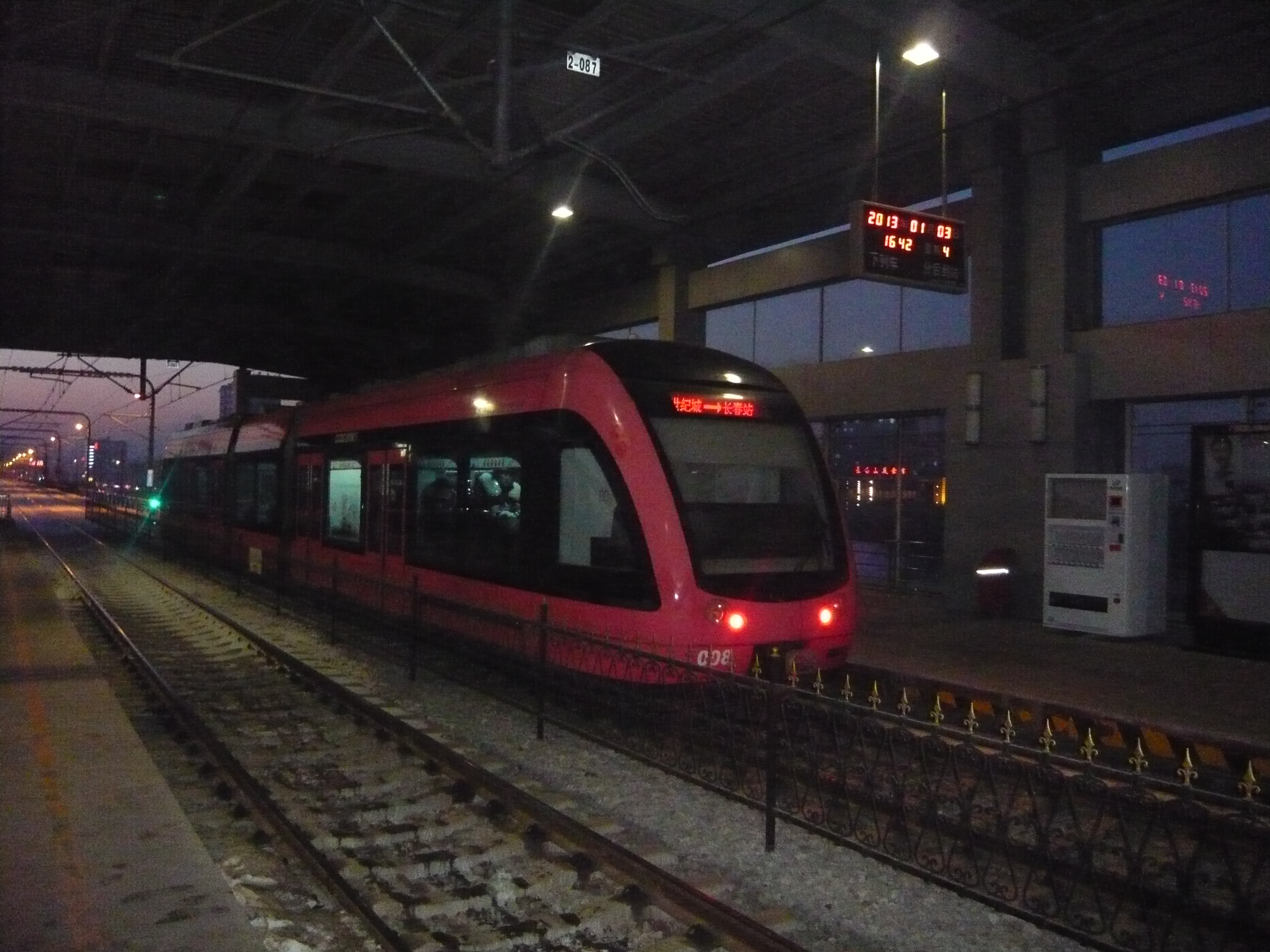
2000 class at Jilin TV & Radio Center Station (2012)

== See also ==
- Changchun Rail Transit
