= Line 2 (Changchun Rail Transit) =

Metro line in Changchun, China

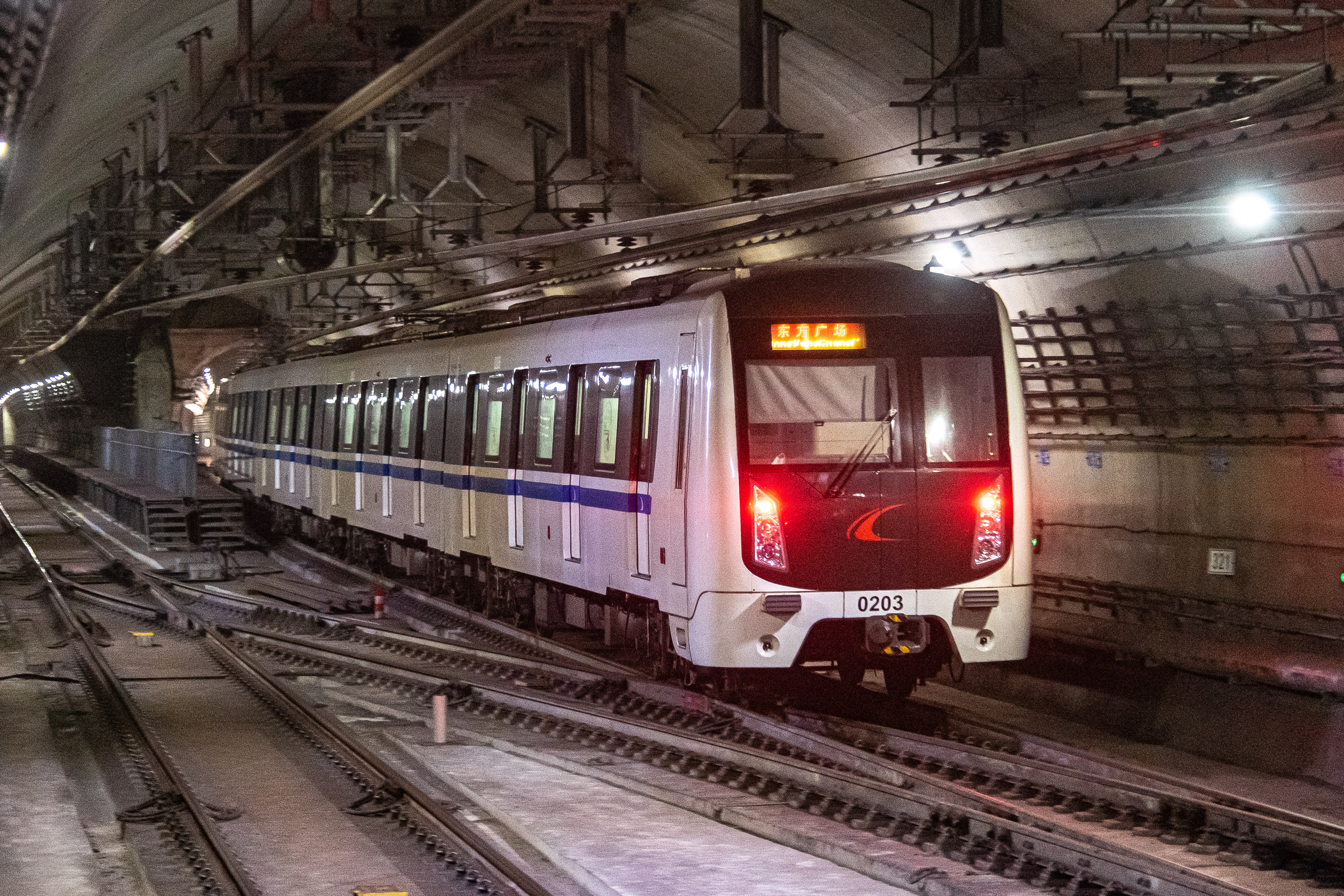
- Line 2 train departing from Jiefang Ave. Station

Overview
- Status: Operational
- Owner: Changchun
- Locale: Changchun, Jilin, China
- Termini: Qiche Gongyuan; Wukaihe Dajie
- Stations: 27

Service
- Type: Rapid transit
- System: Changchun Rail Transit
- Services: 1
- Operator: Changchun Rail Transit Corporation

History
- Opened: 30 August 2018; 8 years ago

Technical
- Line length: 24.9 km (15.47 mi)
- Number of tracks: 2
- Character: Underground
- Track gauge: 1,435 mm (4 ft 8 1/2 in)

Line 2 of the Changchun Rail Transit (Chinese: 长春轨道交通2号线; pinyin: Chángchūn Guǐdào Jiāotōng Èr Hào Xiàn) is a rapid transit line running from west to east Changchun.

== History ==
=== Phase 1 ===
Phase 1 of Line 2 started operation on 30 August 2018. It is 20.5 km long with 18 stations.

=== Western extension ===
The western extension to Qiche Gongyuan opened on 8 October 2021. The extension is 4.36 km in length.

== Opening timeline ==
Segment	Commencement	Length	Station(s)	Name
Shuangfeng — Dongfang Square	30 August 2018	20.5 km (12.74 mi)	18	Phase 1
Shuangfeng — Qiche Gongyuan	8 October 2021	4.36 km (2.71 mi)	3	Western extension
Dongfang Square — Wukaihe Dajie	28 September 2025		6	Eastern extension

== Service routes ==
- Qiche Gongyuan — Wukaihe Dajie

== Stations ==
Station name		Connections	Distance km		Location
English	Chinese	Connections	Distance km		Location
Qiche Gongyuan	汽车公园	7			Luyuan
Jieda Avenue	捷达大路				Luyuan
West Lake	西湖				Luyuan
Shuangfeng	双丰	6	2.18	2.18	Luyuan
Changchun West Railway Station	长春西站	6 CJ ~ JH; Tram 55 CRT	1.52	3.70	Luyuan
Xinglongpu	兴隆堡		2.09	5.79	Luyuan
West Ring Road	西环城路		1.41	7.20	Luyuan
Heping Street	和平大街		1.14	8.34	Luyuan
Wanfu Street	万福街	Tram 54	0.82	9.16	Luyuan
Jingyang Square	景阳广场		0.86	10.02	Luyuan
Jiefang Overpass	解放桥	3	1.07	11.09	Luyuan / Chaoyang
Jianshe Square	建设广场		0.80	11.89	Chaoyang
Wenhua Square	文化广场	5	0.75	12.64	Chaoyang
Jiefang Avenue	解放大路	1	1.36	14.00	Chaoyang / Nanguan
Pingyang Street	平阳街		0.78	14.78	Nanguan
Nanguan	南关		1.12	15.90	Nanguan
Jilin Avenue	吉林大路	4	1.31	17.21	Erdao
Dongsheng Street	东盛大街		0.99	18.20	Erdao
East Ring Road	东环城路	7	1.46	19.66	Erdao
Changqing	长青		1.27	20.93	Erdao / Nanguan
Dongfang Square	东方广场		1.38	22.31	Erdao
Ha'erbin Dajie	哈尔滨大街				Erdao
Doujiagou	窦家沟				Erdao
Yingjun Dajie	英俊大街				Erdao
Yingkai Dajie	英凯大街				Erdao
Linxi Dajie	林溪大街				Erdao
Wukaihe Dajie	雾开河大街				Erdao
