= Line 6 (Changchun Rail Transit) =

Metro line in Changchun, China

- Line 6 train

Overview
- Status: Operational
- Owner: Changchun
- Locale: Changchun, Jilin, China
- Termini: Shuangfeng; Changchun Movie Wonderland
- Stations: 22

Service
- Type: Rapid transit
- System: Changchun Rail Transit
- Services: 1
- Operator: Changchun Rail Transit Corporation
- Depot(s): Xihu depot, Wujiadian depot

History
- Opened: 28 March 2024; 2 years ago

Technical
- Line length: 29.57 km (18.37 mi)
- Number of tracks: 2
- Character: Underground
- Track gauge: 1,435 mm (4 ft 8 1/2 in)
- Electrification: overhead catenary

Line 6 of the Changchun Rail Transit (Chinese: 长春轨道交通6号线; pinyin: Chángchūn Guǐdào Jiāotōng Lìu Hào Xiàn) is a rapid transit line running from west to east in southern Changchun.

== History ==
Construction of Line 6 started on 30 September 2019.

Construction of the tunnels was completed on 30 April 2023. The tracks were completely installed by 26 May and powered by 29 May. Test trains were run starting in 8 December.

On 28 March 2024, Line 6 started its official operation.

== Opening timeline ==
Segment	Commencement	Length	Station(s)	Name
Shuangfeng — Changying Shijicheng	28 March 2024	29.57 km (18.37 mi)	22	Phase 1

== Service routes ==
- Shuangfeng — Changchun Movie Wonderland

== Stations ==
Station name		Connections	Distance km		Location
English	Chinese	Connections	Distance km		Location
Shuangfeng	双丰	2	-	0.0	Luyuan
Changchun West Railway Station	长春西站	2 CJ ~ JH; Tram 55	1.6	1.6	Luyuan
Tengyue Jie	腾跃街		1.7	3.3	Luyuan
Zhinong Dajie	支农大街		1.6	4.9	Luyuan
Feiyue Guangchang	飞跃广场	7	1.1	6.0	Luyuan
Ouya Maichang	欧亚卖场		1.4	7.4	Chaoyang
Guanggu Dajie	光谷大街		1.1	8.5	Chaoyang
Guigu Guangchang	硅谷广场	5	1.4	9.9	Chaoyang
Baihuayuan	百花园		1.6	11.5	Chaoyang
Shifayuan	市法院		0.9	12.4	Nanguan
Lanraohu Gongyuan	兰桡湖公园		1.8	14.2	Nanguan
Guidao Jituan	轨道集团		1.0	15.2	Nanguan
Xinming Jie	新明街		0.6	15.8	Nanguan
Huaqing Road	华庆路	1	1.2	17.0	Nanguan
Nanxi Shidi Gongyuan	南溪湿地公园		2.4	19.4	Nanguan
Fuzhi Avenue	福祉大路	4	2.1	21.5	Nanguan
Wujiadian	吴家店		1.7	23.2	Nanguan
Yatai Zuqiu Jidi	亚泰足球基地		1.9	25.1	Nanguan
Yinghua Jie	樱花街		1.0	26.1	Nanguan
Juye Dajie	聚业大街		1.1	27.2	Nanguan
Shengbowuyuan	省博物院		0.7	27.9	Nanguan
Changchun Movie Wonderland	长影世纪城	3	1.5	29.4	Nanguan
