= Line 1 (Changchun Rail Transit) =

Metro line in Changchun, China

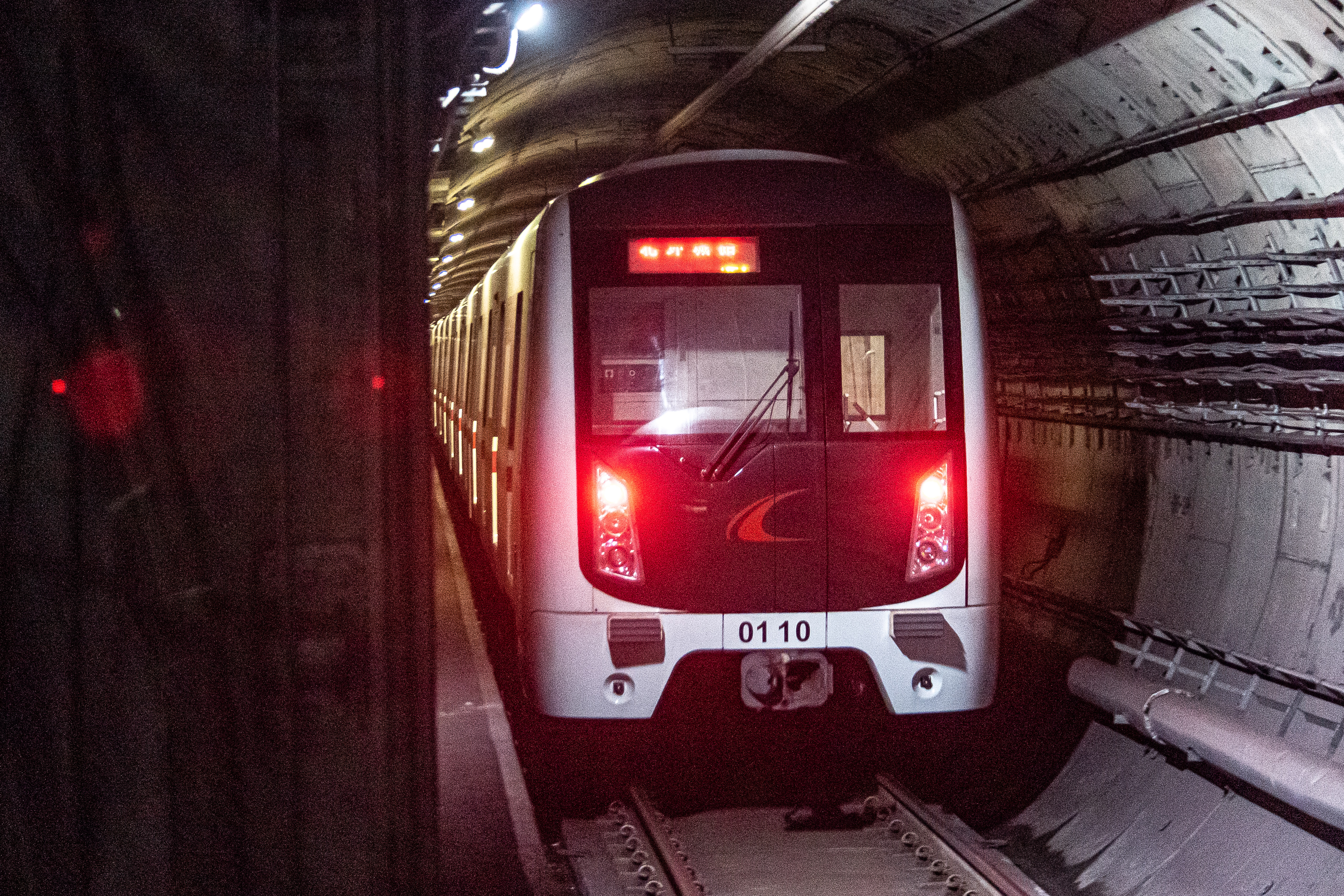
- Line 1 train leaving Hongzuizi station

Overview
- Status: Operational
- Owner: Changchun
- Locale: Changchun, Jilin, China
- Termini: North Ring Road; Hongzuizi
- Stations: 15

Service
- Type: Rapid transit
- System: Changchun Rail Transit
- Services: 1
- Operator: Changchun Rail Transit Corporation

History
- Opened: 30 June 2017; 9 years ago

Technical
- Line length: 18.14 km (11.27 mi)
- Number of tracks: 2
- Character: Underground
- Track gauge: 1,435 mm (4 ft 8 1/2 in)

Line 1 of the Changchun Rail Transit (Chinese: 长春轨道交通1号线; pinyin: Chángchūn Guǐdào Jiāotōng Yī Hào Xiàn) is a rapid transit line running from north to south Changchun. It opened on 30 June 2017. This line is 18.14 km long with 15 stations.

== Opening timeline ==
Segment	Commencement	Length	Station(s)	Name
North Ring Road — Hongzuizi	30 June 2017	18.14 km (11.27 mi)	14	Phase 1
Changchun Railway Station	26 January 2019	infill station	1	

== Service routes ==
- North Ring Road — Hongzuizi

== Stations ==
Station name		Connections	Distance km		Location
English	Chinese	Connections	Distance km		Location
North Ring Road	北环城路	8	0.00	0.00	Kuancheng
Qingfeng Road	庆丰路		1.19	1.19	Kuancheng
Yikuang Street	一匡街		1.31	2.50	Kuancheng
Changchun Railway Station (North)	长春站北	CJ ~ JH CB ~ BA CCT; 4	1.12	3.62	Kuancheng
Changchun Railway Station	长春站	CJ ~ JH CB ~ BA CCT; 3	0.75	4.37	Kuancheng
Shengli Park	胜利公园		0.93	5.30	Kuancheng
Renmin Square	人民广场	5	1.42	6.72	Chaoyang / Nanguan
Jiefang Avenue	解放大路	2	1.00	7.72	Chaoyang / Nanguan
Northeast Normal University	东北师大		1.57	9.29	Chaoyang / Nanguan
Gongnong Square	工农广场	7	1.44	10.73	Chaoyang / Nanguan
Fanrong Road	繁荣路		1.23	11.96	Chaoyang / Nanguan
Weixing Square	卫星广场	3	0.80	12.76	Chaoyang / Nanguan
Municipal Government	市政府		1.48	14.24	Nanguan
Huaqing Road	华庆路	6	1.09	15.33	Nanguan
Hongzuizi	红嘴子		1.08	16.41	Nanguan
