= Line 7 (Changchun Rail Transit) =

Metro line in Changchun, Jilin

Overview
- Status: In operation (Phase 1)
- Owner: Changchun Rail Transit
- Locale: Changchun, Jilin, China
- Termini: Qiche Gongyuan; Donghuanchenglu
- Stations: 19

Service
- Type: Rapid transit
- System: Changchun Rail Transit
- Operator: Changchun Rail Transit

History
- Opened: 26 August 2026; 33 days ago

Technical
- Line length: 23.16 km (14.39 mi) (in operation)
- Number of tracks: 2
- Character: Underground
- Track gauge: 1,435 mm (4 ft 8 1/2 in)
- Electrification: 1,500 V DC overhead catenary contact
- Operating speed: 80 km/h (50 mph) (Maximum design speed)

Line 7 of the Changchun Rail Transit (Chinese: 长春轨道交通7号线; pinyin: Chángchūn Guǐdào Jiāotōng Qī Hào Xiàn) is a metro line serving Changchun, Jilin, China. The first phase of Line 7 was officially put into operation on 26 August 2026, instead of 30 September 2026 as originally planned.

In the first phase, 20 sets of rolling stock B-type 6 cars will be put into operation.

== History ==
On 12 April 2020, the first phase of Line 7 commenced construction with total investment of 19.1 billion RMB. On 23 December 2025, the entire of Line 7 Phase 1 was fully connected. In July 2026, Line 7 entered trial operation without passengers.

Phase 1 of Line 7 commenced operation at 8:08 am on 26 August 2026.

Segment	Commencement	Length	Station(s)	Name
Qiche Gongyuan — Donghuanchenglu	26 August 2026	23.16 km (14.39 mi)	19	First Phase

== Stations ==
All 19 stations in operation are underground with an average station distance of 1.2 km (0.75 mi).

The peak interval is about 6 minutes, while off-peak interval is about 7 minutes and 18 seconds.

Station name		Transfer	Distance km	Location
English	Chinese	Transfer	Distance km	Location
Qiche Gongyuan	汽车公园	2		Luyuan
Xihu Dalu	西湖大路			Luyuan
Xing'an Lu	兴安路			Luyuan
Xingshun Lu	兴顺路			Luyuan
Feiyue Guangchang	飞跃广场	6		Luyuan
Diyi Qiche Zhizaochang	第一汽车制造厂			Luyuan
Mengjiatun	孟家屯	3		Chaoyang
Huinan Jie	辉南街			Chaoyang
Nanhu Guangchang (Jida Nanhu Xiaoqu)	南湖广场（吉大南湖校区）	5		Chaoyang
Nanhu Gongyuan	南湖公园			Chaoyang
Gongnong Square	工农广场	1		Chaoyang, Nanguan
Shengshuiwuju	省税务局			Nanguan
Dongling Nanjie	东岭南街			Nanguan
Weihai Road	威海路	4		Nanguan
Saide Guangchang	赛得广场			Nanguan
Huizhan Dajie	会展大街			Nanguan
Zhongdong Dashichang	中东大市场			Nanguan
Lingdong Lu	岭东路			Erdao
Donghuanchenglu	东环城路	2		Erdao
