= Line 4 (Changchun Rail Transit) =

Metro line in Changchun, China

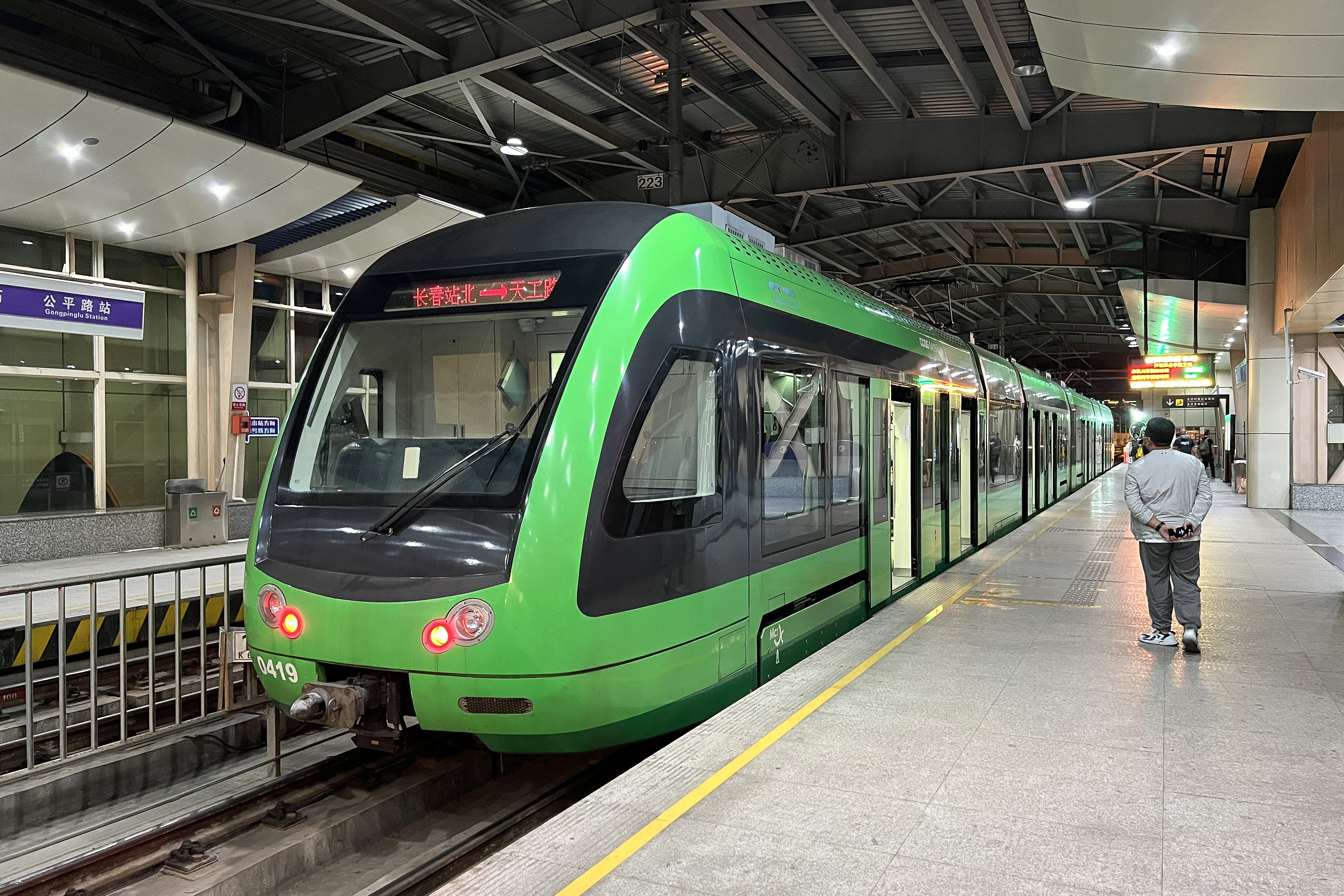
- A train at Jilin Avenue station

Overview
- Status: Operational
- Owner: Changchun
- Locale: Changchun, Jilin, China
- Termini: Changchun Railway Station (North); Tianxin Road
- Stations: 21

Service
- Type: Light rapid transit
- System: Changchun Rail Transit
- Services: 1
- Operator: Changchun Rail Transit Corporation
- Depot: Tiangong Road Depot
- Rolling stock: Changchun Light Rail 3000 Stock/4000 Stock

History
- Opened: 30 June 2011; 15 years ago

Technical
- Line length: 20.8 km (12.9 mi)
- Number of tracks: 2
- Character: elevated and underground
- Track gauge: 1,435 mm (4 ft 8 1/2 in)
- Electrification: Overhead line, 750 V DC
- Operating speed: 70 km/h

Line 4 of the Changchun Rail Transit (Chinese: 长春轨道交通4号线; pinyin: Chángchūn Guǐdào Jiāotōng Sì Hào Xiàn) is a grade separated light rapid transit line in Changchun, running from north to south. Although it uses extended low floor LRVs, the line operates more like a metro, being entirely separate from traffic, similar to the Seville Metro in Spain and U6 of the Vienna U-Bahn.

Line 4 was opened on 30 June 2011. It is currently 20.8 km (12.9 mi) long with 21 stations.

== Opening timeline ==
Segment	Commencement	Length	Station(s)	Name
Dongdaqiao Bridge — Tiangong Road	30 June 2011	13.0 km (8.1 mi)	11	Initial section
Changchun Railway Station (North) — Dongdaqiao Bridge	7 May 2012	3.3 km (2.1 mi)	3	Northern extension
Gongping Road	17 December 2012	Infill station	1	
Tiangong Road — Tianxin Road	6 June 2023	4.5 km (2.8 mi)	5	Southern extension
Dongxin Road	31 December 2023	Infill station	1	

== Stations ==
Station name		Connections	Distance km		Location
English	Chinese	Connections	Distance km		Location
Changchun Railway Station (North)	长春站北	CJ ~ JH CB ~ BA CCT; 1	0.00	0.00	Kuancheng
Beiyatai Street	北亚泰大街		1.25	1.25	Kuancheng
Puppet Regime Palace Museum	伪满皇宫	3	1.60	2.85	Kuancheng
Dongdaqiao Bridge	东大桥	OSI: 5	0.60	3.45	Nanguan
Dongxin Road	东新路		1.25	4.70	Erdao
Jilin Avenue	吉林大路	2	1.25	5.95	Erdao
Gongping Road	公平路		1.00	6.95	Erdao
Haikou Road	海口路		0.95	7.90	Erdao
Pudong Road	浦东路		0.75	8.65	Erdao
Weihai Road	威海路	7	0.70	9.35	Erdao
Beihai Road	北海路		0.95	10.30	Erdao
Vocational Institute of Technology	职业学院	3	1.05	11.35	Erdao
Shirong Road	世荣路		0.80	12.15	Nanguan
South Ring Road	南环城路		0.90	13.05	Nanguan
Yisheng Street	宜盛街		1.15	14.20	Nanguan
Tiangong Road	天工路		1.30	15.50	Nanguan
Fuzhi Avenue	福祉大路	6			Nanguan
Tianqing Road	天青路				Nanguan
Tianpu Road	天普路				Nanguan
Qianshilipu	前十里堡				Nanguan
Tianxin Road	天新路				Nanguan

== See also ==
- Changchun Rail Transit
