= Changchun Rail Transit =

Public transport system in Changchun, China

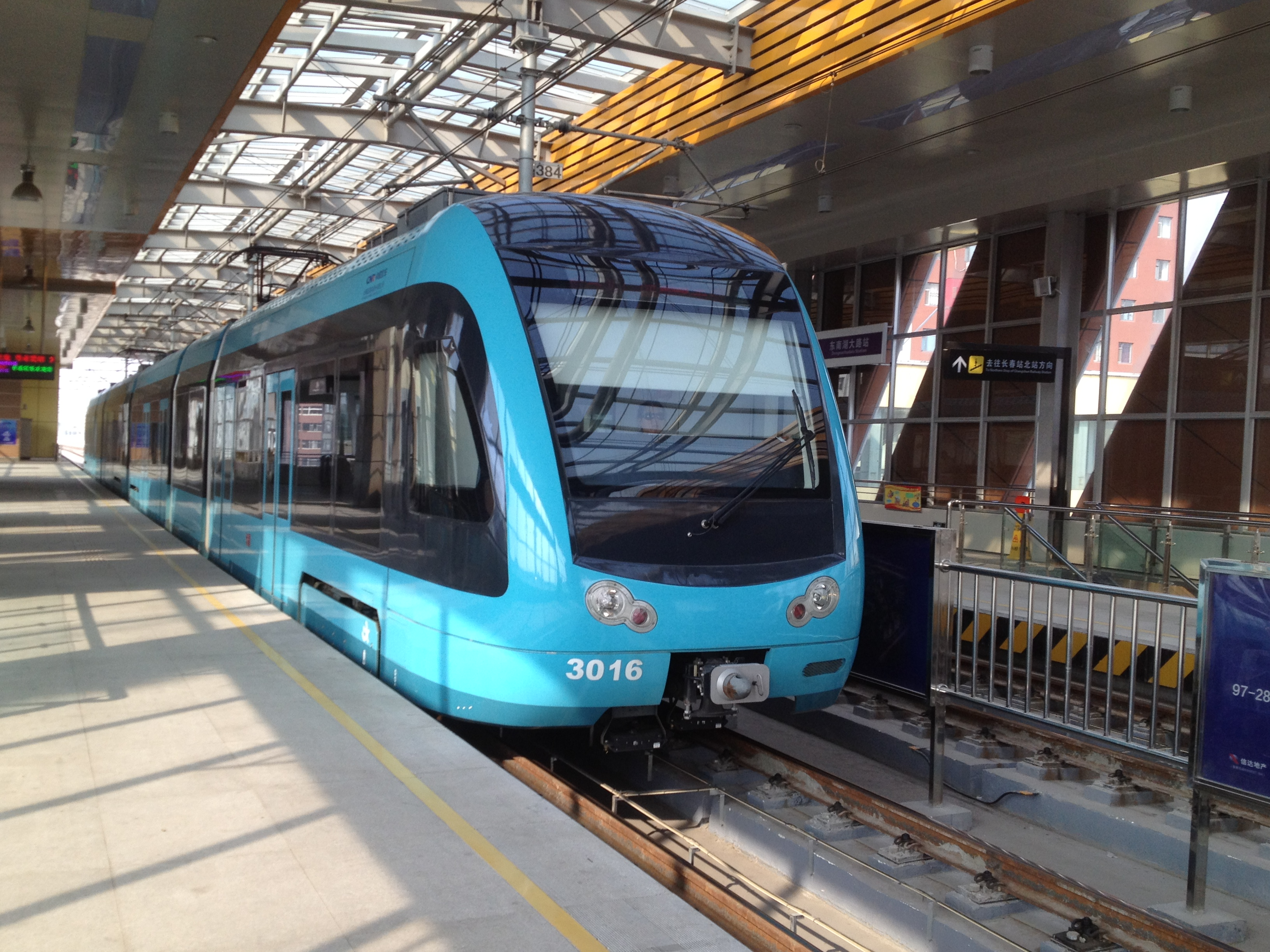

Overview
- Locale: Changchun, Jilin Province, China
- Transit type: Rapid transit & Light rail
- Number of lines: 3 (light rail); 5 (rapid transit)
- Number of stations: 168 (Note: Interchange stations are counted repeatedly for each line they serve. If interchange stations are counted only once, then the total number of stations would be 141.)
- Daily ridership: 938,000 (20.12.2019)
- Annual ridership: 218.75 million (2023)

Operation
- Began operation: 30 October 2002; 24 years ago; 30 September 2017; 9 years ago
- Operators: Changchun Railway Traffic Group Co., Ltd.

Technical
- System length: Total: 194.19 km (120.66 mi)
- Track gauge: 1,435 mm (4 ft 8 1/2 in)
System map

Changchun Rail Transit
- Simplified Chinese: 长春轨道交通
- Traditional Chinese: 長春軌道交通
Transcriptions
Standard Mandarin
- Hanyu Pinyin: Chángchūn Guǐdào Jiāotōng

Changchun Rail Transit is the rapid transit and light rail system in the city of Changchun, Jilin Province, China. Its first line, Line 3, is the first true light rail line in Mainland China. The system consists of three light rail lines and five rapid transit lines.

The current total length of the network is 194.19 kilometers (120.664 mi) with 168 stations. One line is under construction.

== History ==
=== Line 3 ===
Line 3 is the first light rail transit line in Mainland China. In September 1999, the State Council of the People's Republic of China formally approved the proposal for the first phase of the Changchun Light Rail Ring Line project.

On October 30, 2002, the first phase of the Changchun Light Rail Transit (from Changchun Railway Station to Weiguang Street) officially opened for service. It serves 17 stations and spans a total length of approximately 14.6 kilometers (about 9.07 miles).

The second phase of the Changchun Light Rail Transit was later opened, extending Line 3 by an additional 9.3 kilometers. The total length of Line 3 then reached 24 kilometers (about 14.91 miles), stretching from the Jingyue Development District to the Kuancheng District.

In 2018, the renovation project of Changchun Railway Station began, which caused the Changchun Railway Station stop on Line 3 to be temporarily suspended.

In April 2021, Lines 3 and 4 of the Changchun Rail Transit were connected for in-station transfers. Two transfer stations are now available: Weimanhuanggong Station and Vocational Institute of Technology Station.

=== Line 1 ===
Construction of the first heavy-rail metro line, Line 1, started in 2011, and opened for service on 30 June 2017. Line 1 serves 15 stations and is 18.14 kilometers (11.272 mi) long.

=== Line 2 ===
Construction on the second heavy-rail metro line, Line 2, started in 2012, and opened for service on 30 August 2018. Line 2 serves 21 stations and is 24.9 kilometers (15.472 mi) long.

=== Line 8 ===
A new light rail line link the North Lake area, numbered Line 8, opened for service on June 30, 2018, 16 years after Line 3 opened. Line 8 is the first light rail line using the same fare with the metro system, and the first line to directly interchange with the metro system.

== Fare System ==
On May 30, 2019, the fare systems of the original light rail system (Line 3 and Line 4) and the new metro system (Line 1, Line 2 and Line 8) were combined, and passengers can directly transfer between the original light rail system and the new metro system.

== Network ==
System map

| Line | | Terminals (District) | | Commencement | Newest Extension | Length km | Stations |
|---|---|---|---|---|---|---|---|
| Metro | 1 | North Ring Road (Kuancheng) | Hongzuizi (Nanguan) | June 30, 2017 | —N/a | 18.1 | 15 |
| Metro | 2 | Qiche Gongyuan (Luyuan) | Wukaihe Dajie (Erdao) | August 30, 2018 | September 28, 2025 | 35.5 | 27 |
| Light Rail | 3 | Weimanhuanggong (Kuancheng) | Changchun Movie Wonderland (Nanguan) | October 30, 2002 | December 31, 2021 | 34.3 | 34 |
| Light Rail | 4 | Changchun Railway Station (North) (Kuancheng) | Tianxin Road (Nanguan) | June 30, 2011 | June 6, 2023 | 20.8 | 21 |
| Metro | 5 | Zhuoyue Dajie (Chaoyang) | Dongdaqiao (Nanguan) | September 28, 2026 | —N/a | 19.66 | 18 |
| Metro | 6 | Shuangfeng (Luyuan) | Changchun Movie Wonderland (Nanguan) | March 28, 2024 | —N/a | 29.57 | 22 |
| Metro | 7 | Qiche Gongyuan (Luyuan) | Donghuanchenglu (Erdao) | August 26, 2026 | —N/a | 23.16 | 19 |
| Light Rail | 8 | North Ring Road (Kuancheng) | Guangtong Road (Kuancheng) | October 30, 2018 | —N/a | 13.1 | 12 |
| Total | | | | | | 194.19 | 168 |

=== Line 1 ===
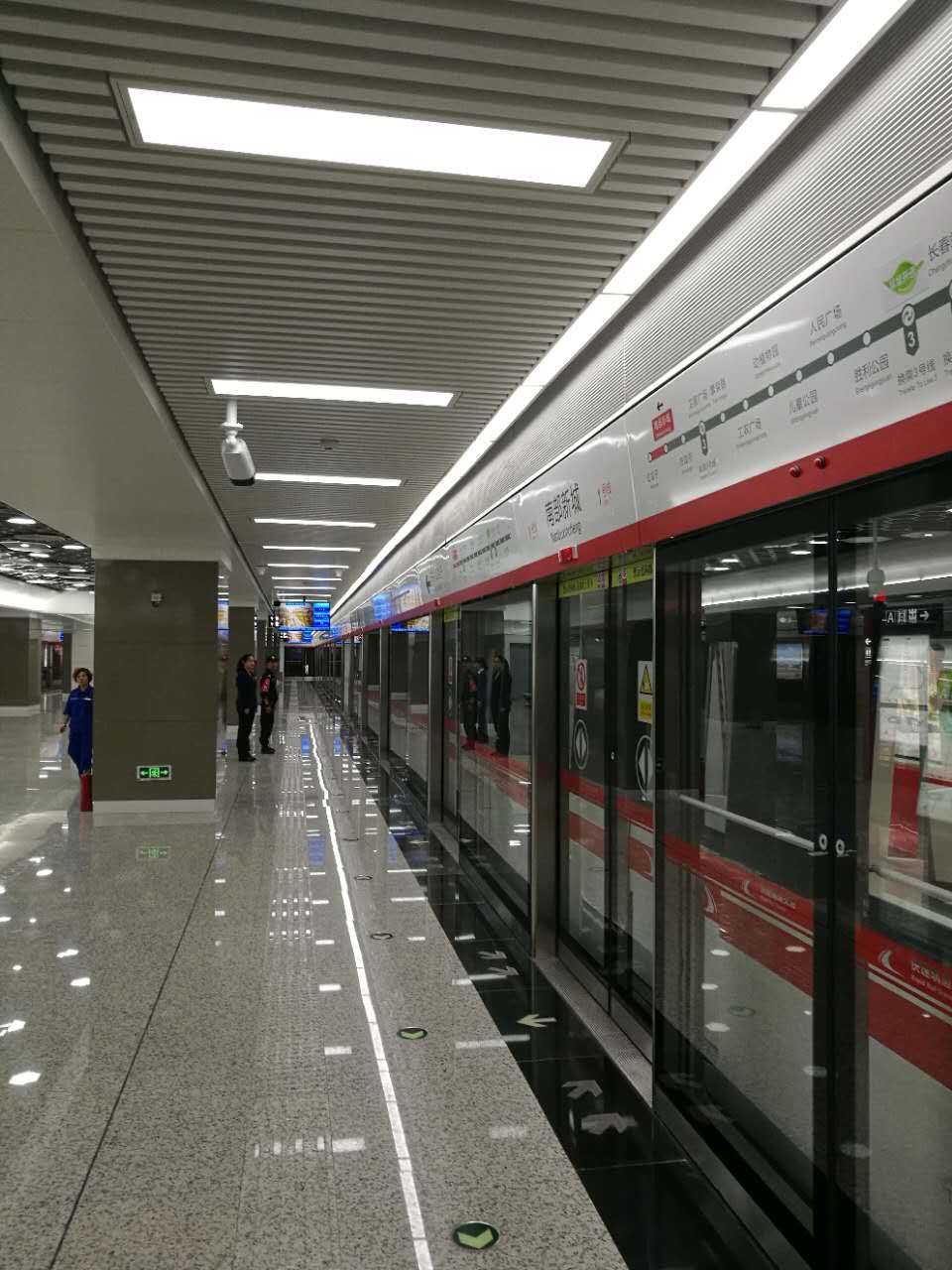
Huaqing Road station of Line 1

Line 1 is the first rapid transit metro line Changchun, running on the north-south central axis of Changchun.

Line 1's color is red.

=== Line 2 ===
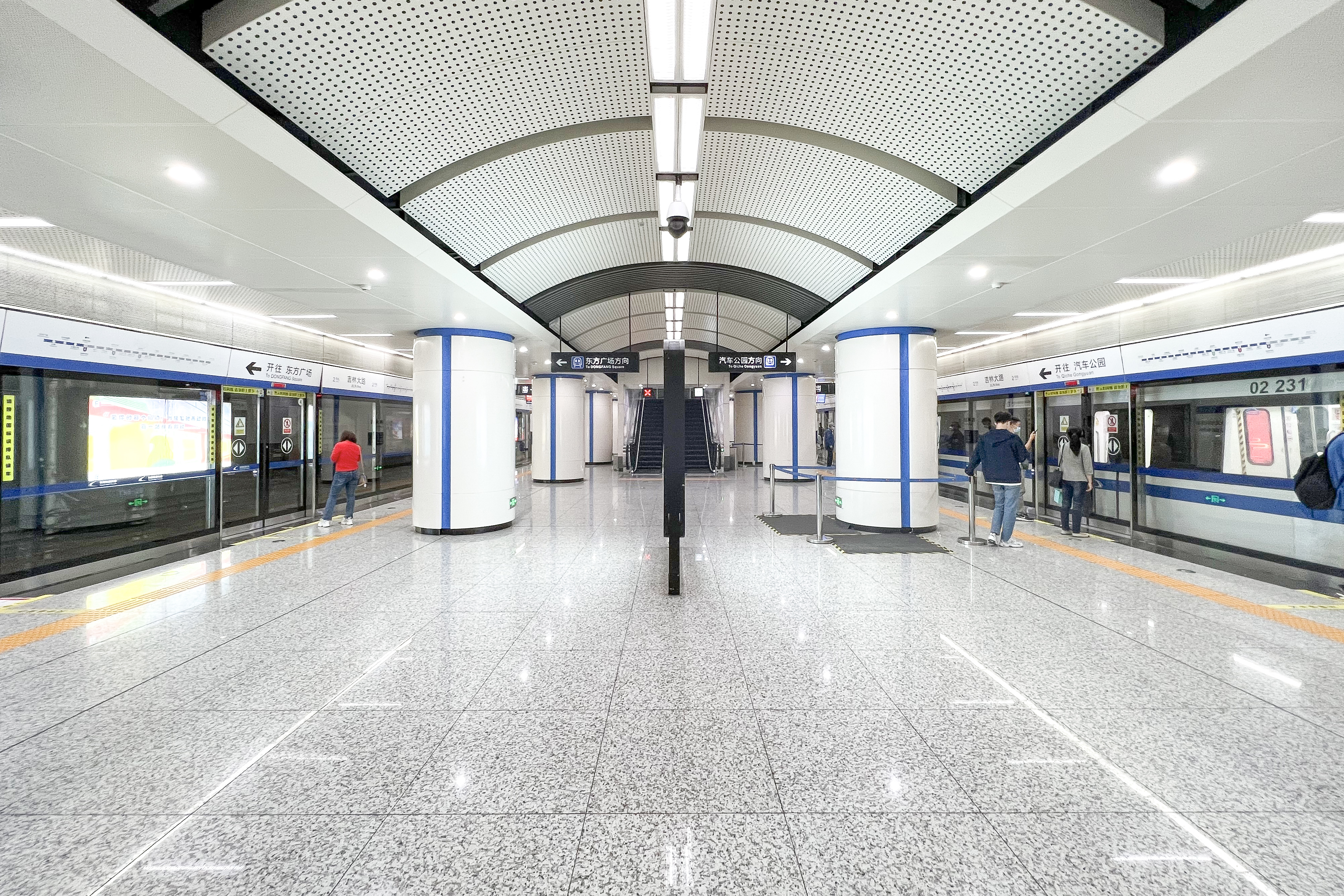
Jilin Avenue station of Line 2

Line 2 is the second metro line in Changchun, running on the east-west central axis of Changchun.

Line 2's color is blue.

=== Line 3 ===
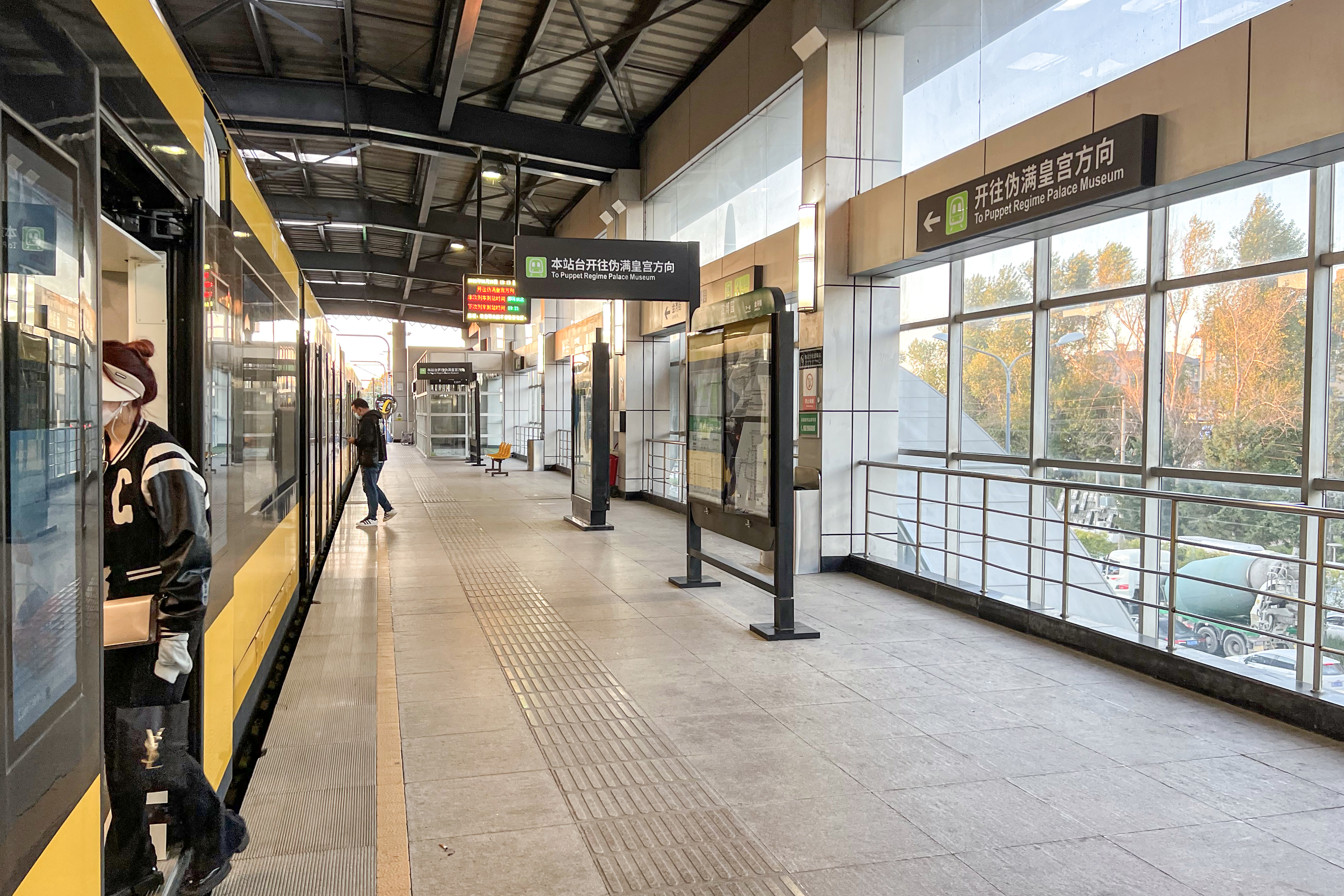
Agricultural Expo Garden station of Line 3

Line 3 marked the inaugural rail line to commence operations in Changchun. It forms an S-shaped route encircling the city center, constituting the western segment of the light rail loop and extending as an outer-loop branch to the Jingyue area. This line operates with low-floor light rail vehicles rather than the conventional rapid transit rolling stock.

In contrast to subsequent lines, Line 3 predominantly operates at ground level in its western section, running parallel to the Jingha railway, and primarily travels on elevated tracks in the eastern portion. Notably, the line is not entirely grade-separated, as it retains four level crossings even after undergoing several renovations.

Line 3's color is green.

=== Line 4 ===
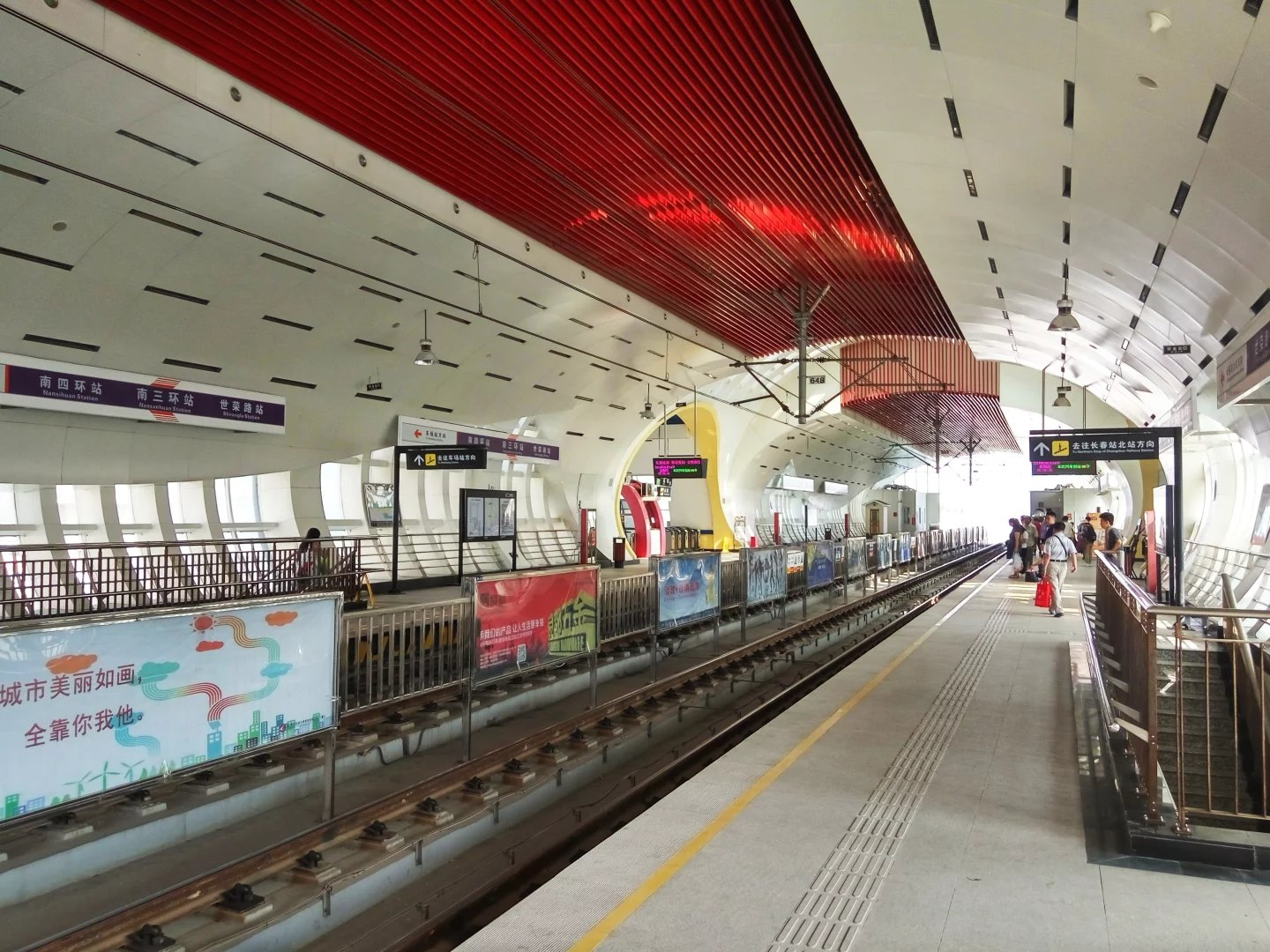
South Ring Road station of Line 4

Line 4 is another light rail line. Unlike line 3, it has complete grade separation, but still uses the same low-floor light rail vehicles as line 3, similar to the Seville Metro in Spain. It runs in a north-south direction, close to the Yitong river, making up the east half of light rail loop. The line runs mostly on elevated viaducts with an underground section in the north.

Line 4's color is purple.

=== Line 6 ===
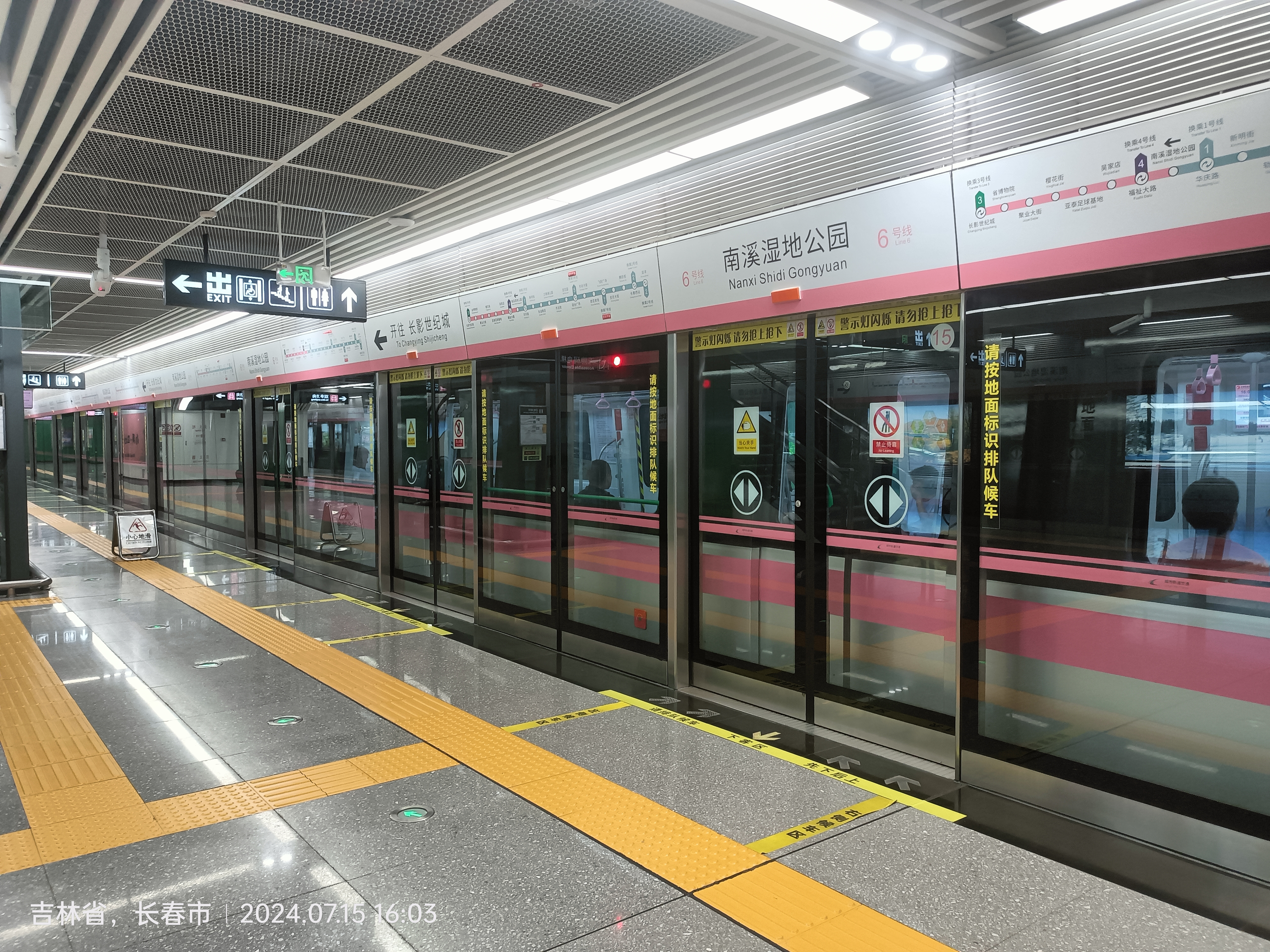
Nanxi Shidi Gongyuan station of Line 6

Line 6 is a new metro line that commenced operations in 2024, traversing the South New Area of Changchun. This line connects Changchun West Railway Station with the Jingyue district, following a route along the southern corridor of Line 3 to alleviate passenger congestion on that line.

Line 6's color is pink.

=== Line 8 ===
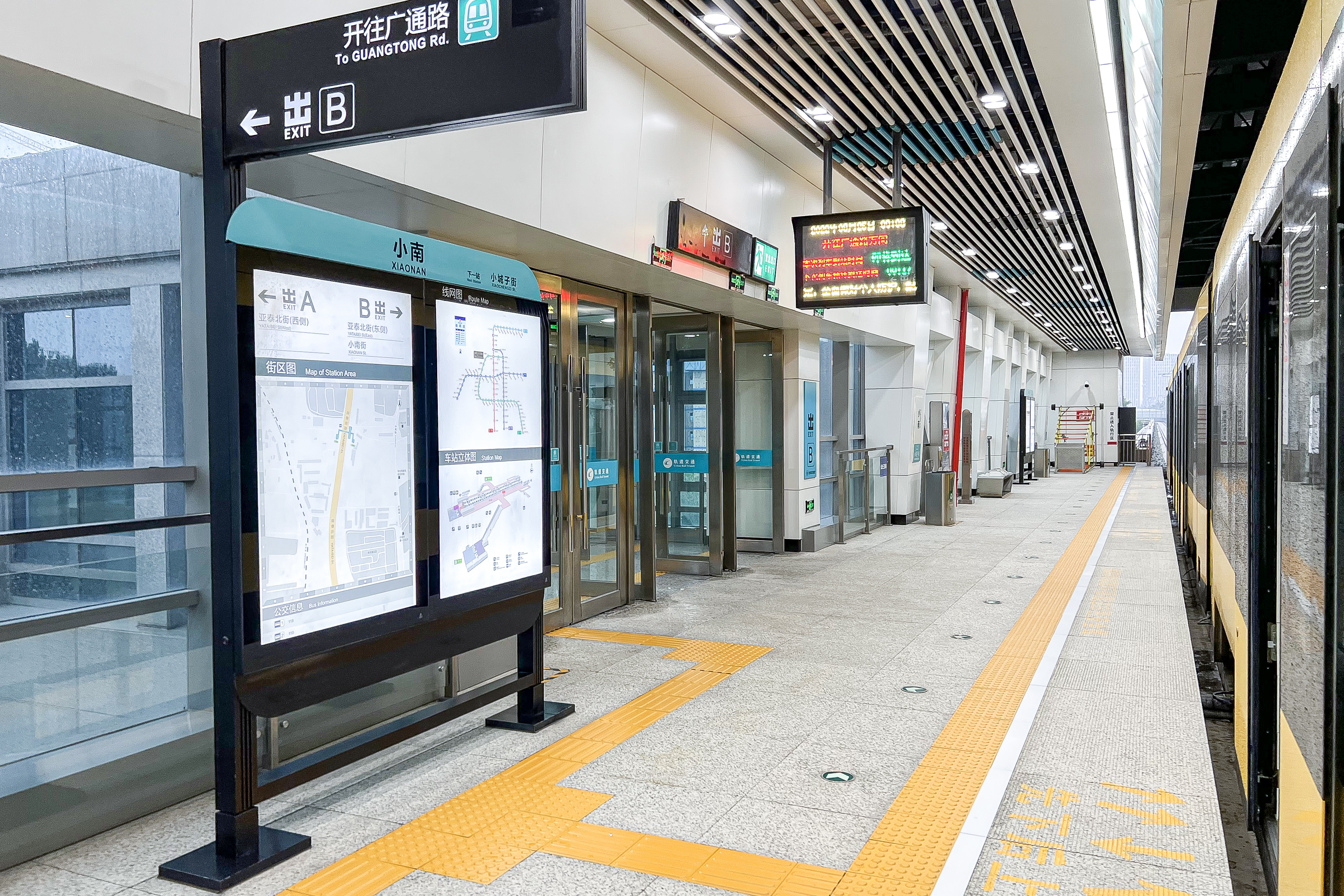
Xiaonan station of Line 8

Line 8 is a light rail line, operating in the northern region to connect the North Lake area with the heart of Changchun, which includes a link to Line 1. Similar to Line 4, Line 8 is entirely grade-separated and utilizes low-floor light rail vehicles. However, it differs in that it operates entirely on elevated tracks as opposed to running partially underground.

Line 8's color is teal.

== Opening timeline ==
- 30 October 2002: 3 Changchun Railway Station - Weiguang Street
- 26 December 2006: 3 Weixing Square - Changchun Movie Wonderland
- 3 April 2007: 3 Weiguang Street - Weixing Square
- 30 June 2011: 4 Dongdaqiao Bridge - Tiangong Road
- 6 May 2012: 4 Changchun Railway Station (North) - Dongdaqiao Bridge
- 17 December 2012: 4 Gongping Road Station
- 30 June 2017: 1 North Ring Road - Hongzuizi
- 30 August 2018: 2 Shuangfeng - Dongfang Square
- 30 October 2018: 8 North Ring Road - Guangtong Road
- 8 October 2021: 2 Auto Park - Shuangfeng
- 31 December 2021: 3 Changchun Railway Station - Weimanhuanggong
- 6 June 2023: 4 Tiangong Road - Tianxin Road
- 31 December 2023: 4 Dongxin Road Station
- 28 March 2024: 6 Shuangfeng - Changchun Movie Wonderland.
- 25 September 2025: 2 Dongfang Square — Wukaihe Dajie.
- 26 August 2026: 7 Qiche Gongyuan — Donghuanchenglu.
- 28 September 2026: 5 Zhuoyue Dajie — Dongdaqiao

== Future development ==
The Phase 3 (2019-2024) expansion of Changchun Rail Transit was approved by the NDRC on November 30, 2018. According to the plan, Changchun Rail Transit will be 235 km (146.022 mi) in length in 2024.

=== Under construction ===
- 2028:: 9 (Airport line): 28 km (17.398 mi) (16 km (9.942 mi) underground, 12 km (7.456 mi) elevated) with 8 stations. Zhaojiagang East – Jiutai South railway station. Heavy rail.

=== Planned ===
- 3 (Southern extension): 3 km (1.864 mi) with 2 stations. Changchun Movie Wonderland – Changchun No.59 Middle School. Light rail.

== See also ==
- Changchun, the capital city of Jilin Province
- List of metro systems
- Urban rail transit in China

=== Other Transport in Changchun ===
- Changchun Tram (Tram Routes 54 and 55)
