= Changchun West railway station =

Railway station in China

Changchunxi Railway Station 长春西站
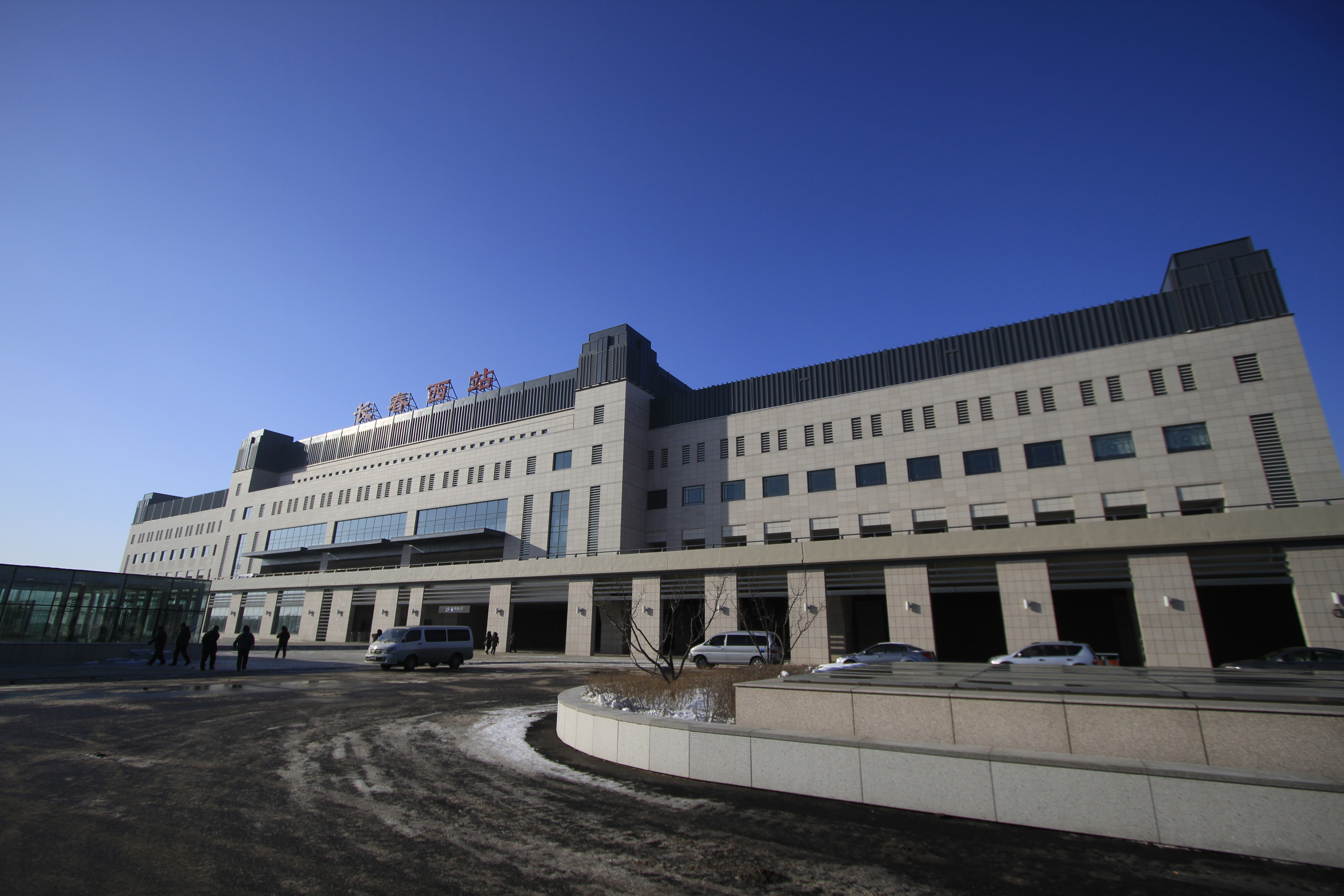
- Station bulilding pictured at South square

General information
- Other names: Changchun West
- Location: Changchun, Jilin; China
- Coordinates: 43°59′26″N 125°41′38″E
- Operator: China Railway Corporation
- Lines: China Railway High-speed: Beijing–Harbin, Harbin–Dalian
- Platforms: 9

History
- Opened: December 1,2012
Location

Changchun West railway station is a railway station on the Harbin–Dalian section of the Beijing–Harbin High-Speed Railway, and the Changchun–Jilin Intercity Railway. It is in the western part of Changchun, Jilin province, China. The station opened on December 1, 2012.

== Transportation ==
There is a transfer hub beneath the station south square. A metro station of Changchun Rail Transit with the same name is located in the transfer hub, which Line 2 and Line 6 are going through. On the ground, there is a bus hub at the south square, and a tram station in northeast of the square, which is served by No. 55 tram of the Changchun Tram. It is also the terminal station of the tram line.

== See also ==
- Chinese Eastern Railway
- South Manchuria Railway
- South Manchuria Railway Zone
- Changchun Rail Transit
- Changchun Tram

Preceding station	China Railway High-speed	Following station
Changchun towards Harbin	Harbin–Dalian high-speed railway Part of the Beijing–Harbin High-Speed Railway	Gongzhuling South towards Dalian
