= Line 5 (Changchun Rail Transit) =

Metro line in Changchun, Jilin

Overview
- Status: In operation
- Owner: Changchun Rail Transit
- Locale: Changchun, Jilin, China
- Termini: Dongdaqiao; Zhuoyue Dajie
- Stations: 18 (In operation); 40 (total)

Service
- Type: Rapid transit
- System: Changchun Rail Transit
- Operator: Changchun Rail Transit

History
- Opened: 28 September 2026; 49 days ago

Technical
- Line length: 19.5 km (12.1 mi) (in operation); 52.5 km (32.6 mi) (total)
- Num of tracks: 2
- Character: Underground
- Track gauge: 1,435 mm (4 ft 8 1/2 in)
- Electrification: 1,500 V DC overhead catenary contact
- Operating speed: 80 km/h (50 mph) (Maximum design speed)

Line 5 of the Changchun Rail Transit (Chinese: 长春轨道交通5号线; pinyin: Chángchūn Guǐdào Jiāotōng Wǔ Hào Xiàn) is a metro line serving Changchun, Jilin, China. The first phase of Line 5 was officially put into operation at 7:58 am on 28 September 2026.

== History ==
Phase 1 of Line 5 started construction on 1 August 2020. A 90-day onboard trial operation without passengers was completed on 10 September 2026.

Phase 1 of Line 5 commenced operation at 7:58 am on 28 September 2026.

Segment	Commencement	Length	Station(s)	Name
Dongdaqiao — Zhuoyue Dajie	28 September 2026	19.5 km (12.12 mi)	17	Phase 1
Changying Jiuzhi Bowuguan	22 October 2026		1	Infill station

== Stations ==
All 18 stations are underground.

Station name		Transfer	Distance km	Location
Pinyin	Chinese	Transfer	Distance km	Location
Zhuoyue Dajie	卓越大街			Chaoyang
Shiwei Dangxiao	市委党校			Chaoyang
Shunda Lu	顺达路			Chaoyang
Yueda Lu	越达路			Chaoyang
Anxin Lu	安新路			Chaoyang
Weishan Lu	蔚山路			Chaoyang
Guigu Guangchang (Jida Zhongxin Xiaoqu)	硅谷广场（吉大中心校区）	6		Chaoyang
Diantai Jie	电台街	3		Chaoyang
Shengwei Dangxiao	省委党校			Chaoyang
Nanhu Guangchang (Jida Nanhu Xiaoqu)	南湖广场（吉大南湖校区）	7		Chaoyang
Changying Jiuzhi Bowuguan	长影旧址博物馆			Chaoyang
Hongqi Jie	红旗街			Chaoyang
Wenhua Guangchang	文化广场	2		Chaoyang
Tongzhi Jie	同志街			Chaoyang
Renmin Guangchang	人民广场	1		Nanguan
Dajing Lu	大经路			Nanguan
Shengfu'er Zhongxin	省妇儿中心			Nanguan
Dongdaqiao	东大桥	OSI: 4		Nanguan
