= Line 8 (Changchun Rail Transit) =

Metro line in Changchun, China

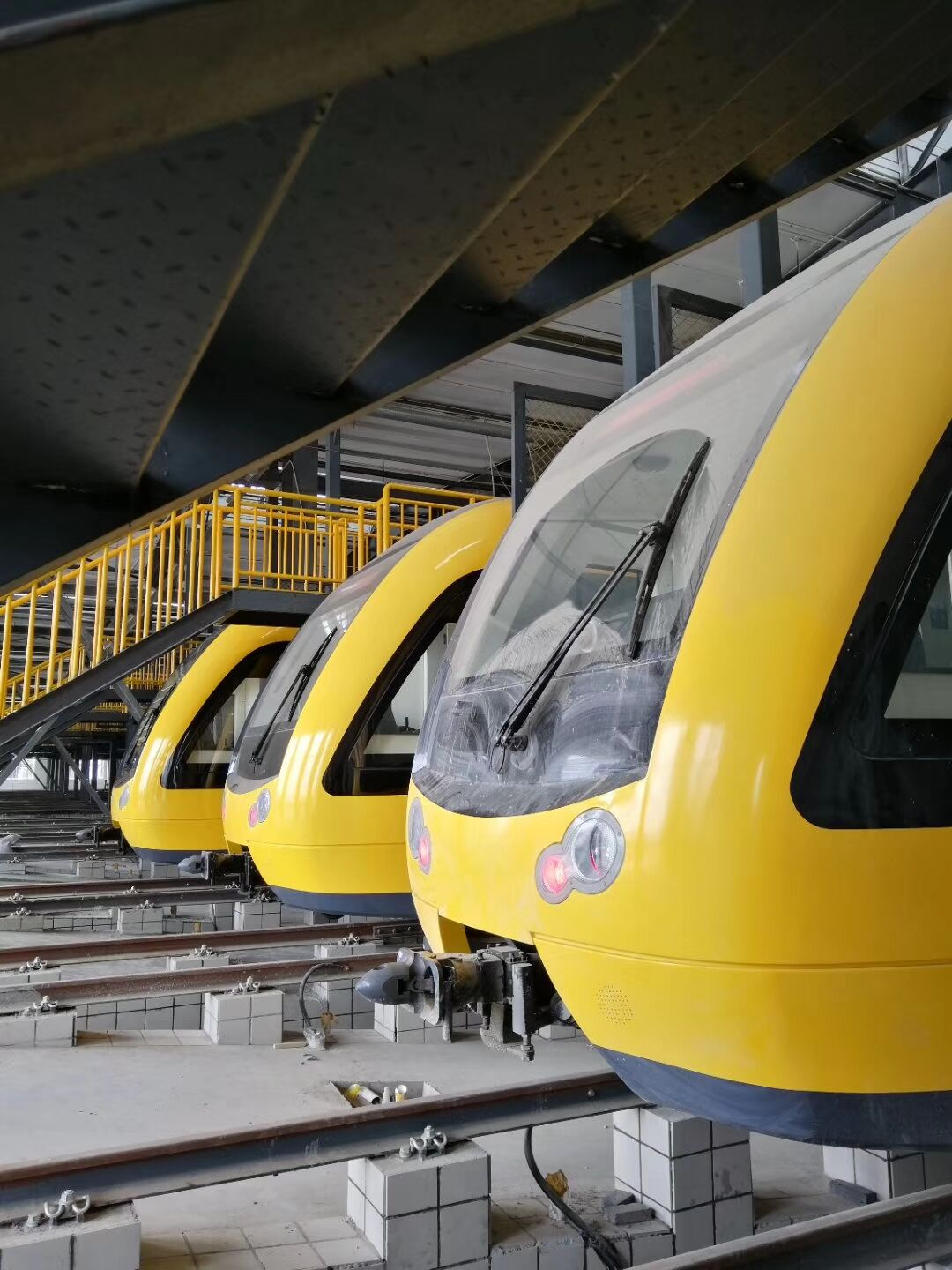

Overview
- Other name(s): Beihu Line (Chinese: 北湖线; lit. 'North Lake Line')
- Status: Operational
- Owner: Changchun
- Locale: Changchun, Jilin, China
- Termini: North Ring Road; Guangtong Road
- Stations: 12

Service
- Type: Light rapid transit
- System: Changchun Rail Transit
- Services: 1
- Operator: Changchun Rail Transit Corporation
- Depot: Taiping Village Depot
- Rolling stock: Changchun Light Rail 3500 Stock

History
- Opened: 30 October 2018; 7 years ago

Technical
- Line length: 13.3 km (8.26 mi)
- Number of tracks: 2
- Character: Elevated
- Track gauge: 1,435 mm (4 ft 8 1/2 in)
- Electrification: Overhead line, 750 V DC
- Operating speed: 70 km/h

Line 8 of the Changchun Rail Transit (Chinese: 长春轨道交通8号线; pinyin: Chángchūn Guǐdào Jiāotōng Bā Hào Xiàn) is a grade separated light rapid transit line running from south to north in northern Changchun, linking the North Lake area with the urban center. It opened on 30 October 2018. This line is 13.3 km (8.3 mi) long with 12 stations.

== Opening timeline ==
| Segment | Commencement | Length | Station(s) | Name |
|---|---|---|---|---|
| North Ring Road — Guangtong Road | 30 October 2018 | 13.3 km (8.26 mi) | 12 | Phase 1 |

== Service routes ==
- North Ring Road — Guangtong Road

== Stations ==
| Station name | | Connections | Distance km | | Location |
| English | Chinese | Connections | Distance km | | Location |
|---|---|---|---|---|---|
| North Ring Road | 北环城路 | 1 | 0.00 | 0.00 | Kuancheng |
| No.123 Middle School | 一二三中学 | | 1.23 | 1.23 | Kuancheng |
| Xiaonan | 小南 | | 1.11 | 2.34 | Kuancheng |
| Xiaochengzi Street | 小城子街 | | 0.66 | 3.00 | Kuancheng |
| North Lake Bridge | 北湖大桥 | | 2.37 | 5.37 | Kuancheng |
| North Lake Park | 北湖公园 | | 0.95 | 6.32 | Kuancheng |
| He'an Street | 和安街 | | 0.77 | 7.09 | Kuancheng |
| Guangji Road | 光机路 | | 1.46 | 8.55 | Kuancheng |
| Daxuecheng Road | 大学城路 | | 1.00 | 9.55 | Kuancheng |
| Institute of Geography | 地理所 | | 1.33 | 10.88 | Kuancheng |
| Olympic Park | 奥林匹克公园 | | 1.07 | 11.95 | Kuancheng |
| Guangtong Road | 广通路 | | 1.25 | 13.20 | Kuancheng |
