= Yingjun =

Yingjun 英俊镇
- Town
- Location in Jilin
- Coordinates: 43°51′50″N 125°28′0″E
- Country: People's Republic of China
- Province: Jilin
- Prefecture-level city: Changchun
- District: Erdao District
- Time zone: UTC+8 (China Standard)

Yingjun (Chinese: 英俊; pinyin: Yīngjùn) is a town under the administration of Erdao District, Changchun, Jilin, China. As of 2020, it administers Sandao (三道) Residential Neighborhood and the following six villages:

- Heping Village (和平村)
- Weixing Village (卫星村)
- Sihe Village (四合村)
- Xiangshui Village (香水村)
- Weizi Village (苇子村)
- Hujia Village (胡家村)
