= Changchun railway station =

Railway station in Changchun, Jilin, China

Changchun 长春
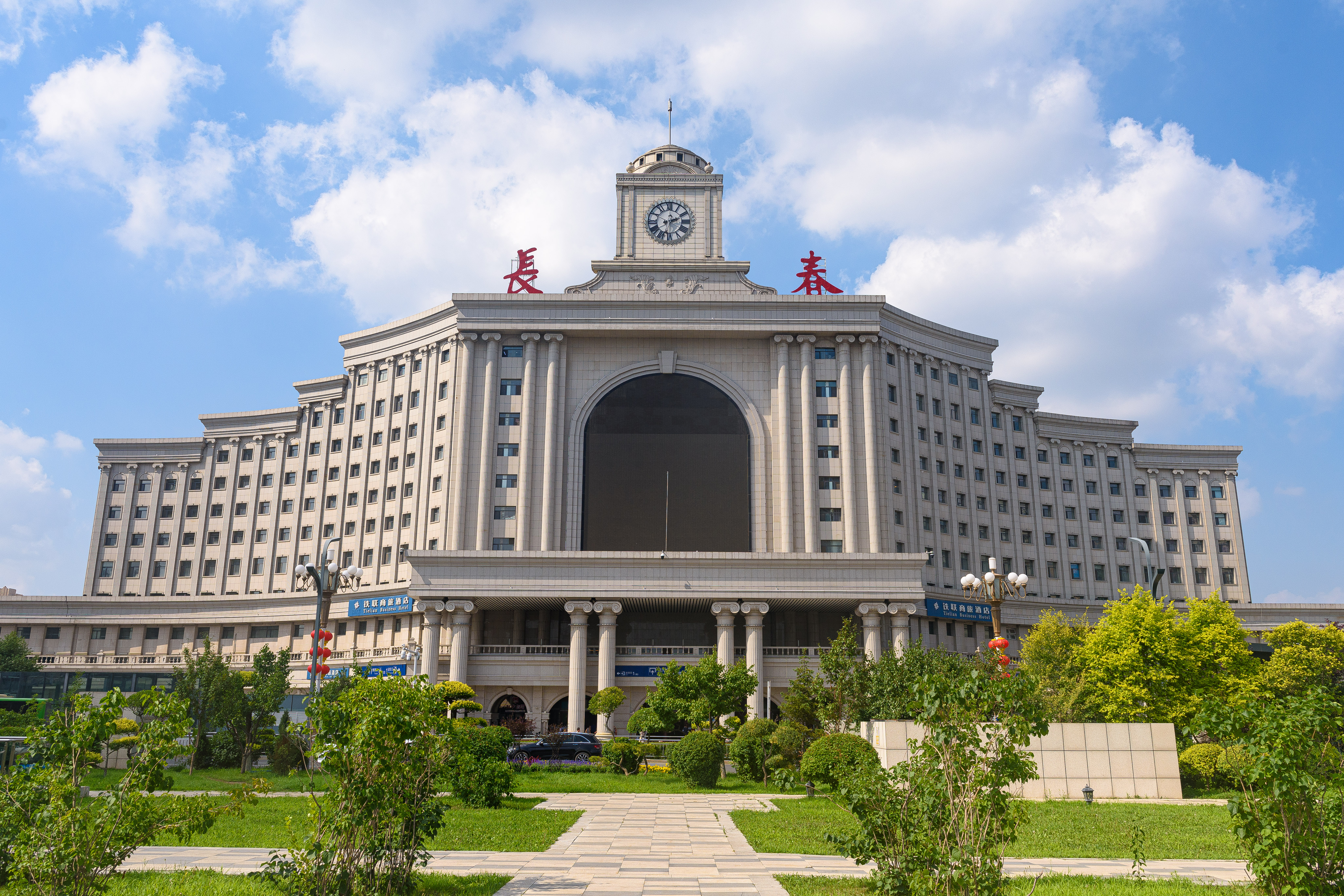
- South facade

General information
- Other names: 长春站 - pinyin: Chángchūn Zhàn
- Location: Changbai Rd., Kuancheng District, Changchun, Jilin; China
- Coordinates: 43°54′29.40″N 125°19′03.94″E
- Operator: CR Shenyang; Changchun Subway
- Connections: Bus terminal

History
- Opened: 1907; 30 October 2002 (south station); 7 May 2012 (north station)
- Former names: Hsinking
Location

Changchun station (simplified Chinese: 长春站; traditional Chinese: 長春站; pinyin: Chángchūn Zhàn) is a railway station of Beijing–Harbin railway, Harbin–Dalian railway, Changchun–Tumen railway, Changchun–Baicheng railway and Changchun–Jilin intercity railway. The station is located in Changchun, in the Jilin province of China. It is served by Changchun Rail Transit Line 1, Line 3 and Line 4.

== History ==
The station opened in 1907. The new station building was constructed in 1994. In 2014, renovations were completed on an expanded station, with additional tracks and a new north building. A new masonry south facade was added.

== Services ==
=== China Railway ===
Changchun 长春
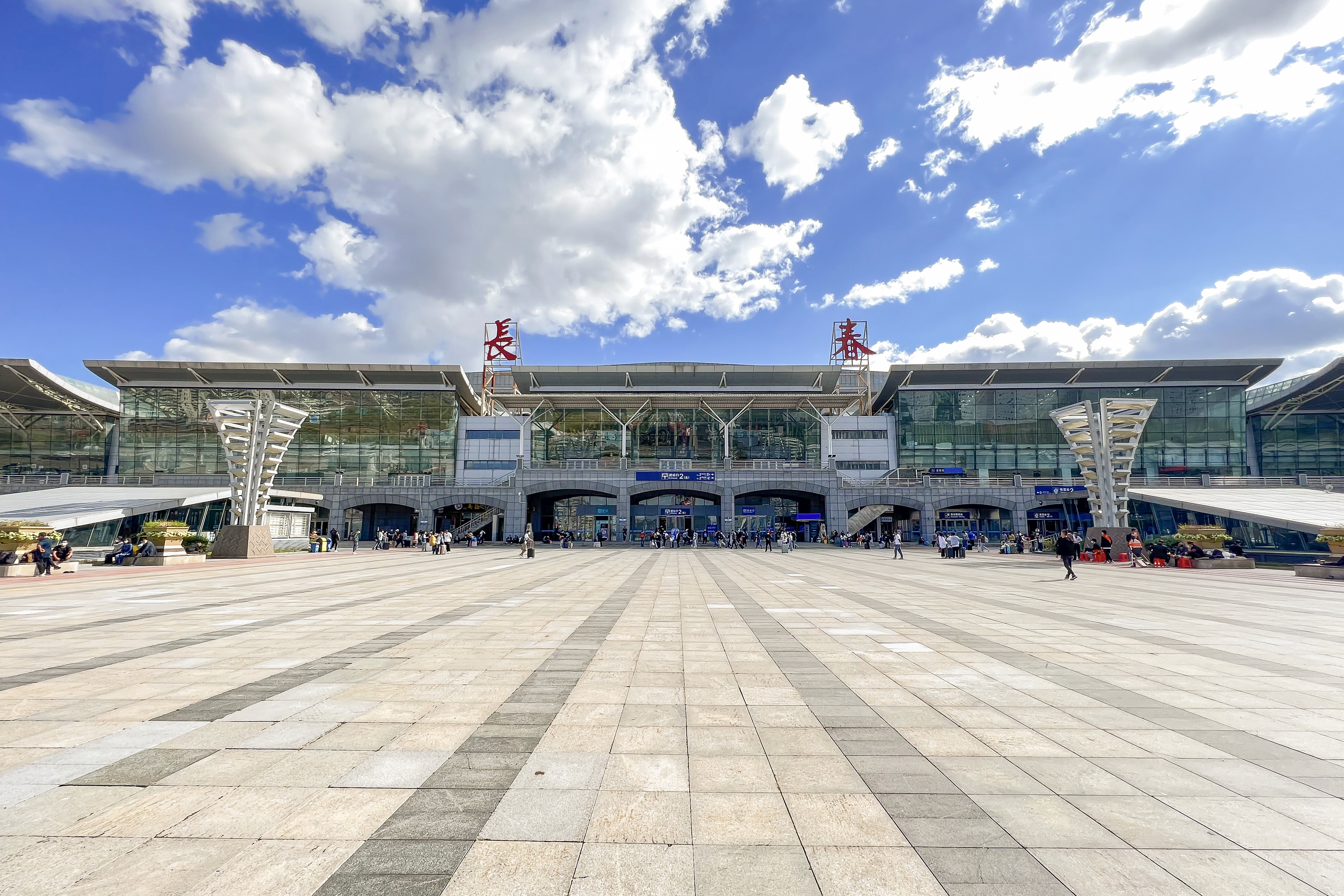
- North facade

General information
- Other names: 长春站 - pinyin: Chángchūn Zhàn
- Location: Changbai Rd., Kuancheng District, Changchun, Jilin; China
- Operator: Shenyang Railway Bureau, China Railway Corporation
- Lines: Beijing–Harbin, Harbin–Dalian, Changchun–Tumen railway, Changchun–Baicheng railway, Changchun–Shuangyang-Mt. Chimney town railway, Changchun–Jilin
- Platforms: 9

Other information
- Station code: TMIS code: 54116; Telegraph code: CCT; Pinyin code: CCH
- Classification: Top Class station

History
- Opened: 1907
- Former names: Hsinking
Location

Preceding station	China Railway	Following station
Changchun South towards Beijing	Beijing–Harbin railway	Changchun North towards Harbin
Preceding station	China Railway High-speed	Following station
Dehui West towards Harbin	Harbin–Dalian high-speed railway Part of the Beijing–Harbin High-Speed Railway	Changchun West towards Dalian

=== Changchun Subway ===
==== Changchun Railway Station ====
Changchun Railway Station 长春站
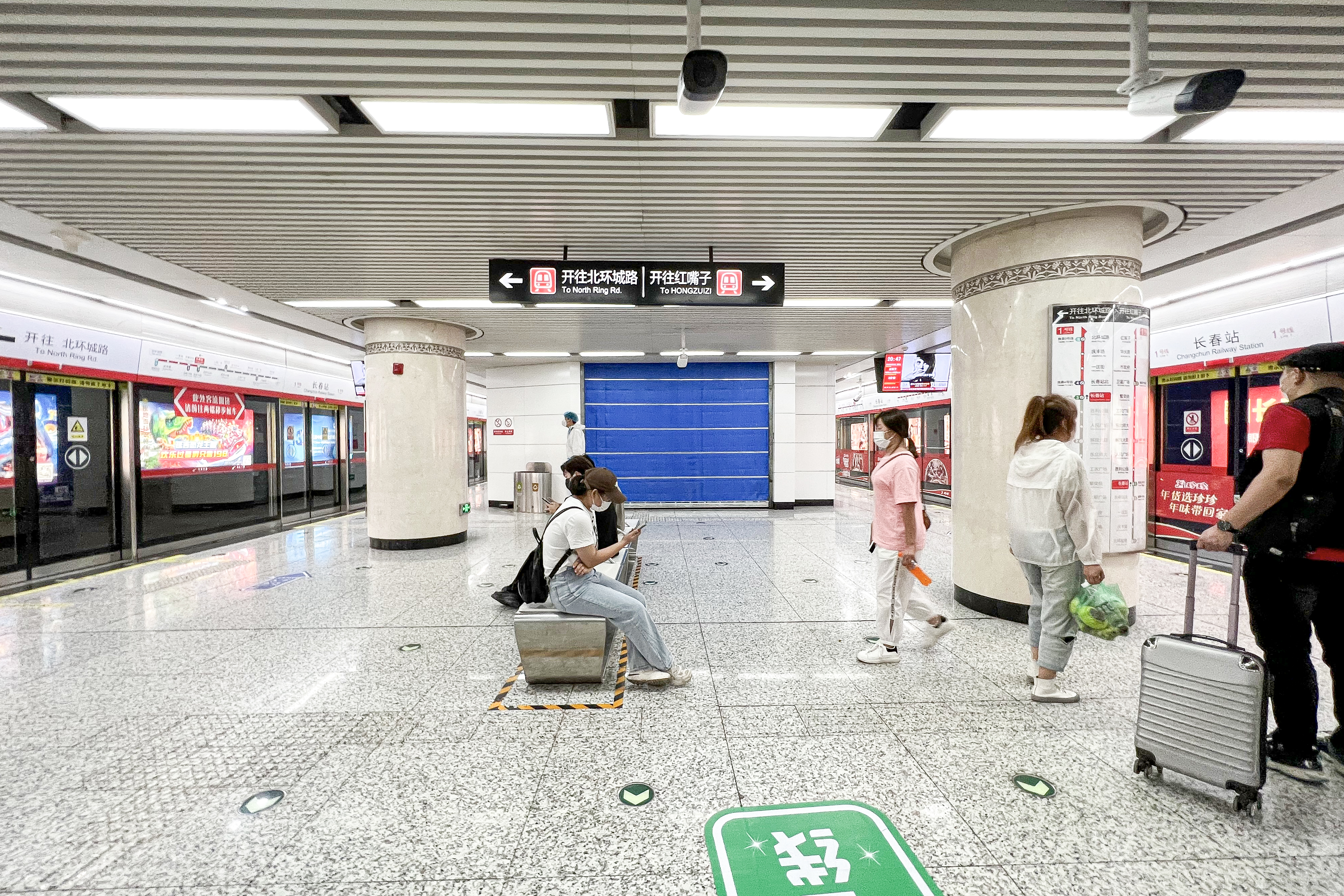
- Line 1 platform

General information
- Operator: Changchun Rail Transit
- Lines: Line 1; Line 3

Services
Preceding station	Changchun Rail Transit	Following station
Changchun Railway Station (North) towards North Ring Road	Line 1	Shengli Park towards Hongzuizi
Dongguangchang towards Puppet Regime Palace Museum	Line 3	Nanchang Road towards Changchun Movie Wonderland
Location

Changchun Railway Station is a subway station on Line 1 and Line 3 of the Changchun Subway in China. It is located in Kuancheng District in Changchun under the building of Changchun railway station southern square. The station first opened on 30 October 2002, when Line 3 was put in operation.

Changchun Railway Station is an underground station with one platform and two side tracks per line. Line 1 runs at the station in the direction north-south, and Line 3 runs west-east.

==== Changchun Railway Station (North) ====
Changchun Railway Station (North) 长春站北
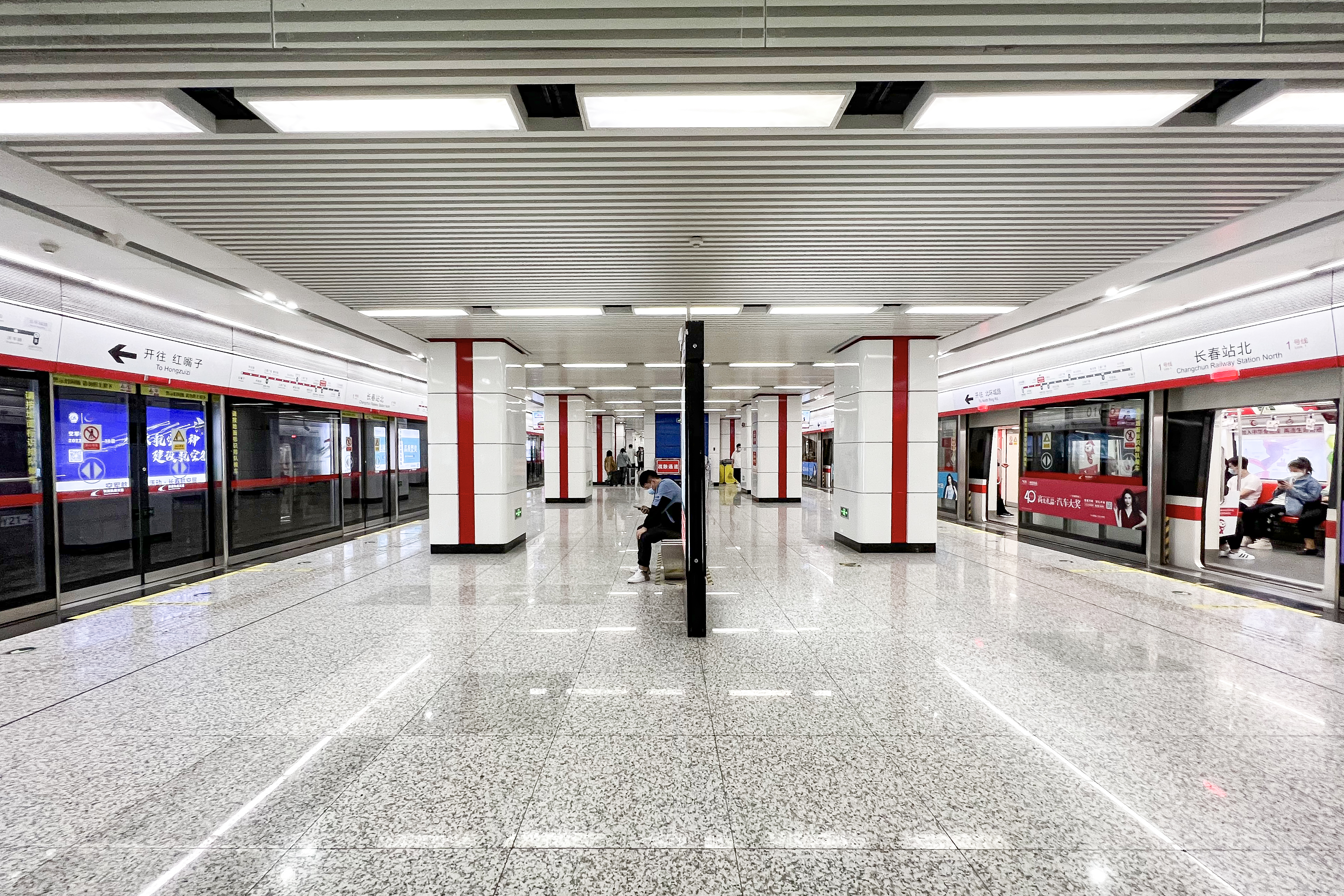
- Platform of Line 1

General information
- Operator: Changchun Rail Transit
- Lines: Line 1; Line 4

Services
Preceding station	Changchun Rail Transit	Following station
Yikuang Street towards North Ring Road	Line 1	Changchun Railway Station towards Hongzuizi
Terminus	Line 4	Beiyatai Street towards Tiangong Road
Location

Changchun Railway Station (North) is a subway station on Line 1 and Line 4 of the Changchun Subway in China. It is located in Kuancheng District in Changchun under the building of Changchun railway station northern square, hence the name. The station first opened on 7 May 2012, when Line 4 was put in operation.

Changchun Railway Station (North) is an underground station with one platform and two side tracks per line. Line 1 runs at the station in the direction north-south, and Line 4 runs west-east.

== See also ==
- Changchun Light Rail Transit
- Chinese Eastern Railway
- South Manchuria Railway
- South Manchuria Railway Zone
