= Dongsheng Subdistrict, Changchun =

Dongsheng Subdistrict 东盛街道
- Subdistrict
- Location in Jilin
- Coordinates: 43°52′46″N 125°22′08″E
- Country: People's Republic of China
- Province: Jilin
- Sub-provincial city: Changchun
- District: Erdao
- Elevation: 206 m (676 ft)
- Time zone: UTC+8 (China Standard)
- Postal code: 130031
- Area code: 0431

Dongsheng Subdistrict (simplified Chinese: 东盛街道; traditional Chinese: 東盛街道; pinyin: Dōngshèng Jiēdào; lit. 'east flourishing') is a subdistrict of Erdao District, Changchun, People's Republic of China, located east of the Yitong River. As of 2011, it has 6 residential communities (社区) under its administration.

== See also ==
- List of township-level divisions of Jilin
