= Chongqing Subdistrict =

Chongqing Subdistrict 重庆街道
- Subdistrict
- Location in Jilin
- Coordinates: 43°53′22″N 125°18′40″E
- Country: People's Republic of China
- Province: Jilin
- Prefecture-level city: Changchun
- District: Chaoyang District
- Time zone: UTC+8 (China Standard)

Chongqing Subdistrict (Chinese: 重庆街道; pinyin: Chóngqìng Jiēdào) is a subdistrict in Chaoyang District, Changchun, Jilin province, China. As of 2018, it has 4 residential communities under its administration.

== See also ==
- List of township-level divisions of Jilin
