= Line 9 (Changchun Rail Transit) =

Metro line under construction in Changchun, China

Overview
- Status: Under Construction
- Owner: Changchun
- Locale: Changchun, Jilin, China
- Termini: Wukaihe Dajie; Jiutai South Railway Station
- Stations: 8 (Phase 1)

Service
- Type: Rapid transit
- System: Changchun Rail Transit
- Services: 1
- Operator(s): Changchun Rail Transit Corporation

History
- Completed: 2027

Technical
- Line length: 30.32 km (18.84 mi)
- Number of tracks: 2
- Character: Underground and Elevated
- Track gauge: 1,435 mm (4 ft 8 1/2 in)

Line 9 of the Changchun Rail Transit (Chinese: 长春轨道交通九号线; pinyin: Chángchūn guǐdào jiāotōng jiǔ hào xiàn) is a rapid transit line running from Wukaihe Dajie to Jiutai South Railway Station including a station at Changchun Longjia Airport. It is under construction and planned to open in 2027.

== History ==
=== Phase 1 ===
Plans to open by 2027, from Wukaihe Dajie to Jiutai South Railway Station.
