= Changchun–Jilin intercity railway =

Railway line in Jilin, China

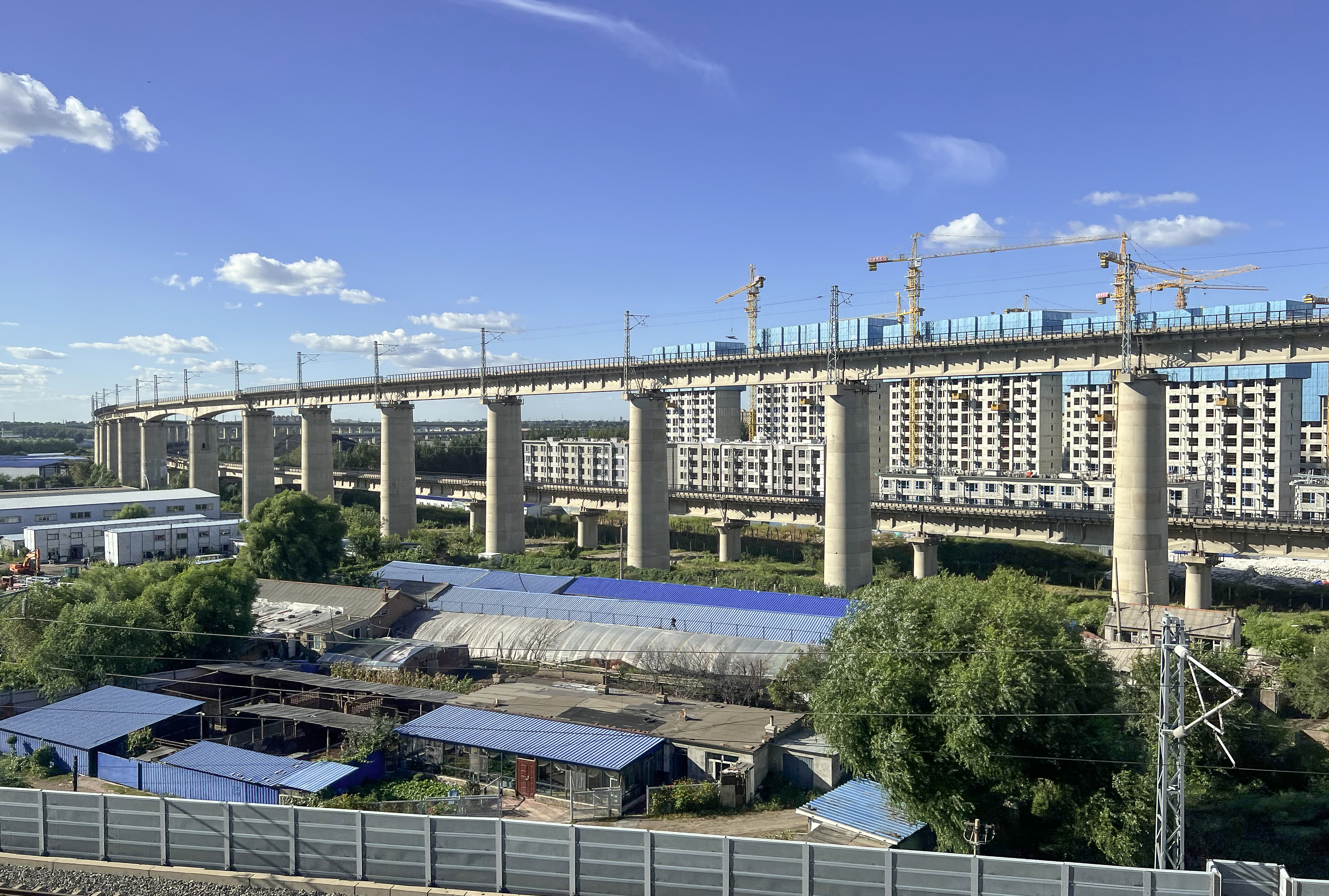
- Changchun–Jilin intercity railway in Changchun

Overview
- Native name: 长吉城际铁路 长珲城际铁路长吉段
- Status: Operational
- Owner: China Railway
- Locale: Jilin province
- Termini: Changchun; Jilin
- Stations: 7

Service
- Type: High-speed rail
- System: China Railway High-speed
- Operator(s): CR Shenyang

History
- Opened: January 11, 2011

Technical
- Line length: 111 km (69 mi)
- Track gauge: 1,435 mm (4 ft 8 1/2 in) standard gauge
- Electrification: 25 kV 50 Hz AC (Overhead line)
- Operating speed: 250 km/h (160 mph)

Changchun–Jilin intercity railway (simplified Chinese: 长吉城际铁路; traditional Chinese: 長吉城際鐵路; pinyin: Cháng-Jí Chéngjì Tiělù) is a high-speed rail line operated by China Railway High-speed in Jilin Province, which opened for service on January 11, 2011. It is the first intercity high-speed rail to be operational in Northeast China. Like the Shanghai–Nanjing intercity high-speed railway, which services Shanghai Hongqiao International Airport, the Changchun–Jilin intercity railway serves as an airport rail link for the cities of Changchun and Jilin.

== Summary ==
The line connects, and terminates at, the cities of Changchun and Jilin. The entire line spans 111 km (69 mi) and was built at a cost of RMB 9.6 billion. Construction began on May 13, 2007, and the line was officially open to the public on January 11, 2011. The operational speed of the network is 250 km/h (160 mph), which means that travel between the two cities now takes about 29 minutes, down from the previous 1.5 hours. The line also services Changchun Longjia International Airport with Longjia railway station, which is nine minutes from Changchun station and 22 minutes from Jilin station.

At Jilin, the line continues as the Jilin–Hunchun intercity railway, terminating at Hunchun railway station.

== Stations ==
The railway has seven stations, of which three are operational, two are scheduled to be operational and two are reserved for future operations. The stations are:

Station Name	Chinese name	China Railway transfers/connections	Metro transfers/connections
Changchun	长春	Beijing–Harbin Railway; Harbin–Dalian high-speed railway	1 3 4
Konggang (reserved)	空港		
Longjia	龙嘉		
Jiutai South	九台南		
Xinhuapichang (reserved)	新桦皮厂		
Shuangji	双吉		
Jilin	吉林	Jilin–Hunchun intercity railway	

== Ticketing ==
All operational stations have both staffed ticket booths and ticket vending machines. As of June 2011, the ticket vending machines can only accept cash (fourth and fifth series renminbi banknotes in denominations ¥5, ¥10, ¥20, ¥50 and ¥100 only, no coins) as payment.
