= Changchun–Baicheng railway =

Railroad line in Jilin, China

Overview
- Status: Operational
- Termini: Changchun; Baicheng
- Stations: 14

Service
- Type: Heavy rail

History
- Opened: 1934

Technical
- Line length: 325.7 km (202 mi)
- Track gauge: 1,435 mm (4 ft 8 1/2 in) standard gauge
- Electrification: 50 Hz 25,000 V
- Operating speed: 160 km/h (99 mph)

The Changchun–Baicheng railway (Chinese: 长白铁路) is a double-track electrified railway in China. The railway is 325.7 kilometres (202.4 mi) and has a design speed of 160 kilometres per hour (99 mph).

== History ==
The line was built by the Japanese in 1934.

Starting in 2014, the railway underwent an upgrade which saw bridges and tunnels built to replace level crossings. The radius of corners was also increased and the line was double-tracked. The refurbished railway was opened in 2017. In 2019, the Fuxing CR200J EMU was introduced on the line.

== Stations ==
The line has the following passenger stations:

- Changchun
- Kai'an
- Huaijia
- Nong'an
- Halahai
- Wangfu
- Songyuan
- Chaganhu
- Changshantun
- Da'an
- Liangjia
- Anguan
- Daobao
- Baicheng
