= Changchun Tram =

Tram system in Changchun, China

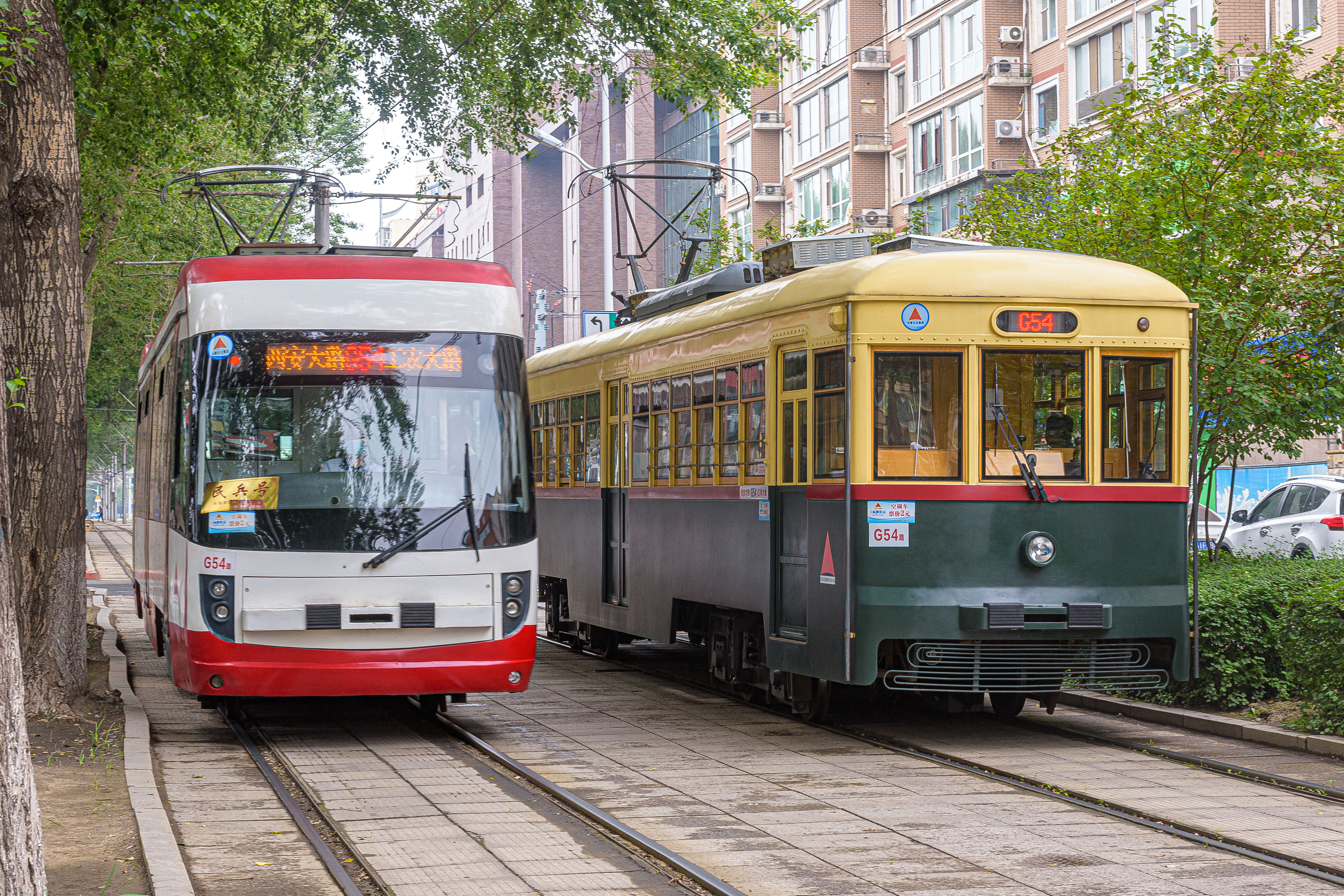
- Two trams (one in historical config) near Changjiu Road station

Overview
- Owner: Changchun Public Transportation Group
- Locale: Changchun, China
- Transit type: Tram
- Number of lines: 2
- Number of stations: 25

Operation
- Began operation: 11 November 1941; 85 years ago
- Operator: Changchun Public Transportation Group Tram Company
- Reporting marks: CT

Technical
- System length: 13 km (8.1 mi)
- Track gauge: 1,435 mm (4 ft 8 1/2 in) standard gauge
- Electrification: Overhead line, 600 V DC

The Changchun Tram is a historic tram system in Changchun, Jilin, China. It was first opened November 11, 1941, and was constructed by the Manchukuo government. On August 15, 1945, the tram had 7 lines and 73 trains. At its peak in 1960, the tram had 6 lines and 88 trains covering almost 53 km (33 mi).

Since the 2000s there was only one line—Line No. 54—which is 7.6 km (4.7 mi) long going from Xi'an Road to Gongnong Road (Hongqi Street). In 2014, a new branch from the existing line—No. 55 opened. It shares the same track from Gongnong Road (Hongqi Street) to Nanyang Road, then runs independently from Nanyang Road to just outside Changchun West Railway Station.

The entire Changchun tram system is operated by the Changchun Public Transportation Group Tram Company, a division of the city's national bus operator, Changchun Public Transportation Group. The tram system also uses the same fare system as the Changchun bus network.

== See also ==
- Changchun, a Capital City of Jilin Province

=== Other Transport in Changchun ===
- Changchun Rail Transit
