= Erdao, Changchun =

Erdao 二道区
- District
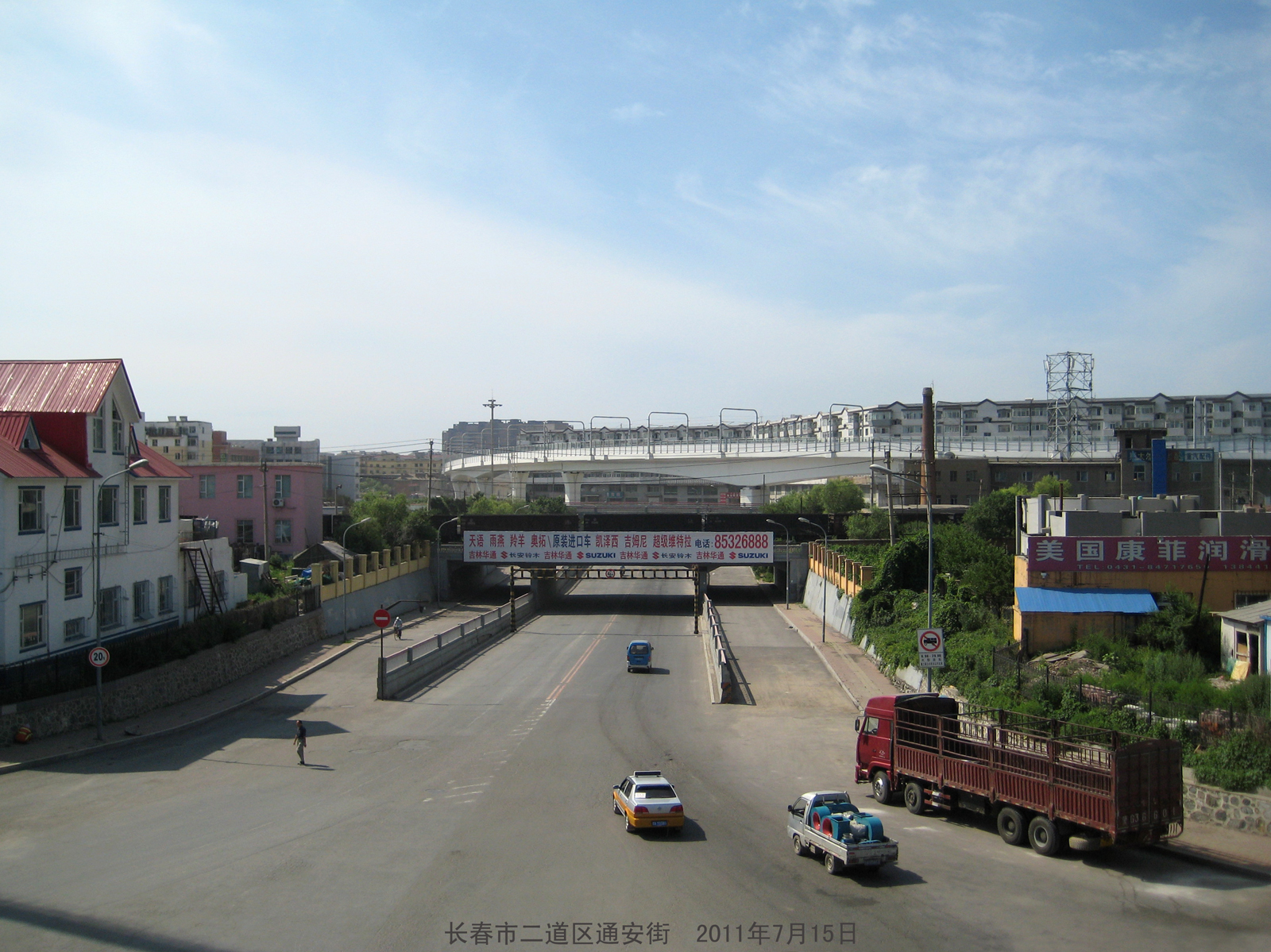

- Location in Jilin
- Coordinates: 43°52′34″N 125°22′26″E
- Country: People's Republic of China
- Province: Jilin
- Sub-provincial city: Changchun

Area
  - Total: 965 km^{2} (373 sq mi)

Population (2010)
  - Total: 619,940
  - Density: 642/km^{2} (1,660/sq mi)
- Time zone: UTC+8 (China Standard)

Erdao District (simplified Chinese: 二道区; traditional Chinese: 二道區; pinyin: Èrdào Qū) is one of seven districts of the prefecture-level city of Changchun, the capital of Jilin Province, Northeast China. It borders Jiutai to the north and east, Shuangyang District to the south, Nanguan District to the southwest, Kuancheng District to the northwest, as well as the prefecture-level city of Jilin to the southeast.

== Administrative divisions ==
There are seven subdistricts, two towns, and three townships.

Subdistricts:

- Heshun Subdistrict (和顺街道), Dongsheng Subdistrict (东盛街道), Rongguang Subdistrict (荣光街道), Jilin Subdistrict (吉林街道), Dongzhan Subdistrict (东站街道), Yuanda Subdistrict (远达街道), Balibao Subdistrict (八里堡街道)

Towns:

- Sandao (三道镇), Quannongshan (劝农山镇)

Townships:

- Yingjun Township (英俊乡), Sijia Township (四家乡), Quanyan Township (泉眼乡)
