= Luyuan, Changchun =

Luyuan 绿园区
- District
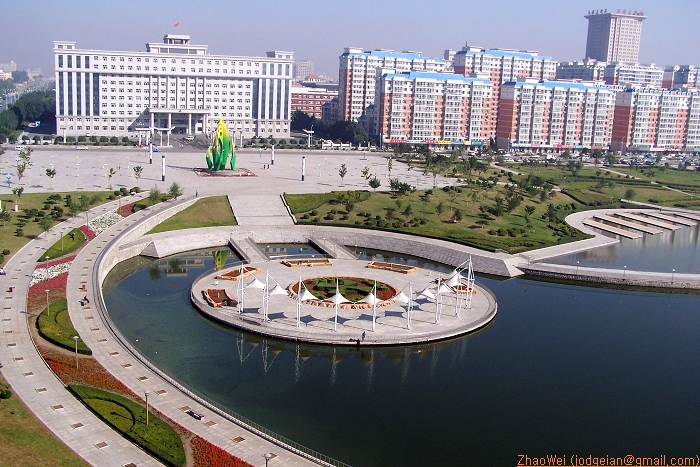

- Location in Jilin
- Coordinates: 43°52′46″N 125°16′19″E
- Country: People's Republic of China
- Province: Jilin
- Sub-provincial city: Changchun

Area
  - Total: 338 km^{2} (131 sq mi)

Population (2010)
  - Total: 810,551
  - Density: 2,400/km^{2} (6,210/sq mi)
- Time zone: UTC+8 (China Standard)
- Postal code: 130062
- Website: luyuan.gov.cn

Luyuan District (Chinese: 绿园区; pinyin: Lùyuán Qū (Note: 绿 in this place is pronounced as Lù, not the normal Lǜ. See, e.g., a local news video at Youku.)) is one of seven districts of the prefecture-level city of Changchun, the capital of Jilin Province, Northeast China, forming part of the city's urban core. It borders Kuancheng District to the north and east, Chaoyang District to the south, and Nong'an County to the north and west, as well as the prefecture-level city of Siping to the west.

== Administrative divisions ==
There are seven subdistricts, one town, and two townships.

Subdistricts:

- Chuncheng Subdistrict (春城街道), Puyang Subdistrict (普阳街道), Zhengyang Subdistrict (正阳街道), Dongfeng Subdistrict (东风街道), Jincheng Subdistrict (锦程街道), Tiexi Subdistrict (铁西街道), Qingnian Road Subdistrict (青年路街道)

The only town is Hexin (合心镇)

Townships:

- Chengxi Township (城西乡), Xixin Township (西新乡)
