= Kuancheng, Changchun =

Kuancheng 宽城区
- District
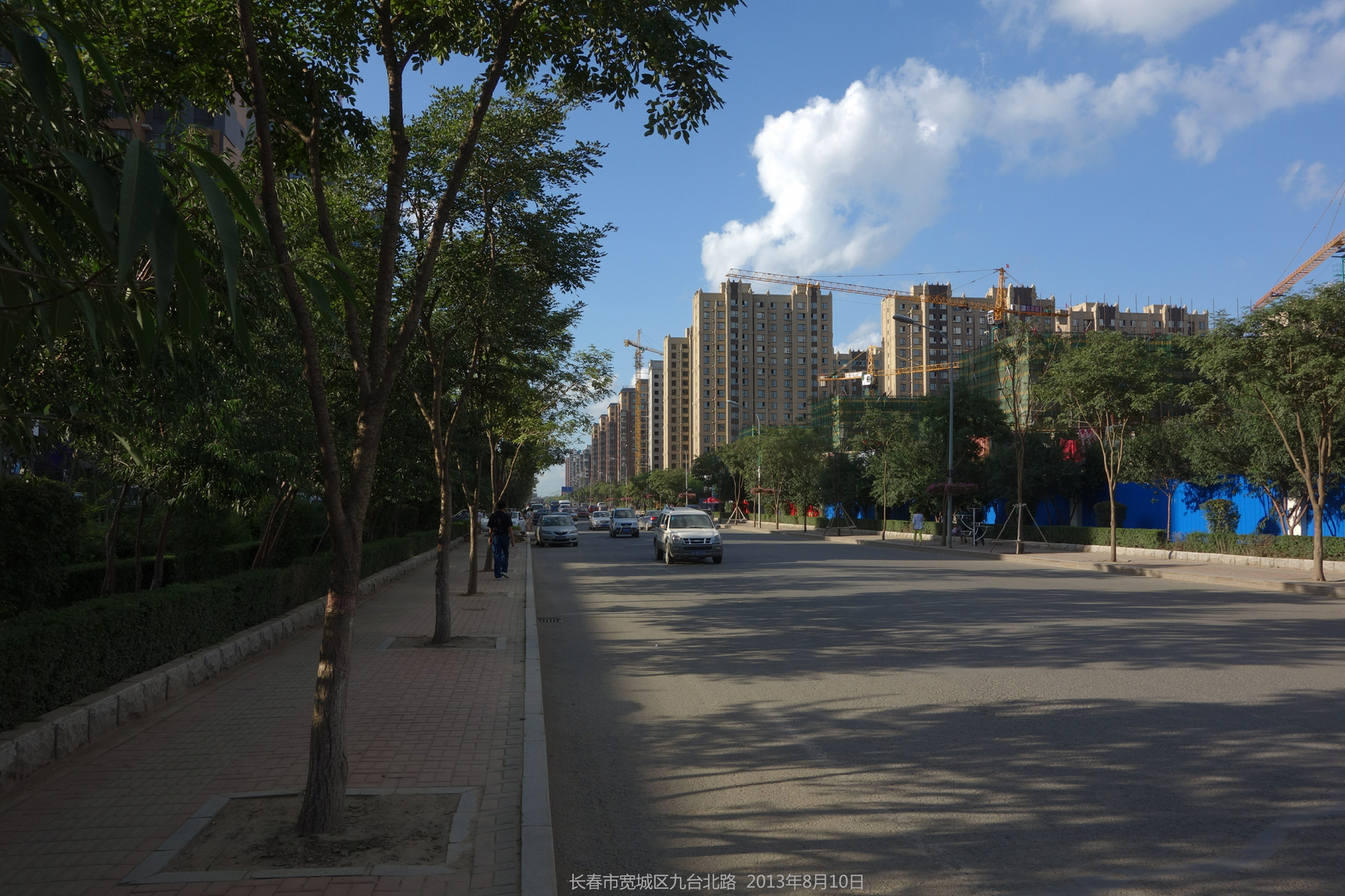

- Location in Jilin
- Coordinates: 43°54′07″N 125°19′42″E
- Country: People's Republic of China
- Province: Jilin
- Sub-provincial city: Changchun

Area
  - Total: 877 km^{2} (339 sq mi)

Population (2010)
  - Total: 680,631
  - Density: 776/km^{2} (2,010/sq mi)
- Time zone: UTC+8 (China Standard)
- Website: cckc.gov.cn

Kuancheng District (simplified Chinese: 宽城区; traditional Chinese: 寬城區; pinyin: Kuānchéng Qū; lit. 'Wide City') is one of seven districts of the prefecture-level city of Changchun, the capital of Jilin Province, Northeast China. It is part of Changchun's main urban area, located north of downtown. It borders Dehui to the northeast, Jiutai to the east, Erdao District to the southeast, Nanguan and Chaoyang Districts to the south, Luyuan District to the southwest, and Nong'an County to the northwest.

== History ==
In May 1898, as Russians were building a railway from Harbin to Lüshun (the southern branch of the Chinese Eastern Railway), Kuancheng became the location of Changchun's first railway station.

After Russia's loss of the southernmost section of this branch as a result of the Russo-Japanese War, the Kuancheng station (Kuanchengtze, in contemporary spelling) became the last Russian station on this branch. The next station to the south - the new "Japanese" Changchun station, just a short distance to the south - became the first station of the South Manchuria Railway, which now owned all the tracks running farther south, to Lüshun. A special Russo-Japanese agreement of 1907 provided that Russian gauge tracks would continue from the "Russian" Kuancheng Station to the "Japanese" Changchun Station, and vice versa, tracks on the "gauge adapted by the South Manchuria Railway" (which happened to be the standard gauge) would continue from the Changchun Station to the Kuancheng Station.

== Administrative divisions ==
There are 13 subdistricts, two towns, and one township.

Subdistricts:

- Xinfa Subdistrict (新发街道), Shengli Subdistrict (胜利街道), Nanguang Subdistrict (南广街道), Dongguang Subdistrict (东广街道), Zhanqian Subdistrict (站前街道), Xiguang Subdistrict (西广街道), Liuying Subdistrict (柳影街道), Qunying Subdistrict (群英街道), Kaixuan Subdistrict (凯旋街道), Xingye Subdistrict (兴业街道), Tuanshan Subdistrict (团山街道), Dong'an Subdistrict (东安街道), Changtong Subdistrict (长通街道)

Towns:

- Xinglongshan (兴隆山镇), Lanjia (兰家镇)

The only township is Fenjin Township (奋进乡)
