= Chaoyang, Changchun =

Chaoyang 朝阳区
- District
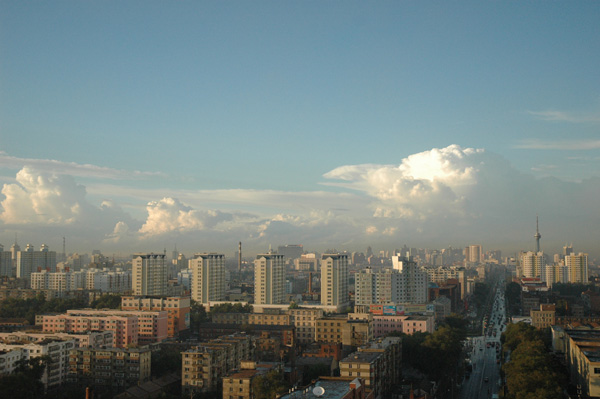

- Location in Jilin
- Coordinates: 43°50′52″N 125°18′12″E
- Country: China
- Province: Jilin
- Sub-provincial city: Changchun
- District seat: Qianjin Subdistrict

Area
  - Total: 346 km^{2} (134 sq mi)

Population (2020 census)
  - Total: 614,021
  - Density: 1,770/km^{2} (4,600/sq mi)
- Time zone: UTC+8 (China Standard)
- Website: www.ccchaoyang.gov.cn

Chaoyang District (Chinese: 朝阳区; pinyin: Cháoyáng Qū; lit. 'Facing the Sun') is one of seven districts of the prefecture-level city of Changchun, the capital of Jilin Province, Northeast China. It borders the districts of Luyuan and Kuancheng to the north, Nanguan to the east, as well as the prefecture-level city of Siping to the south and west.

== Administrative divisions ==
There are 9 subdistricts and 2 towns.

- Qianjin Subdistrict (前进街道)
- Guilin Subdistrict (桂林街道)
- Nanhu Subdistrict (南湖街道)
- Yongchang Subdistrict (永昌街道)
- Chongqing Subdistrict (重庆街道)
- Qinghe Subdistrict (清和街道)
- Hongqi Subdistrict (红旗街道)
- Huxi Subdistrict (湖西街道)
- Fufeng Subdistrict (富峰街道)
- Leshan Town (乐山镇)
- Yongchun Town (永春镇)
