= Nanguan, Changchun =

Nanguan 南关区
- District
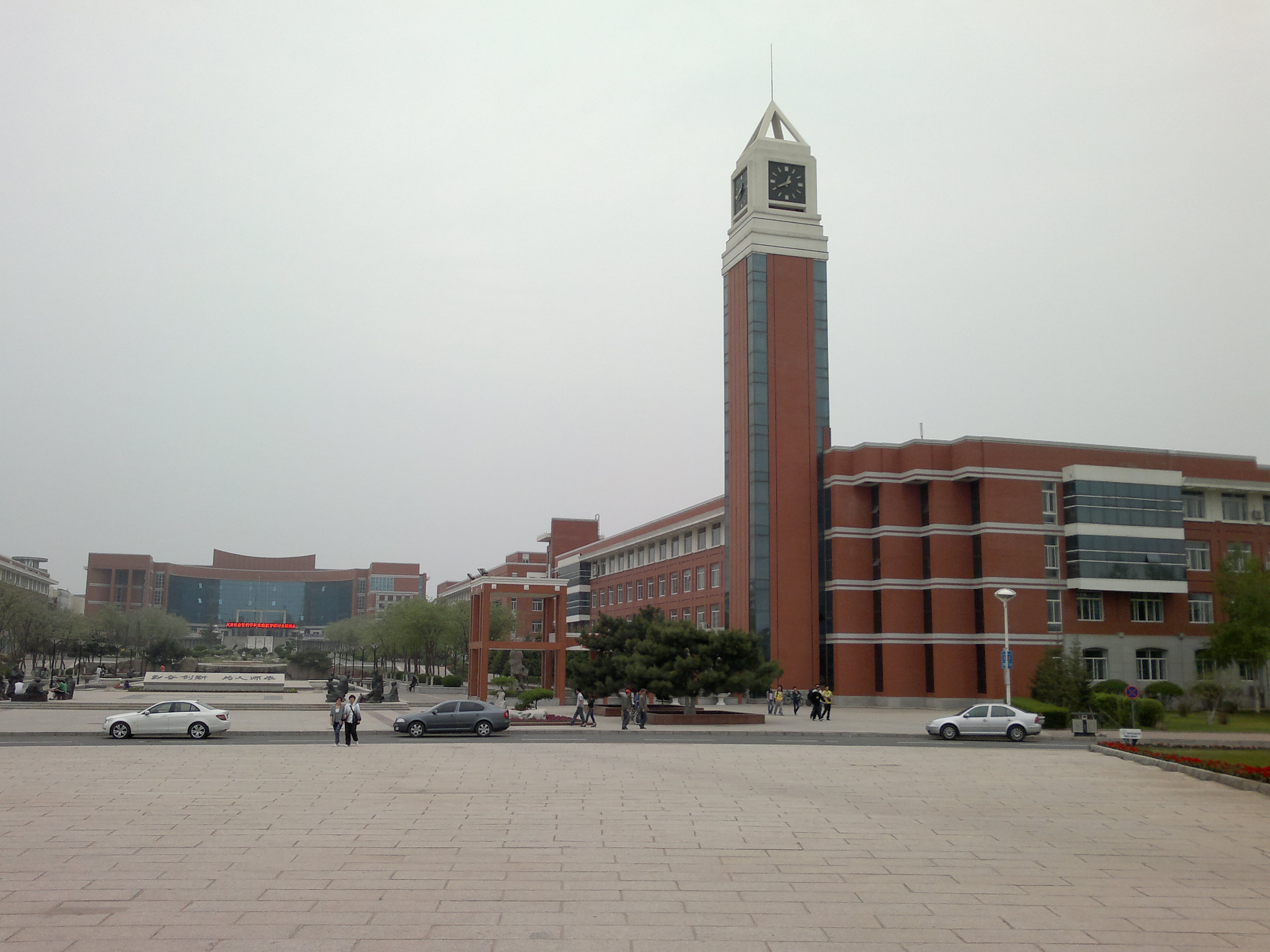

- Location in Jilin
- Coordinates: 43°51′26″N 125°20′12″E
- Country: People's Republic of China
- Province: Jilin
- Sub-provincial city: Changchun

Area
  - Total: 535 km^{2} (207 sq mi)

Population (2010)
  - Total: 876,959
  - Density: 1,640/km^{2} (4,250/sq mi)
- Time zone: UTC+8 (China Standard)

Nanguan District (Chinese: 南关区; pinyin: Nánguān Qū) is one of seven districts of the prefecture-level city of Changchun, the capital of Jilin Province, Northeast China, and forms part of the urban core. It borders the districts of Kuancheng to the north, Erdao to the northeast, Shuangyang to the southeast, Chaoyang to the west, and the prefecture-level city of Siping to the south.

== Administrative divisions ==
There are 12 subdistricts, three towns, and two townships.

Subdistricts:

- Nanjie Subdistrict (南街街道)
- Taoyuan Subdistrict (桃源街道)
- Quan'an Subdistrict (全安街道)
- Yongji Subdistrict (永吉街道)
- Shuguang Subdistrict (曙光街道)
- Nanling Subdistrict (南岭街道)
- Ziqiang Subdistrict (自强街道)
- Minkang Subdistrict (民康街道)
- Panshi Subdistrict (磐石街道)
- Qingming Subdistrict (清明街道)
- Xinchun Subdistrict (新春街道)
- Xiwu Subdistrict (西五街道)

Towns:

- Jingyue (净月镇)
- Xinlicheng (新立城镇)
- Xinhu (新湖镇)

Townships:

- Xinfu Township (幸福乡)
- Nonglin Township (农林乡)
