= Line 6 (Hefei Metro) =

Metro line in Hefei, China

- 6
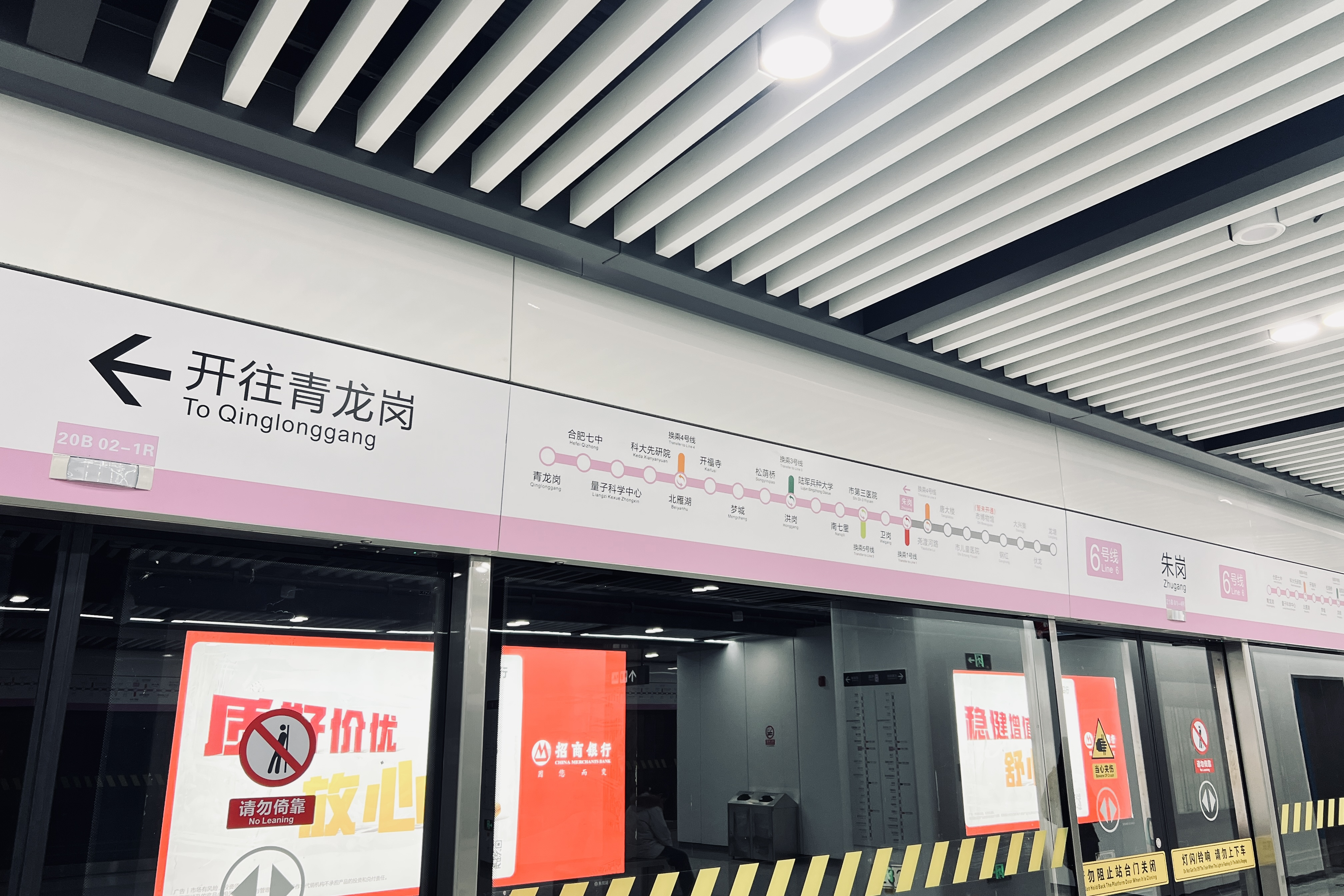
- Zhugang Station platform

Overview
- Native name: 合肥轨道交通6号线
- Status: Operational
- Owner: Hefei Rail Transit
- Locale: Hefei, Anhui, China
- Termini: Longtang; Qinglonggang
- Stations: 22 (21 in operation)

Service
- Type: Rapid transit
- System: Hefei Metro
- Operator: Hefei Rail Transit
- Depot(s): Shi Bowuguan, Longtang
- Rolling stock: 6-car type B

History
- Opened: 26 December 2025; 10 months ago

Technical
- Line length: 34.43 km (21.39 mi)
- Num of tracks: 2
- Track gauge: 1,435 mm (4 ft 8 1/2 in)
- Electrification: Overhead catenary, 1,500 V DC
- Operating speed: 100 km/h (62 mph) (Maximum design speed)

Line 6 of Hefei Metro (Chinese: 合肥轨道交通6号线) is the seventh metro line in operation of Hefei Metro system. Construction started on 31 October 2020 with an investment of 20.585 billion RMB, the first phase opened on 26 December 2025 at 10:00 am with 21 stations in operation, spanning 34.43 km long. As the second line of Hefei Metro system, and also in Anhui province that is a fully automated line (after Line 8), Line 6 adopts GoA4 automation level, which has the highest automation level in the world.

== Stations ==
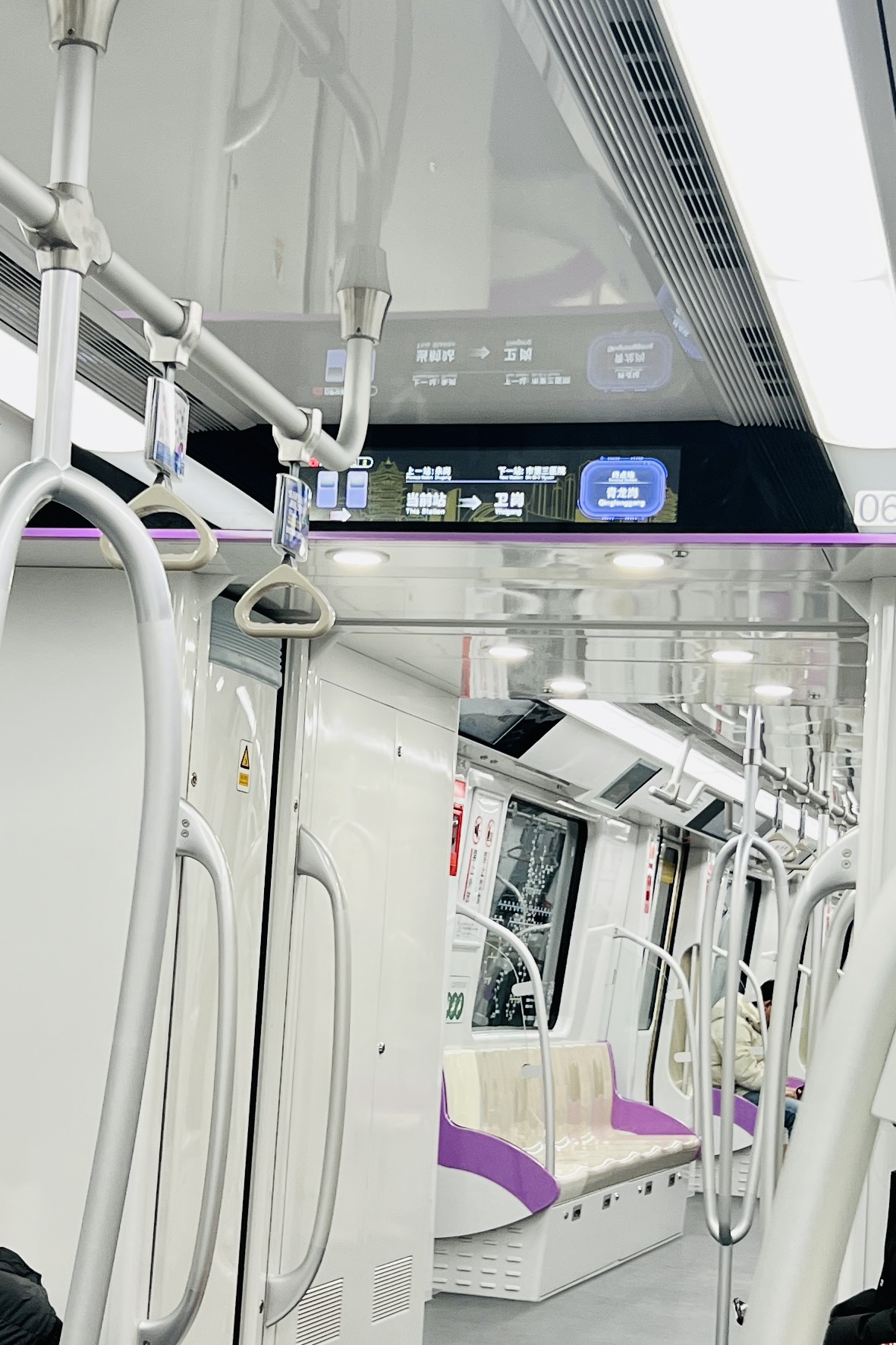
Line 6 train car interior

All 22 stations are underground.

Station name		Connections	Distance km		Location
English	Chinese	Connections	Distance km		Location
Qinglonggang	青龙岗		~	~	Shushan
Hefei Qizhong	合肥七中		~	~	Shushan
Liangzi Kexue Zhongxin	量子科学中心		~	~	Shushan
Keda Xianyanyuan	科大先研院		~	~	Shushan
Beiyanhu	北雁湖	4	~	~	Shushan
Kaifusi	开福寺		~	~	Shushan
Mengcheng	梦城		~	~	Shushan
Songyinqiao	松荫桥		~	~	Shushan
Honggang	洪岗	3	~	~	Shushan
Lujun Bingzhong Daxue	陆军兵种大学		~	~	Shushan
Nanqili	南七里		~	~	Shushan
Shi Di-3 Yiyuan	市第三医院	5	~	~	Baohe
Weigang	卫岗		~	~	Baohe
Zhugang	朱岗	1	~	~	Baohe
Yaoduhe Lu	尧渡河路	4	~	~	Baohe
Tangdalou	唐大楼		~	~	Baohe
Shi Ertong Yiyuan	市儿童医院		~	~	Yaohai
Shi Bowuguan	市博物馆		~	~	Yaohai
Ganghong	钢红		~	~	Yaohai
Daxingji	大兴集		~	~	Yaohai
Fulong	伏龙		~	~	Yaohai
Longtang	龙塘		~	~	Feidong County
