= Line 2 (Hefei Metro) =

Metro line in Hefei, China

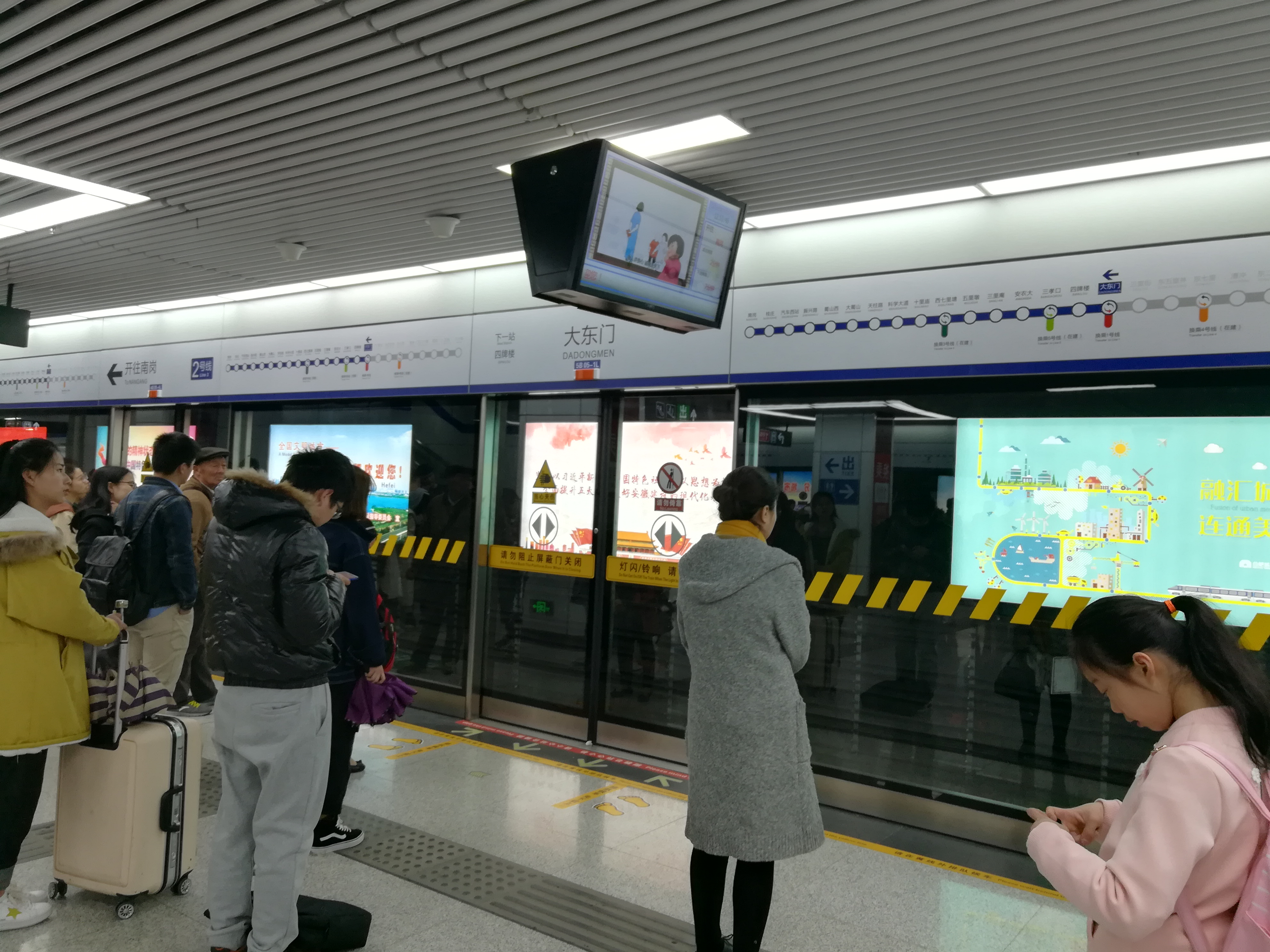
- Dadongmen station

Overview
- Status: In operation
- Owner: Government of Hefei
- Locale: Hefei, China
- Termini: Nangang; Cuozhen
- Stations: 35

Service
- Type: Rapid transit
- System: Hefei Metro
- Services: 1
- Operator: Hefei Urban Mass Transit Corporation
- Rolling stock: CRRC Nanjing Puzhen Metro cars

History
- Opened: 26 December 2017; 8 years ago

Technical
- Line length: 42.76 km (26.57 mi)
- Character: Underground
- Track gauge: 1,435 mm (4 ft 8 1/2 in)

The Line 2 of Hefei Metro (Chinese: 合肥轨道交通二号线; pinyin: Héféi Guǐdào Jiāotōng Èr Hào Xiàn) is an underground metro line in Hefei. The line was opened on 26 December 2017.

== Opening timeline ==
Segment	Commencement	Length	Station(s)	Name
Nangang — Sanshibu	26 December 2017	27.8 km (17.27 mi)	24	Phase 1
Sanshibu — Cuozhen	26 December 2023	14.5 km (9.01 mi)	11	Phase 2

== Stations ==
Station name		Connections	Distance km		Location
English	Chinese	Connections	Distance km		Location
Nangang	南岗		~	~	Shushan
Guizhuang	桂庄		~	~	Shushan
Qichexizhan	汽车西站		~	~	Shushan
Zhenxinglu	振兴路		~	~	Shushan
Shushanxi	蜀山西		~	~	Shushan
Dashushan	大蜀山		~	~	Shushan
Tianzhulu	天柱路		~	~	Shushan
Kexuedadao	科学大道		~	~	Shushan
Shilimiao	十里庙		~	~	Shushan
Xiqilitang	西七里塘	3	~	~	Shushan
Wulidun	五里墩	S1	~	~	Shushan
Sanli'an	三里庵		~	~	Shushan
Annongda	安农大		~	~	Shushan
Sanxiaokou	三孝口	5	~	~	Luyang
Sipailou	四牌楼		~	~	Luyang
Dadongmen	大东门	1	~	~	Yaohai
Sanlijie	三里街		~	~	Yaohai
Dongwulijing	东五里井		~	~	Yaohai
Dongqili	东七里	4	~	~	Yaohai
Caochong	漕冲		~	~	Yaohai
Dong'ershibu	东二十埠		~	~	Yaohai
Longgang	龙岗		~	~	Yaohai
Wanggang	王岗		~	~	Yaohai
Sanshibu	三十埠		~	~	Yaohai
Sanshibudong	三十埠东		~	~	Feidong
Xianghe	祥和		~	~	Feidong
Guiwang	桂王		~	~	Feidong
Duihe	对河		~	~	Feidong
Dianbuhe	店埠河		~	~	Feidong
Paitou	排头		~	~	Feidong
Feidong Zhan (Feidong Railway Station)	肥东站	Feidong	~	~	Feidong
Hemuhu	和睦湖		~	~	Feidong
Maqiao	马桥		~	~	Feidong
Nanshahe	南沙河		~	~	Feidong
Cuozhen	撮镇		~	~	Feidong
