= Line 5 (Hefei Metro) =

Metro line in Hefei, China

Overview
- Native name: 合肥轨道交通5号线
- Status: Operational
- Locale: Hefei, Anhui, China
- Termini: Jiqiao Lu; Guiyang Lu
- Stations: 33

Service
- Type: Rapid transit
- System: Hefei Metro

History
- Opened: 26 December 2020; 5 years ago

Technical
- Line length: 40.7 km (25.3 mi)
- Track gauge: 1,435 mm (4 ft 8 1/2 in)

Hefei Metro Line 5 is a metro line in Hefei, Anhui, China. South section of Phase 1 opened on 26 December 2020. The north section of Phase 1 opened on 26 December 2022.

== Opening timeline ==
Segment	Commencement	Length	Station(s)	Name
Wanghuchengxi — Guiyang Lu	26 December 2020	25.2 km (15.7 mi)	20	Phase 1
Jiqiao Lu — Wanghuchengxi	26 December 2022	15.5 km (9.6 mi)	13	Phase 1

== Stations ==
Station name		Connections	Distance km	Location
English	Chinese	Connections	Distance km	Location
Jiqiao Lu	汲桥路			Luyang
Liuzhong Linghu Xiaoqu	六中菱湖校区	8		Luyang
Linghu Gongyuan	菱湖公园			Luyang
Beiwulijing	北五里井			Luyang
Haitang	海棠	3		Luyang
Baishuiba	白水坝			Luyang
Xinghua Gongyuan	杏花公园			Luyang
Sanxiaokou	三孝口	2		Luyang
Daoxianglou	稻香楼			Shushan
Zhongguo Keda Dongqu	中国科大东区			Baohe
Shi Di-3 Yiyuan	市第三医院	6		Baohe
Xiuning Lu	休宁路			Baohe
Lingdatang	凌大塘			Baohe
Wanghuchengxi	望湖城西			Baohe
Hefeinan Railway Station	合肥南站	1 4 ENH		Baohe
Shengda	盛大			Baohe
Baoheyuan	包河苑			Baohe
Yixing	义兴			Baohe
Dalianlu	大连路			Baohe
Huayuandadao	花园大道			Baohe
Huanghelu	黄河路			Baohe
Yangzijianglu	扬子江路			Baohe
Yicheng	义城	7		Baohe
Shengxingzhengzhongxindong	省行政中心东			Baohe
Fangxinghu	方兴湖			Baohe
Dujiangjinianguan	渡江纪念馆			Baohe
Shenwan	沈湾			Baohe
Huashanlu	华山路			Baohe
Yungulu	云谷路	1		Baohe
Qingshuichong	清水冲			Baohe
Yunchuan Gongyuan	云川公园			Baohe
Binhu Zhuyuan	滨湖竹园			Baohe
Guiyang Lu	贵阳路			Baohe
