= Line 4 (Hefei Metro) =

Metro line in Hefei, China

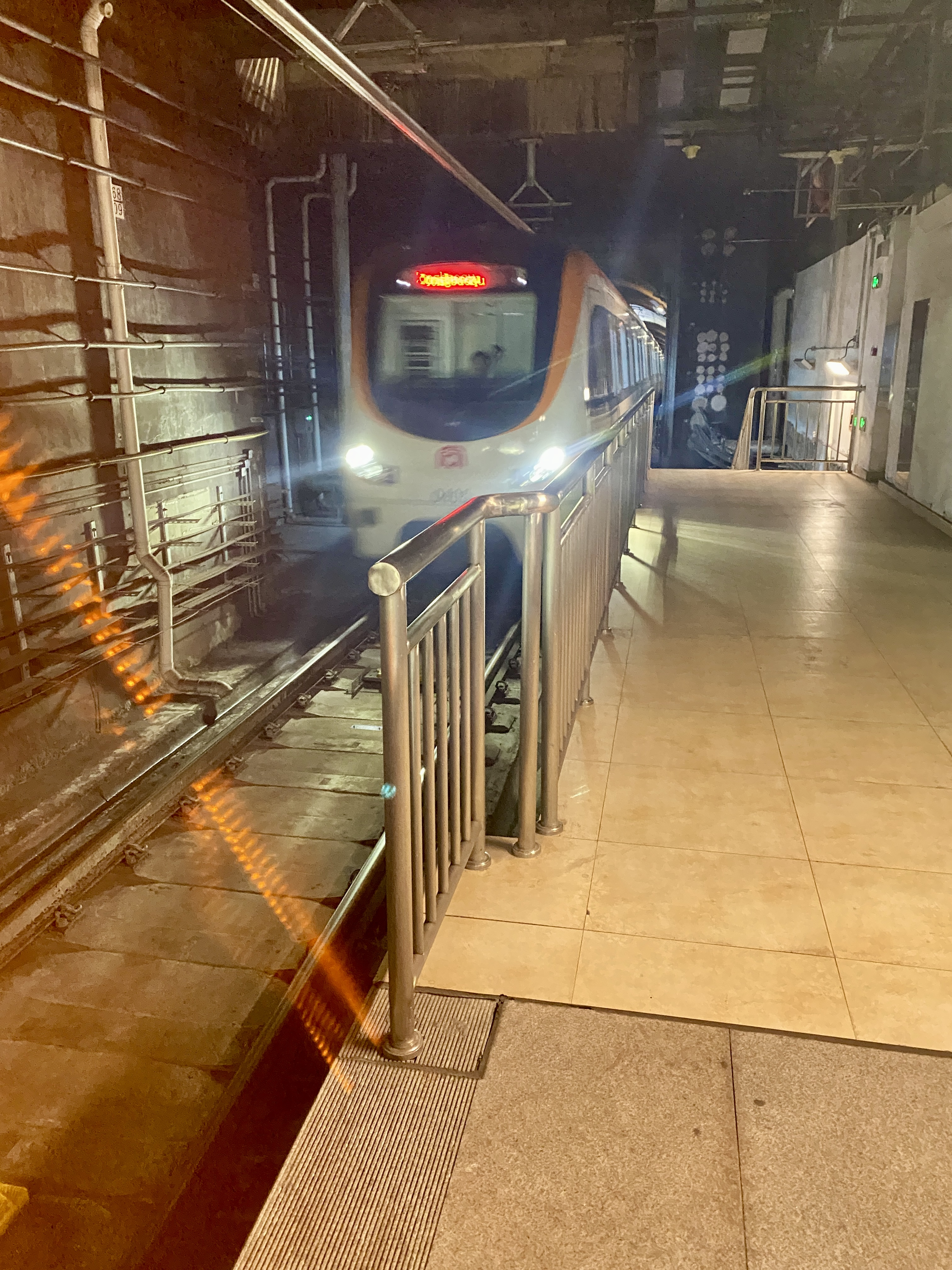
- Hefei Metro Line 4 train

Overview
- Native name: 合肥轨道交通4号线
- Status: Operational
- Locale: Hefei, Anhui, China
- Termini: Zongbaoqu; Shaomaigang
- Stations: 34

Service
- Type: Rapid transit
- System: Hefei Metro

History
- Opened: 26 December 2021; 4 years ago

Technical
- Line length: 45.99 km (28.58 mi)
- Track gauge: 1,435 mm (4 ft 8 1/2 in)

Hefei Metro Line 4 is a metro line in Hefei, Anhui, China, which opened on 26 December 2021.

== History ==
Construction of the phase 1 of line 4 started on 5 January 2017. Test run started on 1 September 2021. On 26 December, line 4 started its initial operation.

A southern extension started its construction works on 31 October 2020. Test run of southern extension started on 2 December 2023. It's opened on 1 May 2024, except Ziyunhu which its TOD programmes are not yet completed.

== Opening timeline ==
Segment	Commencement	Length	Station(s)	Name
Zongbaoqu — Qinglonggang	26 December 2021	41.4 km (25.72 mi)	31	Phase 1
Beiyanhu — Shaomaigang	1 May 2024	13.97 km (8.68 mi)	7	Southern extension
Shaomaigang — Ziyunhu	Under construction	13.97 km (8.68 mi)	1	Southern extension

== Stations ==
=== Line 4 ===
Station name		Connections	Distance km	Location
English	Chinese	Connections	Distance km	Location
Zongbaoqu	综保区			Yaohai
Anyi 1 Fuyuan Beiqu	安医一附院北区			Yaohai
Taochonghudong	陶冲湖东			Yaohai
Shilicun	十里村			Yaohai
Xinhai Gongyuan	新海公园			Yaohai
Fangmiao	方庙	3		Yaohai
Zhantang	站塘			Yaohai
Dongqili	东七里	2		Yaohai
Tangqiao	唐桥			Yaohai
Wulimiao	五里庙			Baohe
Yaoduhe Lu	尧渡河路	6		Baohe
Gongjing Xueyuan	工经学院			Baohe
Gedadiannan	葛大店南			Baohe
Wanghuchengnan	望湖城南			Baohe
Hefeinan Railway Station	合肥南站	1 5 ENH		Baohe
Feinan	淝南			Baohe
Zhuxi	竹西			Baohe
Xuehe	薛河			Baohe
Nanping Lu	南屏路			Baohe
Yaogongmiao	姚公庙			Baohe
Tian'ehudong	天鹅湖东			Shushan
Tian'ehu	天鹅湖			Shushan
Tushuguan	图书馆	3		Shushan
Liushutang	柳树塘			Shushan
Jingui	金桂			Feixi
Yulan Dadao	玉兰大道			Shushan
Beiyanhu	北雁湖	6		Shushan
Fuxingji	复兴集			Shushan
Chang'anji	长安集			Feixi
Taohuatan	桃花潭			Feixi
Jinxiaoying	金小郢			Feixi
Tongluozhai Lu	铜锣寨路			Feixi
Weizhuang	魏庄			Feixi
Shaomaigang	烧脉岗			Feixi
Ziyunhu	紫云湖			Feixi
