= Line 3 (Hefei Metro) =

Metro line in Hefei, China

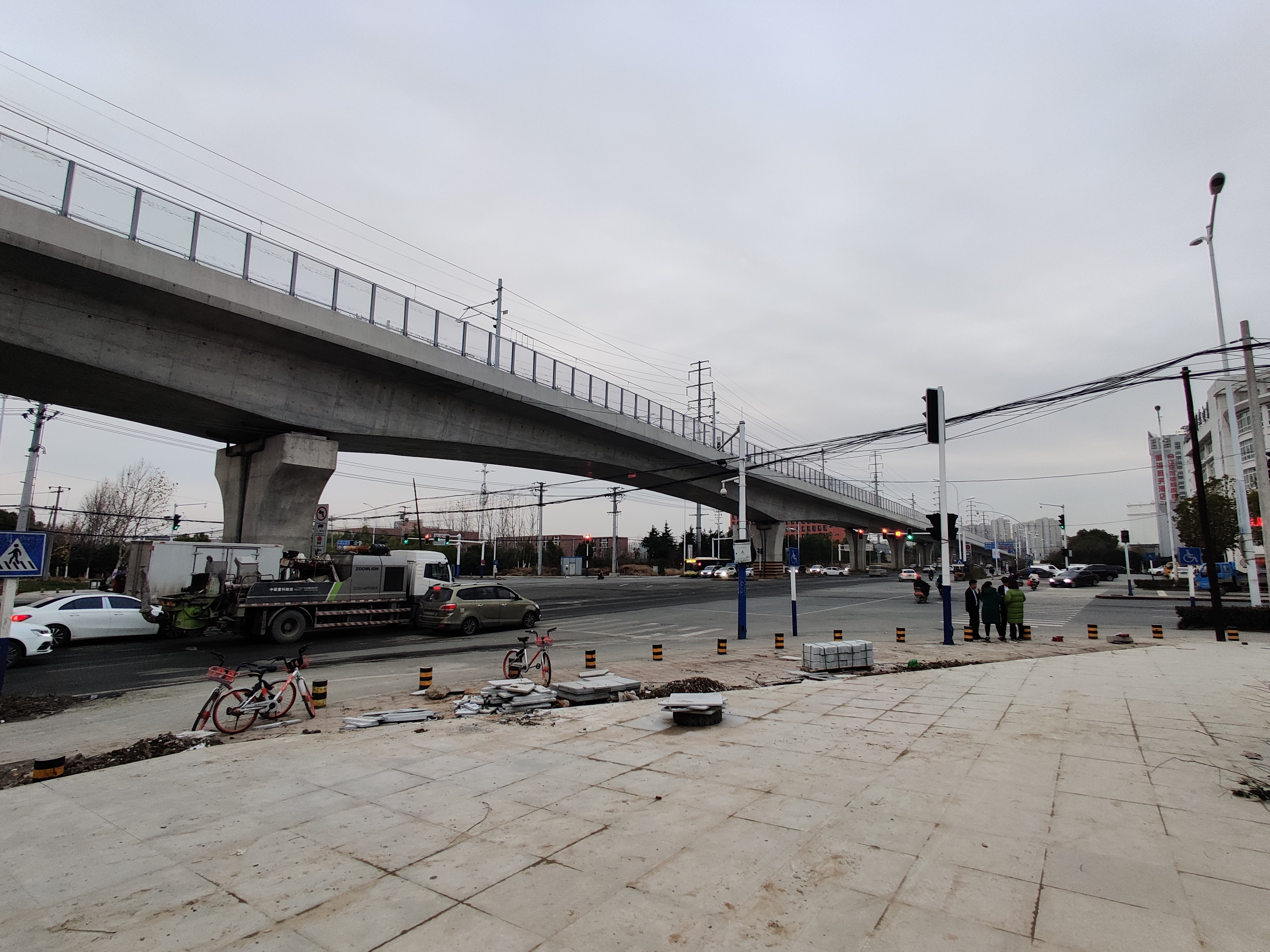
- Elevated section of Line 3 just south of You'ershiyuan station

Overview
- Status: In operation
- Locale: Hefei, China
- Termini: Xiangchenglu; Sheng Ertong Yiyuan Xinqu
- Stations: 40

Service
- Type: Rapid transit
- System: Hefei Metro

History
- Opened: 26 December 2019

Technical
- Line length: 48.5 km (30.14 mi)
- Character: Underground and elevated
- Track gauge: 1,435 mm (4 ft 8 1/2 in)

Line 3 of Hefei Metro (Chinese: 合肥轨道交通三号线; pinyin: Héféi Guǐdào Jiāotōng Sān Hào Xiàn) is a metro line in Hefei. The line opened on 26 December 2019.

== Opening timeline ==
Segment	Commencement	Length	Station(s)	Name
Xiangchenglu — Xingfuba	26 December 2019	37.2 km (23.12 mi)	33	Phase 1
Xingfuba — Sheng Ertong Yiyuan Xinqu	26 December 2023	11.3 km (7.02 mi)	12	Phase 2

== Stations ==
Station name		Connections	Distance km	Location
English	Chinese	Connections	Distance km	Location
Xiangchenglu	相城路			Yaohai
Zhijiaochengdong	职教城东			Yaohai
Zhijiaocheng	职教城			Yaohai
You'ershifan	幼儿师范			Yaohai
Wenhuiyuan	文浍苑			Yaohai
Qinlaocun	勤劳村			Yaohai
Xinhaidadao	新海大道			Yaohai
Douqiaowan	窦桥湾			Yaohai
Fangmiao	方庙	4		Yaohai
Zhusitan	竹丝滩			Yaohai
Hefei Railway Station	合肥火车站	1 HFH		Yaohai
Yalinchong	鸭林冲			Yaohai
Huainanlu	淮南路			Yaohai
Yilijing	一里井	8		Luyang
Haitang	海棠	5		Luyang
Zhenghe	郑河			Luyang
Siquanqiao	四泉桥			Luyang
Xinghuacun	杏花村			Luyang
Hefeixi Railway Station	合肥西站	S1		Shushan
Nanxinzhuang	南新庄			Shushan
Xiqilitang	西七里塘	2		Shushan
Guofangkejidaxue	国防科技大学			Shushan
Honggang	洪岗	6		Shushan
Shizhengwuzhongxin	市政务中心			Shushan
Hefeidajuyuan	合肥大剧院			Shushan
Tushuguan	图书馆	4		Shushan
Shengbowuyuan	省博物馆			Shushan
Anyida'erfuyuan	安医大二附院			Shushan
Fanhuadadao	繁华大道	7		Shushan
Daxuechengbei	大学城北			Shushan
Gongdafeicuihuxiaoqu	工大翡翠湖校区			Shushan
Andaqingyuanxiaoqu	安大磬苑校区			Shushan
Xingfuba	幸福坝			Feixi
Anyi Yifuyuan Nanqu	安医一附院南区			Feixi
Liangting	凉亭			Feixi
Liwan	李湾			Feixi
Sishibu	四十埠			Feixi
Ruici	芮祠			Feixi
Leping	乐平			Feixi
Sheng Ertong Yiyuan Xinqu	省儿童医院新区			Feixi
Guanyi	馆驿			Feixi

== Future Development ==
Guanyi is a reserved station and will not open in short-term.
