= Hefei South railway station =

Railway station in Hefei, Anhui, China

Hefeinan 合肥南
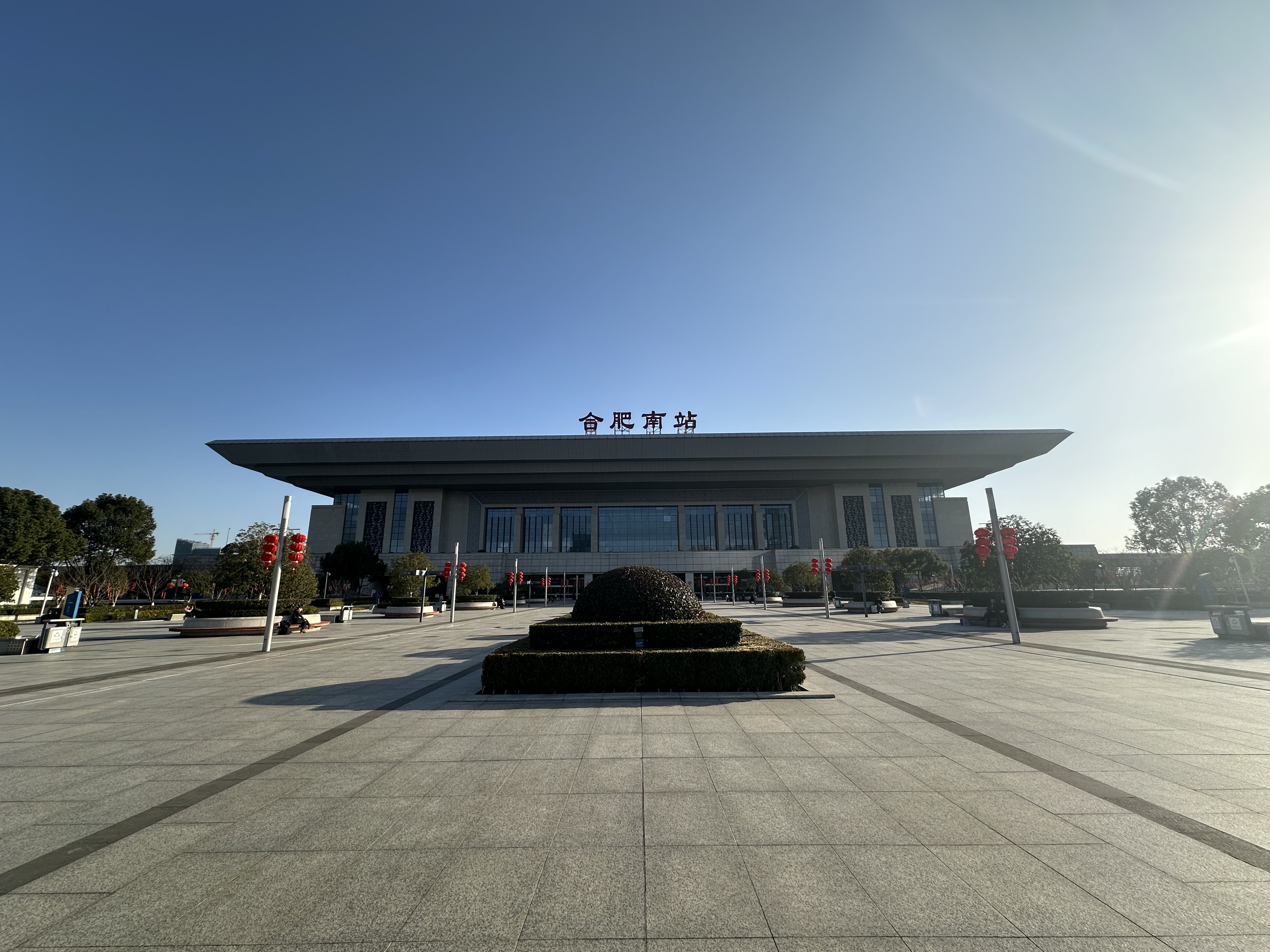
- Hefei South Railway Station in 2024

General information
- Other names: Hefei South railway station
- Location: Longchuan Road, Baohe District, Hefei, Anhui; China
- Coordinates: 31°47′56.31″N 117°17′25.12″E
- Operated by: Shanghai Railway Bureau
- Lines: Hefei–Wuhan railway; Hefei–Nanjing passenger railway; Hefei–Bengbu high-speed railway; Hefei–Fuzhou high-speed railway; 1 4 5 (Hefei Metro)
- Platforms: 22 (main line; 10 island platforms, 2 side platforms; 6 (metro; 3 island platforms)
- Connections: Bus terminal

Construction
- Structure type: Elevated (main line); Underground (Hefei Metro)

Other information
- Station code: TMIS code: 19423; Telegraph code: ENH; Pinyin code: HFN
- Classification: Top Class station

History
- Opened: 12 November 2014 (main line); 26 December 2016 (Hefei Metro line 1); 26 December 2020 (Hefei Metro line 5); 26 December 2021 (Hefei Metro line 4)
Location

Hefeinan (Hefei South) railway station (Chinese: 合肥南站; pinyin: Héféinán Zhàn) is a railway station located in Baohe District, Hefei, Anhui, China.

Hefei South railway station is also a comprehensive transportation hub; passengers can interchange between high-speed long-distance trains, long-distance and local buses, taxi, etc. Hefei Metro Line 1 are located at or near the bottom of station complex Metro station. Line 5 and Line 4 have also reached the centralized transfer center since 2020.

== Station Structure ==
Level 2	Waiting Area	Alighting Platform and Security Checkpoint
Level 1	Platforms	Ticket Offices and Security Checkpoint
Mezzanine	City Bus (Arrival)
Underground	Arrivals Hall	City Bus (Departure); Metro Interchange; Taxi (Departure); Private Vehicle Parking

Preceding station	China Railway High-speed	Following station
Hefei Beicheng towards Shangqiu	Shangqiu–Hangzhou high-speed railway	Feidong towards Tonglu
Terminus	Hefei–Fuzhou high-speed railway	Changlinhe towards Fuzhou
