= Line 1 (Hefei Metro) =

Metro line in Hefei, China

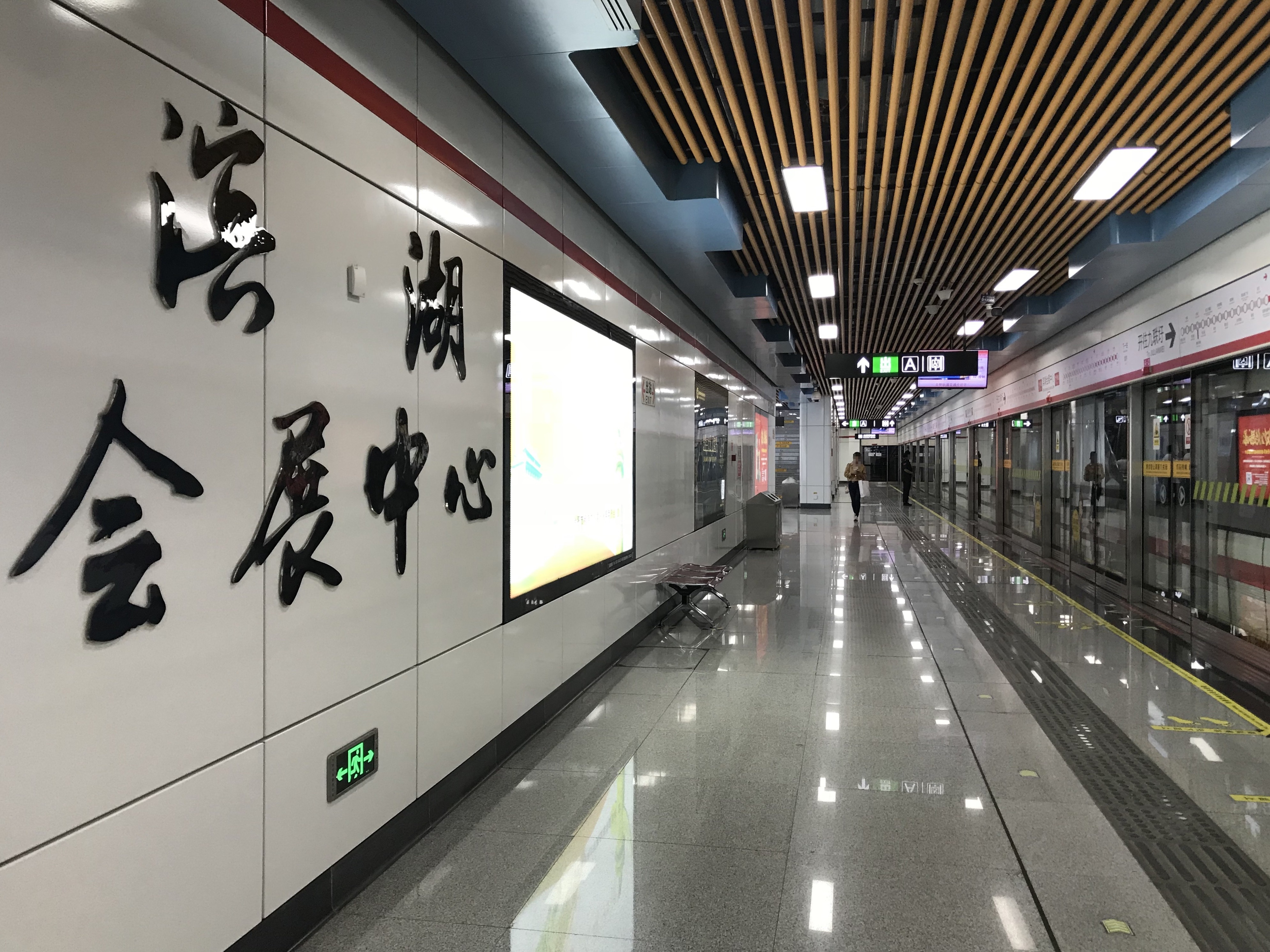
- Platform of Binhu International Convention Center station

Overview
- Status: In operation
- Owner: Government of Hefei
- Locale: Hefei, China
- Termini: Zhangwa; Jiulianwei
- Stations: 26

Service
- Type: Rapid transit
- System: Hefei Metro
- Services: 1
- Operator: Hefei Urban Mass Transit Corporation
- Rolling stock: CRRC Nanjing Puzhen Metro cars

History
- Opened: 26 December 2016; 9 years ago

Technical
- Line length: 29.14 km (18.11 mi)
- Number of tracks: 2
- Character: Underground
- Track gauge: 1,435 mm (4 ft 8 1/2 in)

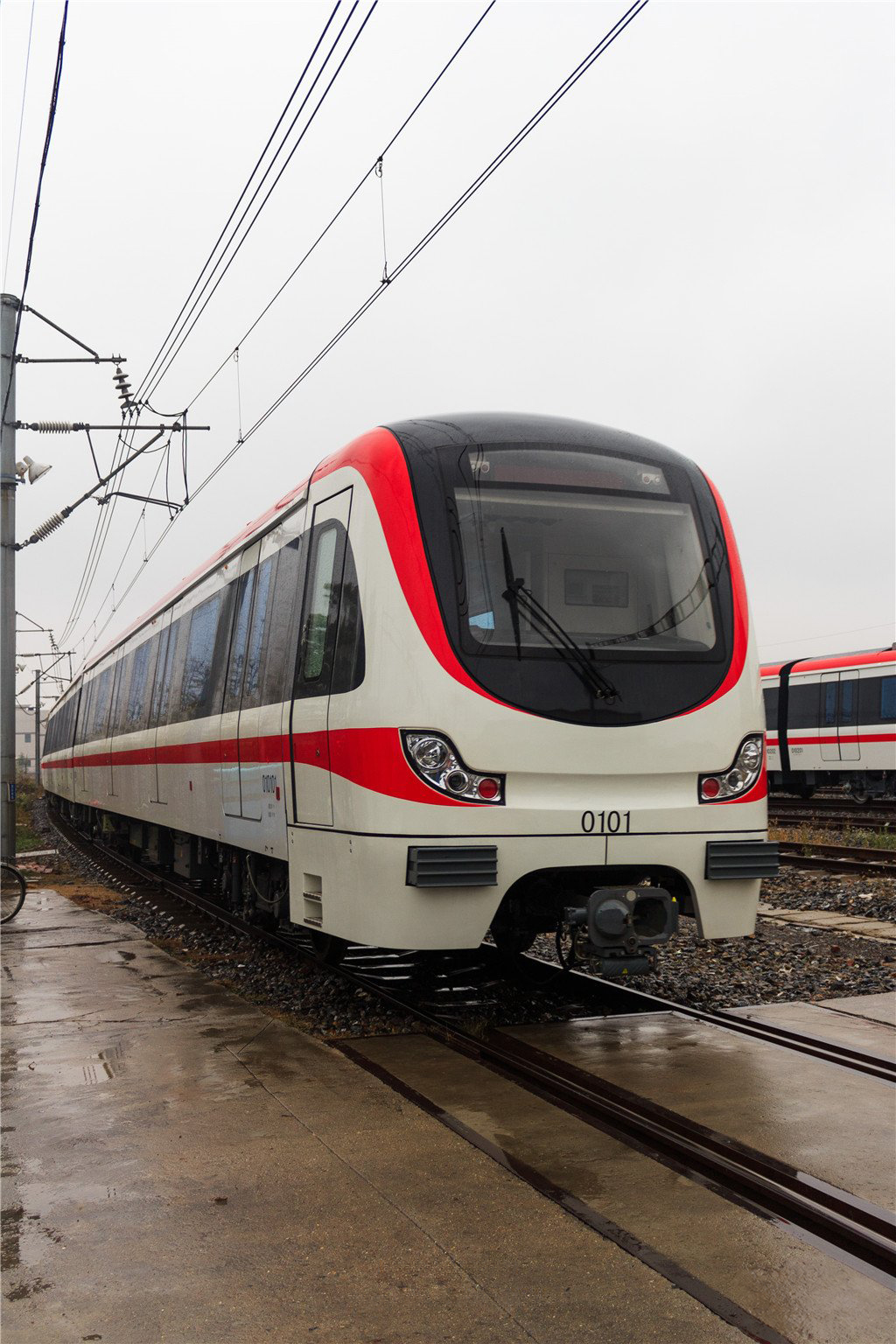
Line 1 train

The Line 1 of Hefei Metro (Chinese: 合肥轨道交通一号线; pinyin: Héféi Guǐdào Jiāotōng Yī Hào Xiàn) is an underground metro line in Hefei. The line began operation on 26 December 2016.

== Opening timeline ==
Segment	Commencement	Length	Station(s)	Name
Hefei Railway Station — Jiulianwei	26 December 2016	24.6 km (15.3 mi)	23	Phase 1 & 2
Hefei Railway Station — Zhangwa	1 July 2023	4.54 km (2.8 mi)	3	Phase 3

== Train service ==
There are 2 types of train services offered on the metro line 1:

- Zhangwa — Jiulianwei
- Zhangwa ← Hefei South Railway Station (only on the last northbound train everyday)

== Stations ==
Service routes		Station name		Connections	Distance km		Location
Service routes		English	Chinese	Connections	Distance km		Location
●	↑	Zhangwa	张洼		0.00	0.00	Yaohai
●	↑	Xinghuayuan	兴华苑				Yaohai
●	↑	Yaohai Gongyuan	瑶海公园				Yaohai
●	↑	Hefei Railway Station	合肥火车站	HFH; 3	0.00	0.00	Yaohai
●	↑	Changhuai	长淮		0.60	0.60	Yaohai
●	↑	Mingguanglu	明光路		0.75	1.35	Yaohai
●	↑	Dadongmen	大东门	2	0.85	2.20	Yaohai
●	↑	Baogongyuan	包公园		1.00	3.20	Baohe
●	↑	Hefei University of Technology South Campus	合工大南区		1.05	4.25	Baohe
●	↑	Zhugang	朱岗	6	1.70	5.95	Baohe
●	↑	Qiupuhelu	秋浦河路		0.95	6.90	Baohe
●	↑	Gedadian	葛大店		1.05	7.95	Baohe
●	↑	Wanghucheng	望湖城		1.45	9.40	Baohe
●	↑	Hefei South Railway Station	合肥南站	ENH; 4 5	0.90	10.30	Baohe
●		South Railway South Square	南站南广场		0.70	11.00	Baohe
●		Luogang	骆岗		1.05	12.50	Baohe
●		Gaowang	高王		1.15	13.65	Baohe
●		Binhu Int'l Convention Center	滨湖会展中心		1.35	15.00	Baohe
●		Zilu	紫庐	7	1.50	16.50	Baohe
●		Tangxihegongyuan	塘西河公园		1.05	17.55	Baohe
●		Jindougongyuan	金斗公园		0.95	18.50	Baohe
●		Yungulu	云谷路	5	1.10	19.60	Baohe
●		Wanda City	万达城		0.85	20.45	Baohe
●		Wannianbu	万年埠		0.70	21.15	Baohe
●		Bingzipu	丙子铺		1.10	22.25	Baohe
●		Jiulianwei	九联圩		1.05	23.30	Baohe
