= Qinlaocun station =

Metro station in Hefei, Anhui, China

Qinlaocun Station 勤劳村站

General information
- Location: Yaohai District, Hefei, Anhui; China
- Coordinates: 31.8989°N 117.3556°E
- System: Underground Station of Hefei Metro
- Line: Line 3
- Platforms: 1 island platform
- Connections: Hefei Bus Wentian intersection Station

Construction
- Structure type: Underground
- Platform levels: 2

Other information
- Status: In use

History
- Opened: December 26, 2019 (6 years ago)
- Former names: Tianshui Road Station
Location

Qinlaocun Station is a subway station of Line 3 of the Hefei Metro in Hefei, Anhui province, China. It was named Tianshui Road Station during the construction.

== Construction ==
The station is located under the intersection between Wenzhong Road and Tianshui Road. It has one island platform. There are 4 exits in total.

== History ==
The station was opened on Dec 26, 2019 as one station on the Line 3. The station as closed on Jan 30, 2020 due to the COVID-19. It has since opened again.
