= Yicheng =

Yicheng may refer to:

- Shi Yicheng (1927–2017), Chinese Buddhist monk, Venerable Master of the Buddhist Association of China
- Hu Yicheng (born 1998), Chinese trampoline gymnast
- Yicheng, Hubei (宜城市), county-level city of Xiangyang
- Yicheng County (翼城县), Shanxi
- Yicheng District, Zaozhuang (峄城区), Shandong
- Yicheng District, Zhumadian (驿城区), Henan
- Yicheng, Hebei (邑城镇), town in Wu'an
- Yicheng, Jiangxi (义成镇), town in Zhangshu
- Yicheng Subdistrict, Hefei (义城街道), in Baohe District, Hefei, Anhui
- Yicheng Subdistrict, Yixing (宜城街道), Jiangsu
- Yicheng Subdistrict, Zhenjiang (宜城街道), in Dantu District, Zhenjiang, Jiangsu
- Beijing Yicheng Bioelectronics Technology Company, manufacturer of medical devices
