= Line 7 (Hefei Metro) =

Metro line in Hefei, Anhui

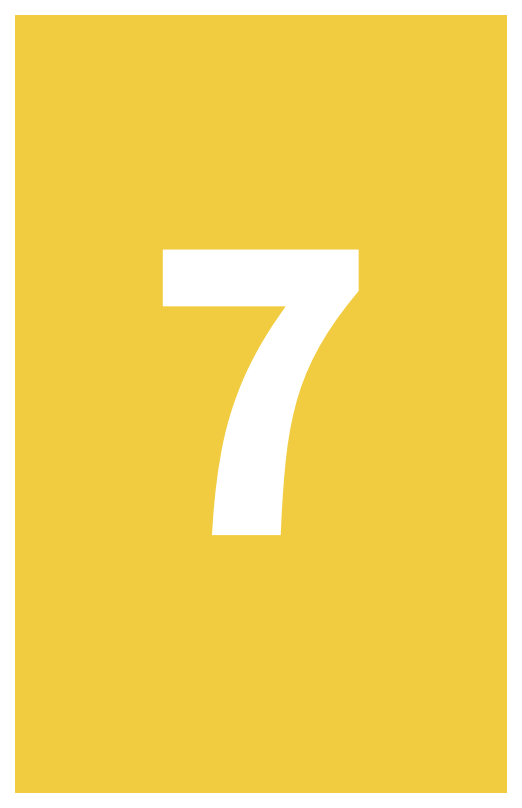

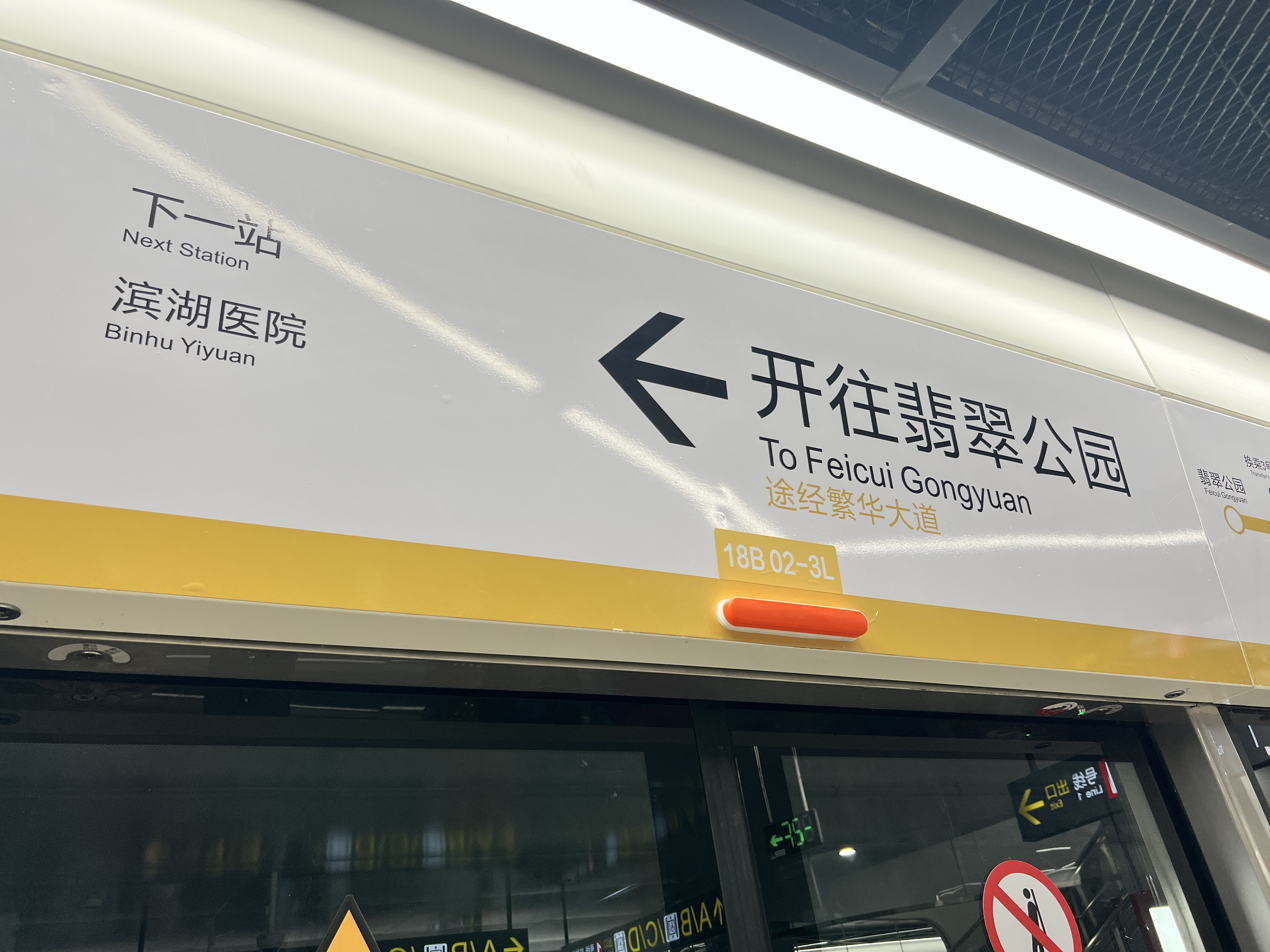
- Zilu station platform, towards Feicui Gongyuan

Overview
- Status: In operation
- Owner: Hefei Metro
- Locale: Hefei, Anhui, China
- Termini: Feicui Gongyuan; Sheng Wenhuahefeiyiguan Hefei Sizhong (Future)
- Stations: 16 (14 in operation) (Phase 1)

Service
- Type: Rapid transit
- System: Hefei Metro
- Operator: Hefei Metro
- Depot: Yicheng depot

History
- Opened: 1 July 2026; 4 months ago

Technical
- Line length: 16.35 km (10.16 mi) (In operation); 18.85 km (11.71 mi) (Total phase 1)
- Num of tracks: 2
- Track gauge: 1,435 mm (4 ft 8 1/2 in)
- Electrification: 1,500 V DC Overhead catenary contact
- Operating speed: 80 km/h (50 mph) (Maximum design speed)

Line 7 of Hefei Metro (Chinese: 合肥轨道交通7号线) is a metro line in Hefei, Anhui province, China. It commenced operation at 10:00 am on 1 July 2026. In the first phase, 14 stations will be put into operation (except the under construction Hefei Sizhong station and Yicheng station, so are unopened). The estimated construction time is 48 months, with total investment of 5.249 billion RMB.

== History ==
On 5 November 2020, Anhui Provincial Development and Reform Commission was approved the feasibility study report for Phase I Line 7.

On 30 November 2020, Line 7 began construction.

On 1 February 2026, Line 7 and Line S1 began trial operation without passengers.

From 19 June to 24 June 2026, Line 7 opened trial ride activity for the public with unlimited rides for free.

Line 7 was opened at 10:00 am on 1 July 2026.

== Opening timeline ==
Segment	Commencement	Length	Station(s)	Name
Sheng Wenhuahefeiyiguan — Feicui Gongyuan	July 1, 2026	16.35 km (10.16 mi)	14	
Sheng Wenhuahefeiyiguan - Hefei Sizhong	Under construction	2.5 km (1.55 mi)	2	

== Stations ==
Station name		Transfer	Distance km	Location
English	Chinese	Transfer	Distance km	Location
Feicui Gongyuan	翡翠公园			Shushan District
Fanhua Dadao	繁华大道	3		Shushan District
Huiyuan	徽园			Shushan District
Mingzhu Guangchang	明珠广场			Shushan District
Tiandu Lu	天都路			Shushan District
Nanyanhubei	南艳湖北			Shushan District
Yiliuba Zhongxue	一六八中学			Shushan District
Hefei Daxue	合肥大学			Shushan District
Nanyanhunan	南艳湖南			Shushan District
Yaosu Dashichang	要素大市场			Baohe District
Binhu Yiyuan	滨湖医院			Baohe District
Zilu	紫庐	1		Baohe District
Songshan Lu	嵩山路			Baohe District
Sheng Wenhuahefeiyiguan	省文化和非遗馆			Baohe District
Yicheng	义城	5		Baohe District
Hefei Sizhong	合肥四中			Baohe District
