= Line S1 (Hefei Metro) =

Suburban metro line in Hefei, Anhui

Overview
- Other names: Hefei Xinqiao Airport Line S1; Airport Express Line S1
- Status: In operation
- Owner: Hefei Metro
- Locale: Hefei, Anhui, China; Huainan, Anhui, China
- Termini: Shengzhongyiyuan Xiqu; Xinqiao 2 Hao Hangzhanlou (Xinqiao Terminal 2)
- Stations: 10 (In operation) 14, includes: 12 (Hefei section); 2 (Huainan section); 26 (long term plan)

Service
- Type: Rapid transit, Airport rail link, Intercity Railway
- System: Hefei Metro
- Depot: Gangji depot

History
- Opened: 19 November 2026; 0 days ago

Technical
- Line length: 31.3 km (19.4 mi) (In operation) 47.5 km (29.5 mi), includes: 36.4 km (22.6 mi) (Hefei section); 11.1 km (6.9 mi) (Huainan section); 69.3 km (43.1 mi) (long term plan)
- Num of tracks: 2
- Track gauge: 1,435 mm (4 ft 8 1/2 in)
- Electrification: 1,500 V DC overhead catenary
- Operating speed: 120 km/h (75 mph) (Maximum design speed); 65 km/h (40 mph) (Average speed)

Line S1 of Hefei Metro (Chinese: 合肥轨道交通S1号线) is a suburban express metro line in Hefei and Huainan, Anhui, China. Trains on the line can reach a maximum speed of 120 km/h, reducing the travel time from Xinqiao Airport to Hefei city center and vice versa to only 30 minutes.

Line S1 is the first intercity rapid transit line in Anhui province to use GoA4 automation level.

== History ==
Construction began on 30 October 2021 with an estimated investment of 22.779 billion RMB.

On 6 February 2025, the tunneling sections from Hefeixizhan to Shihe Lu were successfully connected.

On 1 August 2025, Hefei Metro received the first Line S1 trainset.

On 22 August 2025, the first section successfully obtained single-vehicle certification.

In January 2026, the line successfully passed engineering acceptance, the main track laying was fully connected, and the bidding for power supply system and station equipment integration services was launched simultaneously.

On 1 February 2026, the line began trial operation without passengers, along with Line 7 Phase 1.

On 10 April 2026, the line entered "train testing" mode.

On 16 April 2026, the section from Xinqiao Airport to Xinqiao Industrial Park successfully passed acceptance.

On 18 May 2026, electrical installations of 110KV main substation and six stations passed pre-acceptance inspections.

From 12 November to 16 November 2026, Line S1 began trial rides for the public.

The section from Xinqiao Terminal 2 to Shengzhongyiyuan Xiqu commenced operation on 19 November 2026.

== Stations ==
There are 10 underground stations and 4 elevated stations spanning 47.5 km (including 23 km of underground section and 24.5 km of elevated section) with an average station distance of 3.65 km. The Hefei section is 36.4 km long, with 12 stations (10 underground stations and 2 elevated stations).

Section	Station name		Transfer	Distance km	Location
Section	English	Chinese	Transfer	Distance km	Location
Huainan section	Shouxian Yanliu	寿县炎刘			Shou County, Huainan
Huainan section	Shouxian Jingkaiqu	寿县经开区			Shou County, Huainan
Hefei section	Xinqiao 1 Hao Hangzhanlou (Xinqiao Terminal 1)	新桥1号航站楼	HFE		Shushan, Hefei
Hefei section	Xinqiao 2 Hao Hangzhanlou (Xinqiao Terminal 2)	新桥2号航站楼	HFE		Shushan, Hefei
Hefei section	Yingbin Dadao	迎宾大道			Shushan, Hefei
Hefei section	Weihaihu	未来湖			Shushan, Hefei
Hefei section	Changxinghu	长兴湖			Shushan, Hefei
Hefei section	Weilai Dakexuecheng	未来大科学城			Changfeng County, Hefei
Hefei section	Gangji	岗集			Changfeng County, Hefei
Hefei section	Dayang	大杨			Luyang, Hefei
Hefei section	Luzhou Gongyuan	庐州公园			Luyang, Hefei
Hefei section	Hefei Xizhan (Hefeixi Railway Station)	合肥西站	3 HFU		Shushan, Hefei
Hefei section	Shengzhongyiyuan Xiqu	省中医院西区			Shushan, Hefei
Hefei section	Wulidun	五里墩	2		Shushan, Hefei

== Rolling stock ==
The line uses 4-car type B rolling stock, each car approximately 20 meters long, 2.8 meters wide, and 3.8 meters high. The maximum passenger capacity of the entire trainset is 1,300 people, with a top operating speed of up to 120 km/h. Throughout the train, it is equipped with wireless charging equipment, with 10 wireless charging devices and 18 USB charging ports.
