= Hefei West railway station =

Railway station in Hefei, Anhui

Hefei West 合肥西
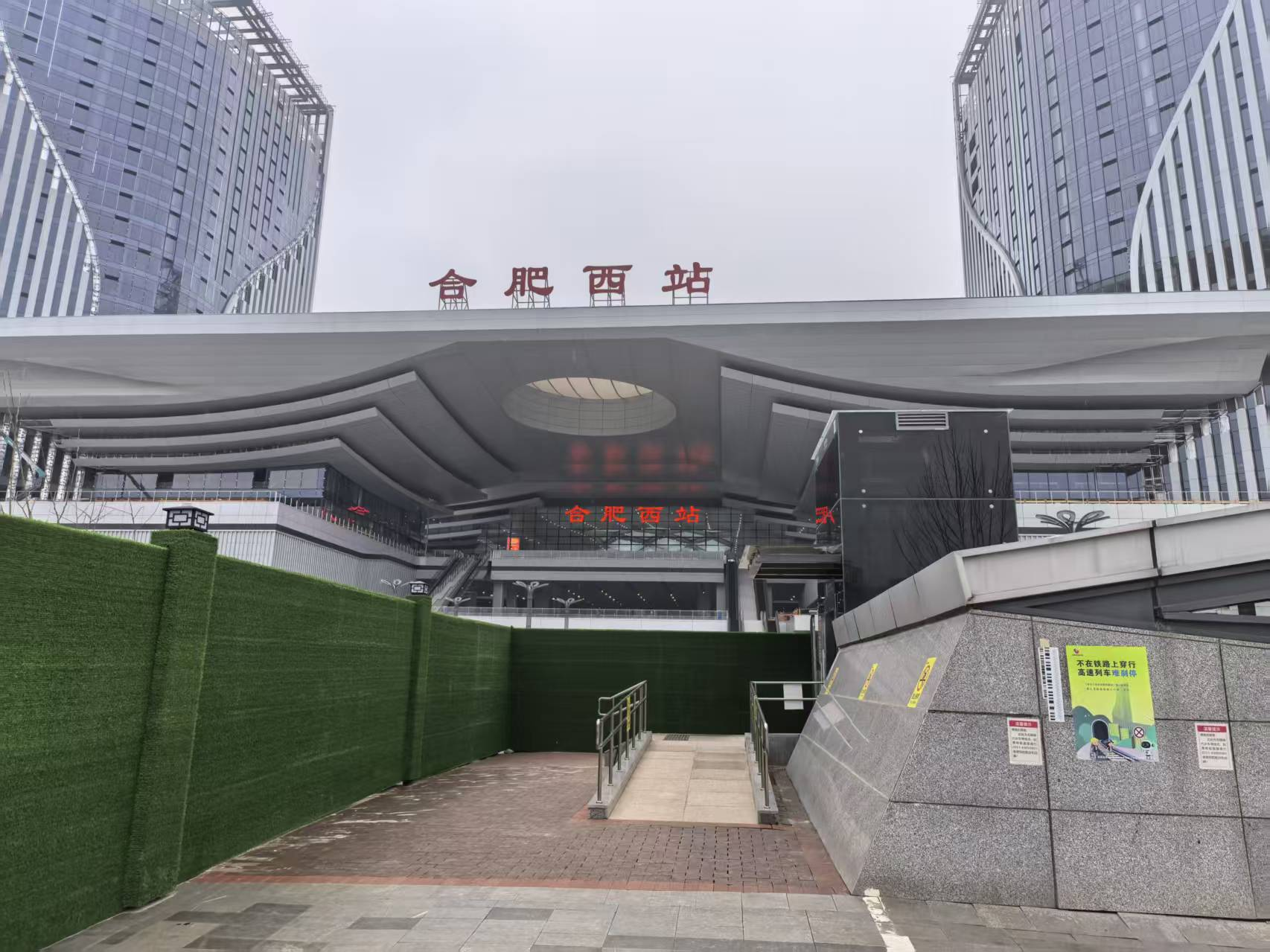

General information
- Location: Shushan District, Hefei, Anhui; China
- Coordinates: 31.872978°N 117.227709°E
- Line: Hefei–Anqing–Jiujiang high-speed railway
Location

Hefei West railway station (Chinese: 合肥西站; pinyin: Héféi xī zhàn) is a railway station under construction in Shushan District, Hefei, Anhui Province, China. The west side of the station building is expected to be completed in 2023, while the entire station is expected to be completed in 2025.

== Metro station ==
The station will be served by Line 3 and Line S1 of the Hefei Metro.
