= Hefei Metro =

Metro system in Hefei, China

Overview
- Locale: Hefei, Anhui, China
- Transit type: Rapid transit
- Number of lines: 9 (since November 2026)
- Line number: 1 2 3 4 5 6 7 8 S1
- Number of stations: 204
- Daily ridership: 741,800 (2021 average); 1.23 million (2020 record)
- Annual ridership: 271 million (2021)
- Website: http://www.hfgdjt.com/

Operation
- Began operation: December 26, 2016; 9 years ago
- Operators: Hefei Urban Mass Transit Co., Ltd.

Technical
- System length: 306.8 km (190.6 mi)
- Track gauge: 1,435 mm (4 ft 8 1/2 in) standard gauge

Hefei Rail Transit (Chinese: 合肥轨道交通), also known as Hefei Metro, is a rapid transit system in Hefei, China.

== Lines in operation ==
Line	Terminals (District / County)		Commencement	Newest Extension	Length km	Stations
Line 1 (Hefei Metro)	Zhangwa (Yaohai)	Jiulianwei (Baohe)	December 26, 2016	July 1, 2023	29.14	26
Line 2 (Hefei Metro)	Nangang (Shushan)	Cuozhen (Feidong)	December 26, 2017	December 26, 2023	42.76	35
Line 3 (Hefei Metro)	Xiangcheng Lu (Yaohai)	Sheng Ertong Yiyuan Xinqu (Feixi)	December 26, 2019	December 26, 2023	48.5	40
Line 4 (Hefei Metro)	Zongbaoqu (Shushan)	Shaomaigang (Feixi)	December 26, 2021	May 1, 2024	45.99	34
Line 5 (Hefei Metro)	Jiqiao Lu (Luyang)	Guiyang Lu (Baohe)	December 26, 2020	December 26, 2022	40.7	33
Line 6 (Hefei Metro)	Longtang (Feidong)	Qinglonggang (Shushan)	December 26, 2025	—	34.43	21
Line 7 (Hefei Metro)	Feicui Gongyuan (Shushan)	Sheng Wenhuahefeiyiguan (Baohe)	July 1, 2026	—	16.35	14
Line 8 (Hefei Metro)	Yilijing (Luyang)	Beicheng Gaotiezhan (Changfeng)	December 26, 2024	—	22.5	12
S1	Xinqiao 2 Hao Hangzhanlou (Xinqiao Terminal 2) (Shushan)	Shengzhongyiyuan Xiqu (Shushan)	November 19, 2026	—	31.3	10
Total					306.8	204

=== Line 1 ===
Construction on Line 1 began on June 1, 2012, with service beginning on December 26, 2016. The color of Line 1 is red.

=== Line 2 ===
Line 2 opened on December 26, 2017. Thales Saic Transport is providing the line with urban rail traffic management and CBTC systems. The color of Line 2 is dark blue.

=== Line 3 ===
Line 3 opened on December 26, 2019. Its color is green.

=== Line 4 ===
Line 4 opened on December 26, 2021. The color of Line 4 is orange.

=== Line 5 ===
Line 5 opened on December 26, 2020. Its color is chartreuse.

=== Line 6 ===
Line 6 opened on December 26, 2025, and runs from Qinglonggang to Longtang. The color of Line 6 is purple.

=== Line 7 ===
Line 7 opened on July 1, 2026. Its color is yellow.

=== Line 8 ===
Line 8 opened on December 26, 2024. Its color is sky blue.

=== Line S1 ===
Line S1 is a suburban express line connecting Hefei Xinqiao International Airport and the Hefei city center. It opened on November 19, 2026. Its color is tea brown.

== Future development ==
=== Phase III Plan ===
The extensions of Lines 2, 3, 4, and the first phases of Lines 6, 7, 8 as well as the regional line S1 are approved by the National Development and Reform Commission. As of July 2026, all lines of the Phase III expansion are already in service or under construction.

To-scale map of Hefei Metro Phase III

Line	Terminals		Planned opening	Length km	Stations	Status
S1 (Shouxian section)	Xinqiao 1 Hao Hangzhanlou (Xinqiao Terminal 1)	Shouxian Yanliu		11.8	3	Under construction
S1	Wulidun	Sheng Zhongyiyuan Xiqu		4.4	1	Under construction
7	Hefei Sizhong	Sheng Wenhuahefeiyiguan		2.5	2	Under construction
Total				18.7	6	

After the completion of Phase III, Hefei Metro will have a network length of 342.1 km (212.6 mi) and 234 stations.

=== Phase IV Plan ===
Currently, a number of projects are proposed for a Phase IV expansion, such as Line 2 West Extension, Line 7 Phase II, Line 8 Phase II, Line 9 Phase I, and Line 12, totalling 115.6 km (71.8 mi) of new rail lines.
