= Luogang (disambiguation) =

Luogang may refer to the following locations in China:

- Luogang District (萝岗区), Guangzhou
- Hefei Luogang International Airport (合肥骆岗国际机场), main airport serving Hefei, Anhui
- Luogang Subdistrict, Guangzhou (萝岗街道), in Luogang District, Guangzhou, Guangdong
- Luogang Subdistrict, Hefei (骆岗街道), in Baohe District, Hefei, Anhui
- Luogang Town, Hefei (骆岗镇), in Baohe District, Hefei, Anhui
