= Xinghuacun Subdistrict, Hefei =

Xinghuacun Subdistrict 杏花村街道
- Subdistrict
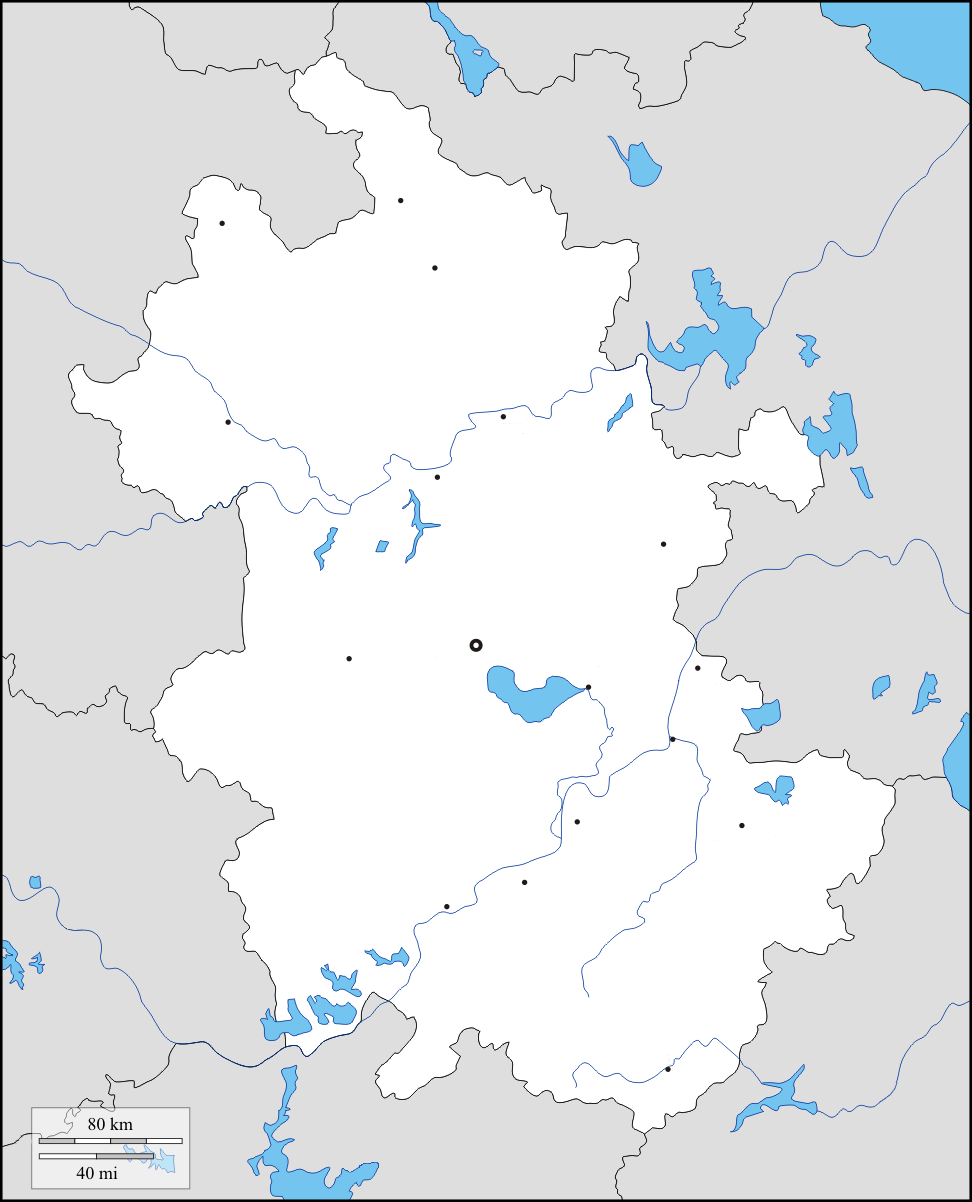
- Location in Anhui Xinghuacun Subdistrict (China)
- Coordinates: 31°53′34″N 117°15′56″E
- Country: People's Republic of China
- Province: Anhui
- Prefecture-level city: Hefei
- District: Luyang District
- Time zone: UTC+8 (China Standard)

Xinghuacun Subdistrict (Chinese: 杏花村街道; pinyin: Xìnghuācūn Jiēdào) is a subdistrict in Luyang District, Hefei, Anhui. As of 2020, it administers the following six residential communities:

- Wuli Community (五里社区)
- Lindian Community (林店社区)
- Jindu Community (金都社区)
- Lingbi Road Community (灵璧路社区)
- Jiqiaoxincun Community (汲桥新村社区)
- Songzhu Community (松竹社区)

== History ==
The sub district was formed on 28 July, 2004.

== See also ==
- List of township-level divisions of Anhui
