= Daxing, Anhui =

Daxing 大兴镇
- Town
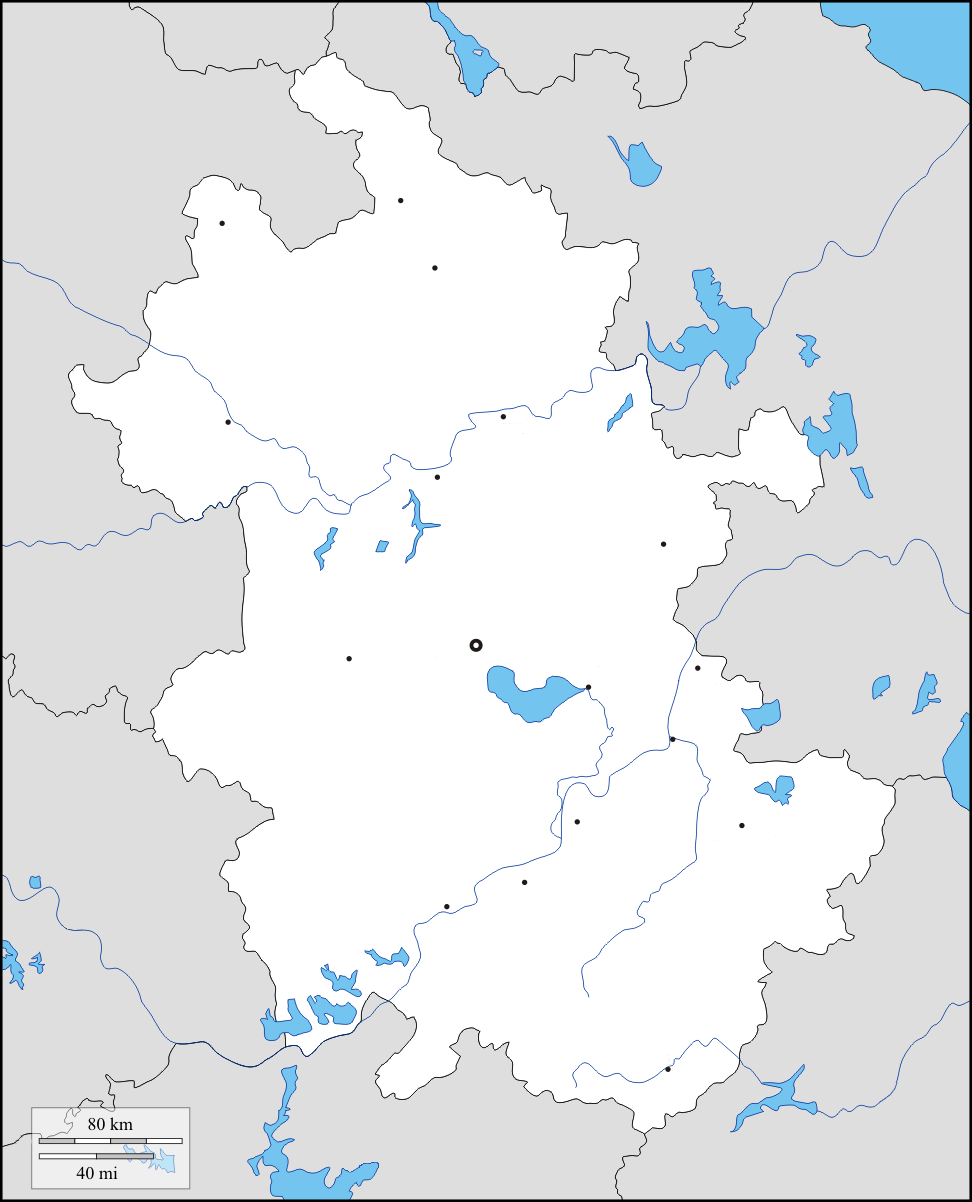
- Location in Anhui Daxing (China)
- Coordinates: 31°50′16″N 117°22′36″E
- Country: People's Republic of China
- Province: Anhui
- Prefecture-level city: Hefei
- District: Yaohai District

Daxing (simplified Chinese: 大兴镇; traditional Chinese: 大興鎮; pinyin: Dàxīng Zhèn) is a town in Yaohai District, Anhui, China. As of 2018, it has 10 residential communities under its administration.
