= Haitang Subdistrict, Hefei =

Haitang Subdistrict 海棠街道
- Subdistrict
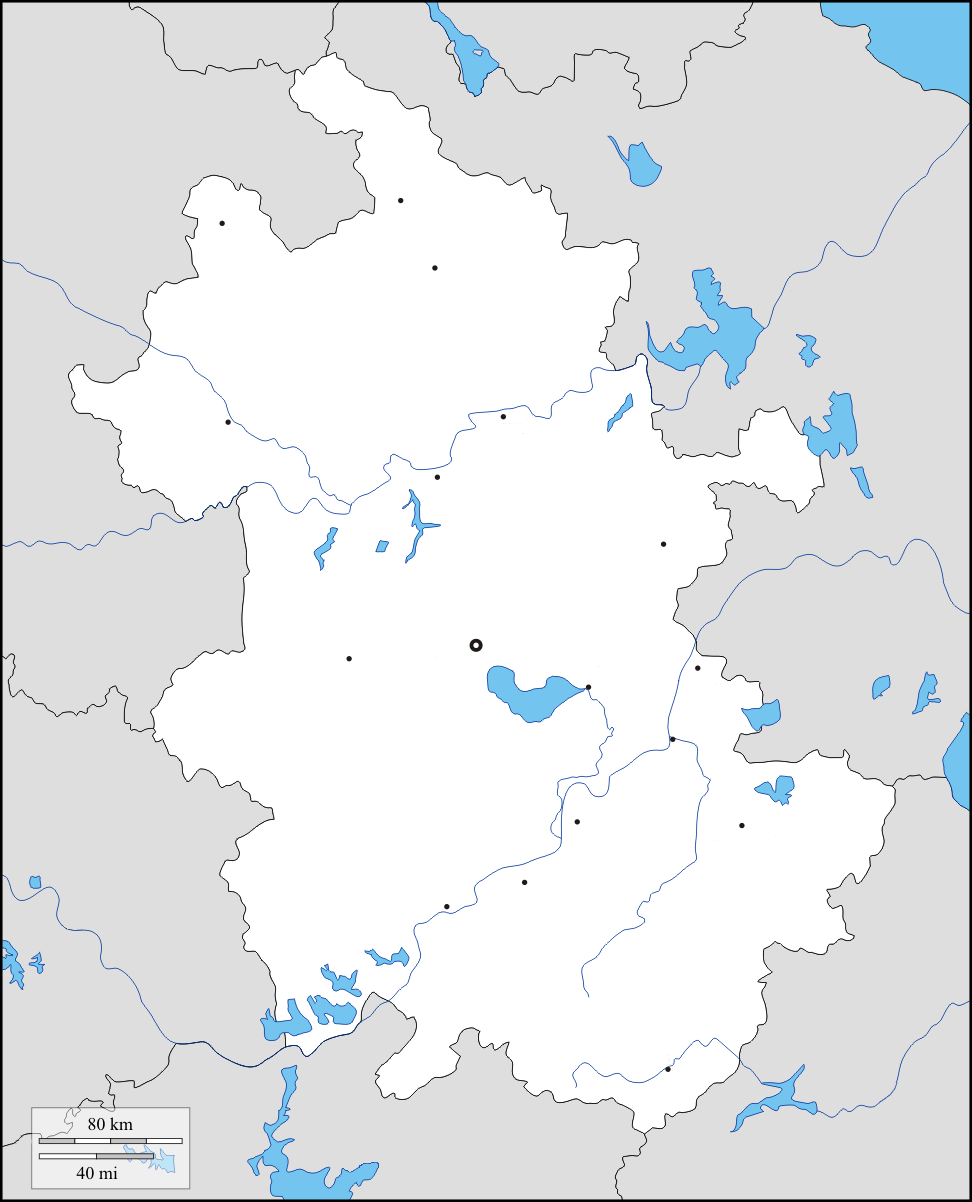
- Location in Anhui Haitang Subdistrict (China)
- Coordinates: 31°53′37″N 117°16′0″E
- Country: People's Republic of China
- Province: Anhui
- Prefecture-level city: Hefei
- District: Luyang District
- Time zone: UTC+8 (China Standard)

Haitang Subdistrict (Chinese: 海棠街道; pinyin: Hǎitáng Jiēdào) is a subdistrict in Luyang District of Anhui, China. As of 2020, it administers the following five residential communities:

- Outang Community (藕塘社区)
- Qinghua Community (清华社区)
- Hetang Community (荷塘社区)
- Pinglou Community (平楼社区)
- Jianhua Community (建华社区)

== See also ==
- List of township-level divisions of Anhui
