= Changqing Subdistrict, Hefei =

Changqing Subdistrict 常青街道
- Subdistrict

Chinese transcription(s)
  - Pinyin: Chángqīng Jiēdào
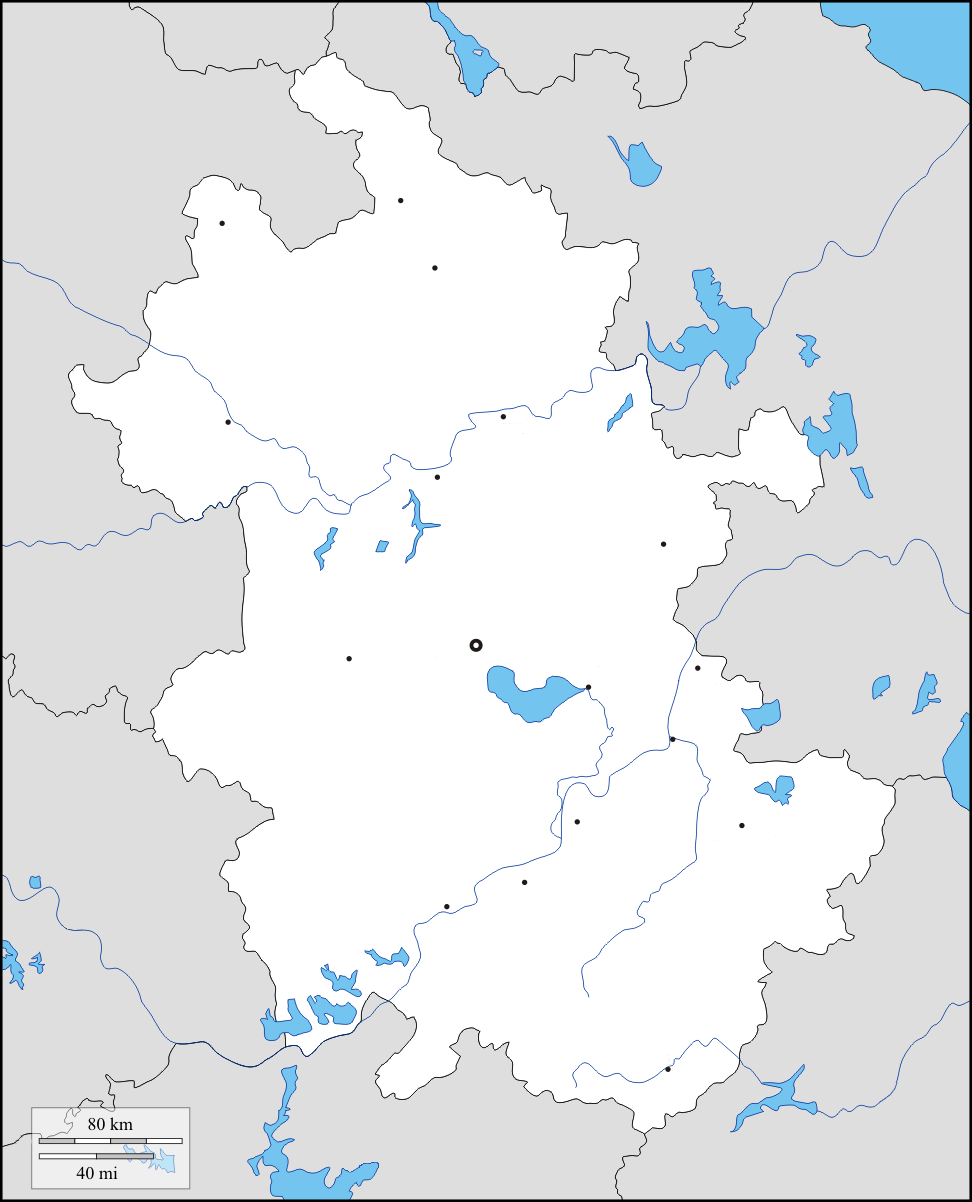
- Location in Anhui Changqing Subdistrict (China)
- Coordinates: 31.83848°N 117.28596°E
- Country: China
- Province: Anhui
- Prefecture: Hefei
- District: Baohe District
- Time zone: UTC+8 (China Standard Time)

Changqing Subdistrict (Chinese: 常青街道; pinyin: Chángqīng Jiēdào) is a township-level division situated in Hefei, Anhui, China.

== See also ==
- List of township-level divisions of Anhui
