= Line 8 (Hefei Metro) =

Metro line in Hefei, China

- 8

Overview
- Native name: 合肥轨道交通8号线
- Status: Operational
- Owner: Hefei
- Locale: Hefei, Anhui, China
- Termini: Yilijing; Beicheng Gaotiezhan (Beicheng High-Speed Railway Station)
- Stations: 12

Service
- Type: Rapid transit
- System: Hefei Metro
- Operator(s): Hefei Rail Transit Group Co., Ltd

History
- Opened: 26 December 2024; 12 months ago

Technical
- Line length: 22.5 km (14.0 mi)
- Track gauge: 1,435 mm (4 ft 8 1/2 in)

Hefei Metro Line 8 (Chinese: 合肥轨道交通8号线; pinyin: Héféi Guǐdào Jiāotōng Bāhào Xiàn) is a metro line in Hefei, Anhui, China. Phase 1 is opened on 26 December 2024. Phase 2 is still under planning. Line 8 of Hefei Metro is the first fully automated metro line using driverless trains in Anhui province.

== History ==
The line's construction started on 30 November 2020. Soon after construction work finished, the trial operation began on 1 September 2024, and a 3-day-long trial ride for free was available to the public from 20 to 22 December 2024. The formal operation starts on 26 December 2024.

== Stations ==
Station name		Connections	Distance km	Location
English	Chinese	Connections	Distance km	Location
Yilijing	一里井	3		Luyang
Xinglin	杏林			Luyang
Luyang Jingkaiqu	庐阳经开区			Luyang
Liuzhong Linghu Xiaoqu	六中菱湖校区	5		Luyang
Hetang Lu	荷塘路			Luyang
Shuangfeng	双凤			Changfeng
Jinmei Lu	金梅路			Changfeng
Meichonghu	梅冲湖			Changfeng
Beicheng Shijicheng	北城世纪城			Changfeng
Shuangdun	双墩			Changfeng
Shengli Yiyuan Beiqu	省立医院北区			Changfeng
Beicheng Gaotiezhan (Beicheng High-Speed Railway Station)	北城高铁站	COH		Changfeng
