= Yicheng Subdistrict, Hefei =

Yicheng Subdistrict 义城街道
- Subdistrict
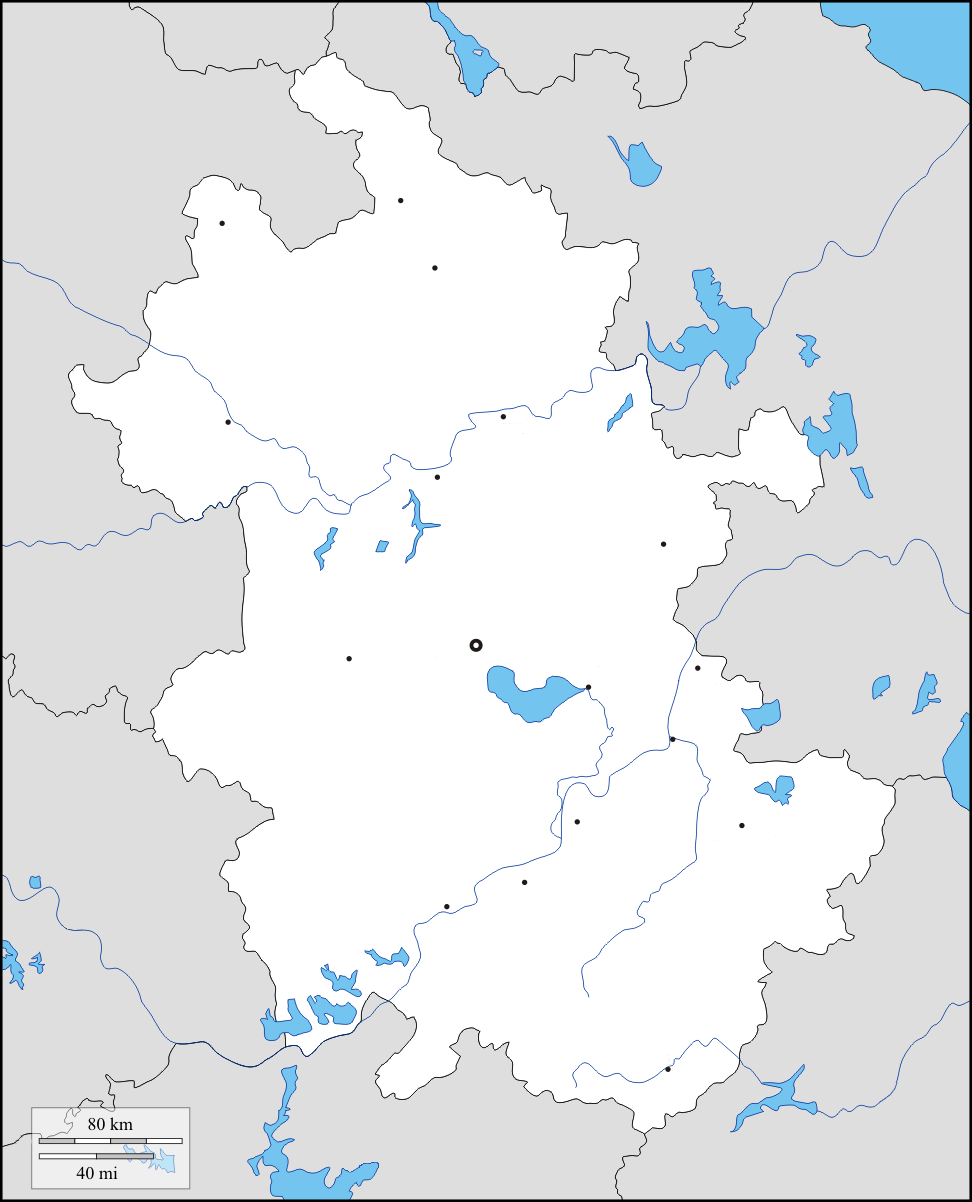
- Location in Anhui Yicheng Subdistrict (China)
- Coordinates: 31°43′59″N 117°20′10″E
- Country: People's Republic of China
- Province: Anhui
- Prefecture-level city: Hefei
- District: Baohe District
- Time zone: UTC+8 (China Standard)

Yicheng Subdistrict (simplified Chinese: 义城街道; traditional Chinese: 義城街道; pinyin: Yìchéng Jiēdào) is a subdistrict of China in Baohe District, Hefei, Anhui. As of 2020, it administers Yicheng Community, Yinghuai Community (迎淮社区), Qianyang Village (前杨村), Beixu Village (北徐村), and Wangliao Village (汪潦村).

== See also ==
- List of township-level divisions of Anhui
