= Luogang Subdistrict, Hefei =

Luogang Subdistrict 骆岗街道
- Subdistrict
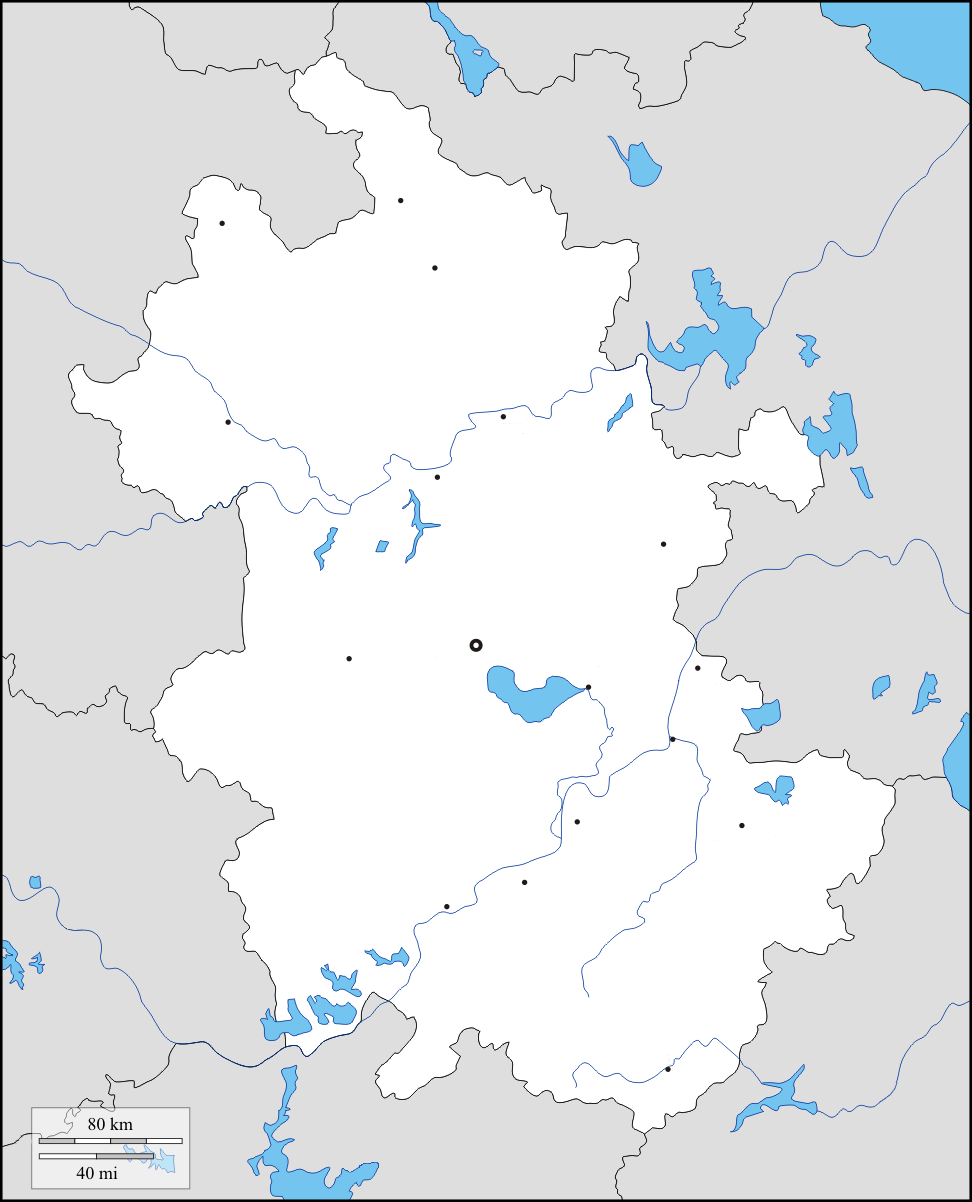
- Location in Anhui Luogang Subdistrict (China)
- Coordinates: 31°49′21″N 117°17′50″E
- Country: People's Republic of China
- Province: Anhui
- Prefecture-level city: Hefei
- District: Baohe District
- Time zone: UTC+8 (China Standard)

Luogang Subdistrict (simplified Chinese: 骆岗街道; traditional Chinese: 駱崗街道; pinyin: Luògāng Jiēdào) is a subdistrict of China in Baohe District, Hefei, Anhui. As of 2020, it administers the following ten residential neighborhoods and two villages:

- Luogang
- Guantang (官塘)
- Shihe (施河)
- Gaowang (高王)
- Luji (陆集)
- Baoheyuan (包河苑)
- Baohehuayuan (包河花园)
- Chegu (车谷)
- Shiqiao Community (石桥社区)
- Fanhua Community (繁华社区)
- Luda Village (陆大村)
- Beidou Village (北斗村)

== See also ==
- List of township-level divisions of Anhui
