= Luyang, Hefei =

Coordinates: 31°51′48″N 117°14′49″E

Luyang 庐阳区
- District
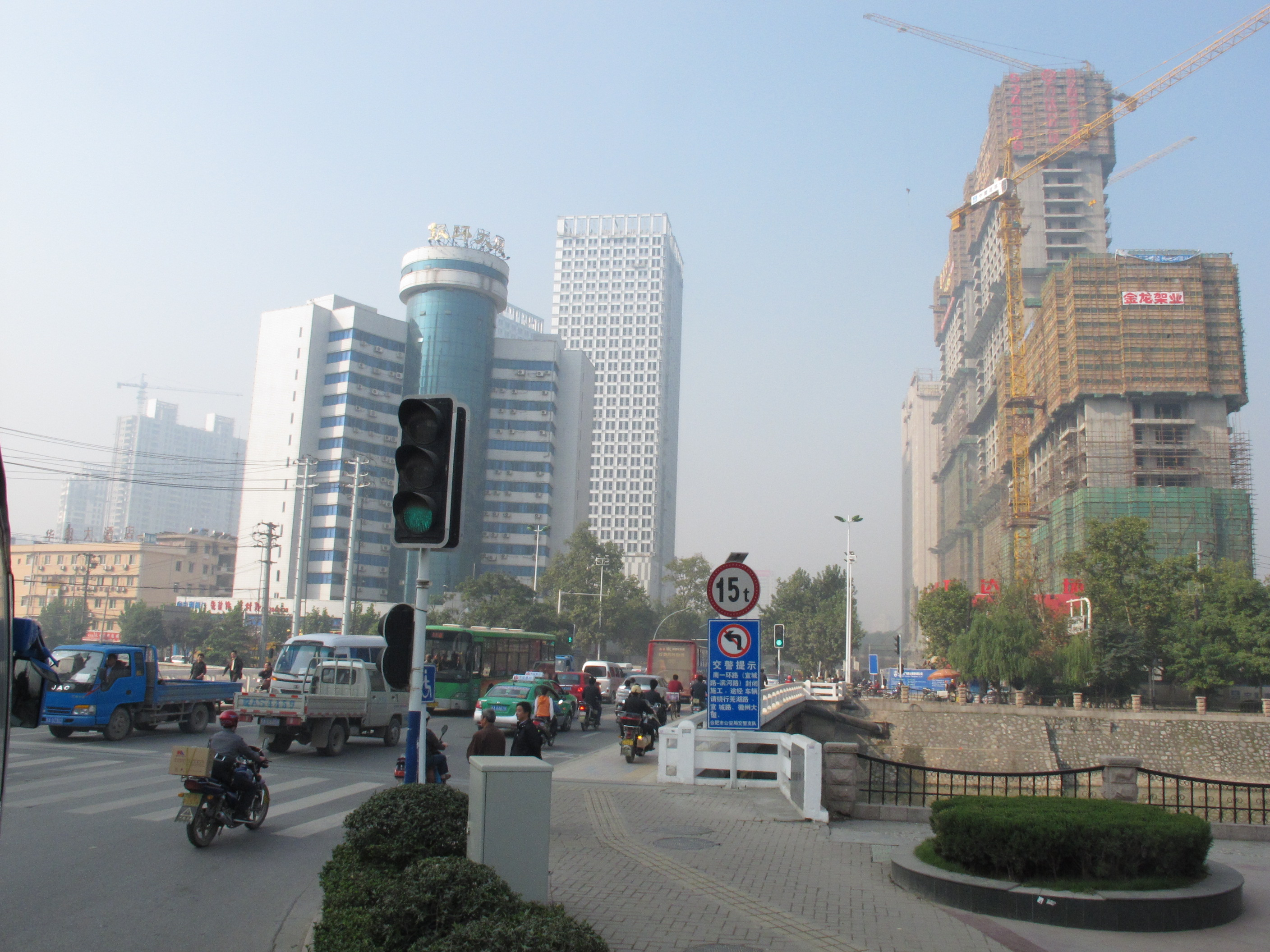

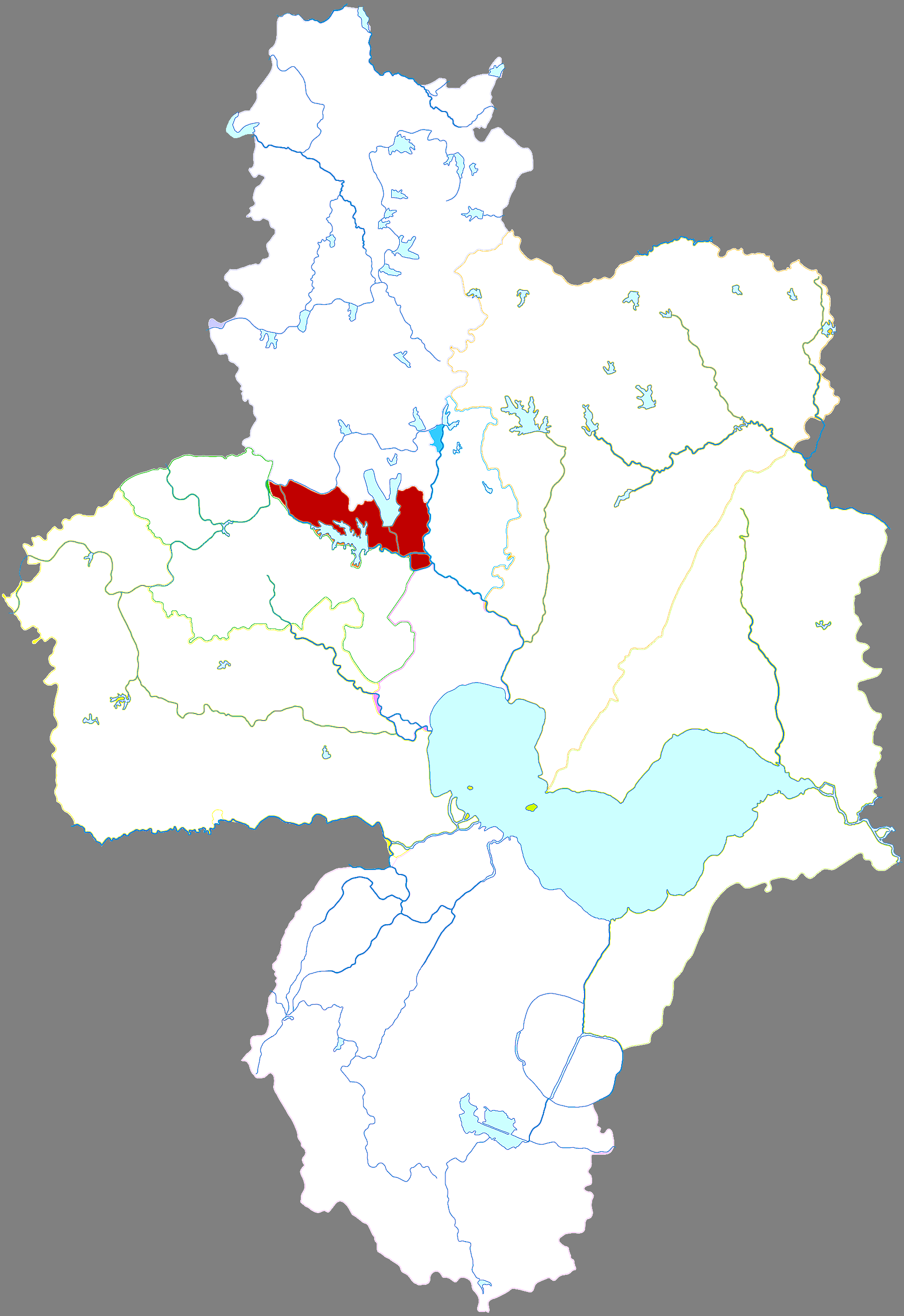
- Luyang in Hefei

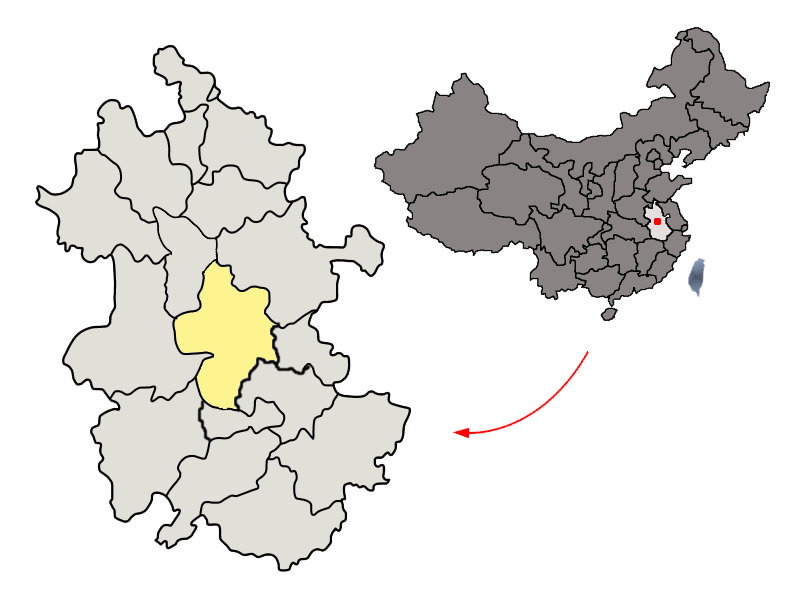
- Hefei in Anhui
- Country: China
- Province: Anhui
- Prefecture-level city: Hefei
- District seat: Bozhoulu

Area
  - Total: 139.32 km^{2} (53.79 sq mi)

Population (2020)
  - Total: 697,293
  - Density: 5,005.0/km^{2} (12,963/sq mi)
- Time zone: UTC+8 (China Standard)
- Postal code: 230001
- Website: Official Site

Luyang District (simplified Chinese: 庐阳区; traditional Chinese: 廬陽區; pinyin: Lúyáng Qū) is one of four urban districts of the prefecture-level city of Hefei, the capital of Anhui Province, East China. It makes up the main part of the old city area of Hefei. It has a total area of 139.32 square kilometres (53.79 sq mi), and a population of 609,239 inhabitants.

== Administrative divisions ==
Luyang District is divided to 9 subdistricts, 1 town and 1 township.

Subdistricts

- Bozhoulu Subdistrict (亳州路街道)
- Shuanggang Subdistrict (双岗街道)
- Xinglin Subdistrict (杏林街道)
- Haitang Subdistrict (海棠街道)
- Xinghuacun Subdistrict (杏花村街道)
- Xiaoyaojin Subdistrict (逍遥津街道)
- Sanxiaokou Subdistrict (三孝口街道)
- Silihe Subdistrict (四里河街道)
- Lindian Subdistrict (林店街道)

Towns

- Dayang Town (大杨镇)

Townships

- Sanshigang Township (三十岗乡)
