= Yaohai, Hefei =

Coordinates: 31°50′31″N 117°18′24″E

Yaohai 瑶海区
- District
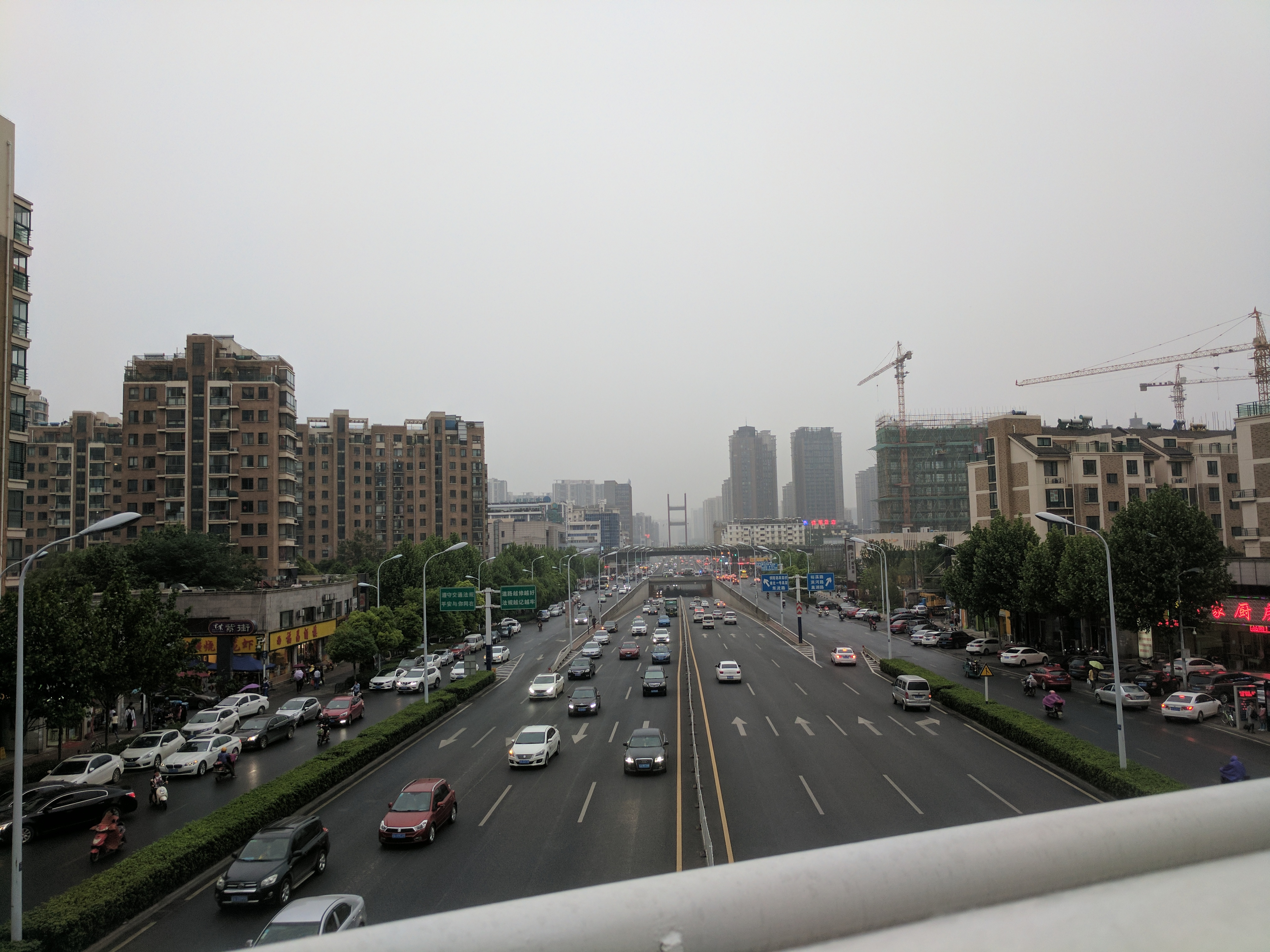

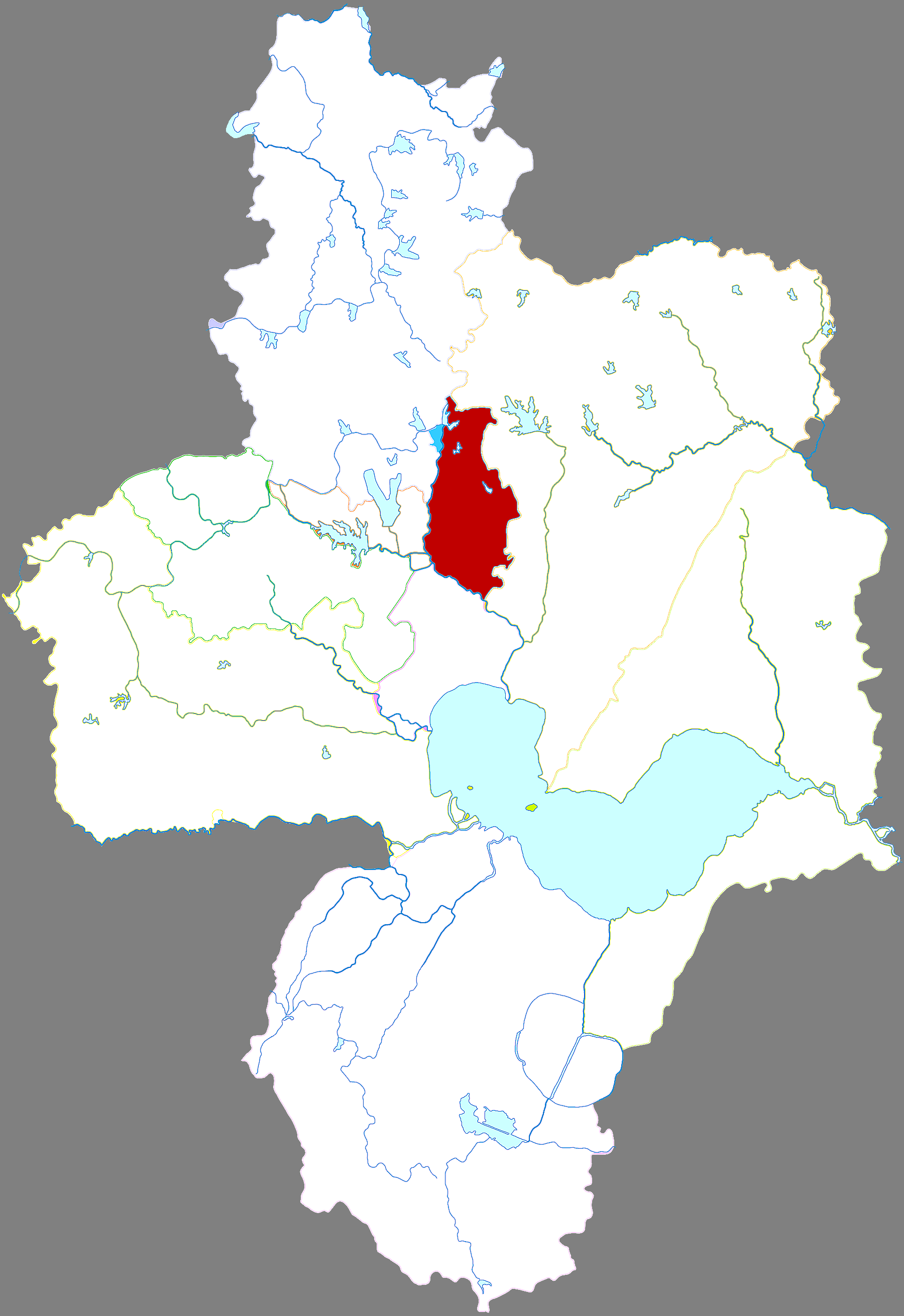
- Yaohai in Hefei

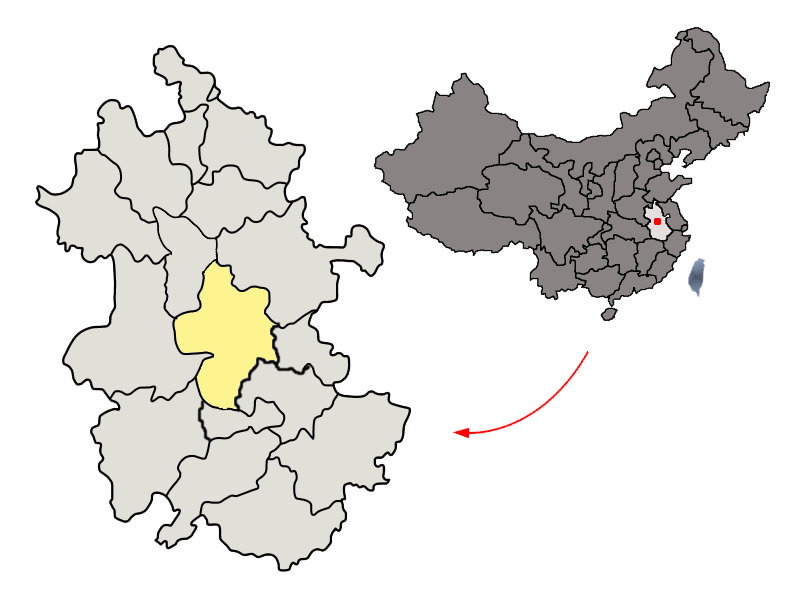
- Hefei in Anhui
- Country: China
- Province: Anhui
- Prefecture-level city: Hefei
- District seat: Hepinglu

Area
  - Total: 64.4 km^{2} (24.9 sq mi)

Population (2020)
  - Total: 862,043
  - Density: 13,400/km^{2} (34,700/sq mi)
- Time zone: UTC+8 (China Standard)
- Postal code: 230011
- Website: http://www.hfyaohai.gov.cn/

Yaohai District (simplified Chinese: 瑶海区; traditional Chinese: 瑤海區; pinyin: Yáohǎi Qū) is one of four urban districts of the prefecture-level city of Hefei, the capital of Anhui Province, East China. The district has a surface of 142.9 km^{2} (55.2 sq mi) and a population of 902,830 inhabitants. It contains 1 township, 1 town, 10 subdistricts, 1 industrial park, and 1 development zone.

== Administrative divisions ==
Yaohai District is divided to 14 subdistricts and 1 town.

Subdistricts

- Mingguanglu Subdistrict (明光路街道)
- Shenglilu Subdistrict (胜利路街道)
- Sanlijie Subdistrict (三里街街道)
- Tonglinglu Subdistrict (铜陵路街道)
- Qilizhan Subdistrict (七里站街道)
- Hongguang Subdistrict (红光街道)
- Hepinglu Subdistrict (和平路街道)
- Chengdong Subdistrict (城东街道)
- Changhuai Subdistrict (长淮街道)
- Fangmiao Subdistrict (方庙街道)
- Qilitang Subdistrict (七里塘街道)
- Jiashanlu Subdistrict (嘉山路街道)
- Modian Subdistrict (磨店街道)

Town

- Daxing (大兴镇)

Other

- Longgang Development Zone (龙岗开发区)
