= Baohe, Hefei =

Baohe 包河区
- District
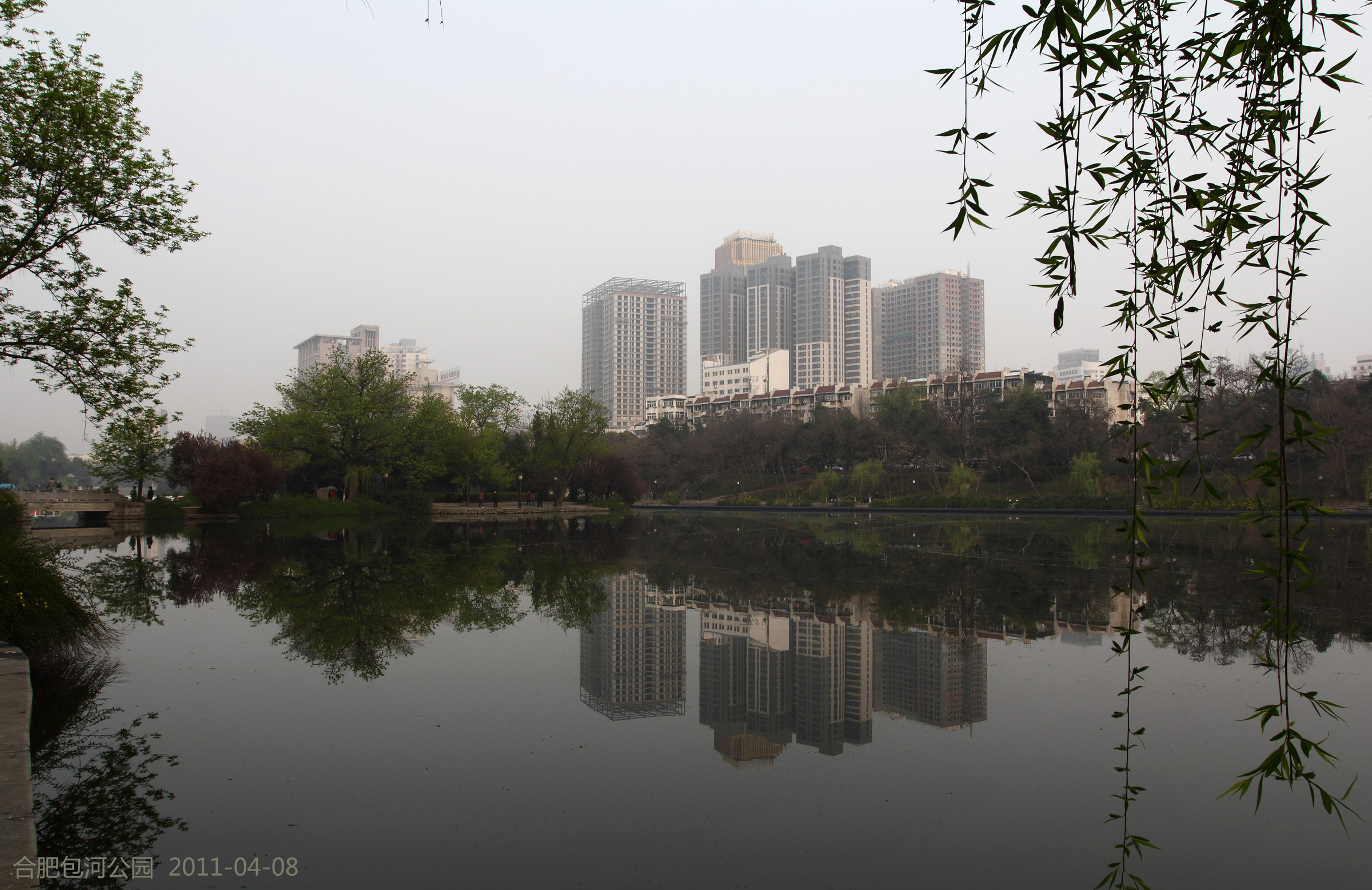

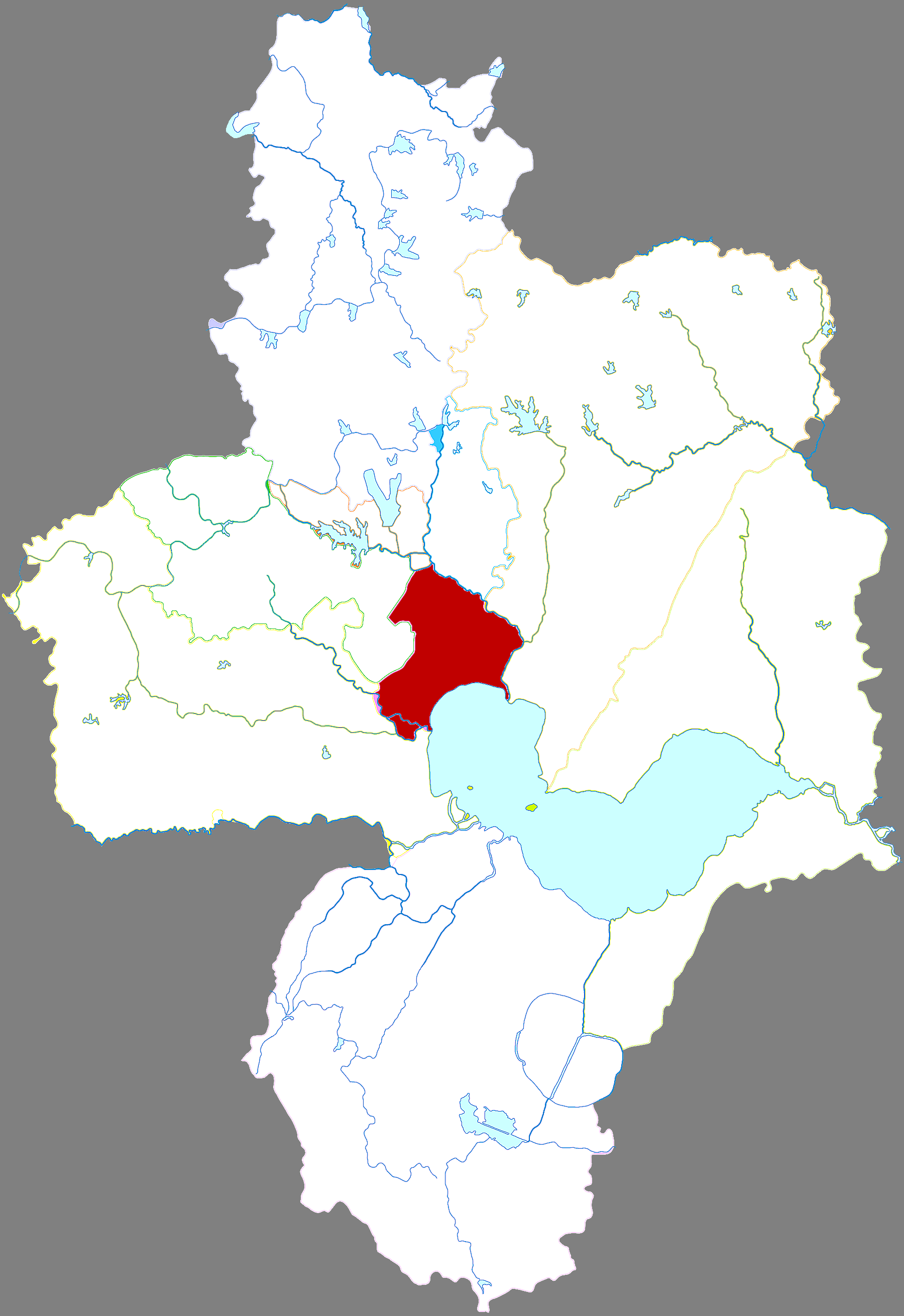
- Baohe in Hefei

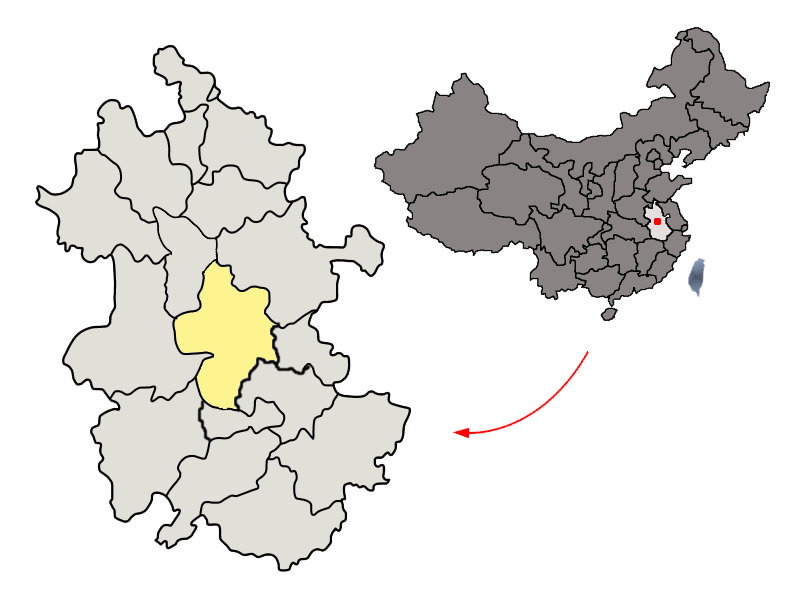
- Hefei in Anhui
- Coordinates: 31°47′35″N 117°18′35″E
- Country: China
- Province: Anhui
- Prefecture-level city: Hefei
- District seat: Luogang

Area
  - Total: 294.94 km^{2} (113.88 sq mi)

Population (2020)
  - Total: 1,217,469
  - Density: 4,127.9/km^{2} (10,691/sq mi)
- Time zone: UTC+8 (China Standard)
- Postal code: 230041
- Website: archived link

Baohe District (simplified Chinese: 包河区; traditional Chinese: 包河區; pinyin: Bāohé Qū) is one of four urban districts of the prefecture-level city of Hefei, the capital of Anhui Province, East China, located on the northwest shore of Lake Chao. The district has an area of 294.94 km^{2} (113.88 sq mi) and a population of 817,686 inhabitants. It governs 7 subdistricts and 2 towns.

== Administrative divisions ==
Baohe District is divided to 9 subdistricts, 2 towns and 2 residential communities.

Subdistricts

- Luogang Subdistrict (骆岗街道)
- Changqing Subdistrict (常青街道)
- Wuhulu Subdistrict (芜湖路街道)
- Baogong Subdistrict (包公街道)
- Wanghu Subdistrict (望湖街道)
- Yicheng Subdistrict (义城街道)
- Yandun Subdistrict (烟墩街道)
- Wannianbu Subdistrict (万年埠街道)
- Tong'an Subdistrict (同安街道)

Towns

- Feihe (淝河镇)
- Dawei (大圩镇)

Residential communities

- Binhushiji Residential Community (滨湖世纪社区)
- Fangxing Residential Community (方兴社区)
