= Shushan, Hefei =

Shushan 蜀山区
- District
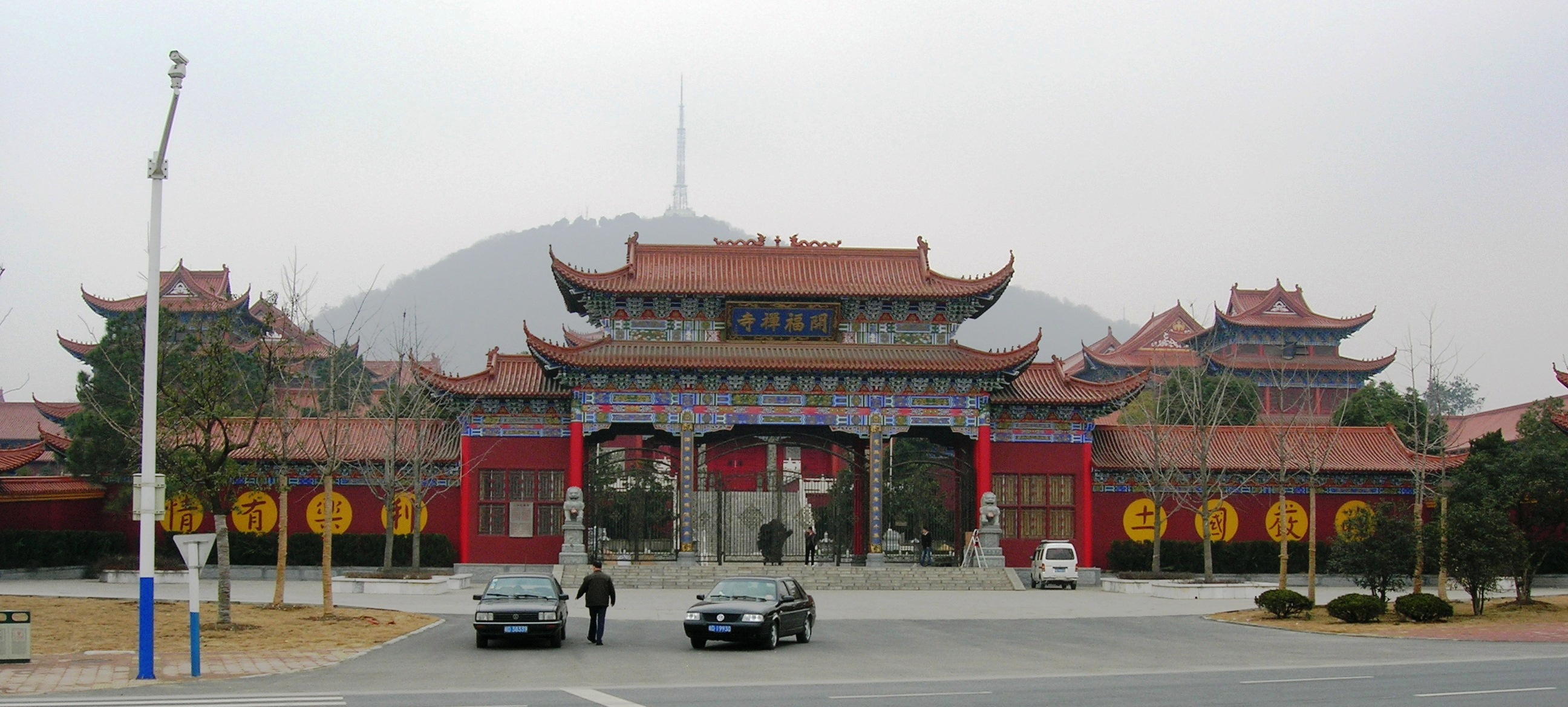
- Shushan scenic area

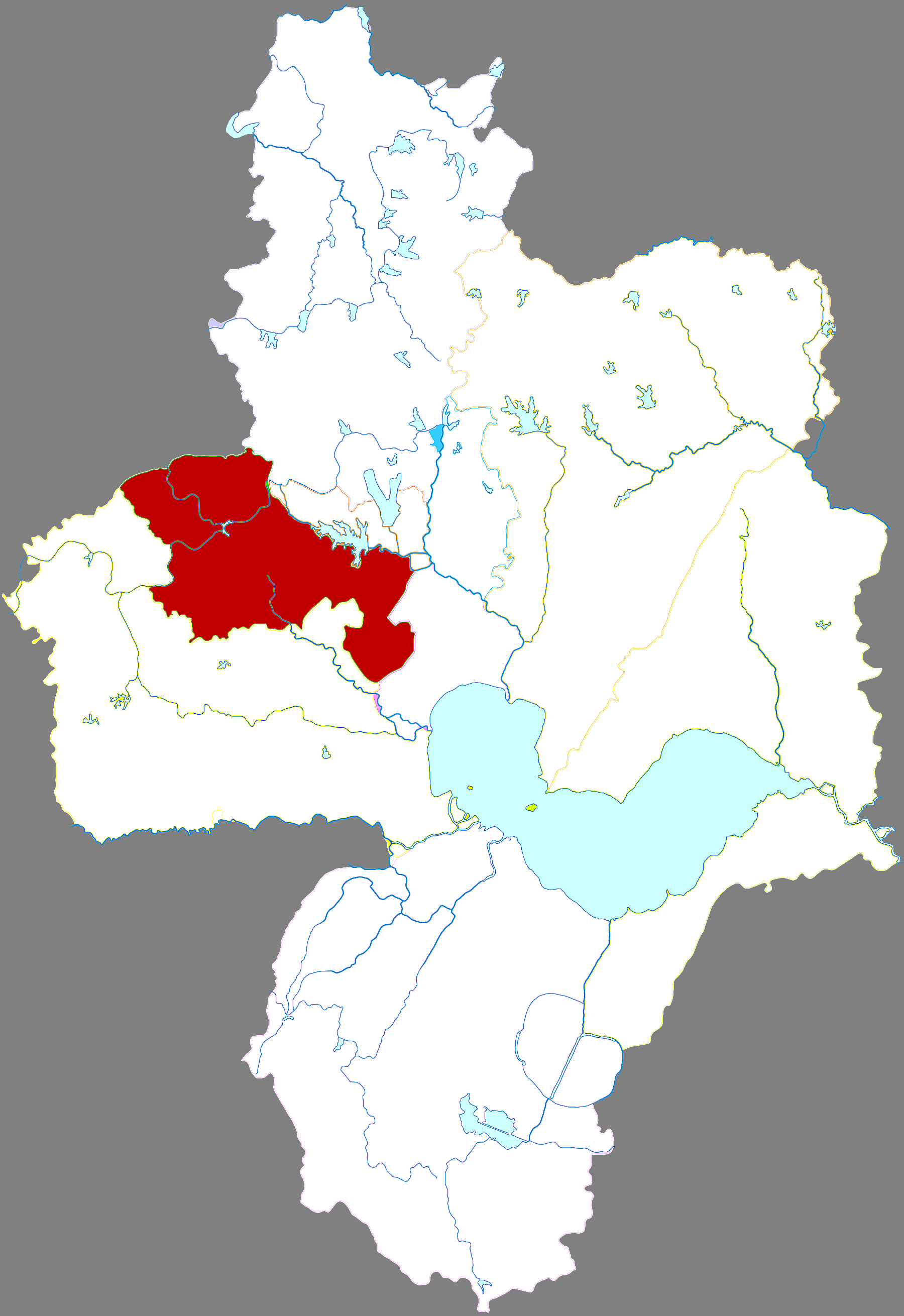
- Shushan in Hefei

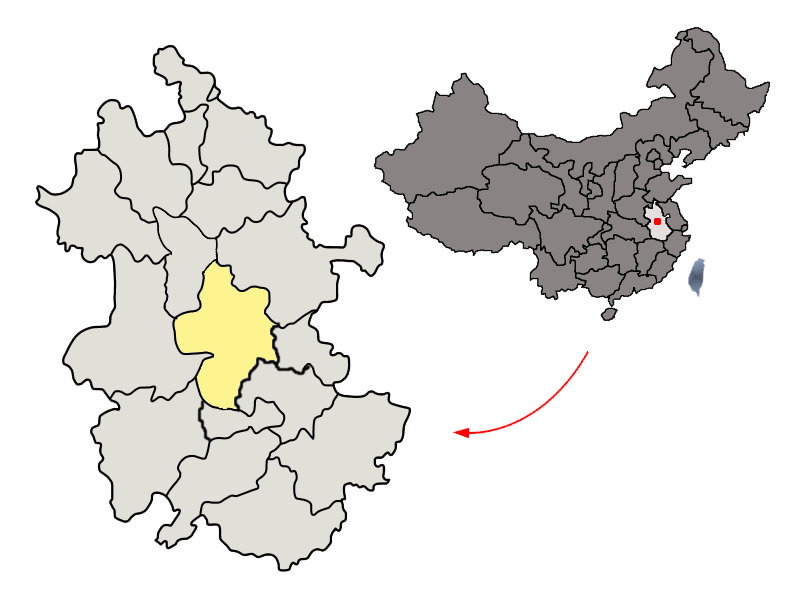
- Hefei in Anhui
- Coordinates: 31°51′04″N 117°15′38″E
- Country: China
- Province: Anhui
- Prefecture-level city: Hefei
- District seat: Sanli'an

Area
  - Total: 663 km^{2} (256 sq mi)

Population (2020)
  - Total: 1,047,150
  - Density: 1,580/km^{2} (4,090/sq mi)
- Time zone: UTC+8 (China Standard)
- Postal code: 230031

Shushan District (simplified Chinese: 蜀山区; traditional Chinese: 蜀山區; pinyin: Shǔshān Qū) is one of four urban districts and the municipal seat of the prefecture-level city of Hefei, the capital of Anhui Province, East China. The district has an area of 261.36 km^{2} (100.91 sq mi) and a population of 1,022,321 inhabitants as of the 2010 Census. It contains 8 subdistricts and two towns.

== Administrative divisions ==
Shushan District is divided to 8 subdistricts and 3 towns.

Subdistricts

- Sanli'an Subdistrict (三里庵街道)
- Daoxiangcun Subdistrict (稻香村街道)
- Hupo Subdistrict (琥珀街道)
- Nanqi Subdistrict (南七街道)
- Xiyuan Subdistrict (西园街道)
- Wulidun Subdistrict (五里墩街道)
- Heyedi Subdistrict (荷叶地街道)
- Maojiashan Subdistrict (笔架山街道)

Towns

- Jinggang (井岗镇)
- Nangang (南岗镇)
- Xiaomiao (小庙镇)

Other

- Shushan New Industrial Park (蜀山新产业园区)
