= Lingxia, Zhejiang =

Lingxia 岭下镇
- Town
- Interactive map of Lingxia
- Coordinates: 29°03′22″N 119°45′33″E
- Country: People's Republic of China
- Province: Zhejiang
- Prefecture-level city: Jinhua
- District: Jindong
- Village-level divisions: 34 villages
- Elevation: 70 m (230 ft)
- Time zone: UTC+8 (China Standard)
- Area code: 0579

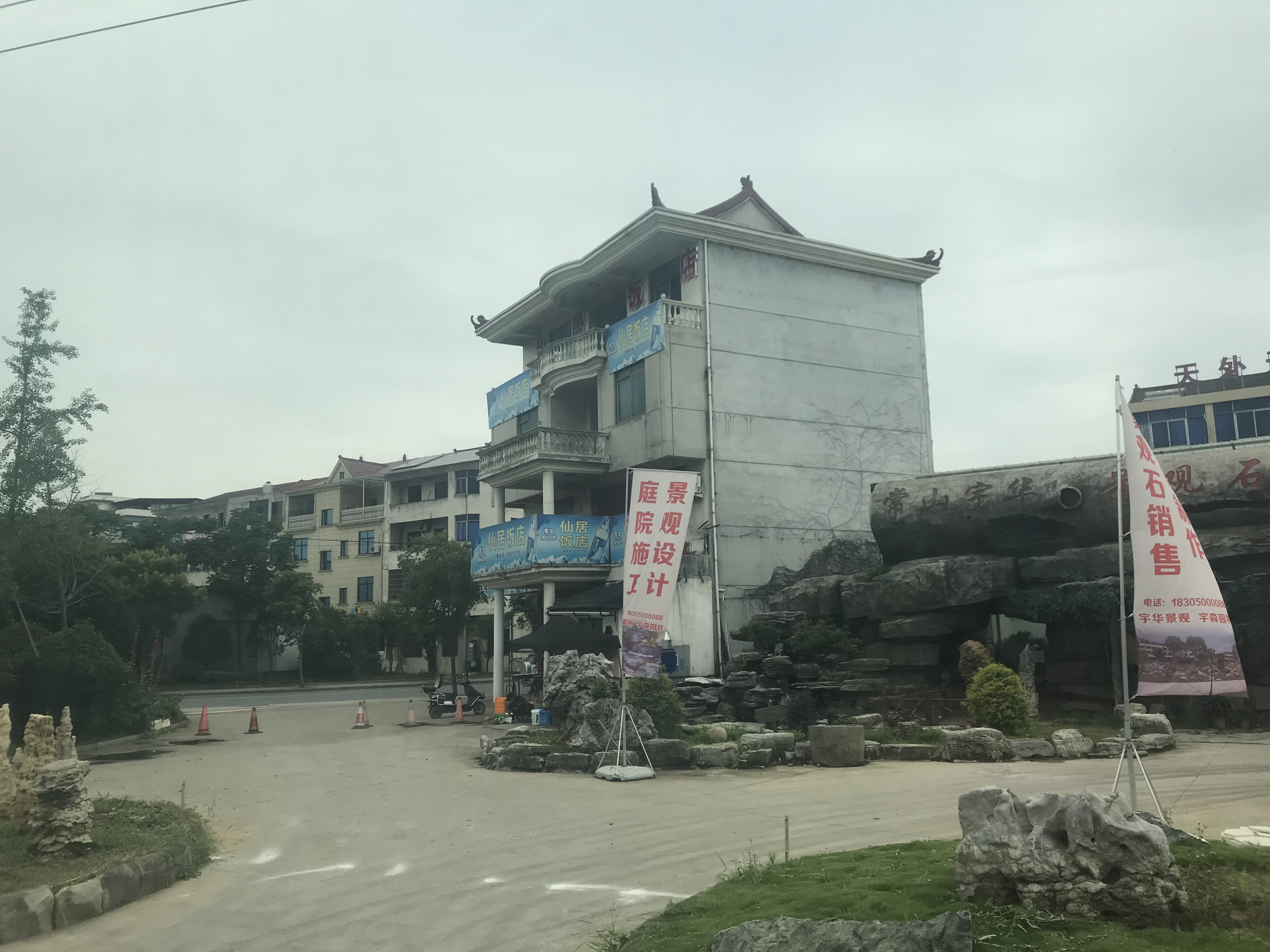
Buildings in Lingxia

Lingxia (simplified Chinese: 岭下; traditional Chinese: 嶺下; pinyin: Lǐngxià) is a town of Jindong District, in the southeastern suburbs of Jinhua, Zhejiang, People's Republic of China, located near the interchange of G25 Changchun–Shenzhen Expressway with China National Highway 330 about 11 kilometres (6.8 mi) from downtown. As of 2011, it has 34 villages under its administration.

== See also ==
- List of township-level divisions of Zhejiang
