= Andi Reservoir =

- Xianyuan Lake
- 安地水库 (Chinese)
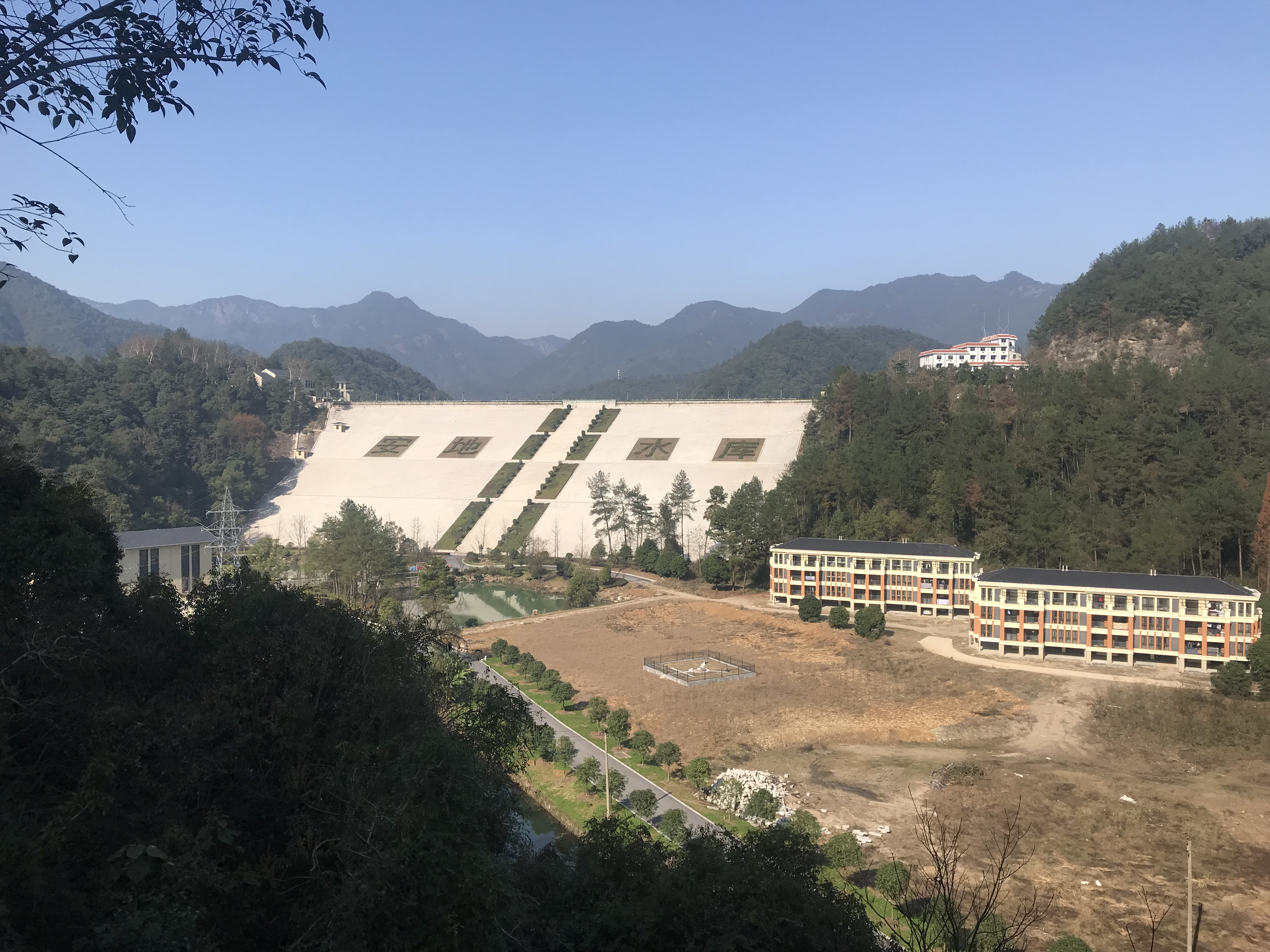
- The dam of Andi Reservoir.

- Location within Zhejiang
- Location: Andi Town, Jinhua, Zhejiang, China
- Coordinates: 28°57′12.51″N 119°37′13.88″E
- Type: Reservoir
- Primary outflows: Mei Stream
- Basin countries: China
- Built: 1965
- First flooded: 1965
- Surface area: 162 square kilometres (40,000 acres)
- Water volume: 62,500,000 cubic metres (16.5×10^{9} US gal)
- Surface elevation: 126.5 metres (415 ft)

Andi Reservoir (simplified Chinese: 安地水库; traditional Chinese: 安地水庫; pinyin: Āndì Shuǐkù), also known as Xianyuan Lake (Chinese: 仙源湖; pinyin: Xiānyuán Hú), is a large reservoir located in Andi Town of Jinhua, Zhejiang, China. The reservoir is the source of the Mei Stream, a tributary of Wuyi River. With an area of 162 square kilometres (40,000 acres), the reservoir has a capacity of 62,500,000 cubic metres (16.5×10^{9} US gal).

== History ==
Construction of Andi Reservoir, designed by the local government, commenced in 1959 and was completed in 1965.

== Function ==
Andi Reservoir belongs to the first grade water source protection area (一级水源保护区) and is part of Jinhua's water supply network.

The reservoir provides drinking water and water for irrigation and recreational activities.

== Public Access ==
Andi Reservoir open to visitors for free. Fishing and hiking are activities around the reservoir.

== Gallery ==
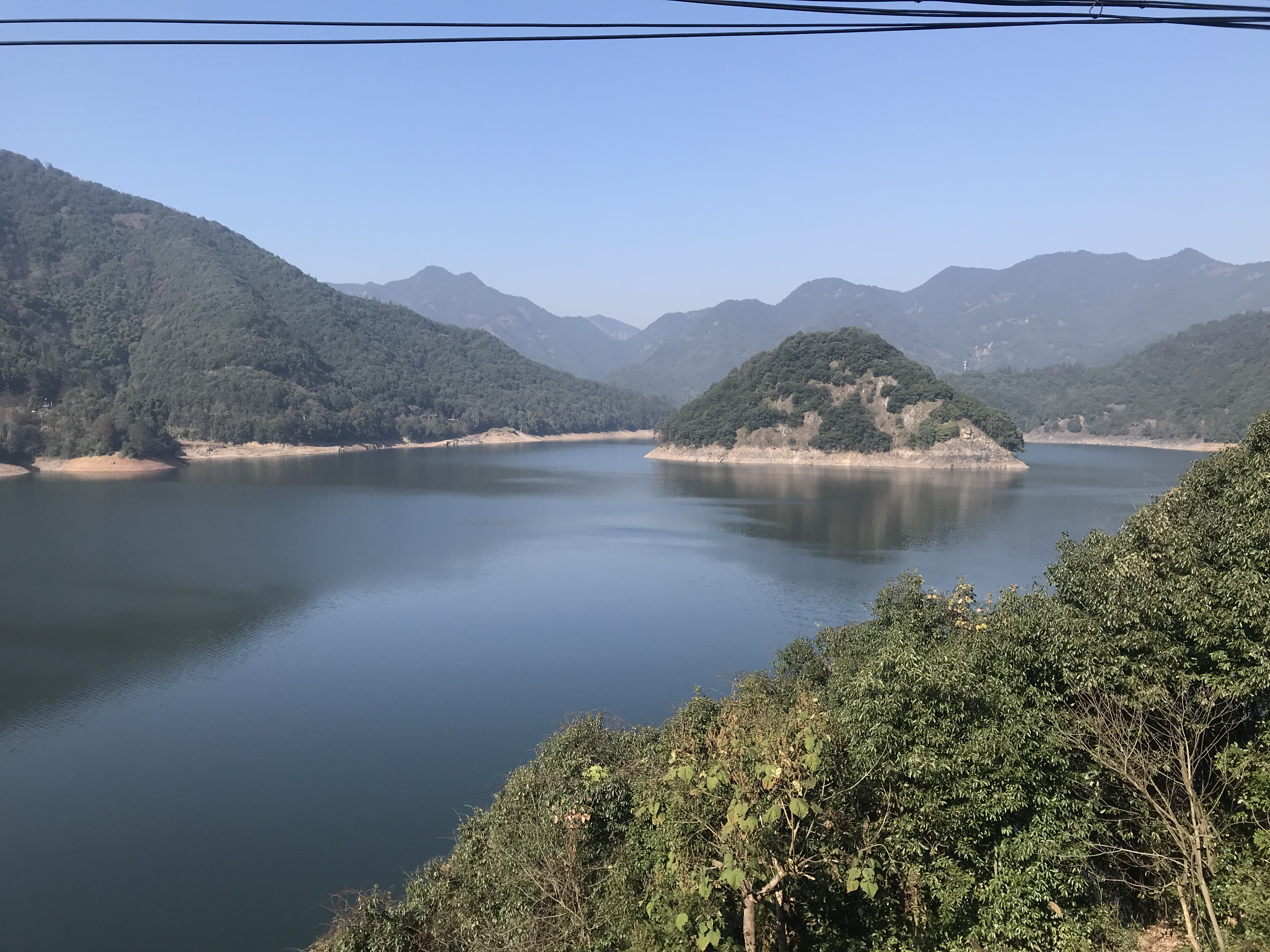
A corner of Andi Reservoir.

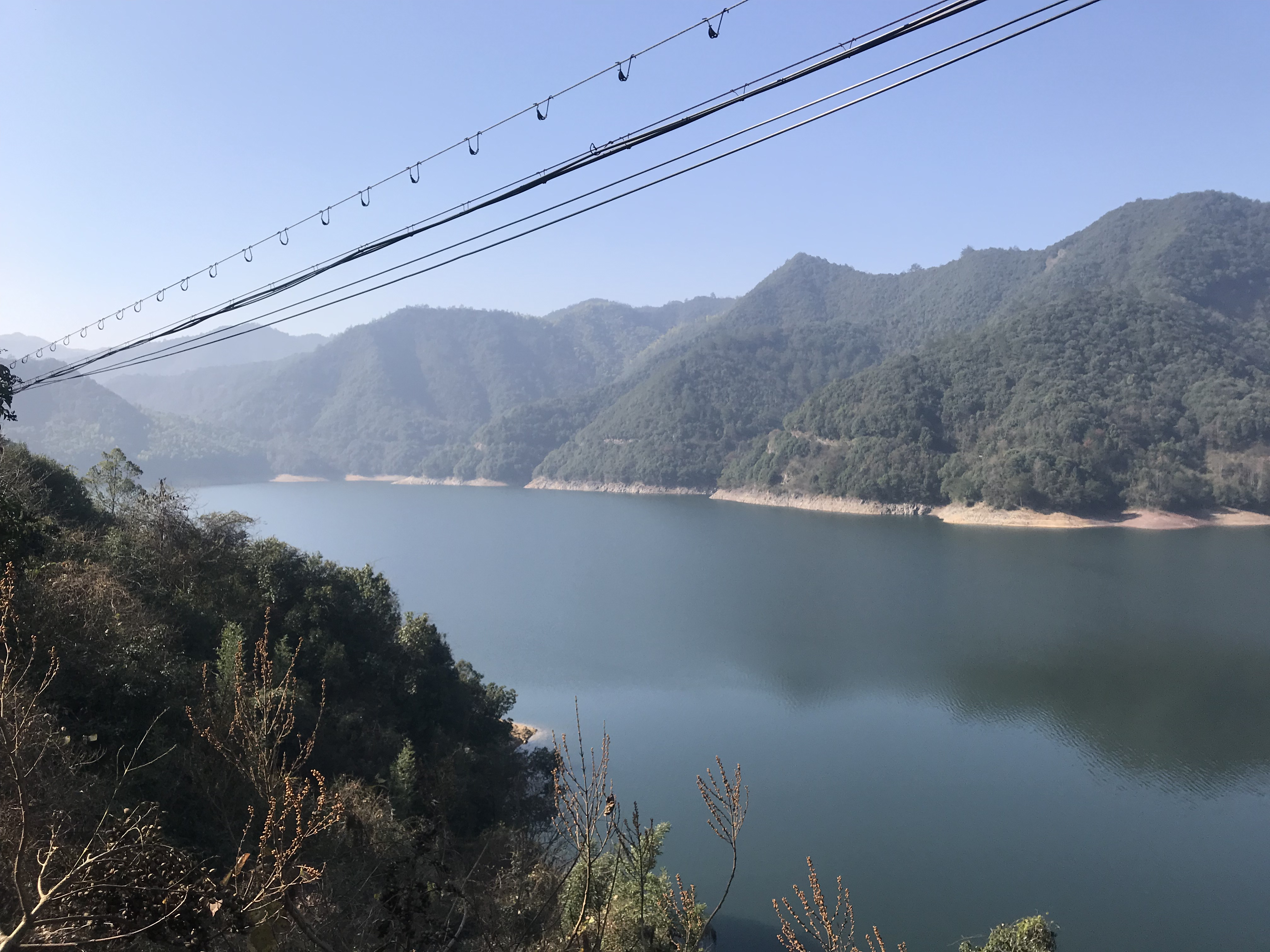
A corner of Andi Reservoir.

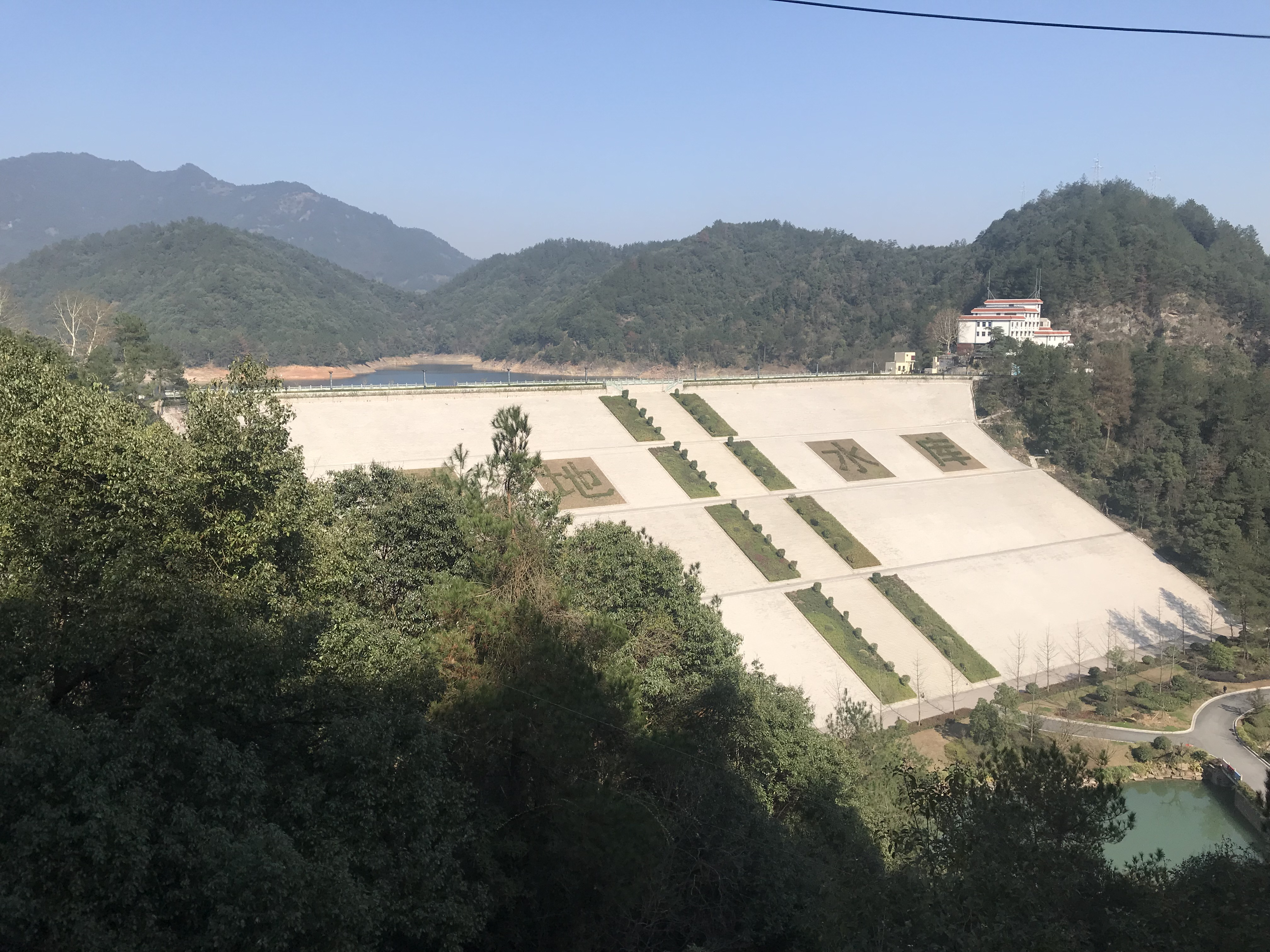
The dam of Andi Reservoir.
