= Jinyidong line =

Rapid transit line in Jinhua, China

- Jinyidong
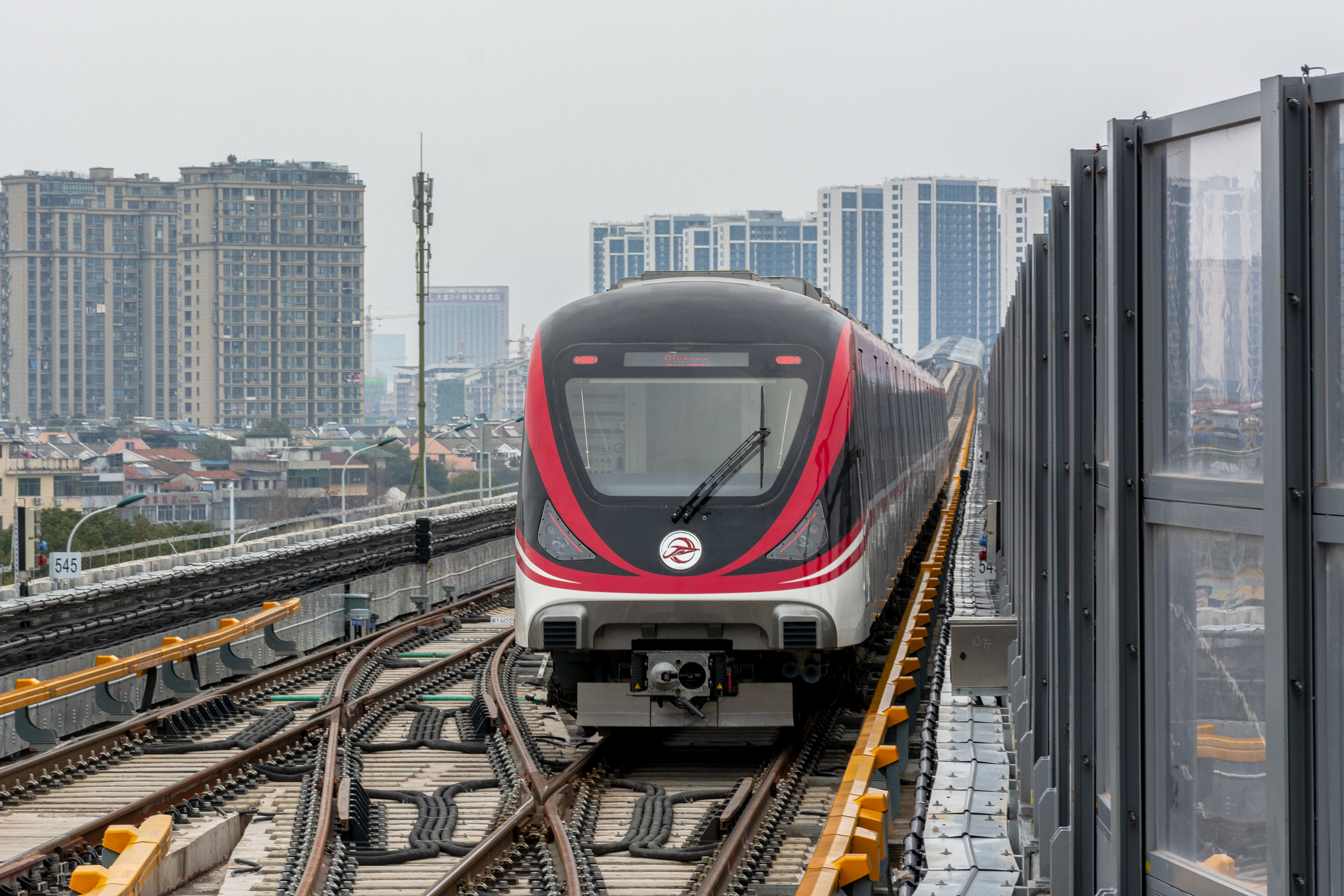
- Jinyidong Line train at Xiuhu Station, Yiwu

Overview
- Other names: Jinhua-Yiwu-Dongyang urban railway Jinhua Light Rail
- Status: Operational
- Locale: Jinhua; Yiwu and Dongyang, Zhejiang Province, China
- Termini: Jinhua Railway Station; Qintang
- Stations: 17 (Jinyi section); 15 (Yidong section)
- Website: www.jhmtr.net

Service
- Type: Rapid transit
- System: Jinhua Rail Transit
- Operator(s): Jinhua Rail Transit Group Co., Ltd.
- Rolling stock: 6-car Type B

History
- Opened: 30 August 2022 (Jinyi section); 28 December 2022 (Yidong section)

Technical
- Line length: 58.4 km (36.29 mi) (Jinyi section); 48.77 km (30.30 mi) (Yidong section)
- Number of tracks: 2
- Character: Underground and Elevated
- Track gauge: 1,435 mm (4 ft 8 1/2 in)
- Electrification: Third rail 1500 V DC
- Operating speed: 120 km/h (maximum speed)

Jinyidong Line (Chinese: 金义东线; pinyin: Jīnyìdōng xiàn) of the Jinhua Rail Transit is a suburban rapid transit line in Jinhua, Zhejiang Province, China. The name Jinyidong is derived from the first characters of Jinhua, Yiwu and Dongyang. Jinyidong line consist of two sections, Jinyi section (Jinhua to Yiwu) and Yidong section (Yiwu to Dongyang). The line is colored red on official system maps.

== History ==
=== Jinyi section ===
Jinyi section opened on 30 August 2022.

=== Yidong section ===
Part of Yidong section, from Lingyun to Sports Center, opened on 28 December 2022. Ming & Qing Dynasty Palaces station opened on 7 April 2023, and Hengdian Railway Station opened on 6 September 2024.

== Stations ==
=== Jinyi section ===
Service Routes		Station name		Transfer	Distance km		Location
Local	Rapid	English	Chinese	Transfer	Distance km		Location
●	●	Jinhua Railway Station	金华站	JBH	0.125	0.125	Wucheng District
●	|	West Shuangxi Road	双溪西路			2.465	Wucheng District
●	●	South Bayi Street	八一南街			4.122	Wucheng District
●	|	Wanda Plaza	万达广场			6.378	Jindong District
●	|	Dayanhe Street	大堰河街			9.249	Jindong District
●	|	Railway Building	轨道大厦			11.054	Jindong District
●	●	Jinhuanan Railway Station	金华南站	RNH		14.318	Jindong District
●	|	Tangya	塘雅			24.291	Jindong District
|	|	Depot	车辆段			n/a	Jindong District
●	●	Comprehensive Bonded Zone	综保区			29.338	Jindong District
●	|	Xinqu	新区				Jindong District
●	|	Donghua Street	东华街				Jindong District
●	●	Yiting	义亭				Yiwu
●	|	Guantang	官塘				Yiwu
●	|	Choujiang	稠江				Yiwu
●	●	Xiuhu	绣湖				Yiwu
●	●	Qintang	秦塘	Yidong Section			Yiwu
	through train to/from Ming & Qing Dynasty Palaces (rapid trains only)						

=== Yidong section ===
Service Routes		Station name		Transfer	Distance km	Location
Local	Rapid	English	Chinese	Transfer	Distance km	Location
		Yiwu Railway Station	义乌高铁站			Yiwu
●	through train to/from Jinhua Railway Station	Lingyun	凌云			Yiwu
●	through train to/from Jinhua Railway Station	Chunhan	春晗			Yiwu
●	●	Qintang	秦塘	Jinyi Section		Yiwu
●	|	International Trade Center	国际商贸城			Yiwu
●	|	The Fourth Affiliated Hospital; Zhejiang University School of Medicine	浙医四院			Yiwu
●	|	Jiangdong	江东			Yiwu
●	|	Woodcarvings Center	木雕城			Dongyang
●	|	Geshan Road	歌山路			Dongyang
●	●	Renmin Road	人民路			Dongyang
●	|	Conference & Exhibition Center	会展中心			Dongyang
●	|	Sports Center	体育馆			Dongyang
●	●	Hengdian Railway Station	横店高铁站	HJU		Dongyang
●	●	Ming & Qing Dynasty Palaces	明清宫			Dongyang
