= Jinhua Rail Transit =

Rail transit system in Jinhua City, Zhejiang, China

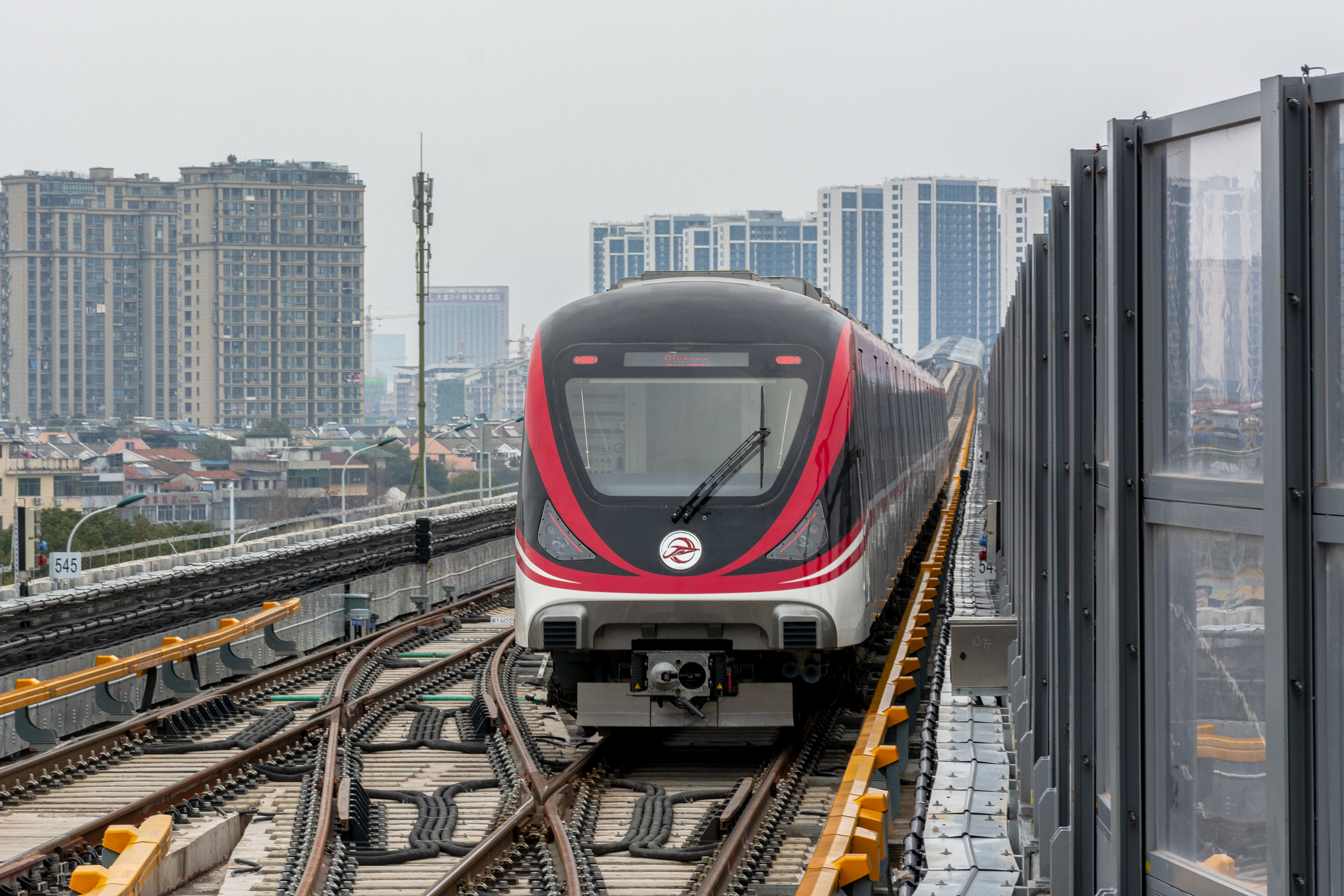
- Jinyidong Line train at Xiuhu Station, Yiwu

Overview
- Locale: Jinhua, Zhejiang Province, China
- Transit type: Rapid Transit
- Number of lines: 2
- Number of stations: 30
- Website: www.jhmtr.net

Operation
- Began operation: 30 August 2022; 4 years ago
- Operators: Jinhua Rail Transit Group Co., Ltd.
- Character: Elevated and underground

Technical
- System length: 107 km (66.5 mi)
- Track gauge: 1,435 mm (4 ft 8 1/2 in)

Jinhua Rail Transit
- Simplified Chinese: 金华轨道交通
- Traditional Chinese: 金華軌道交通
Transcriptions
Standard Mandarin
- Hanyu Pinyin: Jīnhuá Guǐdào Jiāotōng

Jinhua Rail Transit (simplified Chinese: 金华轨道交通; traditional Chinese: 金華軌道交通; pinyin: Jīnhuá Guǐdào Jiāotōng) is a suburban rapid transit system in the prefecture-level city of Jinhua, in Zhejiang Province, China. It opened on 30 August 2022.

== History ==
A groundbreaking ceremony was held on 28 July 2017. The Jinyi section of the Jinyidong line opened on 30 August 2022.

== Lines ==
The initial phase of construction will see two sections of the Jinyidong line (Jinyi section and Yidong section) built, with a total length of 107 kilometres (66 mi) and 30 stations.

Line	Termini (District)		Commencement	Newest Extension	Length km	Stations
Jinyi	Jinhua Railway Station (Wucheng District)	Qintang (Yiwu)	30 Aug 2022		58.4	17
Yidong	Yiwu Railway Station (Yiwu)	Ming & Qing Dynasty Palaces (Dongyang)	28 Dec 2022		48.77	15
Total					107.2	32

=== Jinyidong line ===
==== Jinyi section ====
The Jinyi section runs from Jinhua to Yiwu. It starts at the Jinhua railway station and heads east via Jinhua South railway station. It terminates at Qintang station. The Jinyi section opened on 30 August 2022. It is colored red on official system maps.

==== Yidong section ====
The Yidong section runs from Yiwu to Dongyang. It starts at Yiwu railway station and heads south. It terminates at Ming & Qing Dynasty Palaces station. Furthermore, it interchanges with the Jinyi section at Qintang station. The Yidong section is expected to open in late 2022. It is also colored red on official system maps.

=== Jinwuyongdong line (Planned) ===
Jinwuyongdong line, or Jinhua-Wuyi-Yongkang-Dongyang line, starts at Luodian and heads south. It terminates at Ming & Qing Dynasty Palaces station. It interchanges with the Yidong section at Ming & Qing Dynasty Palaces station and with the Jinyi section at South Bayi Street station. The line will be 111.7 kilometres (69.4 mi) in length and has 26 stations (15 underground, 11 elevated). The line is under planning.
