= Yiwu High School =

School in Yiwu, Zhejiang, China

Yiwu High School (YWHS; simplified Chinese: 义乌中学; traditional Chinese: 義烏中學; pinyin: Yìwū Zhōngxué), is a senior high school in Yiwu. It was founded in 1927.

== History ==
- June 1924 – August 1927: Yiwu County Secondary School was in its planning and preparation stage.
- September 1927: Yiwu County Junior High School was formally established, operating out of former sites including the county Confucian Temple and other historical shrines, and began enrolling students.
- April 1928: Feng Xuefeng joined the school as a teacher.
- Spring 1930: Chen Wangdao delivered his first lectures at the school.
- 1931–1936: The school added affiliated teacher-training programs, including one-year, three-year, and four-year tracks.
- 1938 – The school adopted the motto "诚正勤毅" ("honest, proper, diligent, resolute").
- 1938 – January 1946: During the Second Sino-Japanese War, the school was forced to relocate its campus ten times.
- June 1949: Administration of the school was taken over by the Yiwu County People’s Government.
- September 1952: Upper secondary classes were introduced, and the school was officially renamed Zhejiang Yiwu High School.
- 1966–1969: Student admissions were suspended.
- 1978: The school was designated as a senior high school at the county level.
- 1981: It was officially listed as a senior high school.
- August 1988: The school ceased admitting junior high students.
- September 1995: It became one of the first schools recognized as a provincial first-level senior high school.
- 2002: The school moved to its current campus.
