= Jinhua =

Jinhua 金华市 Kinhwa, Tsin Ua
- Prefecture-level city
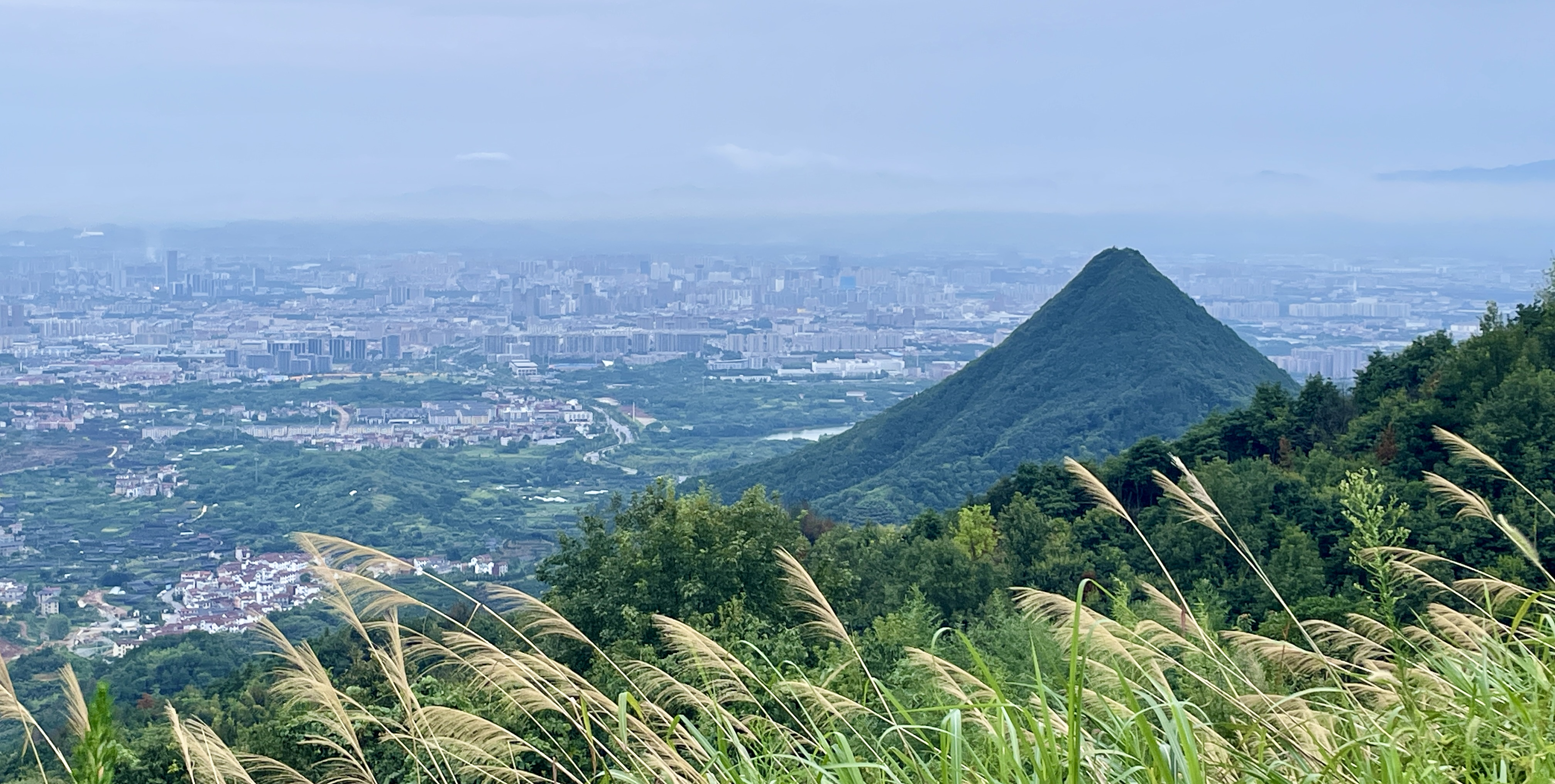
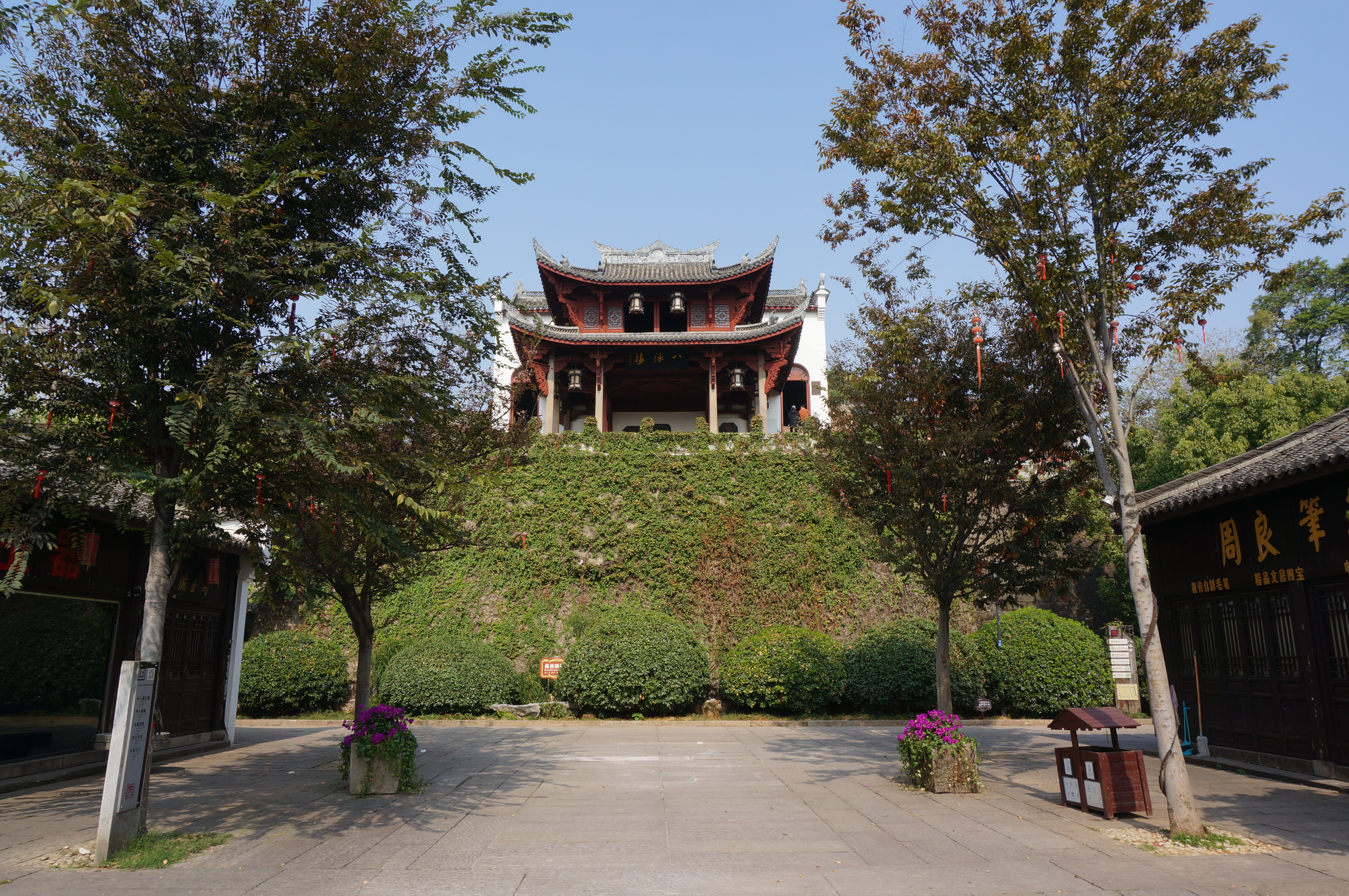
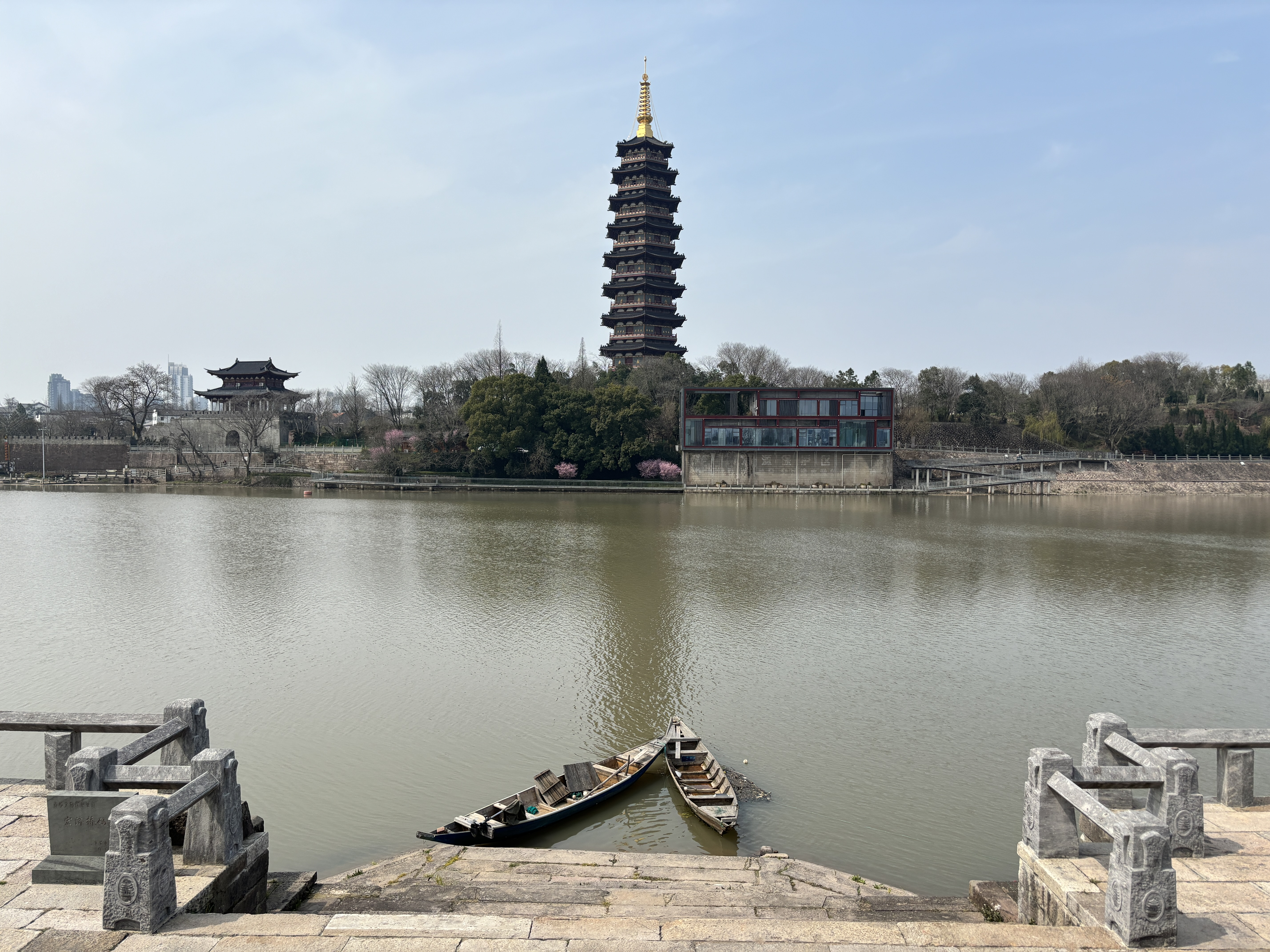
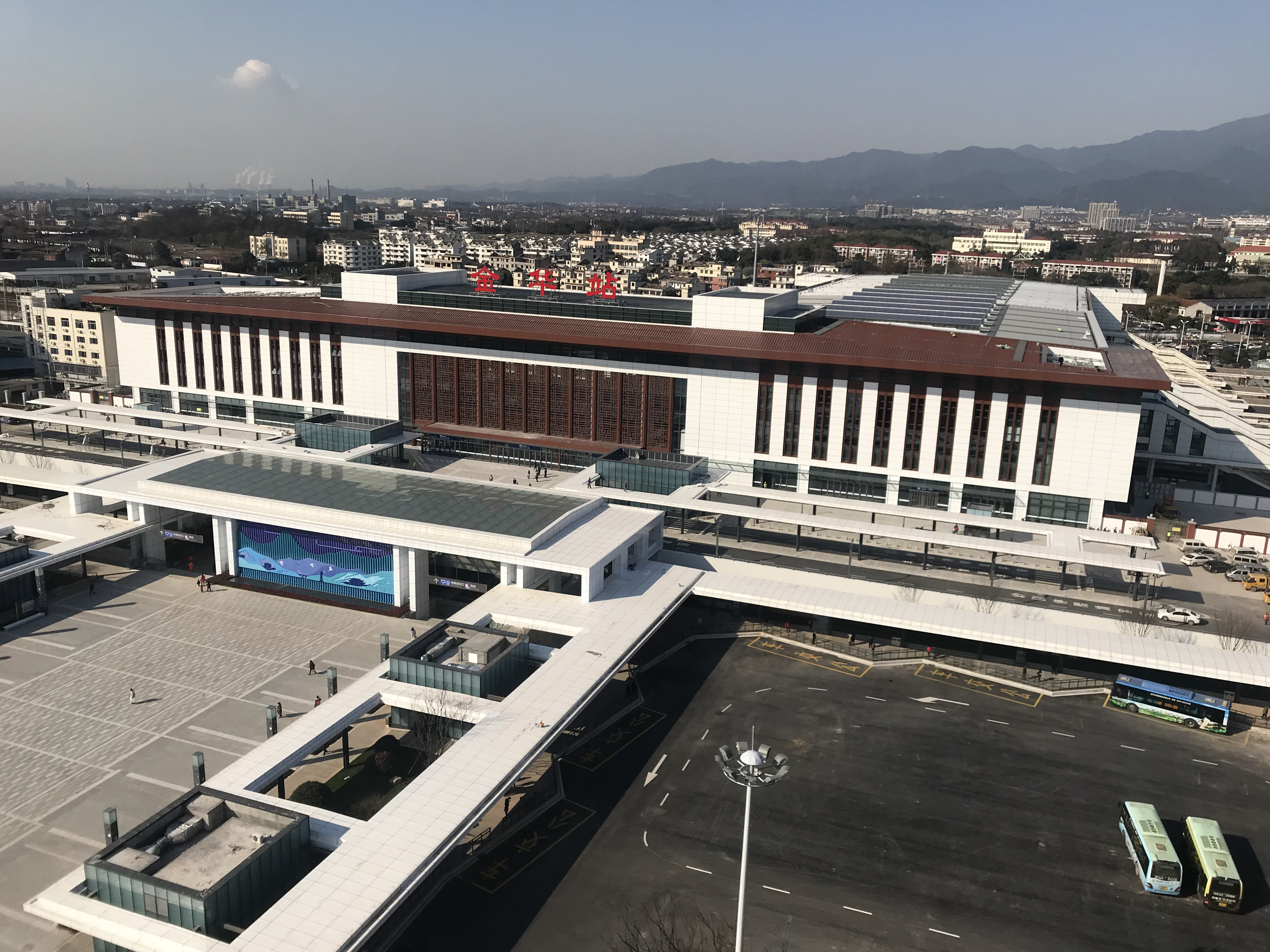
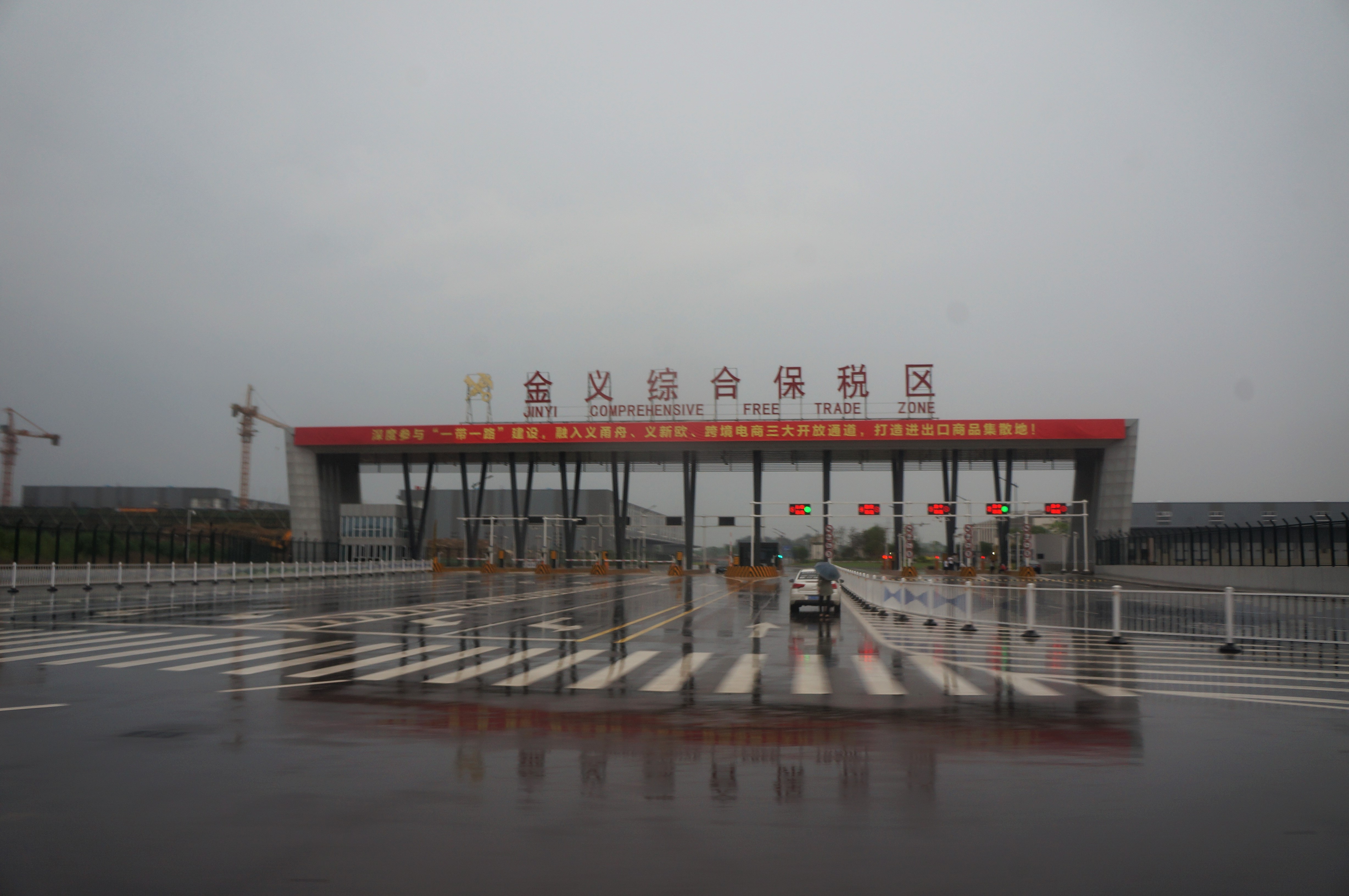
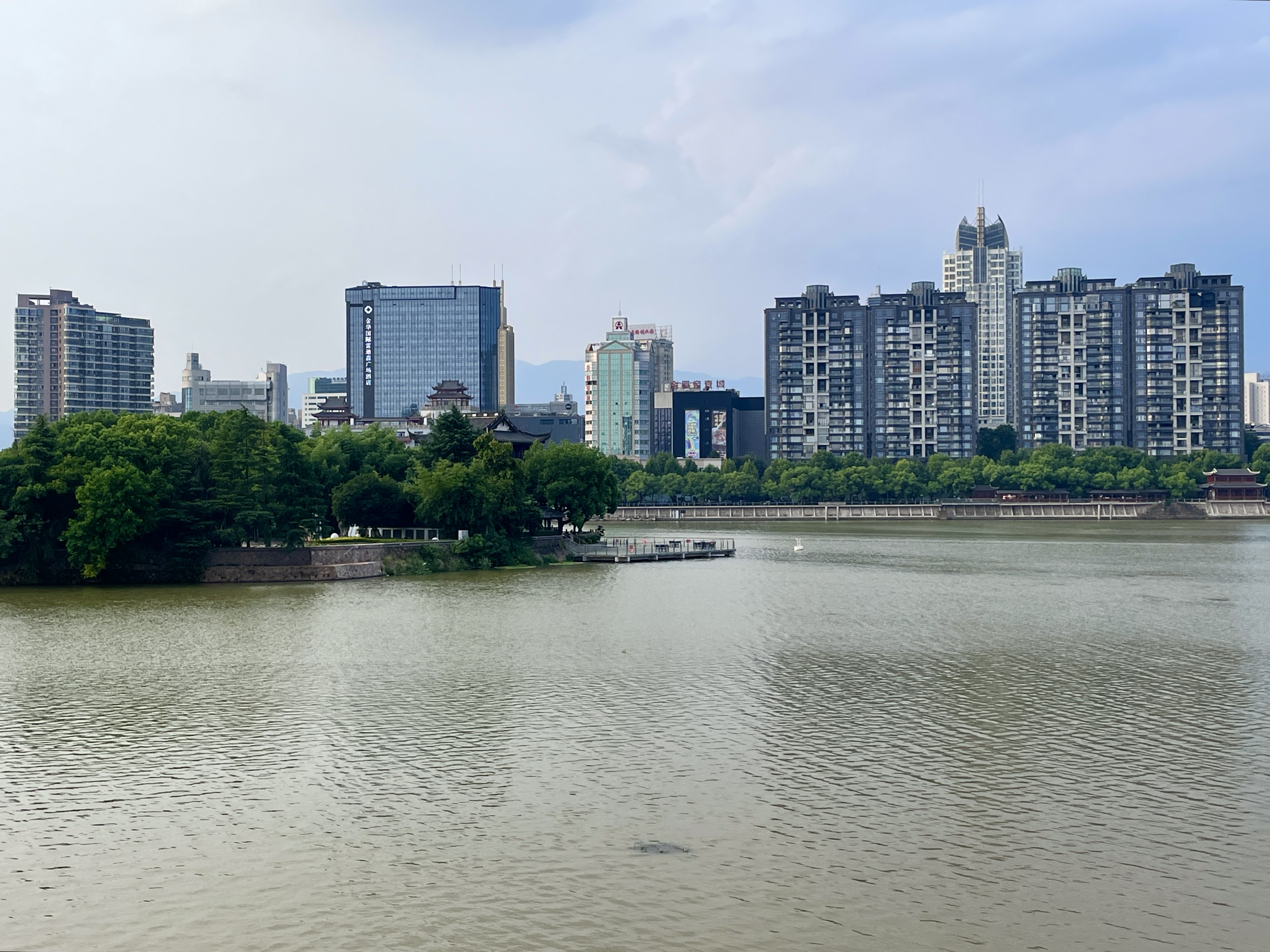
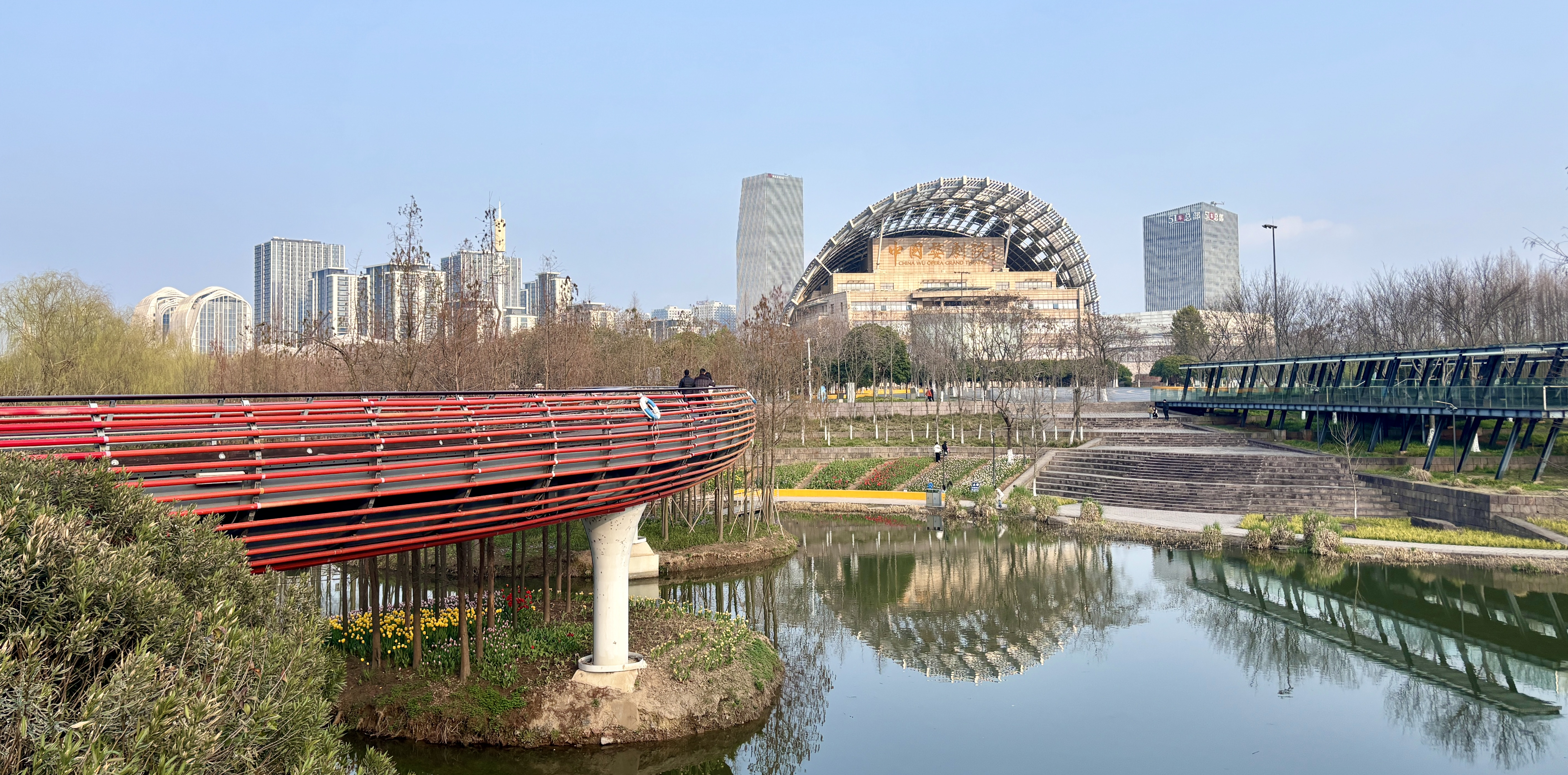
- Views of Jinhua City center from Jinhua Mountains Bayonglou Wanfo Pagoda Jinhua Railway Station Jinhua-Yiwu New District Old City Center in Wucheng District Yanweizhou Park

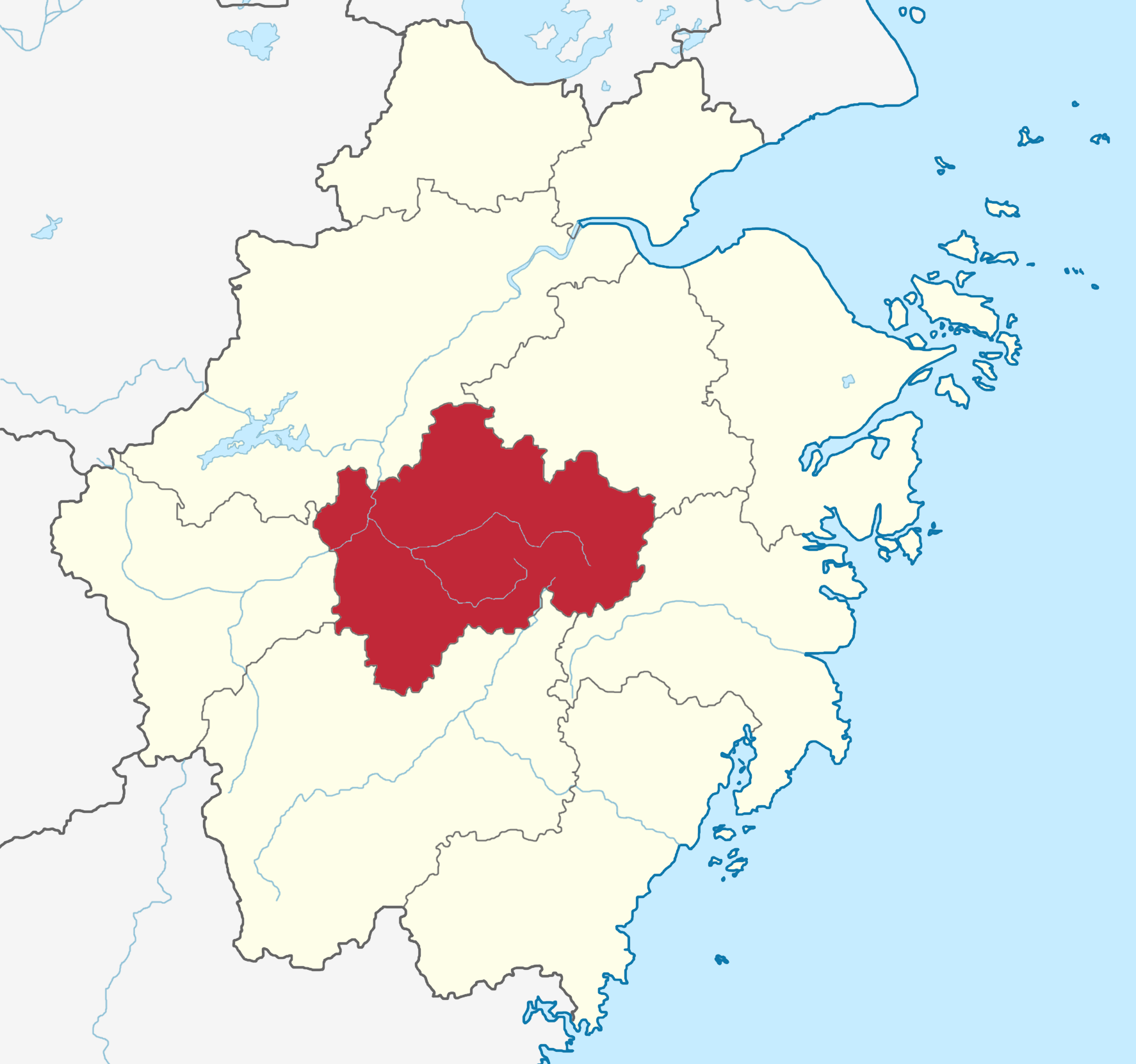
- Location of Jinhua City jurisdiction in Zhejiang
- Interactive map of Jinhua
- Coordinates (Jinhua municipal government): 29°04′44″N 119°38′49″E
- Country: People's Republic of China
- Province: Zhejiang
- County-level divisions: 9
- Township-level divisions: 191
- Municipal seat: Wucheng District

Government
  - Party Secretary: Zhao Guangjun (赵光军)
  - Mayor: Ji Junmin (暨军民)

Area
  - Prefecture-level city: 10,926.16 km^{2} (4,218.61 sq mi)
  - Urban: 2,049.5 km^{2} (791.3 sq mi)
  - Metro: 2,049.5 km^{2} (791.3 sq mi)

Population (2020 census)
  - Prefecture-level city: 7,050,683
  - Density: 645.3029/km^{2} (1,671.327/sq mi)
  - Urban: 1,463,990
  - Urban density: 714.32/km^{2} (1,850.1/sq mi)
  - Metro: 1,463,990
  - Metro density: 714.32/km^{2} (1,850.1/sq mi)

GDP
  - Prefecture-level city: CN¥ 470.4 billion US$ 62.0 billion
  - Per capita: CN¥ 72,192; US$ 11,096
- Time zone: UTC+8 (China Standard)
- Area code: 579
- ISO 3166 code: CN-ZJ-07
- License Plate Prefix: 浙G
- City flower: Camellia

Jinhua
- "Jinhua" in Simplified (top) and Traditional (bottom) Chinese characters
- Simplified Chinese: 金华
- Traditional Chinese: 金華
- Literal meaning: "Golden Flourishing"
Transcriptions
Standard Mandarin
- Hanyu Pinyin: Jīnhuá
- Wade–Giles: Chin^{1}-hua^{4}
- IPA: [tɕín.xwǎ]

Jinhua (Note: ; alternately romanized as Kinhwa) is a prefecture-level city in central-western Zhejiang province in eastern China. It borders the provincial capital of Hangzhou to the northwest, Quzhou to the southwest, Lishui to the south, Taizhou to the east, and Shaoxing to the northeast. Its population was 7,050,683 as of the 2020 census including 1,463,990 in the built-up (or metro) area made of two urban districts (not including yet the satellite city of Lanxi, which has become essentially a suburban offshoot of Jinhua's main urban area).

Jinhua is rich in red soil and forest resources. The Jinhua or Wu River flows through the Lan and Fuchun to the Qiantang River beside Hangzhou, which flows into Hangzhou Bay and the East China Sea. In medieval China, it formed part of the water network feeding supplies to the southern end of the Grand Canal. It is best known for its dry-cured Jinhua ham.

== History and culture ==
The history of Jinhua dates back to the 2nd century BC, when it was a county subordinate to Shaoxing. It was given the name Jinhua under the Sui dynasty in AD 598 and later became the seat of a prefecture. The present city and its walls date to the Yuan dynasty in 1352.

The most famous native of Jinhua is Huang Chuping, a Daoist holy man of the 4th century and reputed immortal whose descendants still live in the area. Wuyang Shan ("Reclining Sheep Mountain") is said to be a sheep which was turned to stone by Huang, a trick which he learned through his years of diligently studying Daoism.

Economically Jinhua has always prospered from its position as the regional collecting and processing center for agricultural and forestry products (chiefly rice and bamboo). It is currently the second most important grain producing area in Zhejiang. In 1985 Jinhua was promoted to City status, and now is responsible for administering four cities, three counties and two districts. Animals raised there include dairy cattle, meat hogs (for the production of Jinhua ham, a famous local product for 900 years) and honeybees. Jinhua's industrial sector has developed more recently, producing machinery, metallurgy, pharmaceuticals, building supplies and electrical and electronic equipment.

The Tang dynasty painter Guan Xiu (Kuan-hsiu) was born in Jinhua. He is known for his paintings of Buddhist holy men.

There are numerous scenic and historical sites in the Jinhua region, including many places associated with the Immortal Huang, and a palace of the Dukes of the Taiping Heavenly Kingdom.

== Geography ==
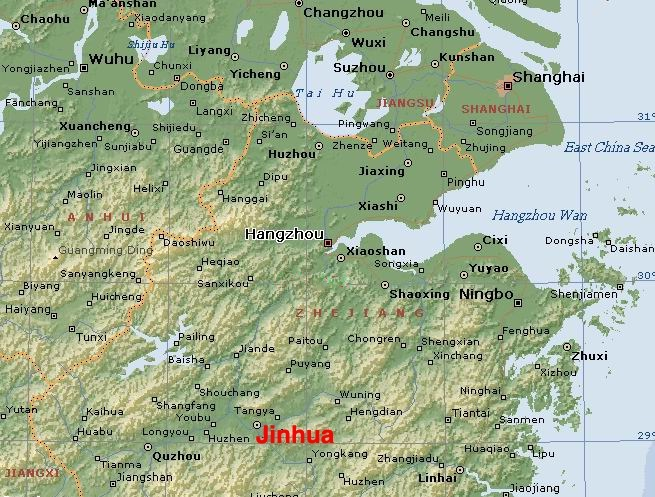
Jinhua in the Yangtze River Delta

Jinhua is located at latitudes 28° 32'−29° 41' N and longitudes 119° 14'−120° 46' E in the center of Zhejiang. It borders Hangzhou to the northwest, Quzhou to the southwest, Lishui to the south, Taizhou to the east, and Shaoxing to the northeast.

=== Climate ===
Jinhua has a humid subtropical climate (Köppen Cfa) with four distinctive seasons, characterised by hot, humid summers and chilly, cloudy and drier winters (with occasional snow). The mean annual temperature is 17.33 °C (63.2 °F), with monthly daily averages ranging from 5.2 °C (41.4 °F) in January to 29.0 °C (84.2 °F) in July. The city receives an average annual rainfall of 1,450 millimetres (57.1 in) and is affected by the plum rains of the Asian monsoon in June, when average relative humidity also peaks.

Climate data for Jinhua, elevation 63 m (207 ft), (1991–2020 normals, extremes 1971–present)
Month	Jan	Feb	Mar	Apr	May	Jun	Jul	Aug	Sep	Oct	Nov	Dec	Year
Record high °C (°F)	25.4 (77.7)	29.4 (84.9)	34.8 (94.6)	34.5 (94.1)	36.6 (97.9)	37.6 (99.7)	40.7 (105.3)	42.0 (107.6)	39.6 (103.3)	35.9 (96.6)	31.3 (88.3)	24.5 (76.1)	42.0 (107.6)
Mean daily maximum °C (°F)	9.9 (49.8)	12.6 (54.7)	16.9 (62.4)	23.1 (73.6)	27.7 (81.9)	29.8 (85.6)	34.6 (94.3)	34.1 (93.4)	29.6 (85.3)	24.6 (76.3)	18.8 (65.8)	12.5 (54.5)	22.8 (73.1)
Daily mean °C (°F)	6.0 (42.8)	8.2 (46.8)	12.2 (54.0)	18.1 (64.6)	22.9 (73.2)	25.6 (78.1)	29.8 (85.6)	29.3 (84.7)	25.2 (77.4)	20.0 (68.0)	14.2 (57.6)	8.2 (46.8)	18.3 (65.0)
Mean daily minimum °C (°F)	3.2 (37.8)	5.1 (41.2)	8.8 (47.8)	14.2 (57.6)	19.1 (66.4)	22.5 (72.5)	26.1 (79.0)	25.8 (78.4)	21.9 (71.4)	16.4 (61.5)	10.8 (51.4)	5.0 (41.0)	14.9 (58.8)
Record low °C (°F)	−9.6 (14.7)	−8.9 (16.0)	−1.6 (29.1)	0.6 (33.1)	8.7 (47.7)	13.3 (55.9)	18.8 (65.8)	18.6 (65.5)	13.1 (55.6)	2.4 (36.3)	−2.7 (27.1)	−6.8 (19.8)	−9.6 (14.7)
Average precipitation mm (inches)	83.7 (3.30)	89.9 (3.54)	160.6 (6.32)	157.0 (6.18)	179.4 (7.06)	289.9 (11.41)	149.9 (5.90)	129.9 (5.11)	84.9 (3.34)	49.6 (1.95)	72.4 (2.85)	65.4 (2.57)	1,512.6 (59.53)
Average precipitation days (≥ 0.1 mm)	13.5	13.1	17.1	15.7	15.8	17.4	11.7	12.9	10.3	7.7	10.5	10.3	156
Average snowy days	3.7	2.4	0.4	0	0	0	0	0	0	0	0.1	1.4	8
Average relative humidity (%)	74	73	72	71	71	77	69	70	73	70	73	72	72
Mean monthly sunshine hours	93.7	97.2	116.1	139.1	157.7	134.7	235.6	219.4	163.4	157.7	124.5	120.5	1,759.6
Percentage possible sunshine	29	31	31	36	37	32	55	54	45	45	39	38	39
Source 1: China Meteorological Administration all-time extreme temperature
Source 2: Weather China

== Administrative divisions ==
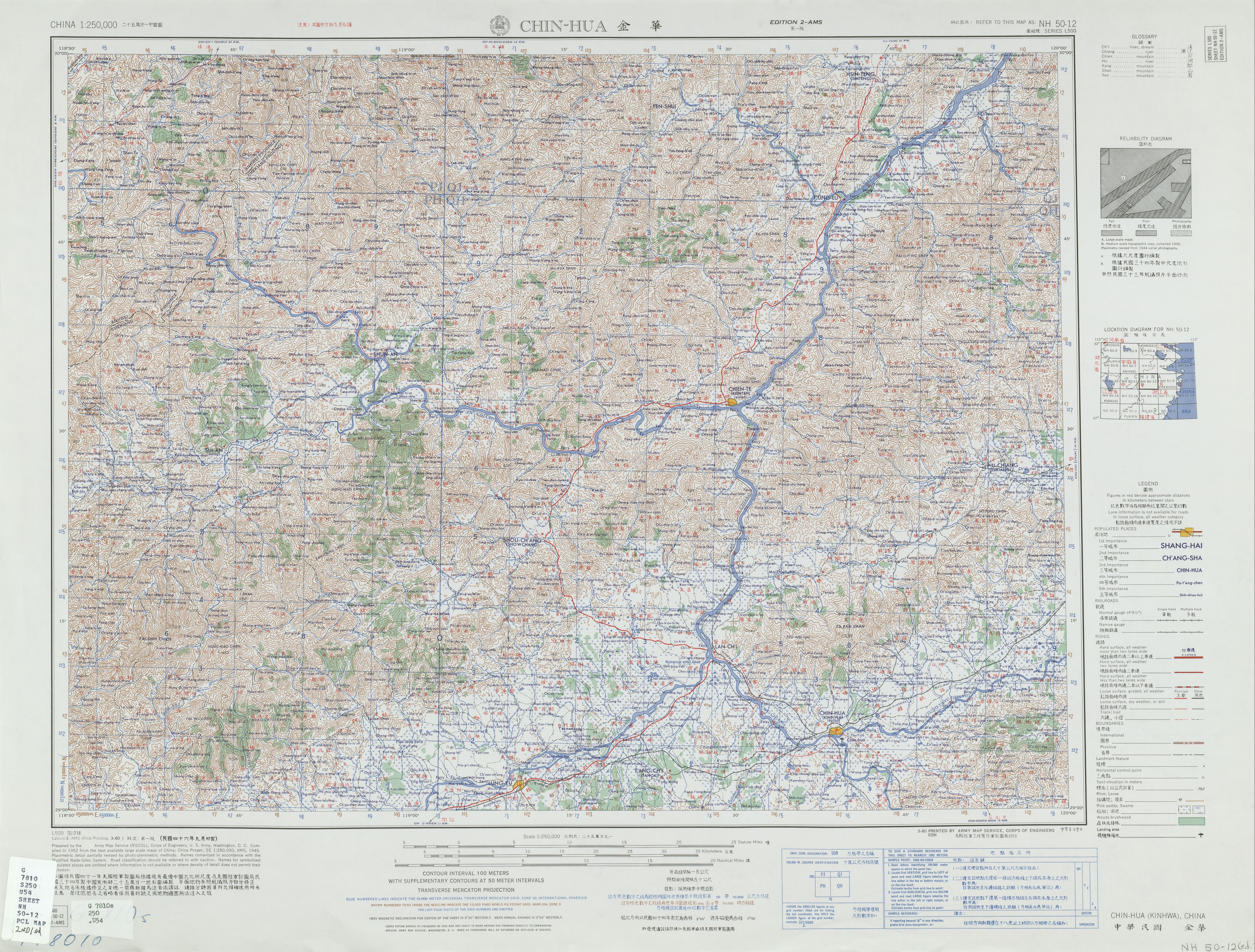
Map including Jinhua (labeled as CHIN-HUA (KINHWA) (walled) 金華) (AMS, 1952)

The prefecture-level city of Jinhua administers 9 county-level divisions, including 2 districts, 4 county-level cities and 3 counties.

Map
Subdivision	Simplified Chinese	Pinyin
Wucheng District	婺城区	Wùchéng Qū
Jindong District	金东区	Jīndōng Qū
Lanxi	兰溪市	Lánxī Shì
Yongkang	永康市	Yǒngkāng Shì
Yiwu	义乌市	Yìwū Shì
Dongyang	东阳市	Dōngyáng Shì
Wuyi County	武义县	Wǔyì Xiàn
Pujiang County	浦江县	Pǔjiāng Xiàn
Pan'an County	磐安县	Pán'ān Xiàn

These are further divided into 191 township-level divisions, including 107 towns, 73 townships and 11 subdistricts.

== Architecture ==
Jinhua architecture, also known as Wu-school architecture, is a style of traditional Chinese architecture that is characterized by large apartments, large courtyards, large open halls, horse-head walls. This style is different from the courtyard houses in Beijing and the earth buildings in Fujian.

Representative of the Ming and Qing Dynasty residences, Jinhua architecture typically features a clear central axis and a symmetrical layout. These buildings were often constructed by the royal family or the descendants of Confucianism, and served as both living spaces and cultural artifacts that reflect the values and beliefs of Confucianism.

The common characteristic of Confucian inheritance is the emphasis on respecting teachers, education, law, and rules. This philosophy is reflected in the spatial design and construction of Jinhua architecture. These houses are built with a harmonious balance between Yin and Yang and embody symmetry and balance.

== Economy ==
Jinhua has a rather flexible economic system with distinctive economic characteristics in different areas. 90% of enterprises are in and about 88% of its GDP are from private sector.

=== Industry ===
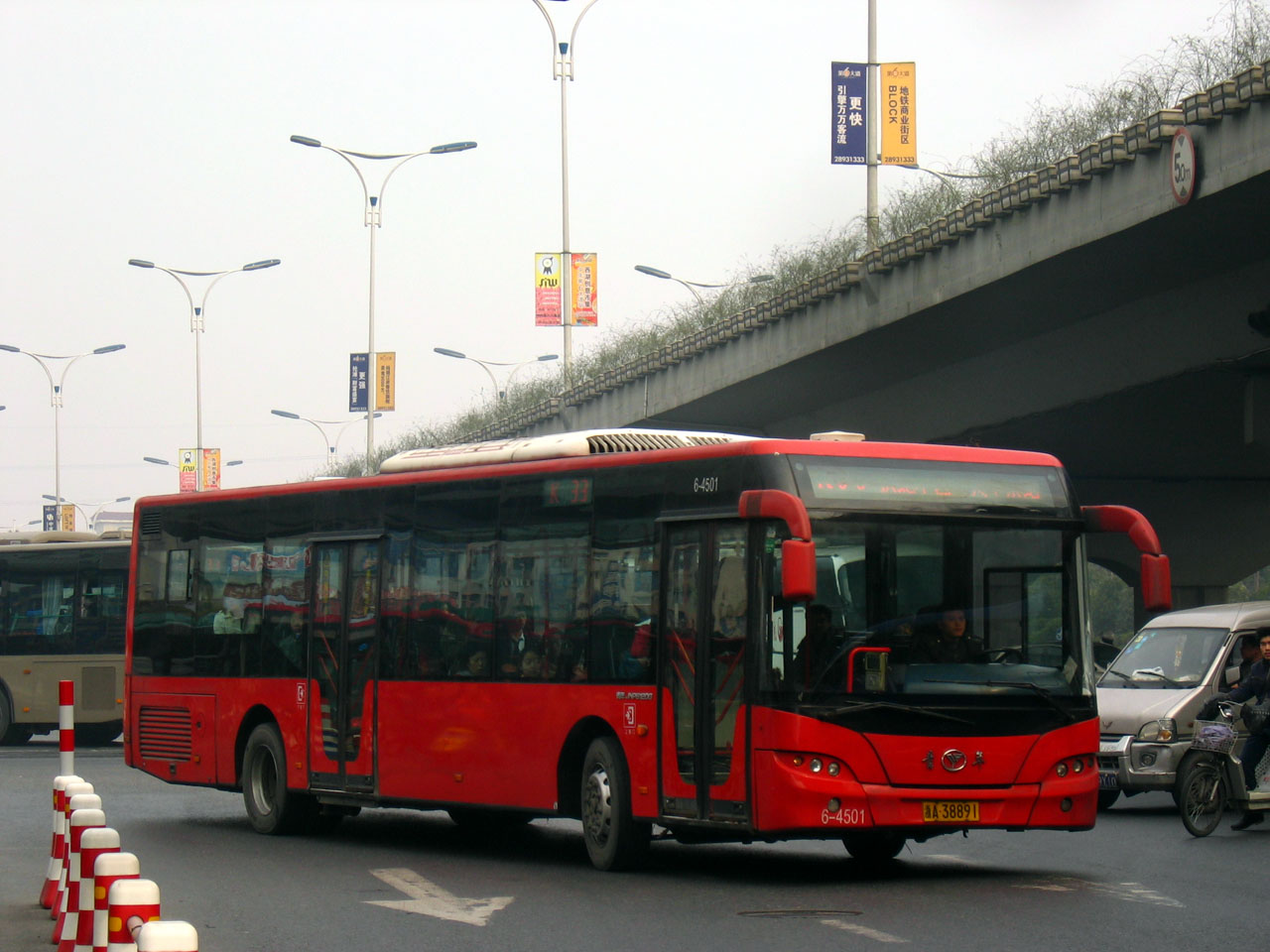
A bus made by the local Jinhua Youngman Vehicle factory.

Jinhua enjoys an advanced civilian-owned economy, with its industry mainly supported by processing and manufacturing. Leading industries of the city include clothing and textile, mechanics and electronics, pharmacy and chemistry, manufacturing crafts, metalwork processing architecture and building materials, automobile-and-motorcycle accessories, food processing, and plastic ware.

Industries are distributed with different characteristics in different counties or county-level cities. For instance, Yiwu is characterized by its light-industry commodities, Yongkang by its automobile-and-motorcycle accessories and mechanical and electric tools, Dongyang by its clothing, architecture and magnetic materials, the Jinhua Proper by its pharmacy, construction materials and industrial measures, Lanxi by its non-ferrous metal, cement, towels and daily chemicals, and Pujiang by its textile, lockmaking, and lantern ornaments of crystals.

==== Handicrafts ====
Traditional handicrafts have been flourishing in Jinhua, such as the wood carving and bamboo weaving in Dongyang, the straw plaiting, lace purling and crystals carving in Pujiang, and the hardware crafts in Yongkang.

== Education ==
=== Higher education ===
There are 2 major colleges / universities in Jinhua: the provincial public university Zhejiang Normal University (ZJNU), and the municipal public university Jinhua University of Vocational Technology.

=== High schools ===
Major provincial key high schools in Jinhua include Jinhua No. 1 High School, High School Affiliated to Zhejiang Normal University, Aiqing High School, Jinhua Tangxi Senior High School, Jinhua Foreign Language School, Lanxi No. 1 High School, Zhejiang Dongyang High School, Zhejiang Yiwu High School, Yiwu No. 2 High School, Yongkang No. 1 Senior Middle School, Zhejiang Pujiang High School, Wuyi No. 1 High School, and Pan'an High School.

=== International cooperations ===
Many education cooperations happen in Jinhua. Jinhua has been leading China-Africa education cooperation since the 1980s with the help of colleges and universities. Zhejiang Normal University began to recruit short-term international students in China in the 1980s. To date, the university has trained more than 8,000 African students in the Chinese language, international education in Chinese, business administration, comparative education, software engineering, mechanical design, and manufacturing and automation.

== Cuisine ==
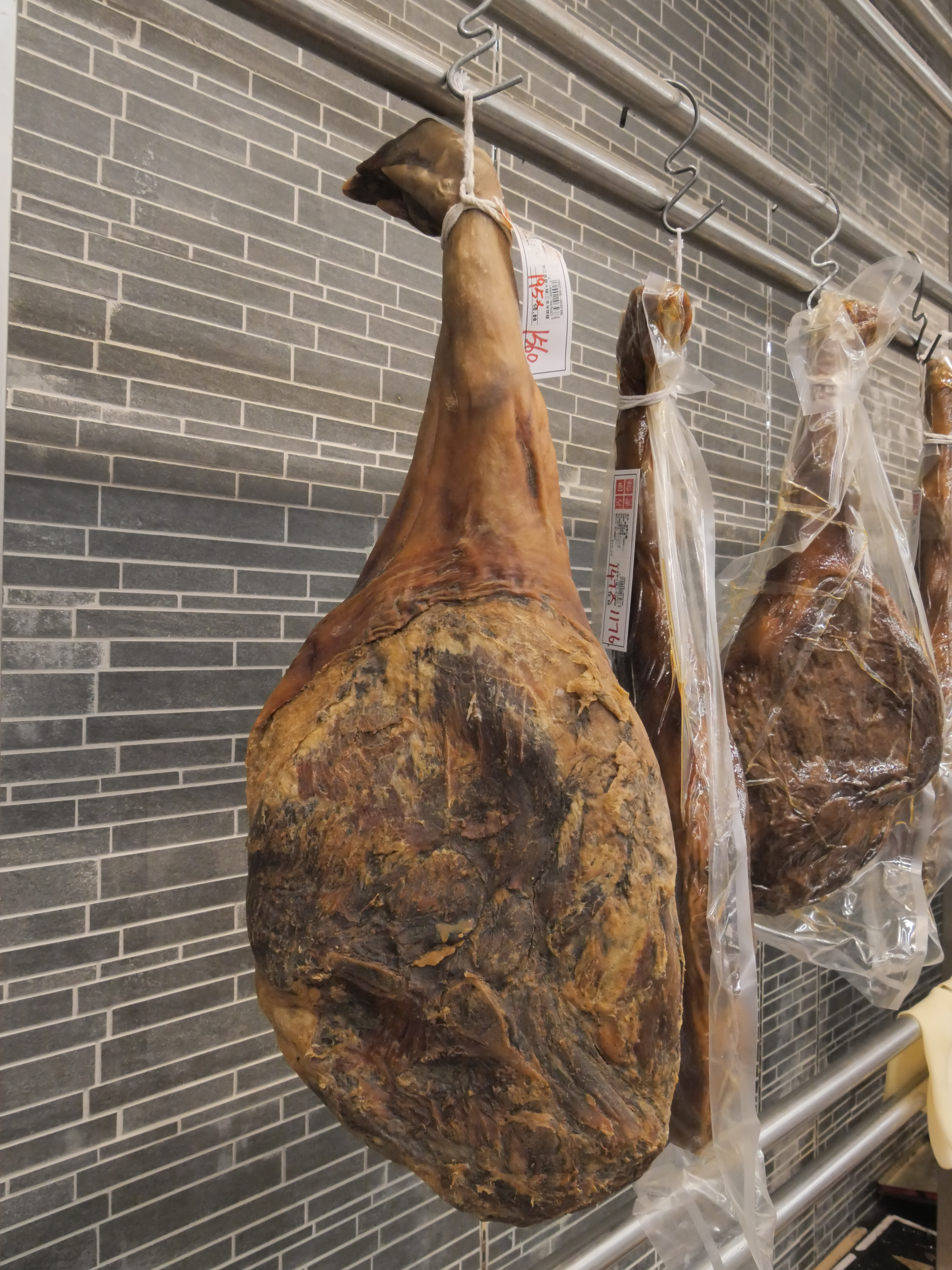
Jinhua ham is a specialty of Jinhua

=== Jinhua ham ===
Jinhua ham has bright colors, with red and white hues. The lean meat has a sweetness, while the fat imparts a flavor without being overly greasy. It is a rich source of protein, fat, multiple vitamins and minerals. Jinhua ham is produced during winter and matured throughout the summer, which allows for fermentation. Its consumption is associated with various health benefits, such as nourishing the stomach and kidneys, strengthening bone marrow, and promoting wound healing.

Jinhua ham features thin skin, with bright yellow skin and a lute-like shape. Its flesh is red and aromatic, earning it the reputation of the "four perfections" for its combination of color, fragrance, taste, and shape.

=== Yongkang Roumaibing ===
Yongkang Roumaibing (meat patties) is a traditional snack of Yongkang. Throughout Yongkang's history, local farmers have prepared meat patties as a staple dish during harvest festivals. Despite its coarse appearance, Yongkang meat patties are regarded and deemed as an example of the idiom "Don't judge a book by its cover."

Yongkang meat patties are generally divided into two types. One is the thin patty (also known as the triangle patty), which is flat and large in area. The whole thin patty is cut into several triangle patties and sold with pork and dried vegetable filling. The other is the thick patty, a thicker, smaller patty filled with potato, tofu, cowpea, lotus root, etc.

== Transportation ==
=== Railways ===
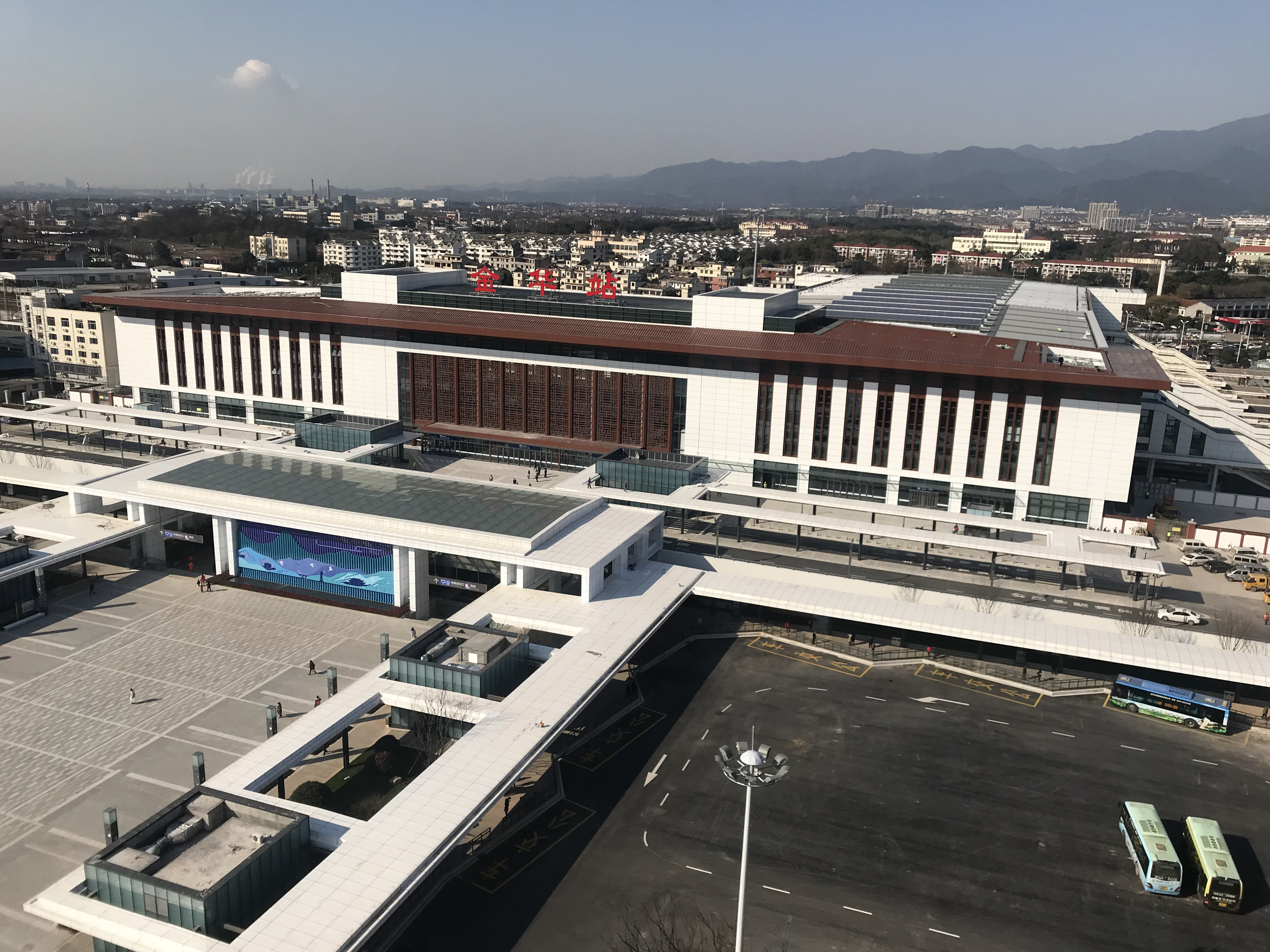
Jinhua railway station

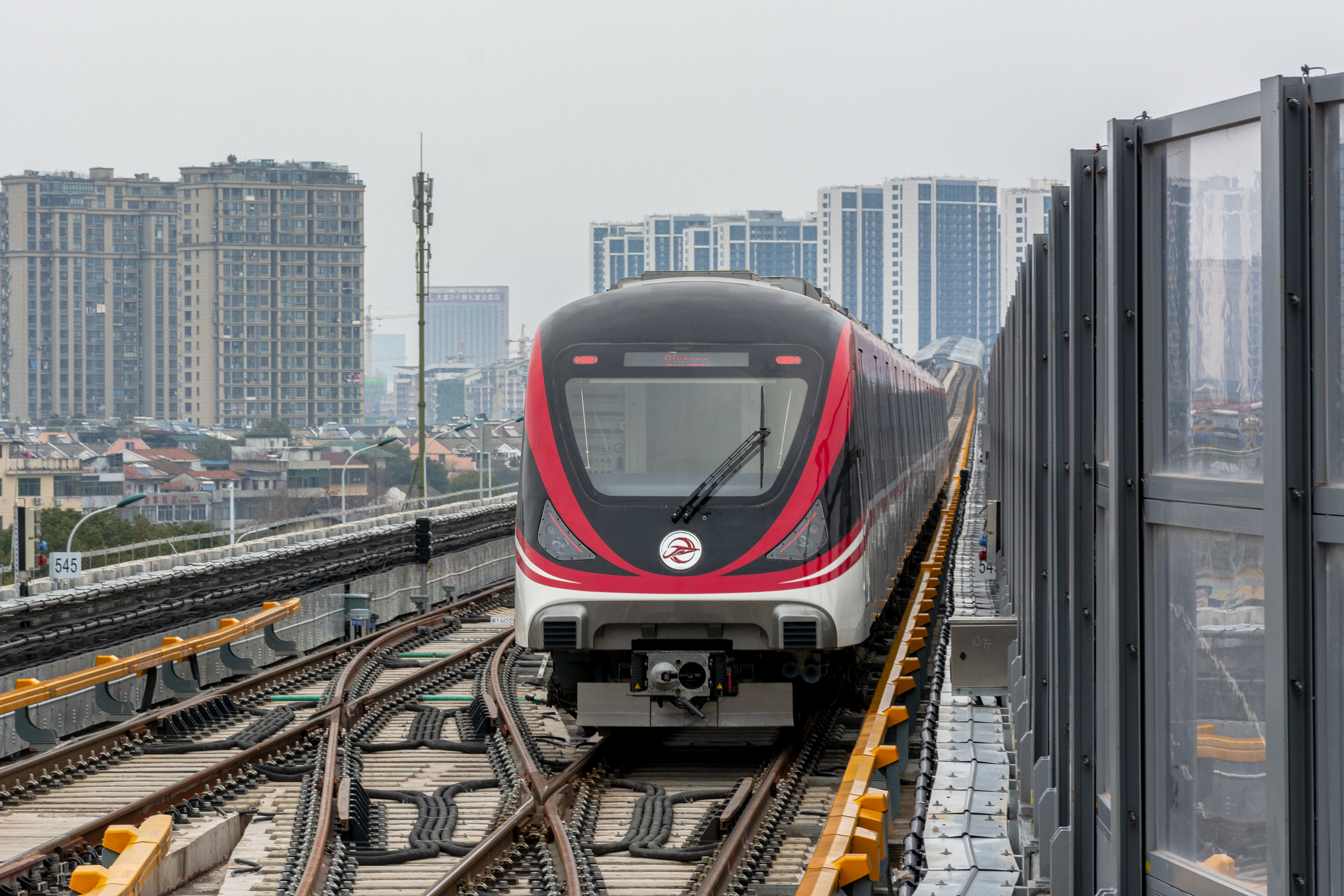
Jinyidong Line train at Xiuhu Station, Yiwu

Main railway stations:

- Jinhua railway station
- Jinhuanan railway station
- Yiwu railway station

Jinhua enjoys convenient transportation, being the communications center in southeast China between coastal and inland areas. It is one of the major hubs of land transportation in the country. The Zhejiang-Jiangxi, Jinhua-Wenzhou and Jinhua-Qiandaohu railways intersect in the city. The Hangzhou-Jinhua-Quzhou Expressway, the Jinhua-Lishui-Wenzhou Expressway, the No. 330 and 320 National Highways, and other provincial highroads traverse the area. The city aggregation around Jinhua Proper has formed a "Half-an-Hour's-Ride Economic Circle", there being merely a 90-minute and a 3-hour journey driving from the city to Hangzhou and Shanghai respectively.

=== Public transit ===
==== Metro ====
Jinhua Rail Transit is a metro system in Jinhua. Jinyidong Line connects the 2 districts of Jinhua to Yiwu and Dongyang. It was opened on August 30, 2022.

=== Airports ===
Yiwu Airport provides service to major cities in China mainland and Hong Kong.

== Landmarks ==
Jinhua Architecture Park, a collection of 17 pavilions designed by Chinese and international architects, is set on the banks of the Yiwu River.

== Demographics ==
According to the Seventh National Census in 2020, the city's Permanent Population (hukou) was 7,050,683. Compared with 5,361,572 people in the Sixth National Census in 2010, there was a total increase of 1,689,111 people over the decade, an increase of 31.5%, and an average annual growth rate of 2.78%. In the city's population, the male population was 3,716,342, accounting for 52.71%, and the female population was 3,334,341, accounting for 47.29%. The sex ratio of the total population (100 females, male to female ratio) was 111.46, an increase of 3.96 compared with the sixth national census in 2010.

== Notable people ==
- Chen Wei
- Guo Guangchang
- Hu Hailan
- Pan Jianwei
- Lou Jiwei
