= Jindong, Jinhua =

Jindong 金东区
- District
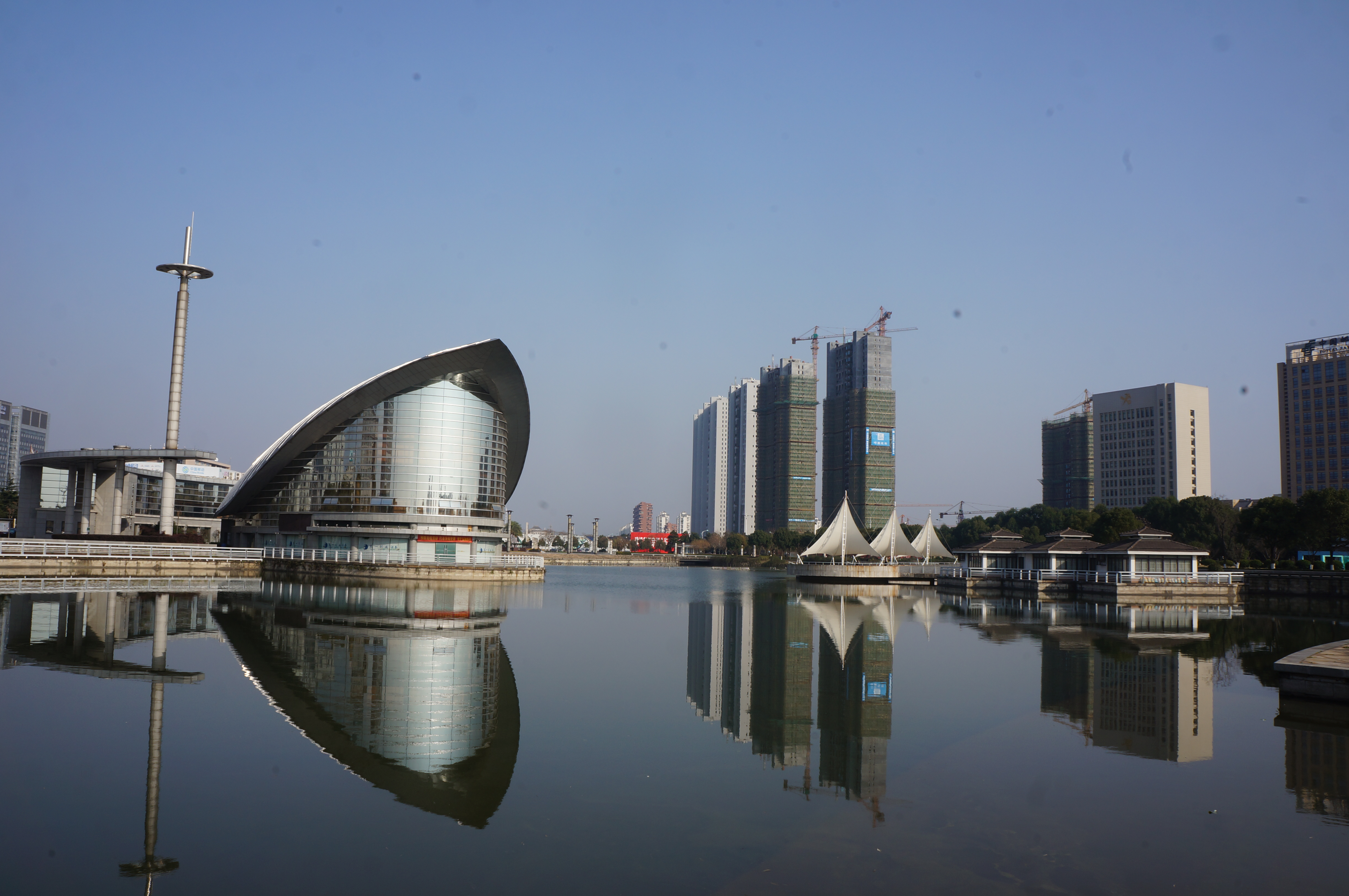

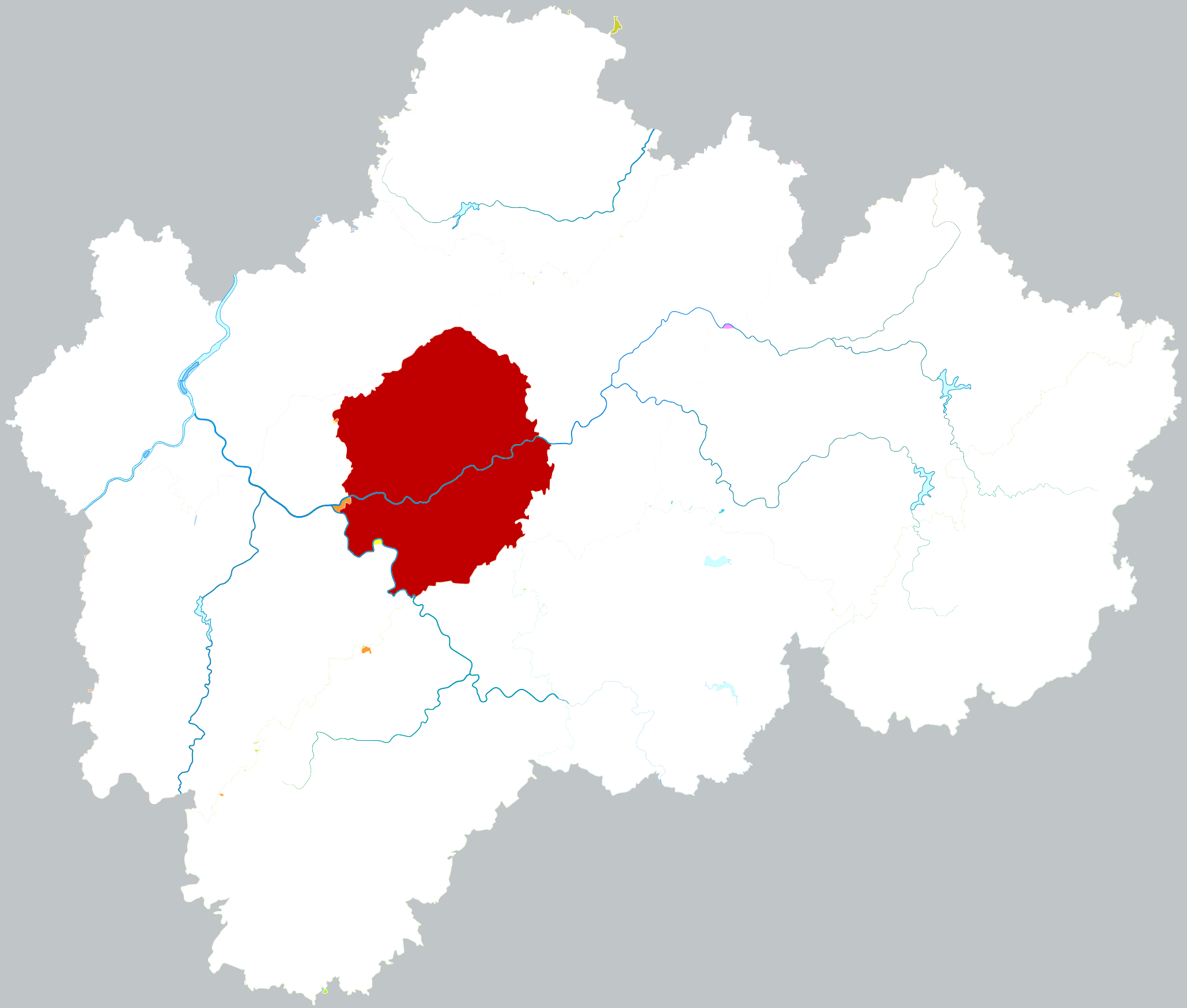
- Location of Jindong District within Jinhua

- Location in Zhejiang
- Coordinates: 29°06′28″N 119°39′17″E
- Country: People's Republic of China
- Province: Zhejiang
- Prefecture-level city: Jinhua

Area
  - Total: 658.16 km^{2} (254.12 sq mi)

Population (2020)
  - Total: 506,935
  - Density: 770.23/km^{2} (1,994.9/sq mi)
- Time zone: UTC+8 (China Standard)

Jindong District (simplified Chinese: 金东区; traditional Chinese: 金東區; pinyin: Jīndong Qū) is an administrative district in Jinhua, Zhejiang Province of China. It has an area of 661.8 km^{2} (255.5 sq mi), and a population of 300,000.

Located in central Zhejiang Province, it borders Yiwu City to the east, Yongkang City to the south, and Wucheng District to the west.

== Administrative divisions ==
Subdistricts:

- Duohu Subdistrict (多湖街道), Dongxiao Subdistrict (东孝街道)

Towns:

- Xiaoshun (孝顺镇), Fucun (傅村镇), Caozhai (曹宅镇), Lipu (澧浦镇), Lingxia (岭下镇), Jiangdong (江东镇), Tangya (塘雅镇), Chisong (赤松镇)

The only township is Yuandong Township (源东乡)
