= Dalian Rail Transit =

Chinese railway operator

Dalian Rail Transit (DRT)

Overview
- Locale: Dalian
- Transit type: Tram; Light rail Rapid transit

Operation
- Began operation: 1909

Dalian Rail Transit
- Simplified Chinese: 大连轨道交通
- Traditional Chinese: 大連軌道交通
Transcriptions
Standard Mandarin
- Hanyu Pinyin: Dàlián Gǔidào Jiāotōng

Commonly abbreviated as
- Simplified Chinese: 大连地铁
- Traditional Chinese: 大連地鐵
Transcriptions
Standard Mandarin
- Hanyu Pinyin: Dàlián Dìtiě

Second alternative Chinese name
- Simplified Chinese: 大连快轨
- Traditional Chinese: 大連快軌
Transcriptions
Standard Mandarin
- Hanyu Pinyin: Dàlián Kuàiguǐ

Dalian Rail Transit (Chinese: 大连轨道交通; abbreviation: DRT), according to the order of construction, includes the Dalian trams, the Dalianren light rail and the Dalian Rapid Transit (Dalian Metro). The Dalian Rapid Transit system is divided into the Kuaigui (Chinese: 快轨; pinyin: Kuàiguǐ) and Ditie (Chinese: 地铁; pinyin: Dìtiě). The Kuaigui is the overground system mainly running in the suburban area, while the Ditie is the underground system operating in the urban area. Announcements of the DRT are made in Mandarin and English. As of November 1, 2015, DRT has about 170 kilometers of track.

== History ==
- November 8, 2002 – Line 3 first period: Xianglujiao to Jinshitan trial operation began.
- May 1, 2003 – Line 3: Xianglujiao to Jinshitan opened.
- September 29, 2004 – Line 3 second period: Xianglujiao to Dalian opened.
- December 18, 2006 – Line 3: Xiaoyaowan opened.
- July 7, 2008 – Line 3: Kaifaqu to Jiuli branch line trial operation began.
- December 28, 2008 – Line 3: Kaifaqu to Jiuli opened.
- May 1, 2014 – No 202: Caidaling to Lüshunxingang opened.
- April 40, 2015 – Line 2 first period: Huiyizhongxin to Jichang trial operation began.
- May 22, 2015 – Line 2: Huiyizhongxin to Jichang opened.
- October 30, 2015 – Line 1 first period: Yaojia to Fuguojie opened.

== Lines ==
Dalian Rail Transit Route
Dalian rail transit planning map
Symbol	Route number	Route name	Section	Mileage (km)	Station number	Opened time	Remarks
In operation
T1	No 201	Siergou Line	Shahekouhuochezhan – Haizhiyungongyuan	11	20	1909.9.25	^{[a]}
T2	No 202	Xinggepu / Hoshigaura Line	Xinggongjie – Xiaopingdaoqian	13	19	1911.1.17	
R3	Line 3	East Jinzhou Line	Mainline: Dalian – Kaifaqu – Jinshitan	28+21	13	2002.11.8	
R3	Line 3	East Jinzhou Line	Sub-line: Dalian – Kaifaqu – Jiuli	28+14	15	2008.7.7	
R2	No 202	South Lüshun Line	Hekou – Lüshunxingang	42	8	2014.5.1	^{[b]}
M2	Line 2	West–East Dalian Line	Haizhiyun – Dalianbeizhan	37	28	2015.4.30	
M1	Line 1	North–South Dalian Line	Hekou – Xinjichang	42	25	2015.10.30	
Under construction
R4	TBD	Jinzhou–Pulandian Line	Dalianbeizhan – Zhenxinglu	65	18	2015	
Near planned
R1	TBD	West Jinzhou Line	Yingchengzi – Shimao	14	4	2020	^{[c]}
M4	TBD	TBD	Yingchengzi – Longtoushi	27	20	2020	
M5	TBD	TBD	Hutanxinqu – Houguancun	24	18	2018	
M7	TBD	TBD	Baiheshanzhuang – Gangwanguangchang	16	17	2019	
Far planned
R6	TBD	TBD	Changxingdao – Puwanxinqu	TBD	TBD	TBD	
R7	TBD	TBD	Shihegaotiezhan – Taipingwan	TBD	TBD	TBD	
R9	TBD	TBD	Shimao – Shihegaotiezhan	TBD	TBD	TBD	
R10	TBD	North Lüshun Line	Lüshun – Yingchengzi	TBD	TBD	TBD	
M6	TBD	TBD	Xiajiahezi – Hutanxinqu	TBD	26	TBD	
M8	TBD	TBD	Xiaopingdao – Qipanmo	TBD	16	TBD	
M9	TBD	TBD	Xinjichang – TBD	TBD	TBD	TBD	
M10	TBD	TBD	TBD – TBD	TBD	TBD	TBD	
To be decided
T3	No 203	Shimenshan Line	Xinggongjie – Shoushangongyuan	12	15	TBD	^{[d]}
T4	No 204	Ganjingzi Line	Xinggongjie – Yinghuayuan	12	18	TBD	^{[d]}
M3	TBD	TBD	Fujiazhuang – Fujiazhuang	32	23	TBD	

T1 Shahekouhuochezhan – Xinggongjie – Zhenggongjie – Wuyiguangchang – Datongjie – Beijingjie – Shichangjie – Dongguanjie – Dalianhuochezhan – Shengliqiao – Minshengjie – Minzhuguangchang – Shijijie – Sanbaguangchang – Erqiguangchang – Siergou – Chunhaijie – Hualeguangchang – Haichangxincheng – Jinguangdonghaian – Haizhiyungongyuan

T2 Xinggongjie – Jinhuishangcheng – Jiefangguangchang – Gongchengjie – Hepingguangchang – Huizhanzhongxin – Xinghaiguangchang – Huawusuo – Yidaeryuan – Xinghaigongyuan – Heishijiao – Hongjishuxiangyuan – Haishidaxue – Wandaguangchang – Gaoxinyuanqu – Zhongguohualu – Qixianling – Hekou – Xiaopingdaoqian

R1 ●(M1) Jichangxinqu – Jinbohaiandikuaier – Jinzhouxi – Shimao (● means the metro interchange station.)

R2 ●(M1, M8) Hekou – Caidaling – Huangnichuan – Longwangtang – Tahewan – ●(R10) Lüshun – Tieshan – Lüshunxingang (Hekou means the metro station out of operation.)

R3 ●(M5, M6) Dalian – Xianglujiao – ●(M4) Jinjiajie – Quanshui – ●(R4, M5) Houyan – Dalianwan – Kuaiguicheliangduan – ●(M9) Jinmalu – ●(R3)Kaifaqu – ···

- ··· – Baoshuiqu – Gaochengshan – Shuangdigang – Xiaoyaowan – Huanghaidadao – Jinshitan
- ··· – Tongshitai – Hongweilanshan – Dongshanlu – Hepinglu – Shijiuju – ●(R4) Jiuli

R4 ●(M1, M2) Dalianbeizhan – ●(R3, M5) Houyan – ●(M9) Taocicheng – Jinzhou – Bayilu – Shijiuju – ●(R3) Jiuli – Shisanli – ●(M10)Ershilipu – Sanshilipu – Shihegaotiezhan – Haiyangdaxue – Beihai – Changdianpu – Guafuqiao – Gongjiaozongzhan – Sanshisizhong – Zhenxinglu

M1 ●(M9) Xinjichang – ●(R1) Jichangxinqu – ●(M5) Houguancun – Yaojia – ●(R4, M2) Dalianbeizhan – Huabeilu – Huananbei – Huananguangchang – Qianshanlu – ●(M4) Songjianglu – Dongweilu – Chunliu – Xianggongjie – Zhongchangjie – ●(M6) Xinggongjie – ●(M2) Xi'anlu – Fuguojie – ●(M7) Huizhanzhongxin – Xinghaiguangchang – Xinghaigongyuan – Heishijiao – Xueyuanguangchang – Lingshui – Qixianling – ●(R2, M8) Hekou

M2 Haizhiyun – Donghai – Donggang – Huiyizhongxin – ●(M7)Gangwanguangchang – ●(M6) Zhongshanguangchang – Youhaoguangchang – Qingniwaqiao – Yierjiujie – Renminguangchang – Lianhelu – ●(M1) Xi'anlu – Jiaotongdaxue – Liaoshi – Malanguangchang – Wanjia – Hongqixilu – ●(M6) Hongjinlu – Hongganglu – Jichang – ●(M4) Xinzhaizi – Qiange – Zhongge – Gezhenpu – Houge – Weishengzhongxin – ●(M8) Tiyuzhongxin – Nanguanling – ●(R4, M1) Dalianbeizhan

M4 ●(R1, R10) Yingchengzi – Xinfucun – Qianmu – Muchengyishuiku – ●(M6) Zhoujiagou – Xinyijie – Xinpingjie – ●(M2) Xinzhaizi – Gongyedaxue – Zelonghu – Xindajie – ●(M8) Xibeilu – ●(M1) Songjianglu – Huadonglu – ●(R3) Jinjiajie – Dongfanglu – ●(M5) Suoyuwan – Dashihua – Huangshanpaotai – Longtoushi

M5 ●(M6) Hutanxinqu – Laohutan – Jingshanjie – Taoyuan – Shikuilu – ●(M7) Laodonggongyuan – Youhaojie – ●(R3, M6) Dalian – Suoyuwannan – ●(M4) Suoyuwan – Ganjingzi – Ganbeilu – Shanhuajie – Zhonghualu – Quanshuidong – Qianyan – ●(R3, R4) Houyan – ●(M1) Houguancun

M6 ●(R1) Xiajiahezi – Xinbojie – ●(M4) Zhoujiagou – Shengtaikejicheng – Xinshuilu – Yinjiatun – Zhangqianlu – Quzhengfu – ●(M2) Hongjinlu – Jinxiu – ●(M8) Jinjianglu – Xinshenglu – Lüboqiao – Changxingjie – ●(M1) Xinggongjie – Zhengongjie – Datongjie – Shichangjie – ●(R3, M5) Dalian – Shengliqiao – ●(M2) Zhongshanguangchang – ●(M7) Sanbaguangchang – Shikuilu – Yinbinlu – Laohutan – ●(M5) Hutanxinqu

M7 Baiheshanzhuang – ●(M8) Xuezijie – Ligongdaxue – Wencuijie – Shumaguangchang – Gaojiacun – Xinanlu – Nanshajie – ●(M1) Huizhanzhongxin – Chengrenjie – Jianzhushejiyuan – Changchunlu – Maotianlu – ●(M5) Laodonggongyuan – Ertonggongyuan – ●(M6) Sanbaguangchang – ●(M2)Gangwanguangchang

M8 Xiaopingdao – ●(R2, M1) Hekou – Qixianling – ●(M7) Xuezijie – Miaolingcun – Lingshuikeyun – Honglingqiao – Fuminlu – ●(M6) Jinjianglu – Yingkeguangchang – ●(M4) Xibeilu – Paoaibei – Heziqiao – ●(M2) Tiyuxincheng – Qipanmonan – Qipanmo

T3 Xinggongjie – Zhongchangxisijie – Xinjianxijie – Fangcaoyuan – Lüboqiao – Xinshenglu – Jinjiangyuan – Jinshilu – Jinxiuxiaoqu – Meishuriji – Huanlexueshijie – Sandingchuntian – Shengshiyuannongzhuang – Xinrongjie – Shoushangongyuan

T4 Xinggongjie – Shahekou – Xianggongjie – Chejiacun – Chunliu – Liujiaqiao – Zhoushuiqian – Zhoushuizi – Dongweilu – Wangjiaqiao – Zhoujiajie – Jinsanjiaoshichang – Jinjiajie – Jinjiajiekuaiguizhan – Jiaojianjie – Jiaofangjie – Ganjingzigongyuan – Yinghuayuan

M3 Fujiazhuang – Zhongxialu – Bayilu – ●(M5) Shikuilu – Shifengjie – Baiyunshan – ●(M2)Renminguangchang – Anshanlu – Haidaguangchang – Chunguangjie – Yidashijicheng – ●(M4) Huadonglu – ●(M1) Dongweilu – ●(M8) Yingkeguangchang – Liujiaqiao – ●(M6) Lüboqiao – Xinjianxiaoxue – Heqingjie – ●(M7) Xinanlu – Sunjiagou – Huawusuo – Xinghaixintiandi – Senlindongwuyuan – Fujiazhuang

Common suffixes of Chinese place names
Chinese suffix	Meaning	Chinese suffix	Meaning	Chinese suffix	Meaning
-jie	street	-guangchang	square	-zhan	station
-qiao	bridge	-gou	gully	-shangcheng	mall
-zhongxin	center	-suo	place	-gongyuan	park
-jiao	reef	-daxue	university	-qu	area, zone
-ling	hill	-wan	bay	-shan	mountain
-gang	port	-shui	river	-lu	road
-tan	beach	-li	Chinese mile	-jia	family
-zi	final particle	-pu	town	-tun	village

== Fares ==
The starting price of tram, light rail and kuaigui in Dalian is 1 yuan; the starting price of ditie in Dalian is 2 yuan, start mileage is of 6 kilometers (including 6 km), promotion mileage is of "6, 6, 8, 8, 10, 10". At the same time, before April 1, 2016, the subway passengers who take line 1 and line 2 with Pearl card will enjoy the discount of 20%.

Section	Fares (yuan)	Pearl card (yuan)
Section 1 (00 – 06 km)	2.00	1.60
Section 2 (07 – 12 km)	3.00	2.40
Section 3 (13 – 18 km)	4.00	3.20
Section 4 (19 – 26 km)	5.00	4.00
Section 5 (27 – 34 km)	6.00	4.80
Section 6 (35 – 44 km)	7.00	5.60
Section 7 (45 – 54 km)	8.00	6.40

Tram / Light rail
The Dalianhuochezhan is the section point of Tram #201's, the whole is 2 yuan, 1 yuan per segment (Pearl card: the whole is 1.3 yuan, each 0.9 yuan); Tram #202, the whole is 1 yuan (Pearl card: the whole is 0.95 yuan).

Metro
Line R3 is from 1 yuan to 8 yuan; Line R2 (Metro #202) is from 2 yuan to 7 yuan (Pearl card is no use at this period for Line R2); Line M1 and Line M2 are from 2 yuan to 6 yuan.

== Rolling stock ==
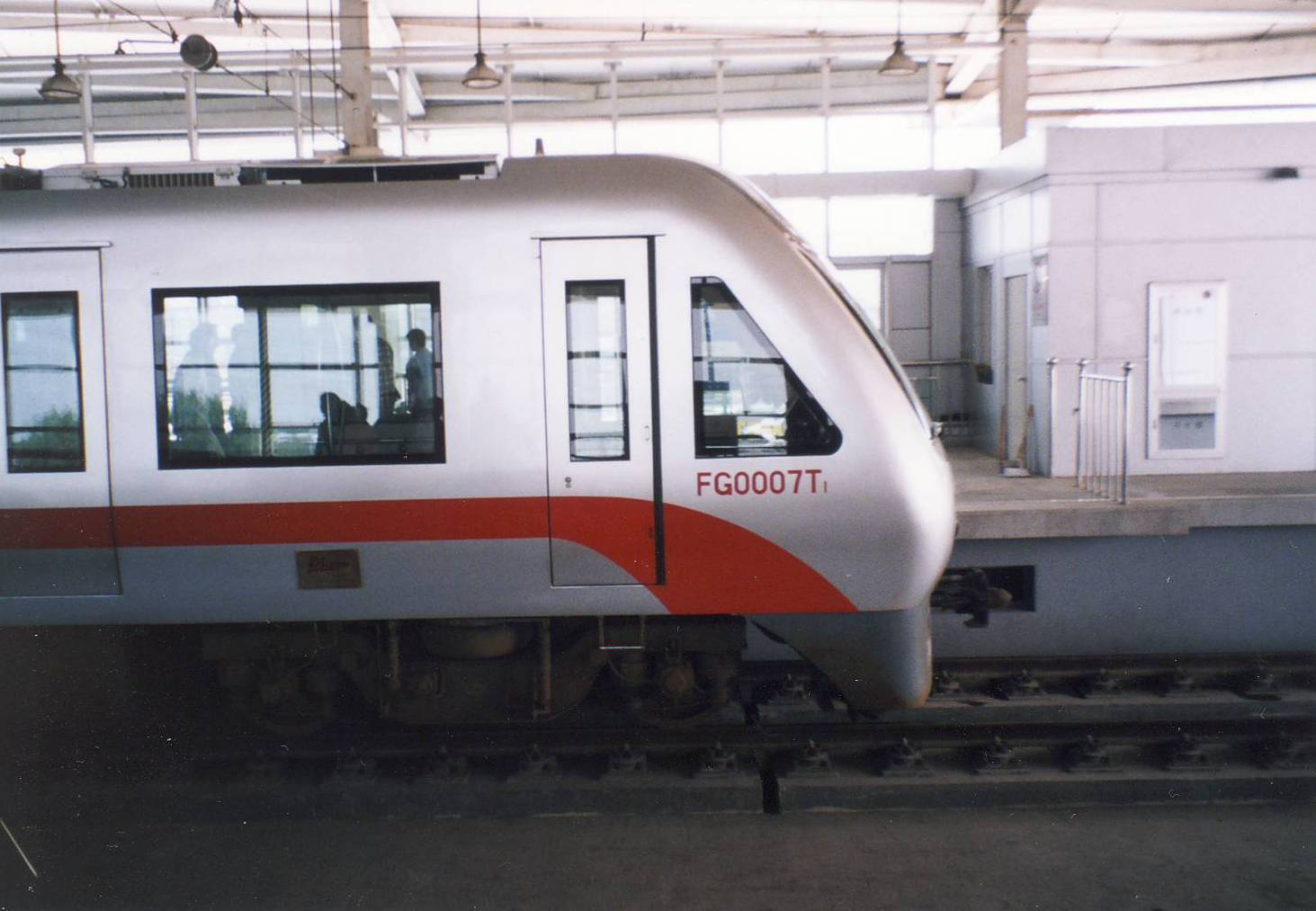
DLoco FG type

- DLoco FG type Rapid transit
  - Made in Dalian Locomotive and rolling stock Co., LTD. CNR GROUP (DLoco).
  - Body length is 19 meters, body width is 2.8 meters.
  - The maximum speed is 100 kilometers per hour, the average speed is 60 kilometers per hour.

== See also ==
- Dalian Tram
- Dalian Metro
- List of metro systems
- Metro systems by annual passenger rides

== Notes ==
a. Closed between Shahekouhuochezhan and Xinggongjie

b. Building between Hekou and Caidaling

c. Between Jichangxinqu and Shimao is the first phase of the project; R1, R7, R9, R10 connect to each other, the total length is about 180 km.

d. Double-decker tram
