= Jinjia Street station =

Metro station in Dalian, China

Jinjia Street 金家街 METRO
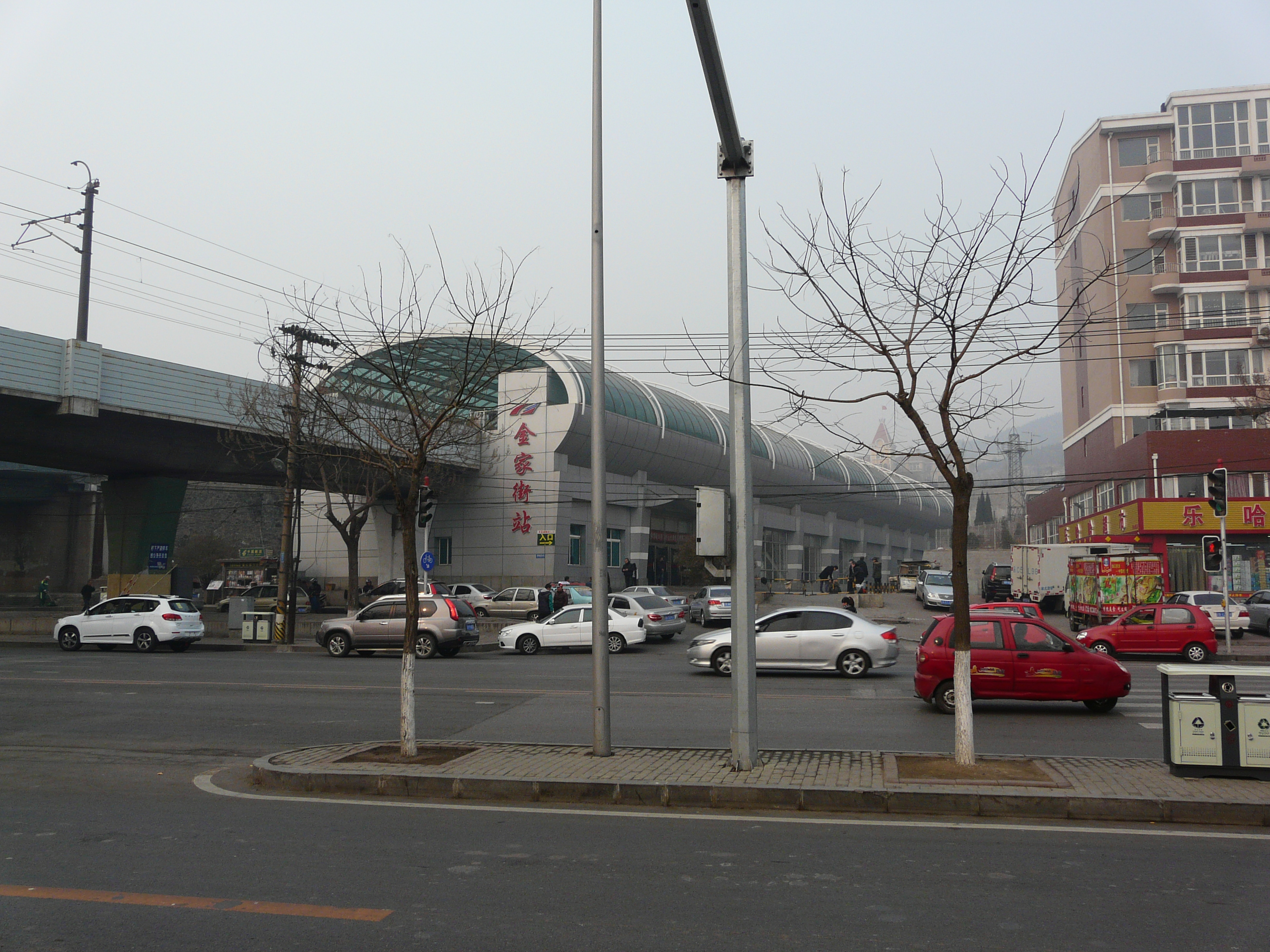

General information
- Location: Dalian, Liaoning; China
- Coordinates: 38°58′04″N 121°36′07″E
- Operated by: Dalian Public Transportation Group Co. Ltd.
- Line: Line 3

Services
Preceding station	Dalian Metro	Following station
Xianglujiao towards Dalian Railway Station	Line 3	Quanshui towards Golden Pebble Beach
Xianglujiao towards Dalian Railway Station	Line 3	Quanshui towards Jiuli
Location

Jinjia Street is a station on Line 3 of the Dalian Metro in Liaoning Province, China. It is located in the Ganjingzi District of Dalian City.
