= Dongshan Road station =

Metro station in Dalian, China

Coordinates: 39°05′30″N 121°44′17″E

Dongshan Road 东山路 METRO
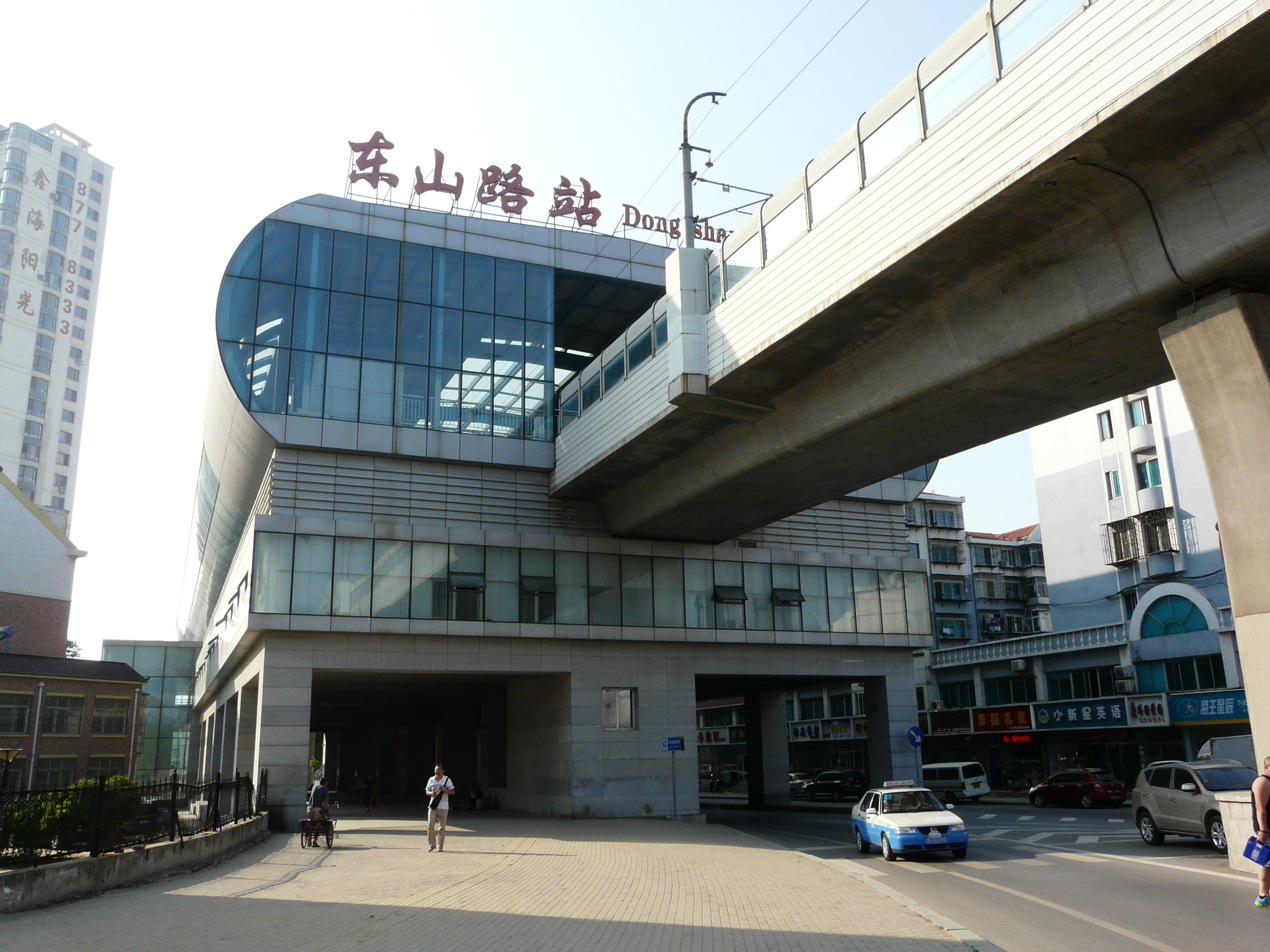

General information
- Location: Dalian, Liaoning; China
- Operated by: Dalian Public Transportation Group Co. Ltd.
- Line: Line 3

Services
Preceding station	Dalian Metro	Following station
Phoenix Peak towards Dalian Railway Station	Line 3	Heping Road towards Jiuli
Location

Dongshan Road is a station on Line 3 of the Dalian Metro in Liaoning Province, China. It is located in the Jinzhou District of Dalian City.
