= Jinma Road station =

Metro station in Dalian, China

Coordinates: 39°02′56″N 121°44′33″E

Jinma Road 金马路 METRO
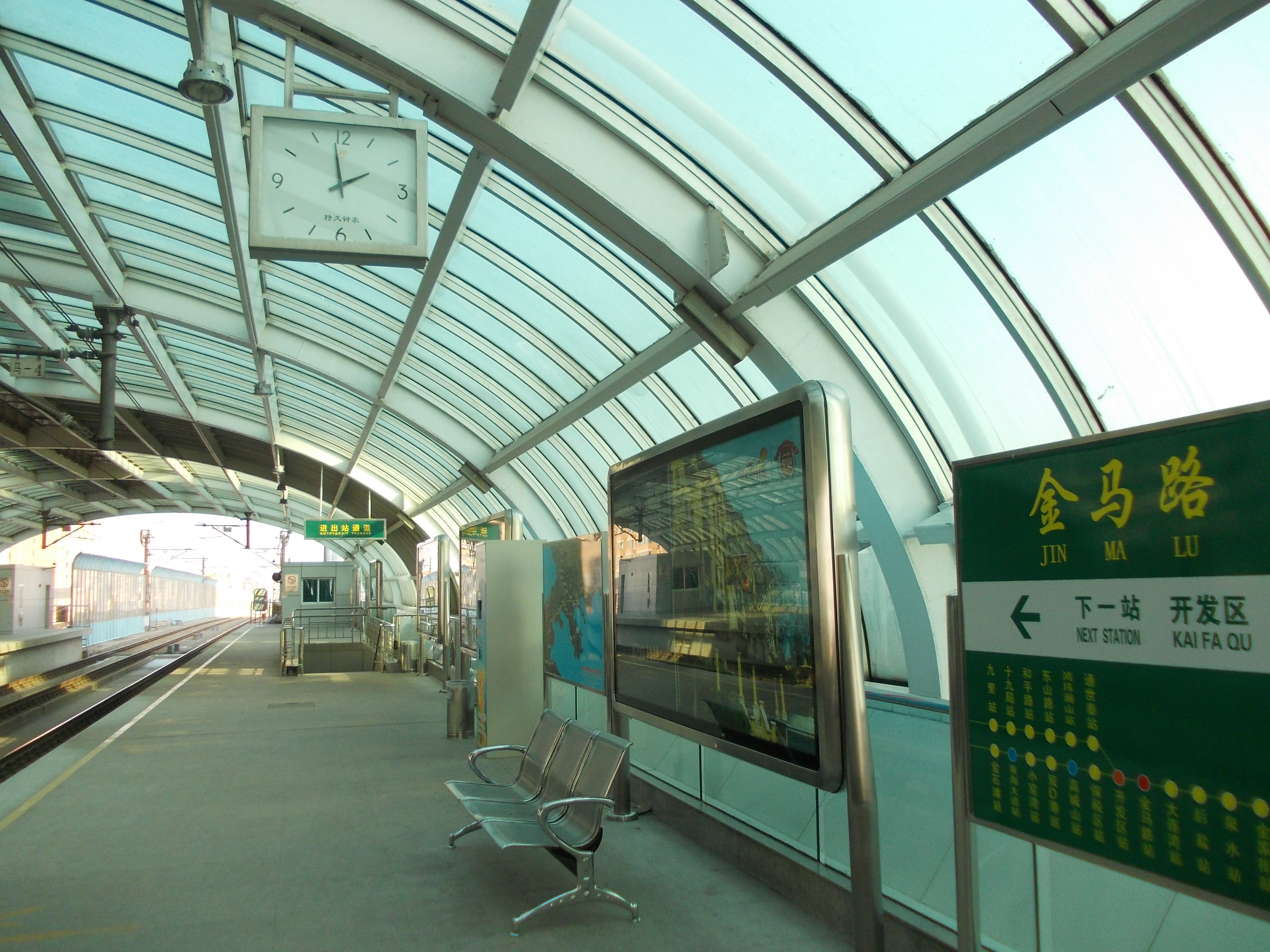

General information
- Location: Dalian, Liaoning; China
- Operated by: Dalian Public Transportation Group Co. Ltd.
- Line: Line 3

Services
| Preceding station | Dalian Metro | Following station |
|---|---|---|
| Dalianwan towards Dalian Railway Station | Line 3 | Dalian Development Area towards Golden Pebble Beach |
| Dalianwan towards Dalian Railway Station | Line 3 | Dalian Development Area towards Jiuli |
Location

Jinma Road is a station on Line 3 of the Dalian Metro in Liaoning Province, China. It is located in the Jinzhou District of Dalian City.
