= DD Port station =

Station of the Dalian metro

DD Port 双D港
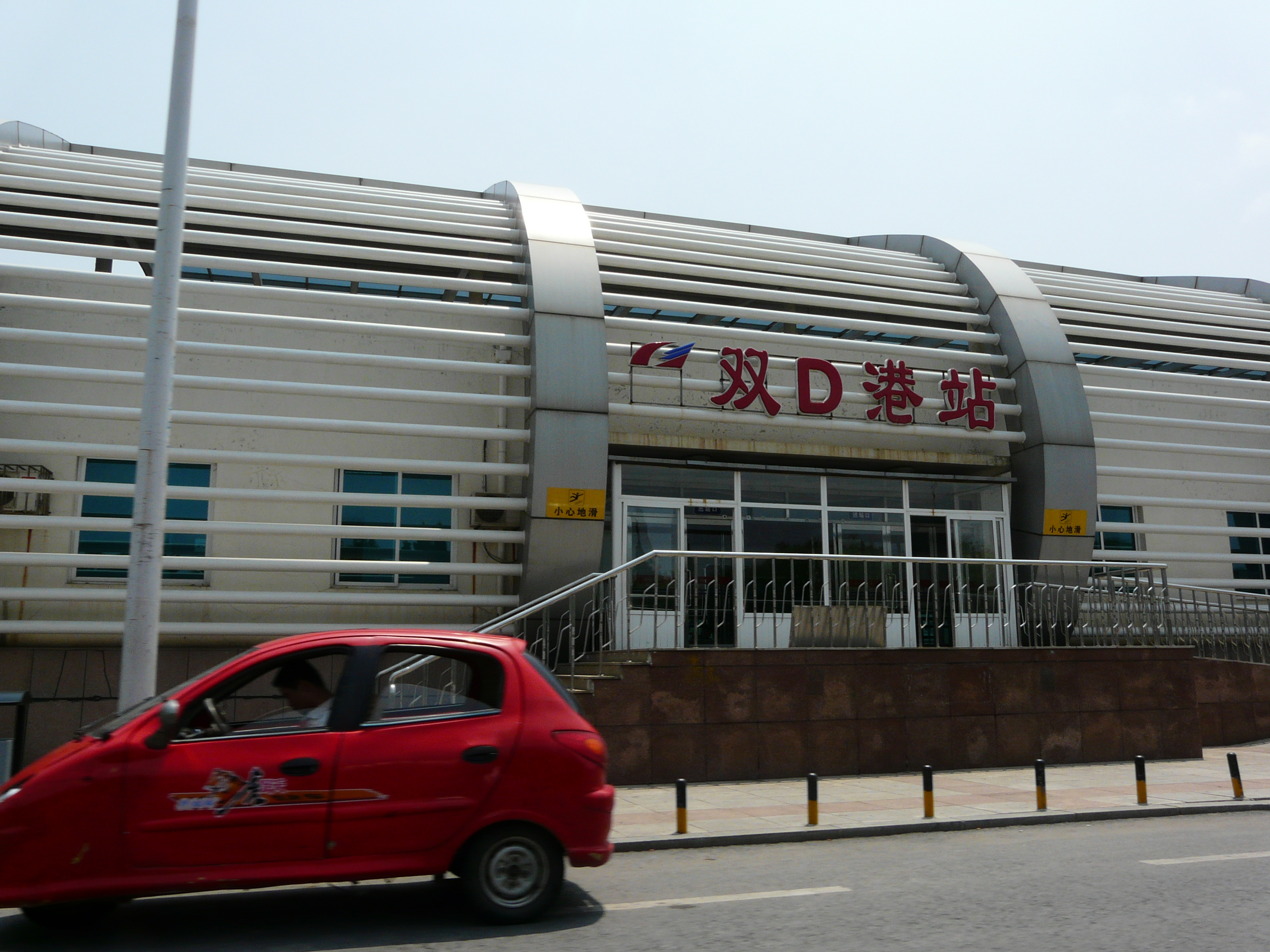

General information
- Location: Dalian, Liaoning; China
- Coordinates: 39°03′41″N 121°52′06″E
- Operated by: Dalian Public Transportation Group Co. Ltd.
- Line: Line 3

Services
Preceding station	Dalian Metro	Following station
Free Trade Zone towards Dalian Railway Station	Line 3	Xiaoyaowan towards Golden Pebble Beach
Location

DD Port is a station on Line 3 of the Dalian Metro in Liaoning Province, China. It is located in the Jinzhou District of Dalian City. The station is named after an industrial park based on Digital and DNA technology.
