= Tostem station =

Metro station in Dalian, China

Coordinates: 39°04′06″N 121°46′01″E

Tostem 通世泰 METRO

General information
- Location: Dalian, Liaoning; China
- Operated by: Dalian Public Transportation Group Co. Ltd.
- Line: Line 3

Services
Preceding station	Dalian Metro	Following station
Dalian Development Area towards Dalian Railway Station	Line 3	Phoenix Peak towards Jiuli
Location

Tostem is a station on Line 3 of the Dalian Metro in Liaoning Province, China. It is located in the Jinzhou District of Dalian City.
