= Phoenix Peak station =

Metro station in Dalian, China

Coordinates: 39°04′54″N 121°45′06″E

Phoenix Peak 鸿玮澜山

General information
- Location: Dalian, Liaoning; China
- Operated by: Dalian Public Transportation Group Co. Ltd.
- Line: Line 3

Services
Preceding station	Dalian Metro	Following station
Tostem towards Dalian Railway Station	Line 3	Dongshan Road towards Jiuli
Location

Phoenix Peak is a station on Line 3 of the Dalian Metro in Liaoning Province, China. It is located in the Jinzhou District of Dalian City.
