= Xianglujiao station =

Railway station in Liaoning Province, China

Coordinates: 38°55′42″N 121°36′11″E

Xianglujiao 香炉礁 METRO
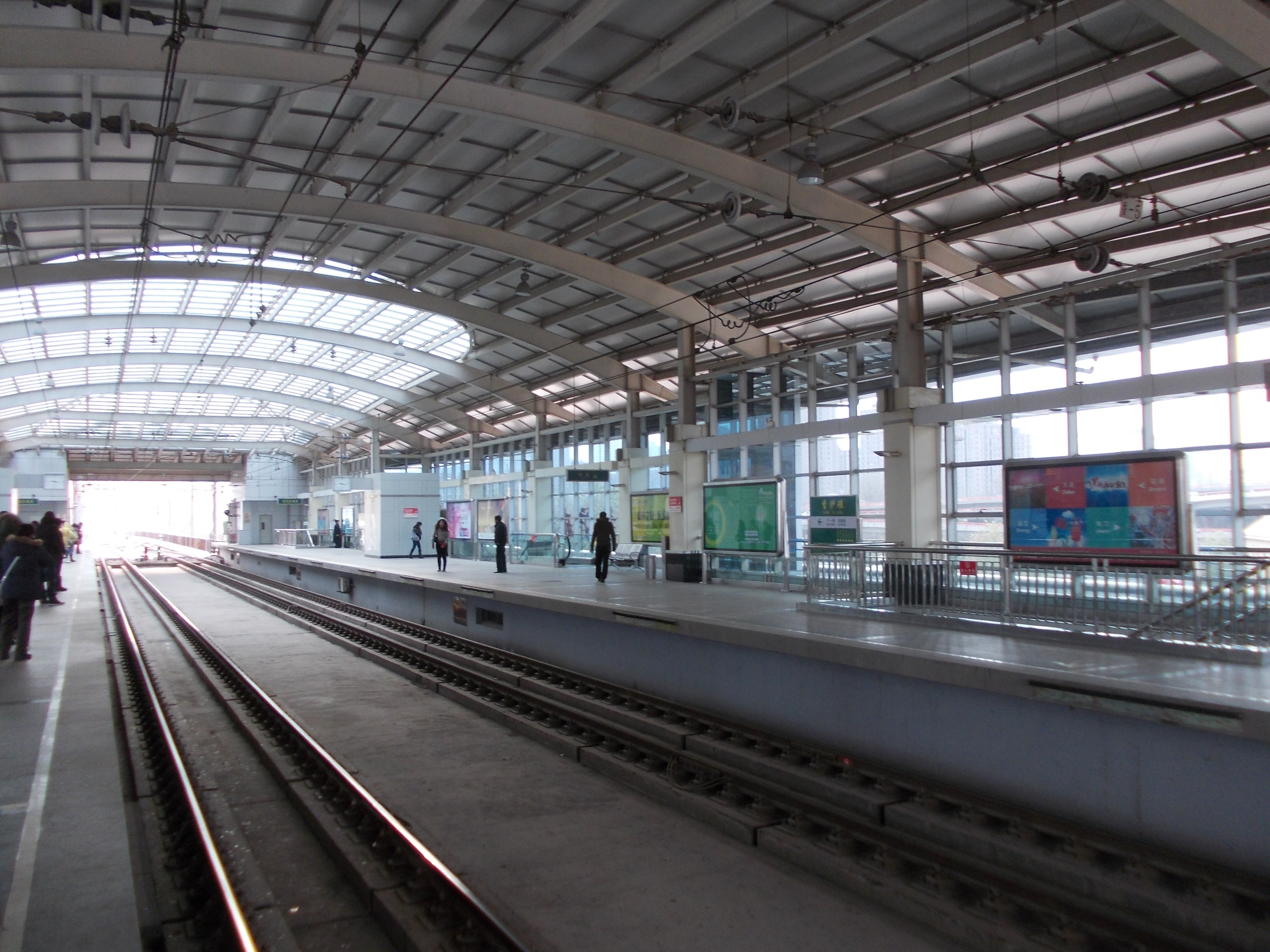
- Xianglujiao Station platform

General information
- Location: Dalian, Liaoning; China
- Operated by: Dalian Public Transportation Group Co. Ltd.
- Line: Line 3

Services
Preceding station	Dalian Metro	Following station
Dalian Railway Station towards Dalian Railway Station	Line 3	Jinjia Street towards Golden Pebble Beach
Dalian Railway Station towards Dalian Railway Station	Line 3	Jinjia Street towards Jiuli
Location

Xianglujiao (Chinese: 香炉礁; pinyin: xiānglújiāo) is a station on Line 3 of the Dalian Metro in Liaoning Province, China. It is located in the Xigang District of Dalian City.

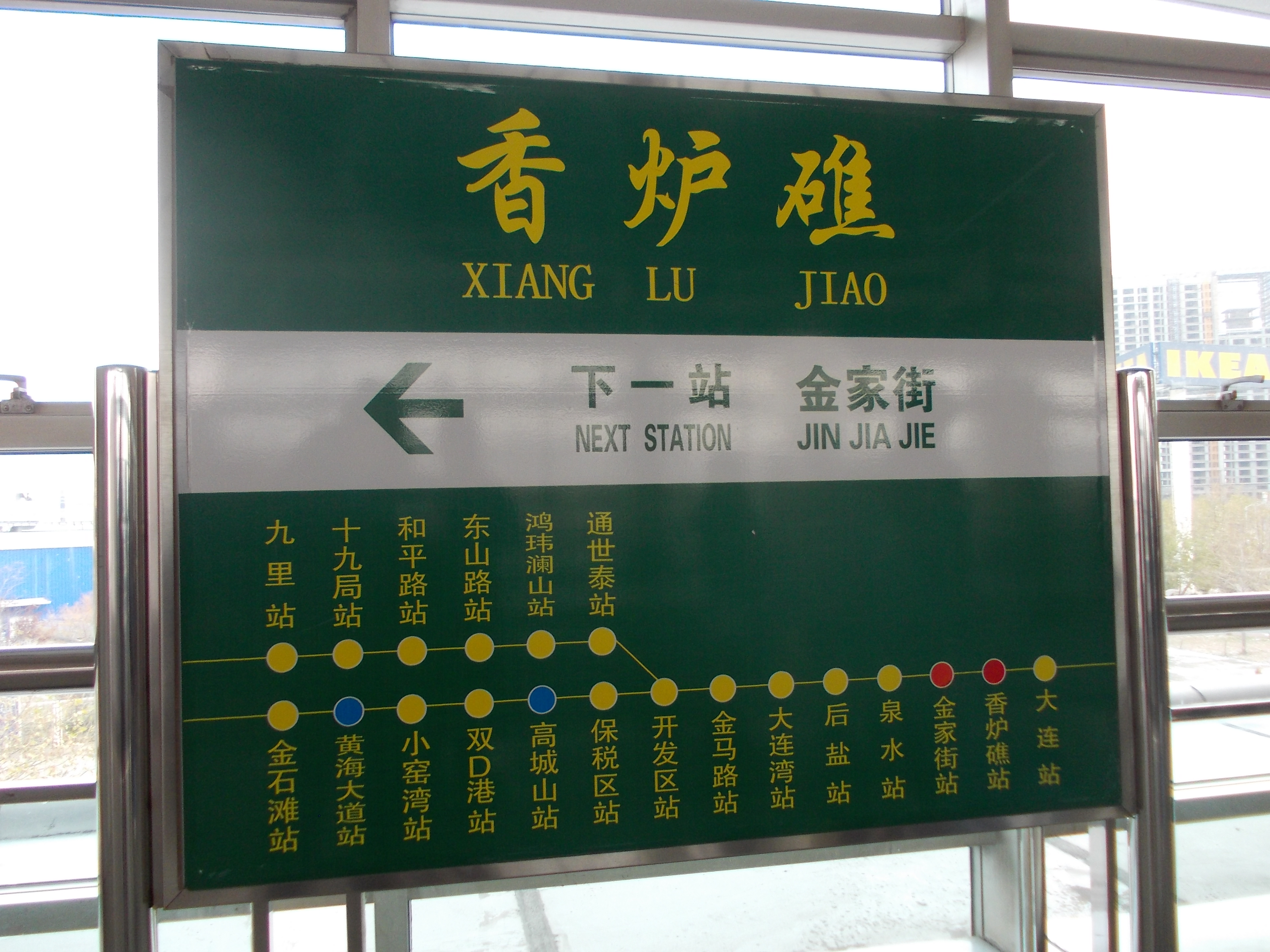
Sign at Xianglujiao Station showing the names of all stations on Lines 3 and 7

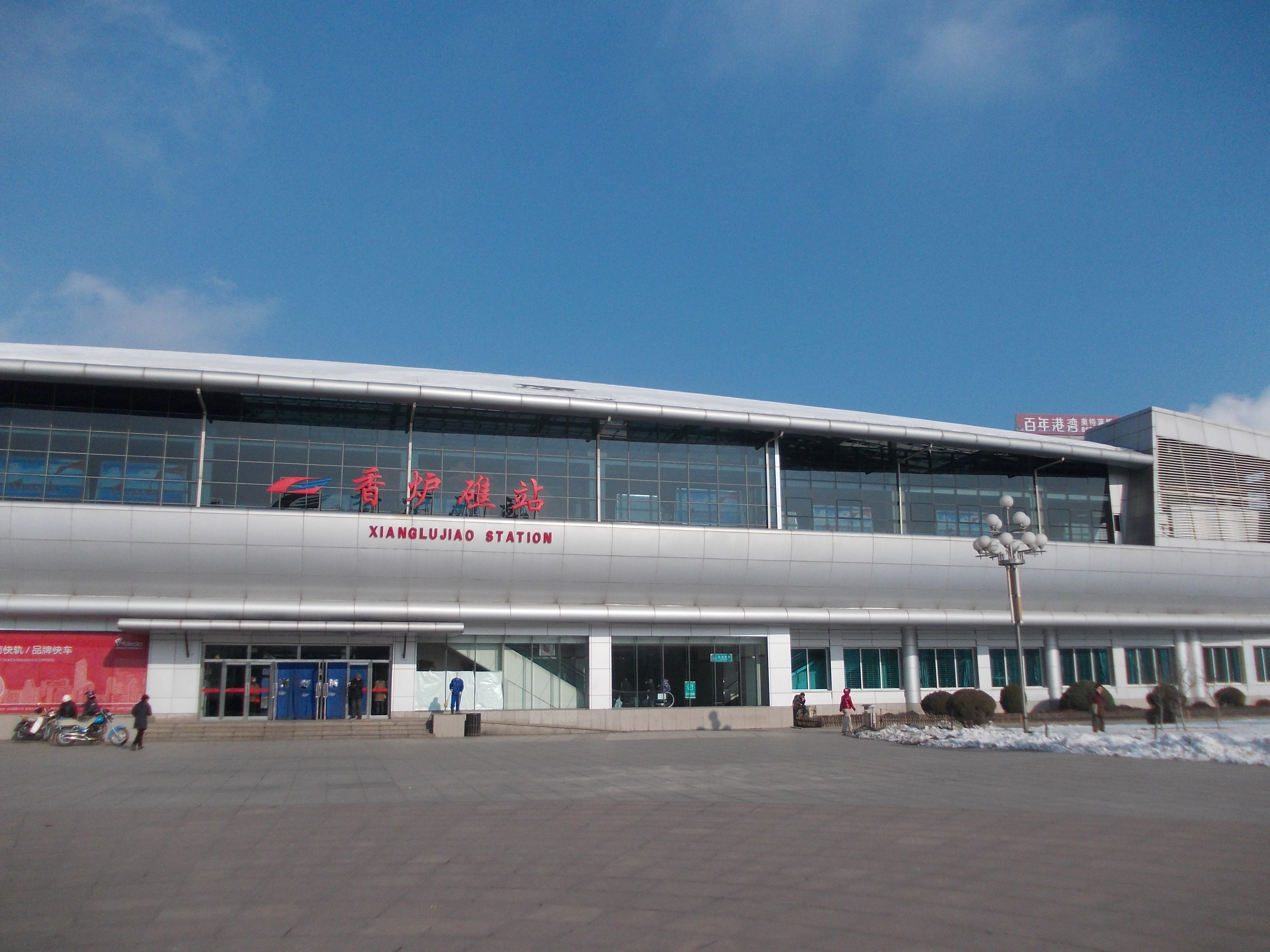
Front of the station

== Around the station ==
- Dalian Mosque
