= Dalian Development Area station =

Metro station in Dalian, China

Dalian Development Area 开发区
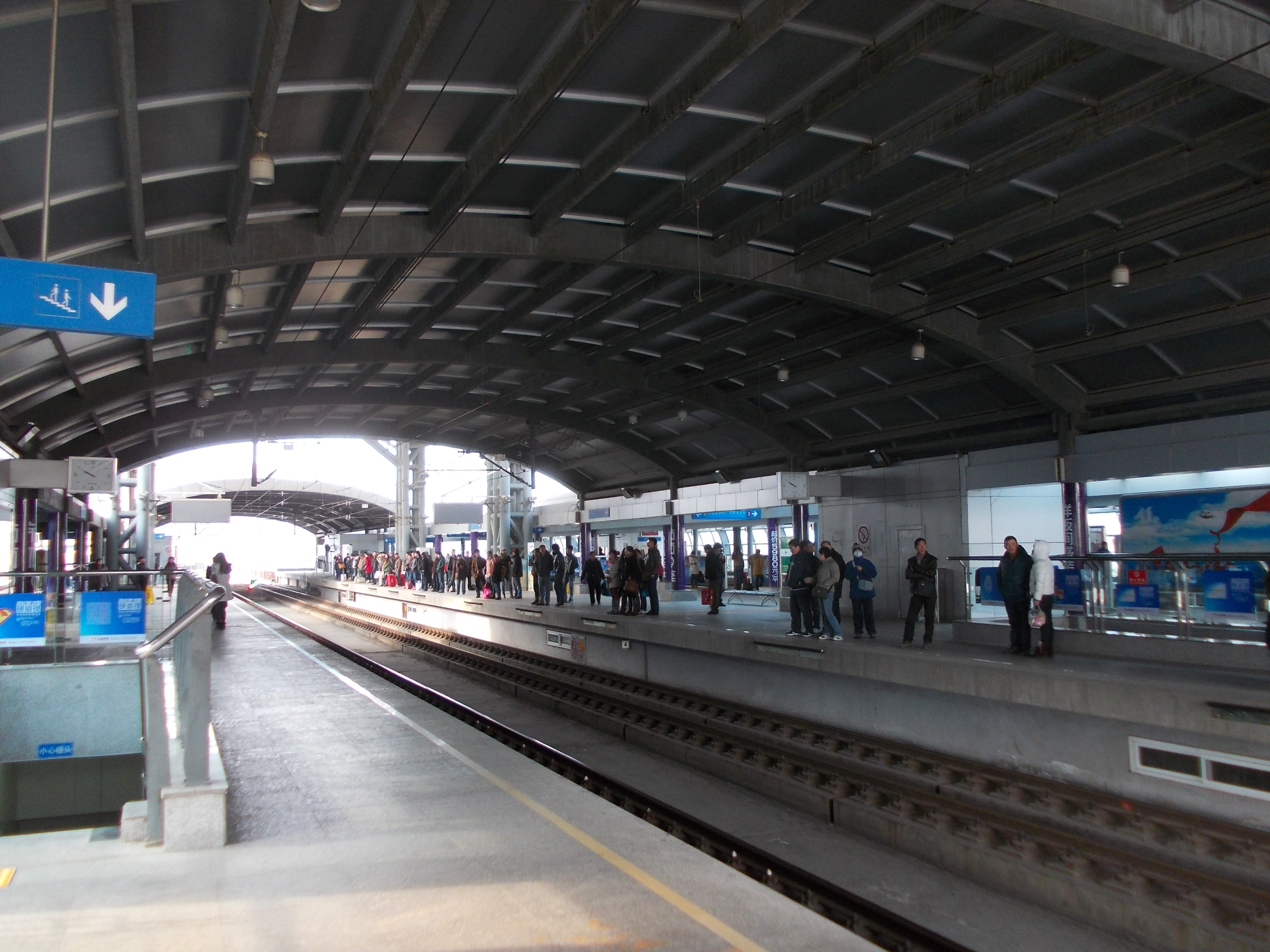
- Line 3 Platform at Kaifaqu Station

General information
- Location: Dalian, Liaoning; China
- Coordinates: 39°03′10″N 121°46′25″E
- Operated by: Dalian Public Transportation Group Co. Ltd.
- Line(s): Line 3

Construction
- Structure type: Elevated

History
- Opened: 28 December 2008

Services
Preceding station	Dalian Metro	Following station
Jinma Road towards Dalian Railway Station	Line 3	Free Trade Zone towards Golden Pebble Beach
Jinma Road towards Dalian Railway Station	Line 3	Tostem towards Jiuli
Location

Dalian Development Area is a station on Line 3 of the Dalian Metro in Liaoning Province, China. It is located in the Jinzhou District of Dalian City.
