= Jinmalu =

Jinmalu may refer to:

- Jinmalu Station (Dalian), a station on Line 3 of the Dalian Metro, Liaoning Province, China
- Jinmalu Station (Nanjing), a station on Line 2 of the Nanjing Metro, Jiangsu Province, China
