= Hepinglu station =

Hepinglu station may refer to:

- Hepinglu station (Tianjin Metro), a station on Line 3 and Line 4 of the Tianjin Metro
- Heping Road station, a station on line 3 of the Dalian Metro
