= Line 13 (Dalian Metro) =

Metro line in Dalian, China

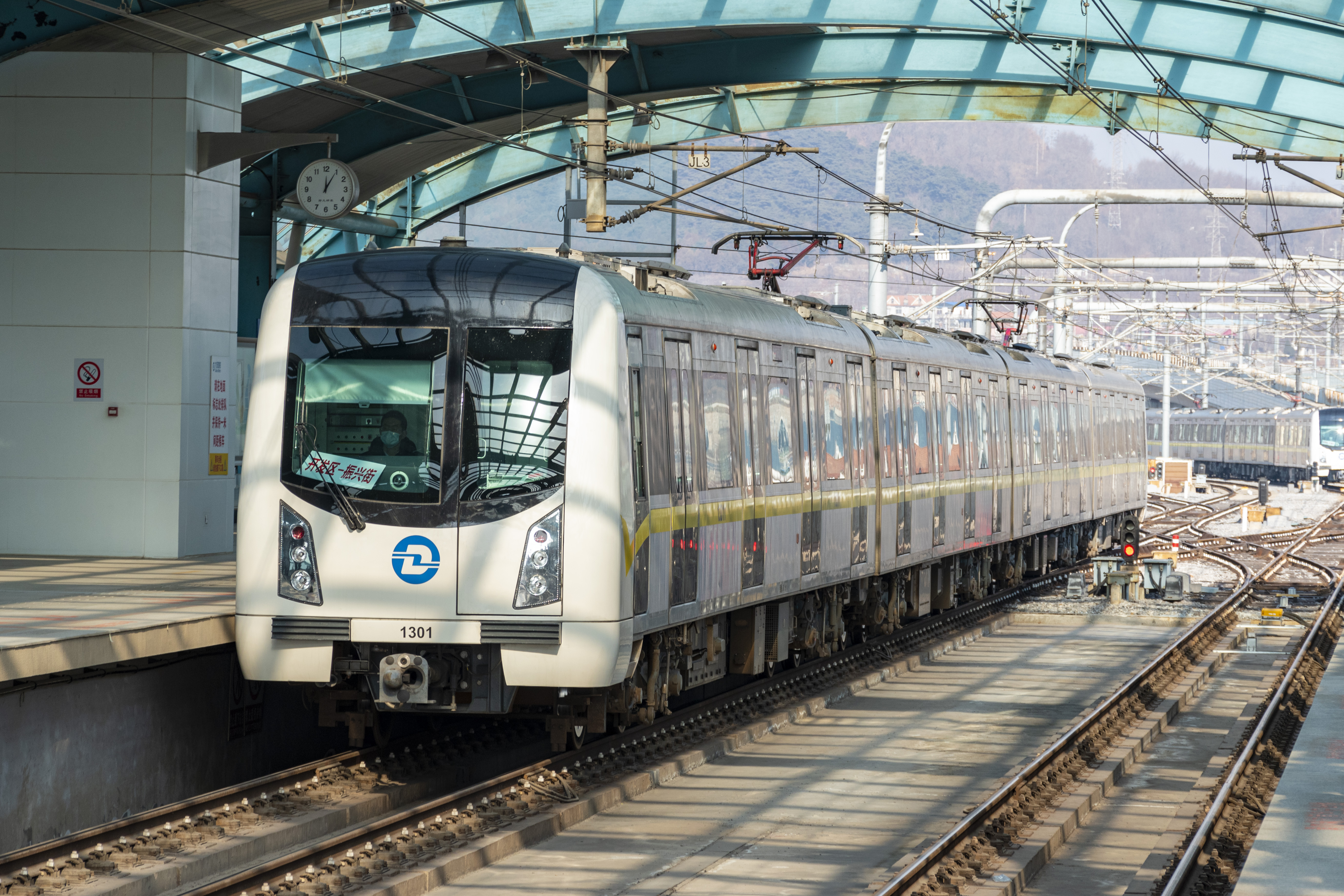
- A train of Dalian Metro Line 13

Overview
- Other names: R4; Jinpu Intercity Railway; Jinzhou-Pulandian Intercity Railway
- Status: Operational
- Owner: Dalian
- Locale: Dalian, Liaoning, China
- Termini: Jiuli; Pulandian Zhenxing Street
- Stations: 12

Service
- Type: Rapid transit
- System: Dalian Metro
- Services: 1
- Operator(s): Dalian Metro Group Co., Ltd.

History
- Opened: 28 December 2021; 4 years ago

Technical
- Line length: 43.152 km (26.81 mi)
- Num of tracks: 2
- Character: Elevated
- Track gauge: 1,435 mm (4 ft 8 1/2 in)
- Electrification: Overhead lines 1500 V DC

Line 13 of the Dalian Metro (R4; Chinese: 大连地铁13号线; pinyin: Dàlián Dìtiě Shisān Hào Xiàn) is a rapid transit line running mainly in northern Dalian, China. Phase 1 of Line 13 was opened on 28 December 2021. The line is 43.152 km (26.813 mi) long with 12 stations.

The line was once called Jinzhou–Pulandian intercity railway in the early plan bluebooks. At the moment Line 13 runs through trains between Pulandian Zhenxing Street and Dalian Development Area of the Line 3 branch.

== Opening timeline ==
Segment	Commencement	Length	Station(s)	Name
Jiuli — Pulandian Zhenxing Street	28 December 2021	43.152 km (26.81 mi)	12	Phase 1

== Stations ==
Station name		Connections	Distance km		Location
English	Chinese	Connections	Distance km		Location
Pulandian Zhenxing Street	普兰店振兴街		0.00	0.00	Pulandian
Ping'anhe	平安河		1.91	1.91	Pulandian
Pulandian Development Zone	普兰店开发区		1.55	3.46	Pulandian
Haiwan High School	海湾高中		1.53	4.99	Pulandian
The Third Hospital of Dalian Medical University	大医三院		1.76	6.75	Pulandian
Changdianpu	长店堡		3.55	10.31	Pulandian
Wulitai	五里台		1.91	12.21	Pulandian
Shihe Beihai	石河北海		2.03	14.24	Jinzhou
Puwan Stadium	普湾体育场		2.07	16.31	Jinzhou
Shihe Huangqi	石河黄旗		4.50	20.81	Jinzhou
Wushili	五十里		2.29	23.10	Jinzhou
Sishili	四十里		2.45	25.55	Jinzhou
Sanshilipu	三十里堡		3.45	29.00	Jinzhou
Xisanshili	西三十里		2.57	31.57	Jinzhou
Ershilipu	二十里堡		5.69	37.26	Jinzhou
Shisanli	十三里		2.78	40.04	Jinzhou
Jiuli	九里	3 (branch)	3.14	43.00	Jinzhou
↓ Through service to/from Dalian Development Area via Line 3 branch
