= Free Trade Zone station =

Metro station in Dalian, China

Free Trade Zone 保税区
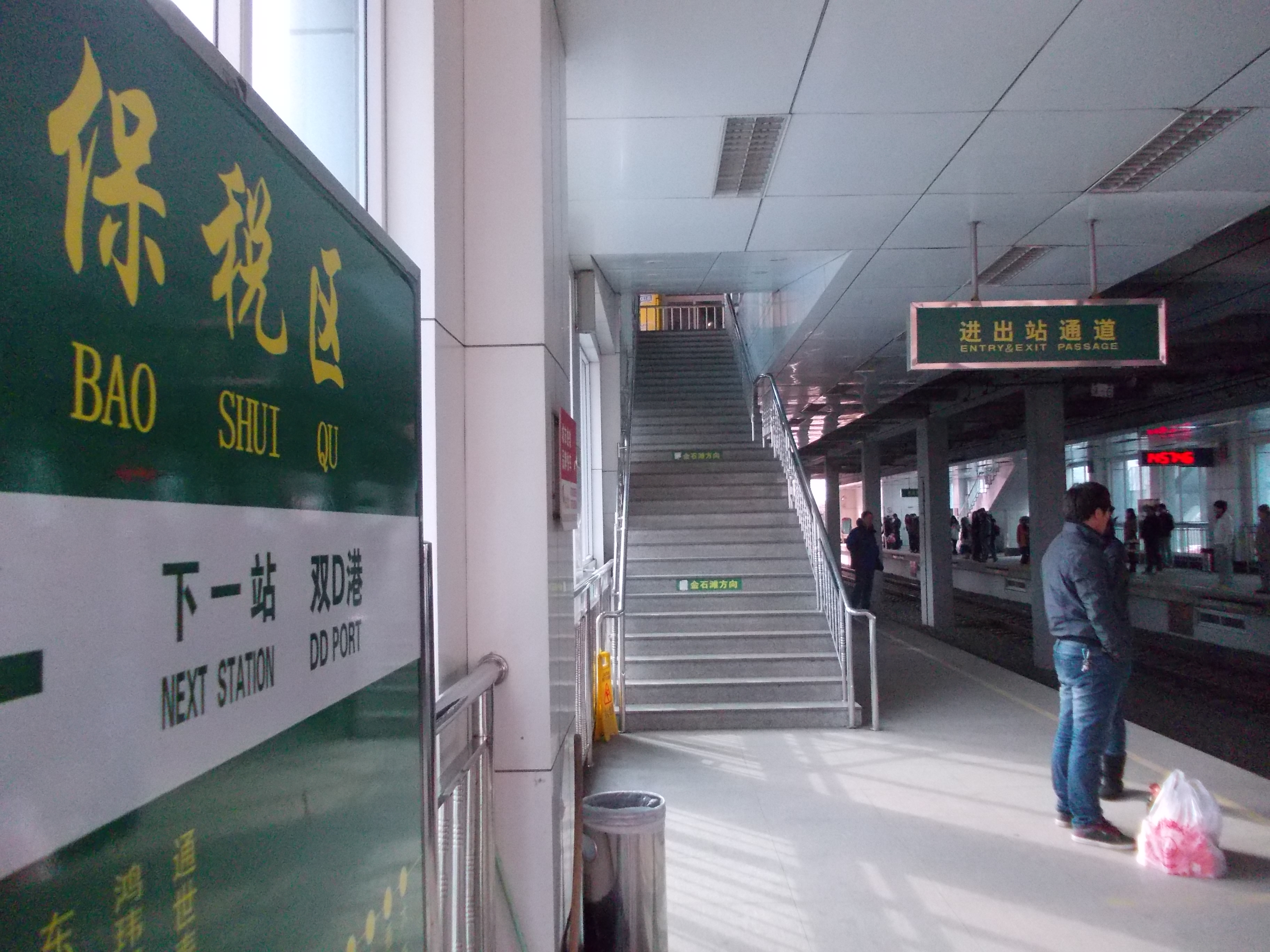

General information
- Location: Dalian, Liaoning; China
- Coordinates: 39°03′35″N 121°48′11″E
- Operated by: Dalian Public Transportation Group Co. Ltd.
- Line: Line 3

Services
Preceding station	Dalian Metro	Following station
Dalian Development Area towards Dalian Railway Station	Line 3	DD Port towards Golden Pebble Beach
Location

Free Trade Zone (Chinese: 保税区; pinyin: bǎoshuìqū) is a station on Line 3 of the Dalian Metro in Liaoning Province, China. It is located in the Jinzhou District of Dalian City.

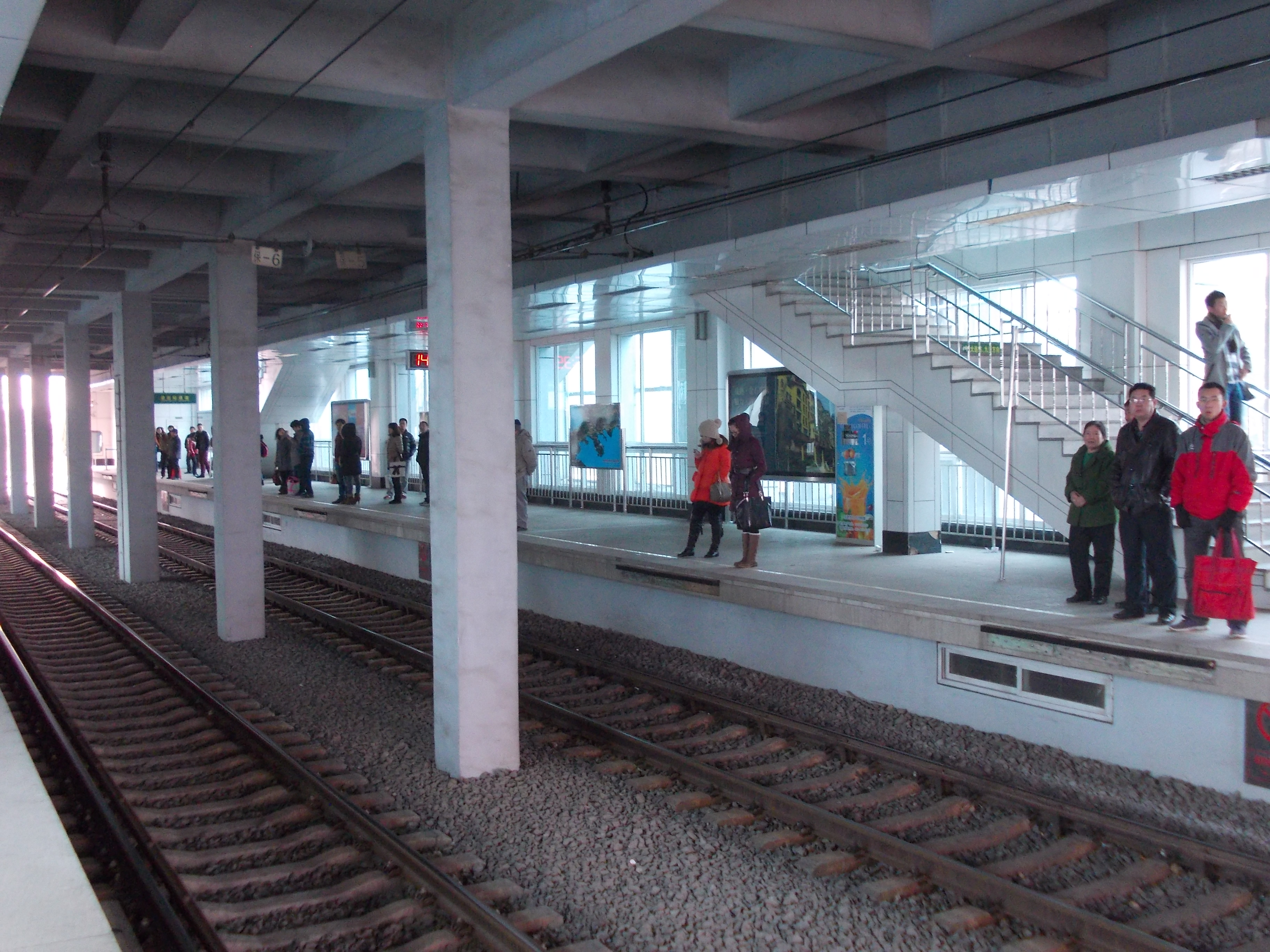
Platform
