= China Railway 19th Bureau station =

Metro station in Dalian, China

Coordinates: 39°07′38″N 121°43′49″E

China Railway 19th Bureau 十九局

General information
- Location: Dalian, Liaoning; China
- Operated by: Dalian Public Transportation Group Co. Ltd.
- Line: Line 3

Services
Preceding station	Dalian Metro	Following station
Heping Road towards Dalian Railway Station	Line 3	Jiuli Terminus
Location

China Railway 19th Bureau is a station on Line 3 of the Dalian Metro in Liaoning Province, China. It is located in the Jinzhou District of Dalian City.
