= Heping Road station =

Railway station in China

Coordinates: 39°06′26″N 121°43′31″E

Heping Road 和平路 METRO
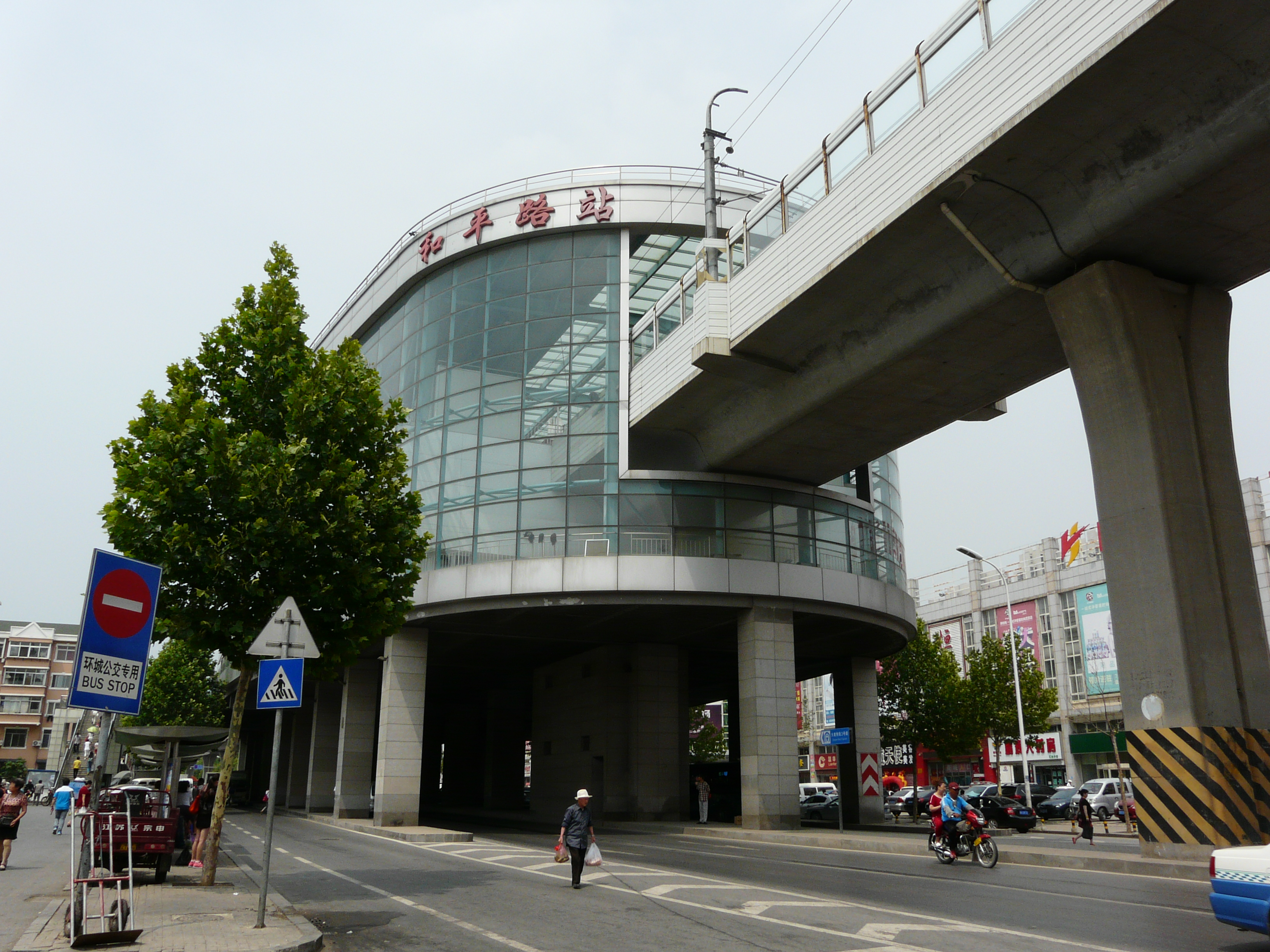

General information
- Location: Dalian, Liaoning; China
- Operated by: Dalian Public Transportation Group Co. Ltd.
- Line: Line 3

Services
Preceding station	Dalian Metro	Following station
Dongshan Road towards Dalian Railway Station	Line 3	CR 19th Bureau towards Jiuli
Location

Heping Road is a station on Line 3 of the Dalian Metro in Liaoning Province, China. It is located in the Jinzhou District of Dalian City.
