= Xiaoyaowan station =

Metro station in Dalian, China

Xiaoyaowan 小窑湾 METRO

General information
- Location: Dalian, Liaoning; China
- Coordinates: 39°04′34″N 121°53′52″E
- Operated by: Dalian Public Transportation Group Co. Ltd.
- Line: Line 3

Services
Preceding station	Dalian Metro	Following station
DD Port towards Dalian Railway Station	Line 3	Golden Pebble Beach Terminus
Location

Xiaoyaowan is a station on Line 3 of the Dalian Metro in Liaoning Province, China. It is located in the Jinzhou District of Dalian City.
