= Baoshuiqu Station =

Baoshuiqu Station may refer to:

- Baoshuiqu Station (Dalian), in the Jinzhou District, Dalian, Liaoning, China
- Baoshuiqu Station (Xi'an), in the Baqiao District, Xi'an, Shaanxi, China
