= Line 3 (Dalian Metro) =

Metro line in Dalian, China

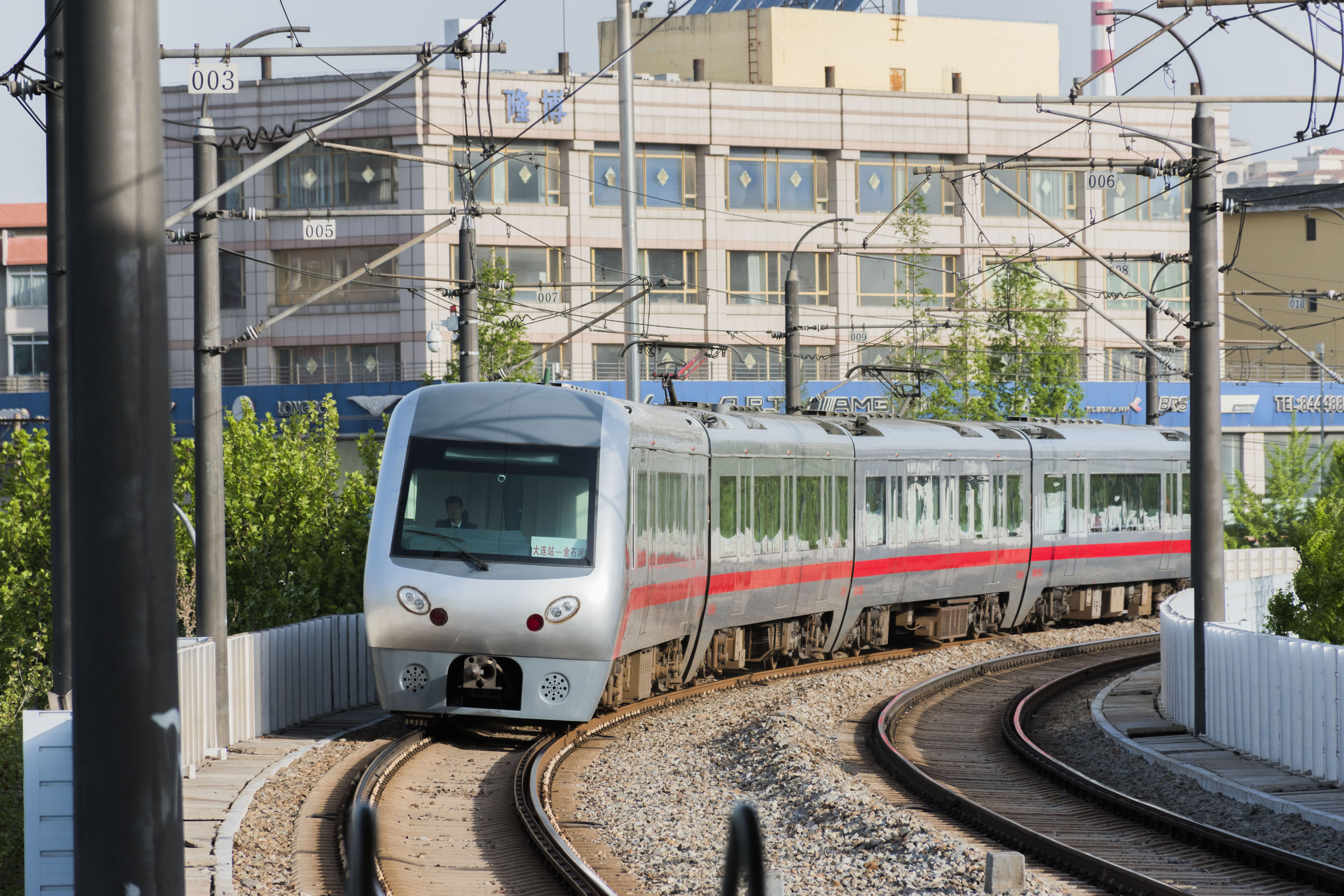
- Line 3 train approaching Xianglujiao station

Overview
- Other names: R3; Dalian–Jinzhou intercity railway (Chinese: 大连金州城际轨道交通; pinyin: Dàlián Jīnzhōu Chéngjì Guǐdào Jiāotōng)
- Status: Operational
- Owner: Dalian
- Locale: Dalian, Liaoning, China
- Termini: Dalian Railway Station; Golden Pebble Beach / Jiuli
- Stations: 18

Service
- Type: Rapid transit
- System: Dalian Metro
- Services: 2
- Operator(s): Dalian Metro Group Co., Ltd.

History
- Opened: 8 November 2002; 22 years ago

Technical
- Line length: 63.45 km (39.43 mi)
- Number of tracks: 2
- Character: Elevated
- Track gauge: 1,435 mm (4 ft 8 1/2 in)

Line 3 of the Dalian Metro (R3; Chinese: 大连地铁3号线; pinyin: Dàlián Dìtiě Sān Hào Xiàn) is a rapid transit line running from southwest to northwest Dalian. It was opened on the 8 November 2002. This line is 63.45 km (39.43 mi) long with 12 stations.

Line 3 is almost completely at grade or above ground; 13.89 kilometres (8.63 mi) is elevated, 1.123 kilometres (0.698 mi) is underground and 31.39 kilometres (19.50 mi) is at grade. Six stations are elevated, and the remainder are at grade. Transfers to trams and trains are possible at the Dalian Railway Station.

The northern area of the city, where the Economic and Technology Development Zone is located, is not well-served by buses. The metro line beginning at the downtown commercial center (near the Dalian railway station) runs through five administrative districts of the city and serves as an express transport between the northern (developing) region and the downtown area. The line extends northward to Golden Pebble Beach (Jinshitan Scenic Area), a national scenic park 50 km (31 mi) from the city center. The Jiuli branch route was opened on 28 December 2008. The branch route connects central Dalian with Jinzhou District (金州区) with fourteen stations from south to north. The branch begins at Dalian Development Area station and stretches northwest ending at Jiuli station.

All stations have side platforms. Tracks in the platform area have no ballast (gravel); however, tracks outside the station are on ballast. All stations are covered by a combination of transparent corrugated sheets and a concrete roof.

In October 2017, most station names were re-translated from Pinyin into conventional English.

Since 18 November 2021, operation schedule of the branch section has changed to only Dalian Development Area - Jiuli, branch trains no longer run through Dalian Railway station, to allow testing of trains of line 13, and through trains between line 3 branch and line 13.

== Opening timeline ==
Segment	Commencement	Length	Station(s)	Name
Dalian Railway Station — Golden Pebble Beach	8 November 2002	49.15 km (30.54 mi)	12	Phases 1 & 2
Dalian Development Area — Jiuli	28 December 2008	14.3 km (8.89 mi)	6	Jiuli branch extension

== Service routes ==
- Dalian Railway Station — Golden Pebble Beach
- Dalian Railway Station — Free Trade Zone
- Dalian Development Area — Pulandian Zhenxing Street ( 13 )

== Stations ==
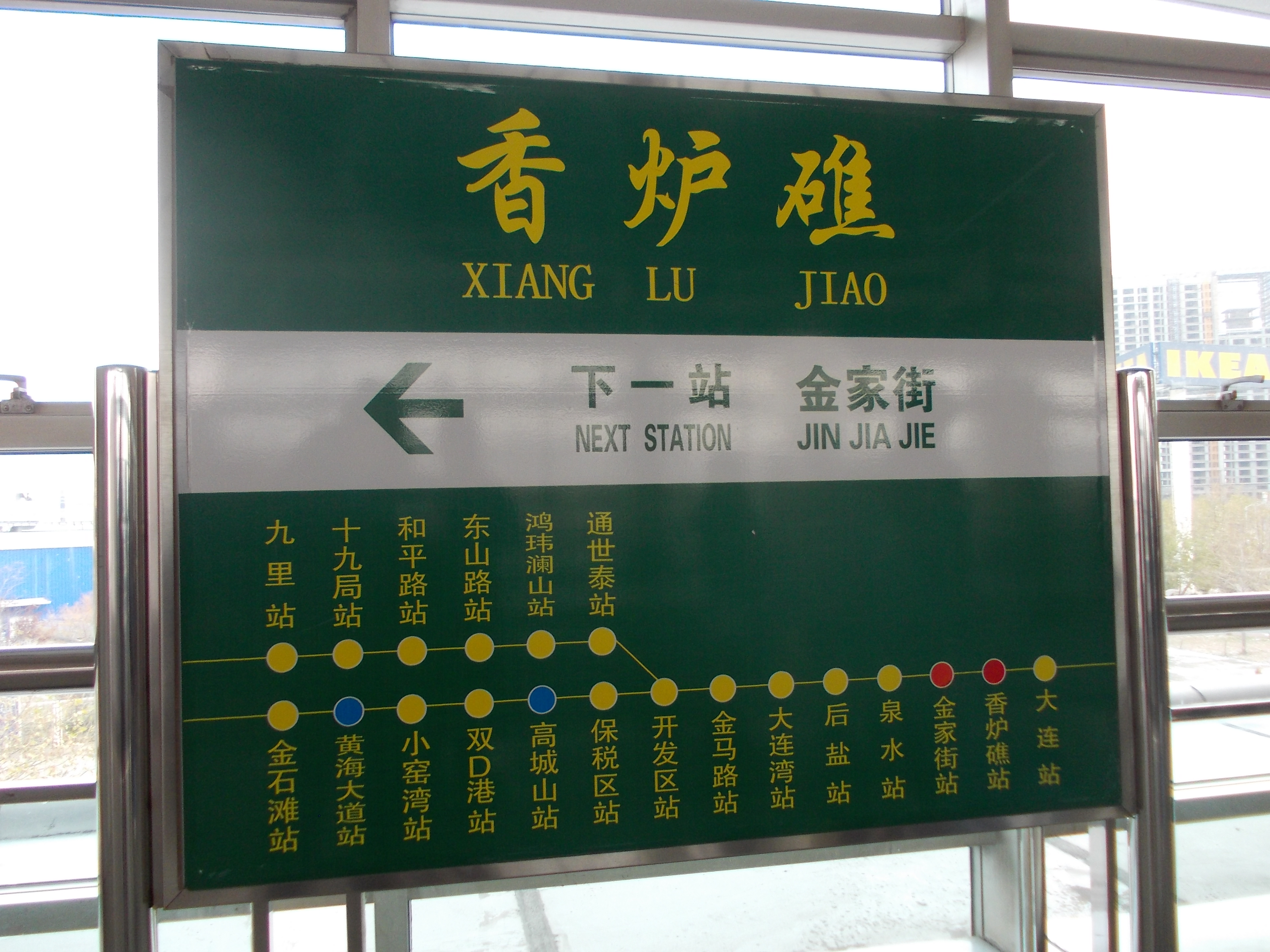
Sign at Xianglujiao station showing the names of all stations on Line 3

Service routes			Station name		Connections	Distance km		Location
Service routes			English	Chinese	Connections	Distance km		Location
●	●		Dalian Railway Station	大连站	5 DLT	0.00	0.00	Xigang
●	●		Xianglujiao	香炉礁		2.50	2.50	Xigang
-	-		Suoyuwan West (planned)	梭鱼湾西				Ganjingzi
●	●		Jinjia Street	金家街	4	4.40	6.90	Ganjingzi
●	●		Quanshui	泉水		4.28	11.18	Ganjingzi
●	●		Houyan	后盐	5	3.38	14.56	Ganjingzi
●	●		Dalianwan	大连湾		6.56	21.12	Ganjingzi
●	●		Jinma Road	金马路		3.58	24.70	Jinzhou
●	●	●	Dalian Development Area	开发区		2.80	27.50	Jinzhou
●	●	|	Free Trade Zone	保税区		2.63	30.13	Jinzhou
●		|	DD Port	双D港		6.08	36.21	Jinzhou
●		|	Xiaoyaowan	小窑湾		2.79	39.00	Jinzhou
●		|	Golden Pebble Beach	金石滩		9.70	48.70	Jinzhou
		●	Tostem	通世泰		2.23	50.93	Jinzhou
		●	Phoenix Peak	鸿玮澜山		2.10	53.03	Jinzhou
		●	Dongshan Road	东山路		1.70	54.73	Jinzhou
		●	Heping Road	和平路		2.10	56.83	Jinzhou
		●	CR 19th Bureau	十九局		2.56	59.39	Jinzhou
		●	Jiuli	九里	13	2.37	61.76	Jinzhou
		↓	Through service to/from Pulandian Zhenxing Street via Line 13					
