= Line 5 (Dalian Metro) =

Metro line in Dalian

- Line 5 train leaving Houyan station

Overview
- Status: Operational
- Owner: Dalian
- Locale: Dalian, Liaoning, China
- Termini: Hutan Xinqu; Houguan
- Stations: 18

Service
- Type: Rapid transit
- System: Dalian Metro
- Operator(s): Dalian Metro Group Co., Ltd.
- Depot(s): Houguancun

Technical
- Line length: 24.484 km (15.2 mi)
- Number of tracks: 2
- Character: Underground
- Track gauge: 1,435 mm (4 ft 8 1/2 in)

Line 5 of the Dalian Metro (Chinese: 大连地铁5号线; pinyin: Dàlián Dìtiě Wǔ Hào Xiàn), is a rapid transit line and 6th Metro line in Dalian, Liaoning, China. It runs from the north to the south. The line, with 18 stations, opened on 17 March 2023.

== History ==
Construction of Line 5 started on 30 March 2017.

The trial operation without passengers began on 1 December 2022.

The line opened on 17 March 2023. Labor Park station opened on 6 April 2023.

== Stations ==
Station name		Connections	Distance km		Location
English	Chinese	Connections	Distance km		Location
Hutan Xinqu	虎滩新区		0.00	0.00	Zhongshan
Tigerbeach Park	虎滩公园		1.12	1.12	Zhongshan
Xiuyue Street	秀月街		1.32	2.44	Zhongshan
Taoyuan	桃源		0.85	3.29	Zhongshan
Qingyun Street	青云街		0.86	4.15	Zhongshan
Shikui Road	石葵路		0.91	5.06	Zhongshan
Labor Park	劳动公园		1.17	6.23	Zhongshan
Qingniwaqiao	青泥洼桥	2	1.10	7.33	Zhongshan
Dalian Railway Station	大连站	3	0.56	7.89	Xigang
Suoyuwan South	梭鱼湾南		3.58	11.47	Ganjingzi
Suoyuwan	梭鱼湾	4	1.09	12.56	Ganjingzi
Ganjingzi Street	甘井子街		1.60	14.16	Ganjingzi
Ganbei Road	甘北路		0.72	14.88	Ganjingzi
Zhonghua East Road	中华东路		1.79	16.67	Ganjingzi
Quanshui East	泉水东		1.14	17.81	Ganjingzi
Longhua Road	龙华路		1.18	18.99	Ganjingzi
Houyan	后盐	3	0.94	19.93	Ganjingzi
Houguan	后关		3.55	24.48	Ganjingzi
