= Golden Pebble Beach station =

Metro station in Dalian, China

Coordinates: 39°05′12″N 122°00′21″E

Golden Pebble Beach 金石滩
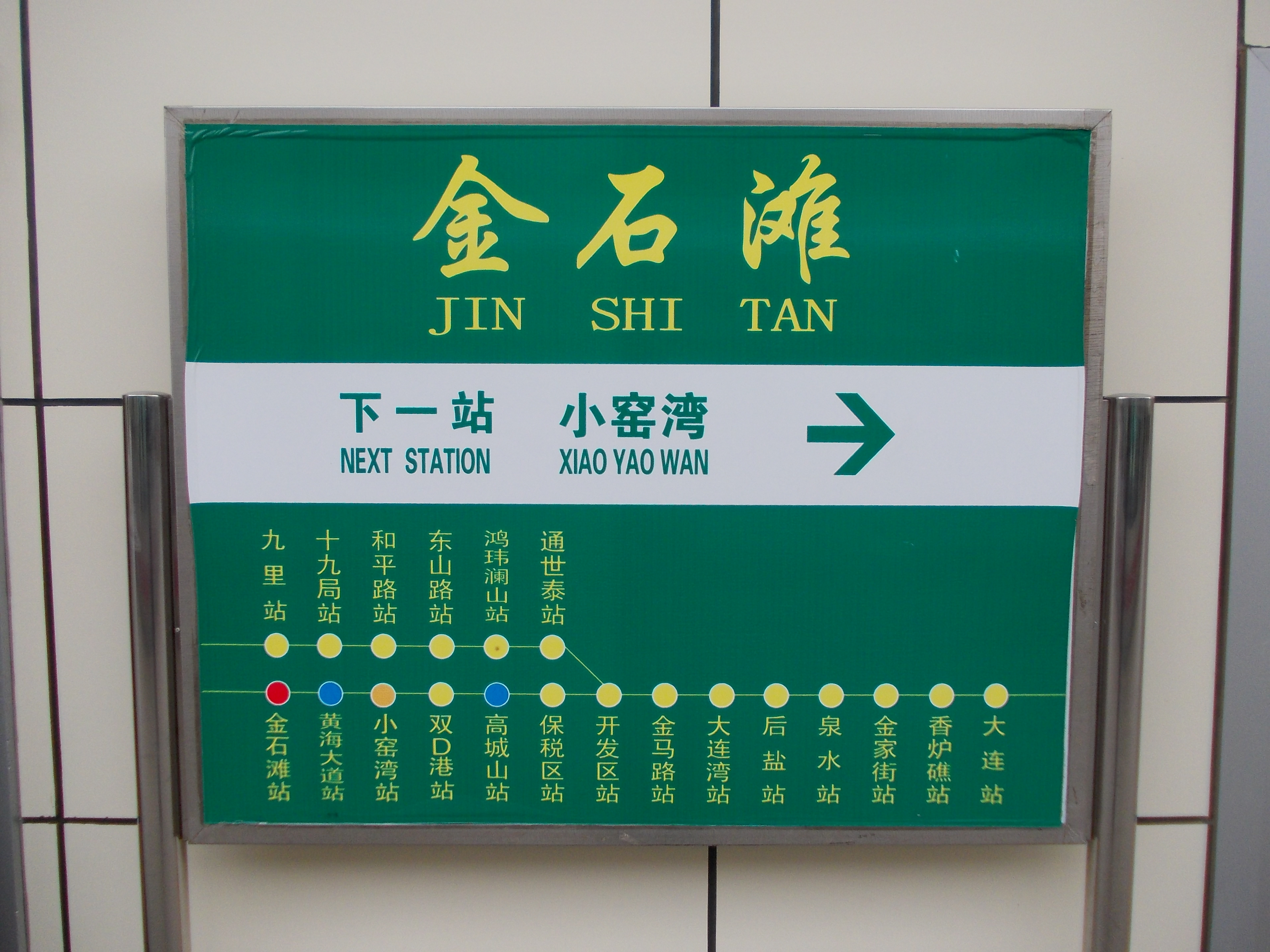

General information
- Location: Dalian, Liaoning; China
- Operated by: Dalian Public Transportation Group Co. Ltd.
- Line: Line 3

Services
Preceding station	Dalian Metro	Following station
Xiaoyaowan towards Dalian Railway Station	Line 3	Terminus
Location

Golden Pebble Beach is a station on Line 3 of the Dalian Metro in Liaoning Province, China. It is located in the Jinzhou District of Dalian City.

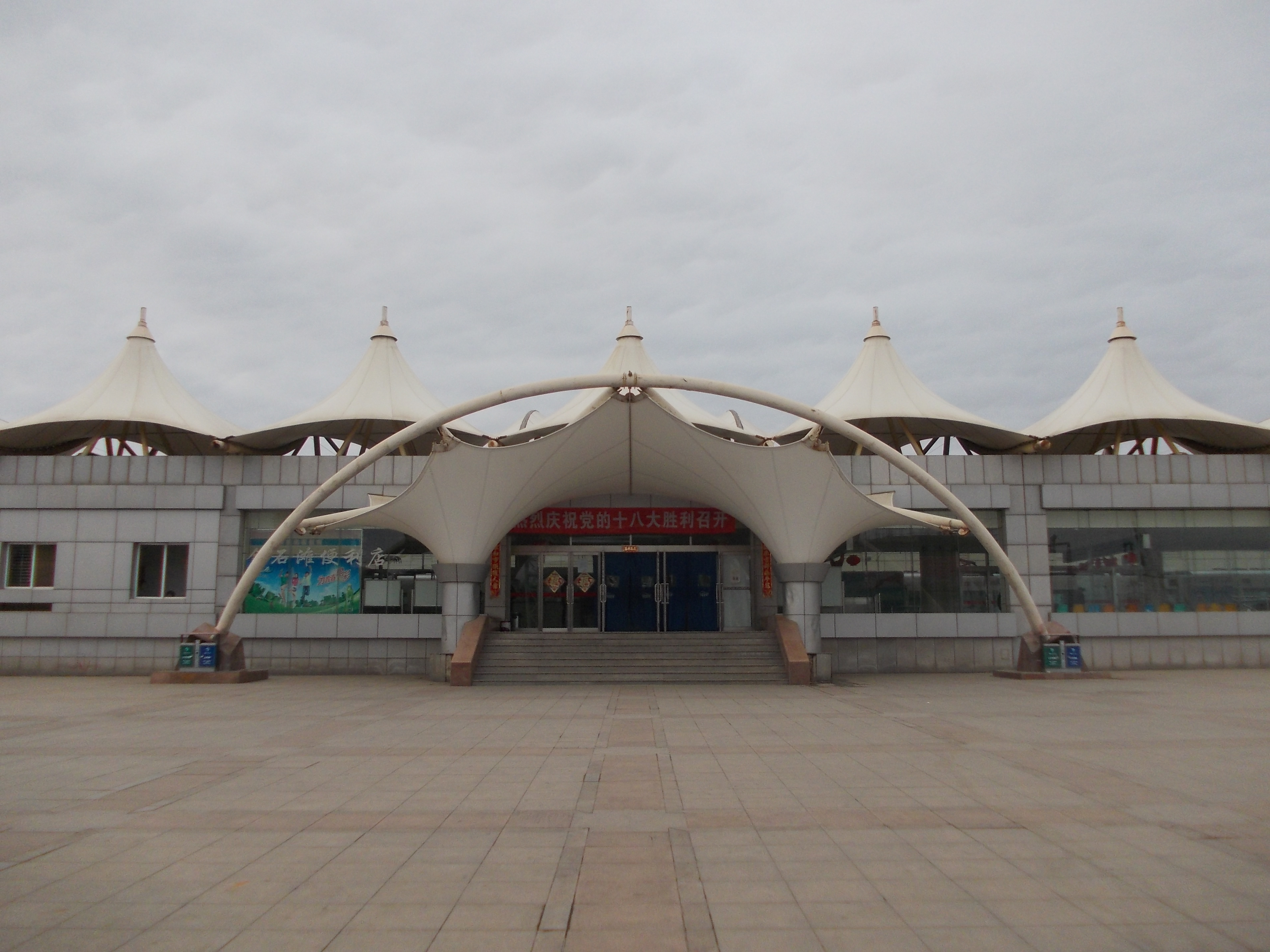
Entrance

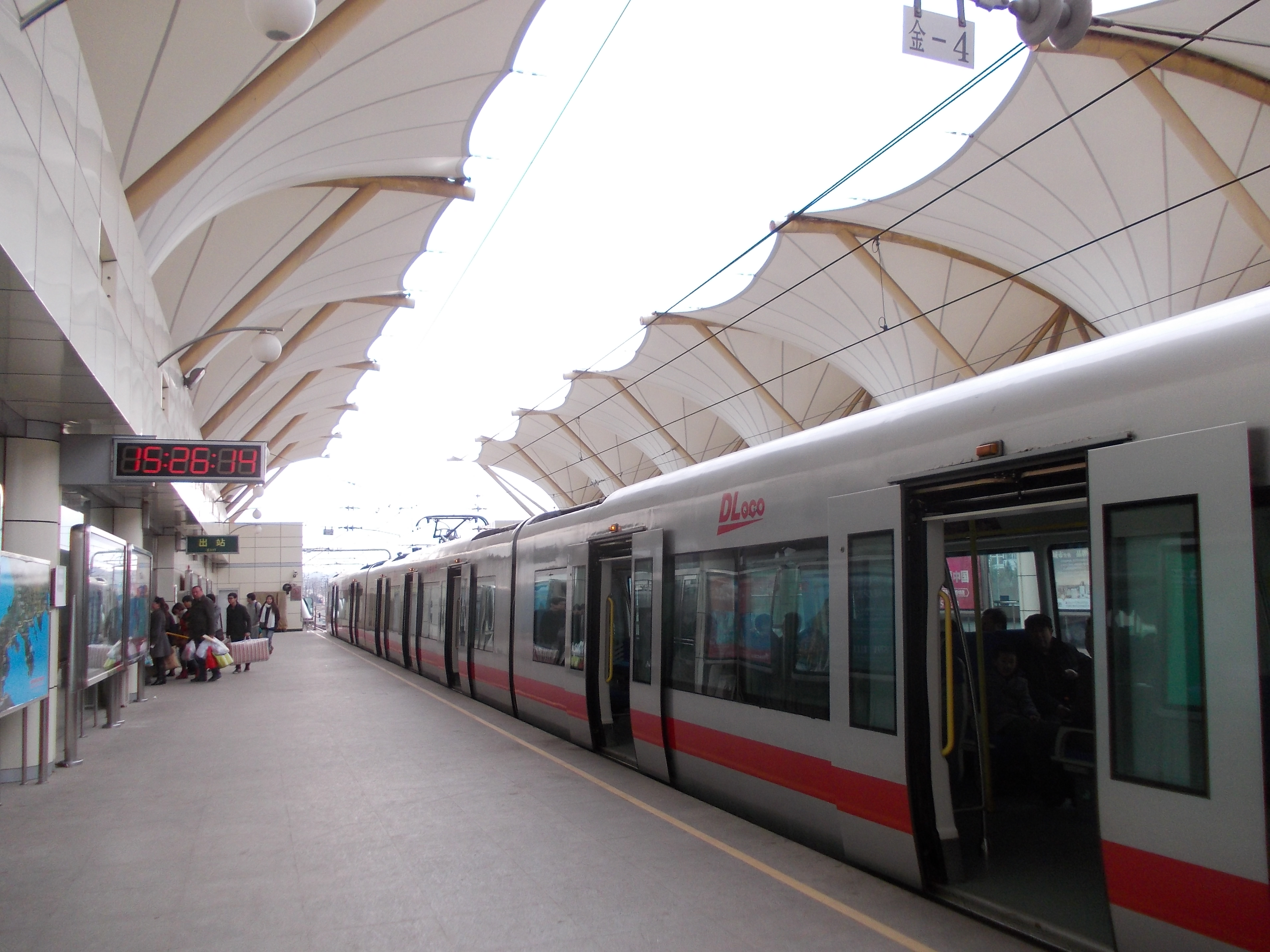
Platform
