= Jiuli station =

Metro station in Dalian, China

Coordinates: 39°09′07″N 121°44′35″E

Jiuli 九里 METRO
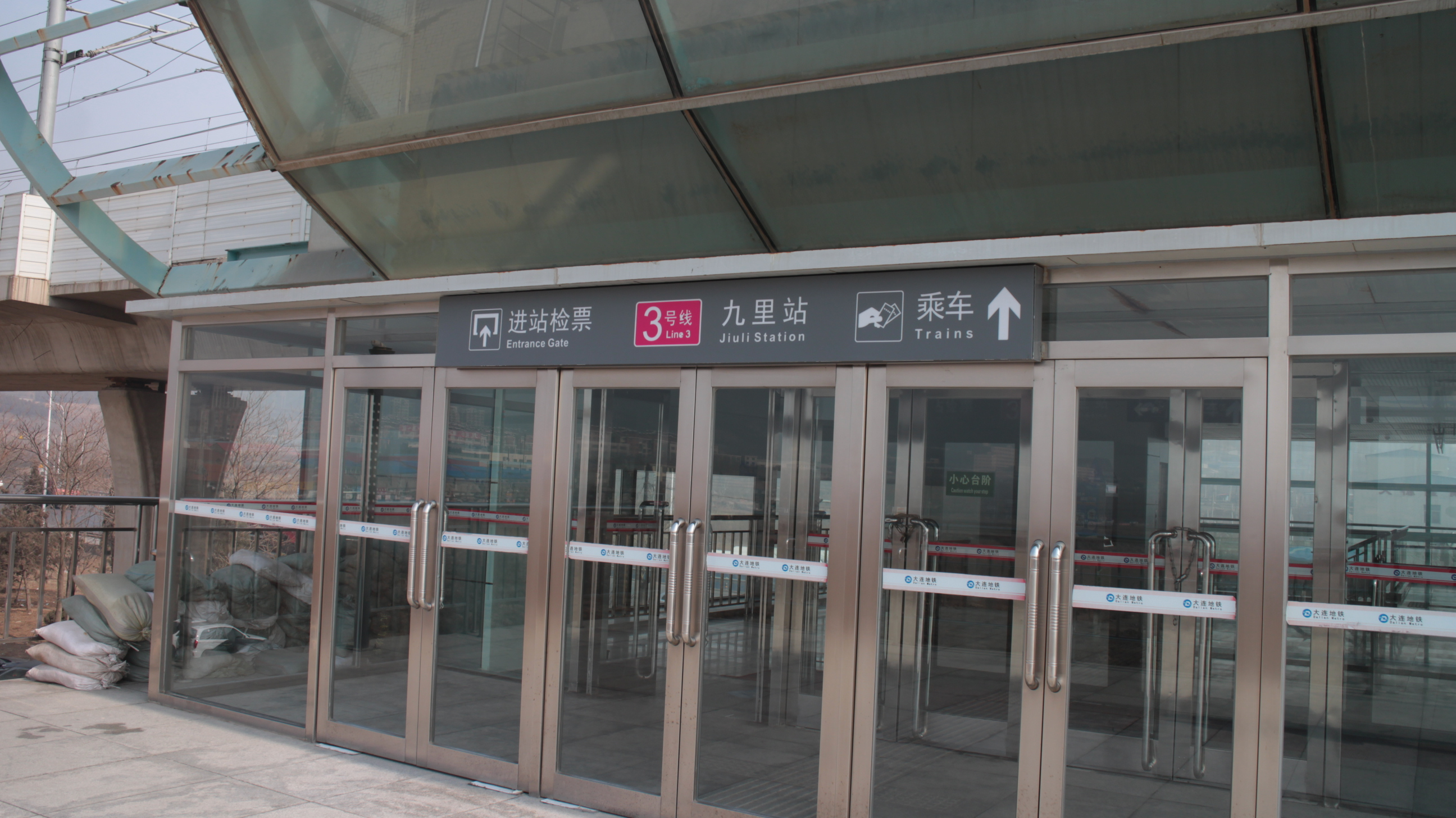

General information
- Location: Dalian, Liaoning; China
- Operated by: Dalian Public Transportation Group Co. Ltd.
- Lines: Line 3 Line 13

Services
Preceding station	Dalian Metro	Following station
CR 19th Bureau towards Dalian Railway Station	Line 3	through to Line 13
through to Line 3	Line 13	Shisanli towards Pulandian Zhenxing Street
Location

Jiuli is a station on Line 3 and Line 13 of the Dalian Metro in Liaoning Province, China. It is located in the Jinzhou District of Dalian City.
