= Dalian Metro =

Rapid transit system of Dalian, Liaoning, China

Coordinates: 38.9882°N 121.6592°E

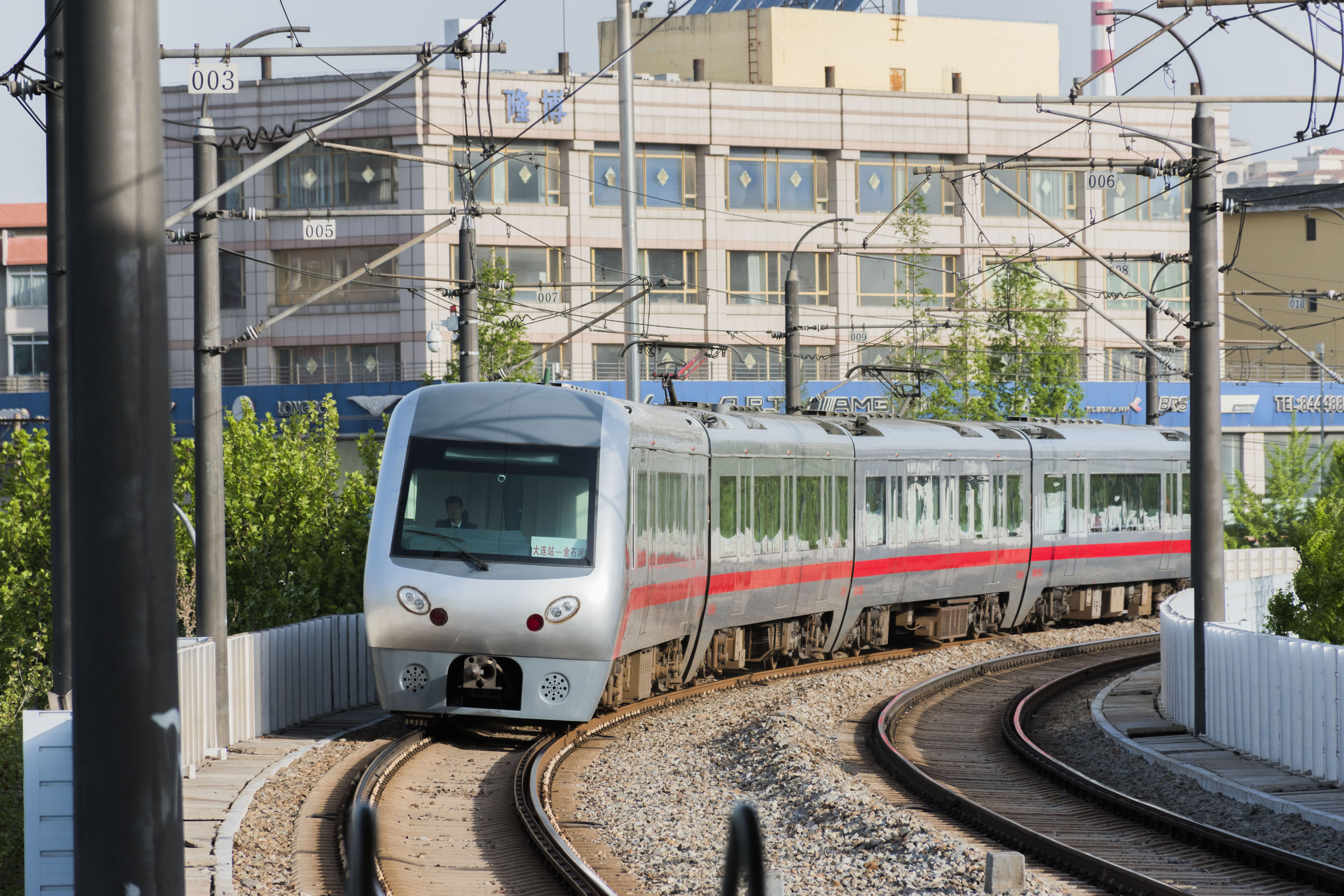

Overview
- Locale: Dalian, Liaoning, China
- Transit type: Rapid transit
- Number of lines: 6
- Number of stations: 107
- Daily ridership: 431,000 (2017 Daily Avg.)
- Annual ridership: 157.2 million (2017)
- Website: http://www.dlmetro.com

Operation
- Began operation: 8 November 2002; 24 years ago
- Operators: Dalian Metro Group Co., Ltd. (All lines)

Technical
- System length: 237.7 km (148 mi)
- Electrification: 1,500 V DC
System map

Dalian Mass Transit System
- Simplified Chinese: 大连轨道交通
- Traditional Chinese: 大連軌道交通
Transcriptions
Standard Mandarin
- Hanyu Pinyin: Dàlián Gǔidào Jiāotōng

Dalian Metro
- Simplified Chinese: 大连地铁
- Traditional Chinese: 大連地鐵
Transcriptions
Standard Mandarin
- Hanyu Pinyin: Dàlián Dìtiě

Dalian Rapid Transit (DRT)
- Simplified Chinese: 大连快轨
- Traditional Chinese: 大連快軌
Transcriptions
Standard Mandarin
- Hanyu Pinyin: Dàlián Kuàiguǐ

The Dalian Metro is a rapid transit system in the city of Dalian, Liaoning, China. The metro system opened on 1 May 2003. The system currently in operation consists of 6 lines: Line 1, Line 2, Line 3, Line 5, Line 12, and Line 13.

== Lines in operation ==
Map of Dalian Metro.

Line	Terminals (District)		Commencement	Newest Extension	Length km	Stations
1	Yaojia (Ganjingzi)	Hekou (Ganjingzi)	October 30, 2015	June 7, 2017	28.34	22
2	Dalian North Railway Station (Ganjingzi)	Haizhiyun (Zhongshan)	May 22, 2015	September 30, 2022	37.97	29
3	Dalian Railway Station (Zhongshan)	Golden Pebble Beach (Jinzhou)	November 8, 2002	December 28, 2008	63.45	18
3	Dalian Development Area (Jinzhou)	Jiuli (Note: Through operation between Line 3 Branch and Line 13 is currently provided) (Jinzhou)	November 8, 2002	December 28, 2008	63.45	18
5	Hutan Xinqu (Zhongshan)	Houguan (Ganjingzi)	March 17, 2023	-	24.48	18
12	Hekou (Ganjingzi)	Lüshun New Port (Lüshunkou)	May 1, 2014	June 7, 2017	40.35	8
13	Jiuli (Jinzhou)	Pulandian Zhenxing Street (Pulandian)	December 28, 2021	-	43.15	12
Total					237.74	107

=== Line 1 ===
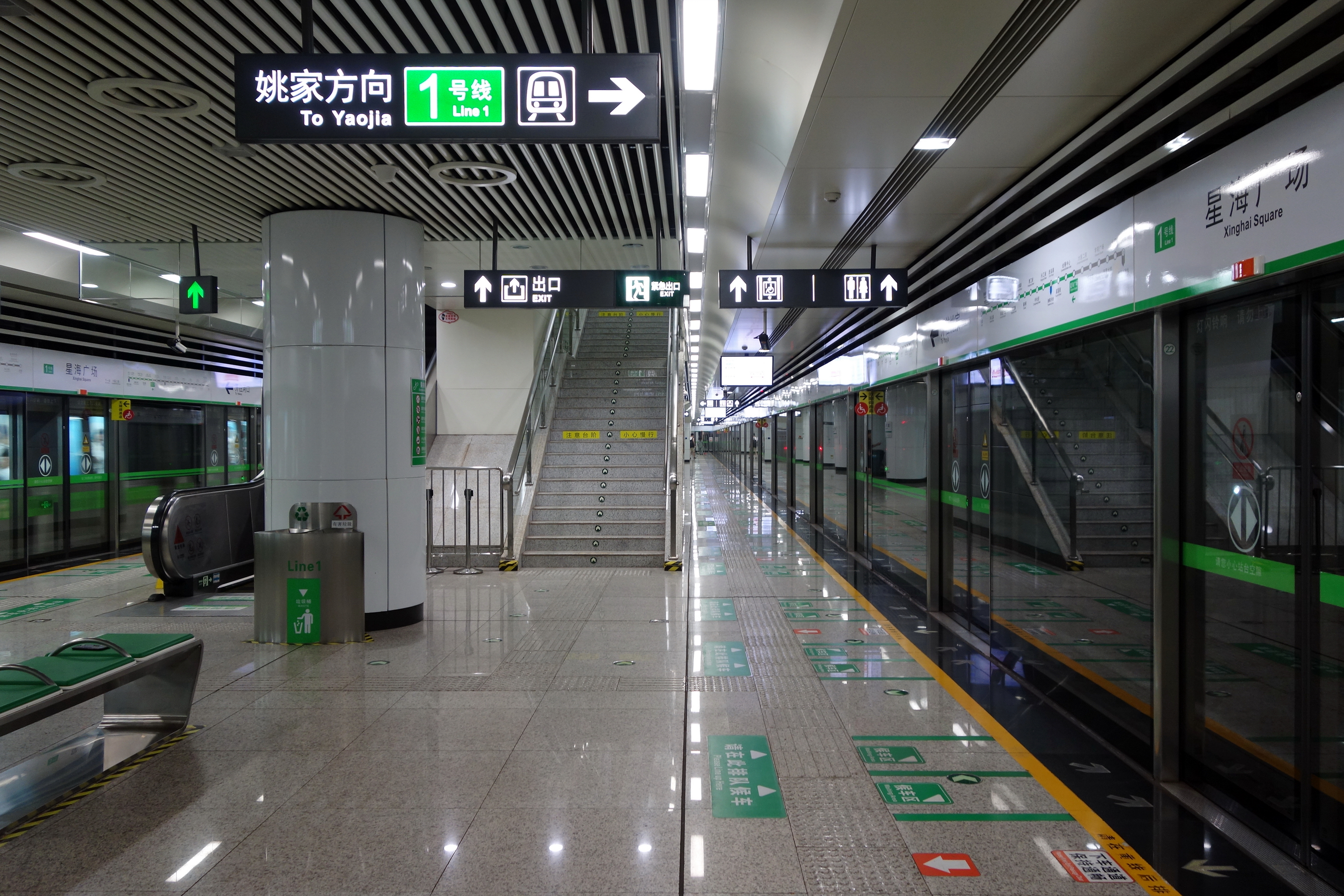
Xinghai Square station on Line 1

Line 1, which opened in 2015, connects west and central Dalian with north Dalian. Its total length is 28.34 km (17.61 mi), with 22 underground stations.

Line 1 runs from Jinzhou Bay International Airport (Under Construction) to Hekou. Its stations are Jinzhou International Airport (Under Construction and will be share the same rails with line 5), T2/T3 terminal (Reserved and will be share rails with line 5), Bohai Road (Pending Approval and will be share rails with line 5), Houguan (Pending Approval, Intercharge with line 5)，Huibai Road (Reserved), Yaojia, Dalian North Railway Station (Interchange with Line 2, Intercharge with line 13 in the future), Huabei Road, Huananbei, Huanan Square, Qianshan Road, Songjiang Road (Intercharge with line 4 in the future), Dongwei Road, Chunliu, Xianggong Street, Zhongchang Street, Xinggong Street, Xi'an Road (Interchange with Line 2), Fuguo Street, Convention and Exhibition Center, Xinghai Square, 2nd Affiliated Hospital of Dalian, Heishijiao, Xueyuan Square, Maritime University, Qixianling, and Hekou (Intercharge with line 12, also known as "The Birthplace of the "Hekou Flying Men""). Line 1 has three phases. Phase 1 runs from Yaojia to the Convention and Exhibition Center, Phase 2 to Hekou and the remainder in Phase 3 runs from Yaojia to Jinzhou Bay International Airport (the 3rd phase is incomplete right now). Line 1's color is green.

=== Line 2 ===
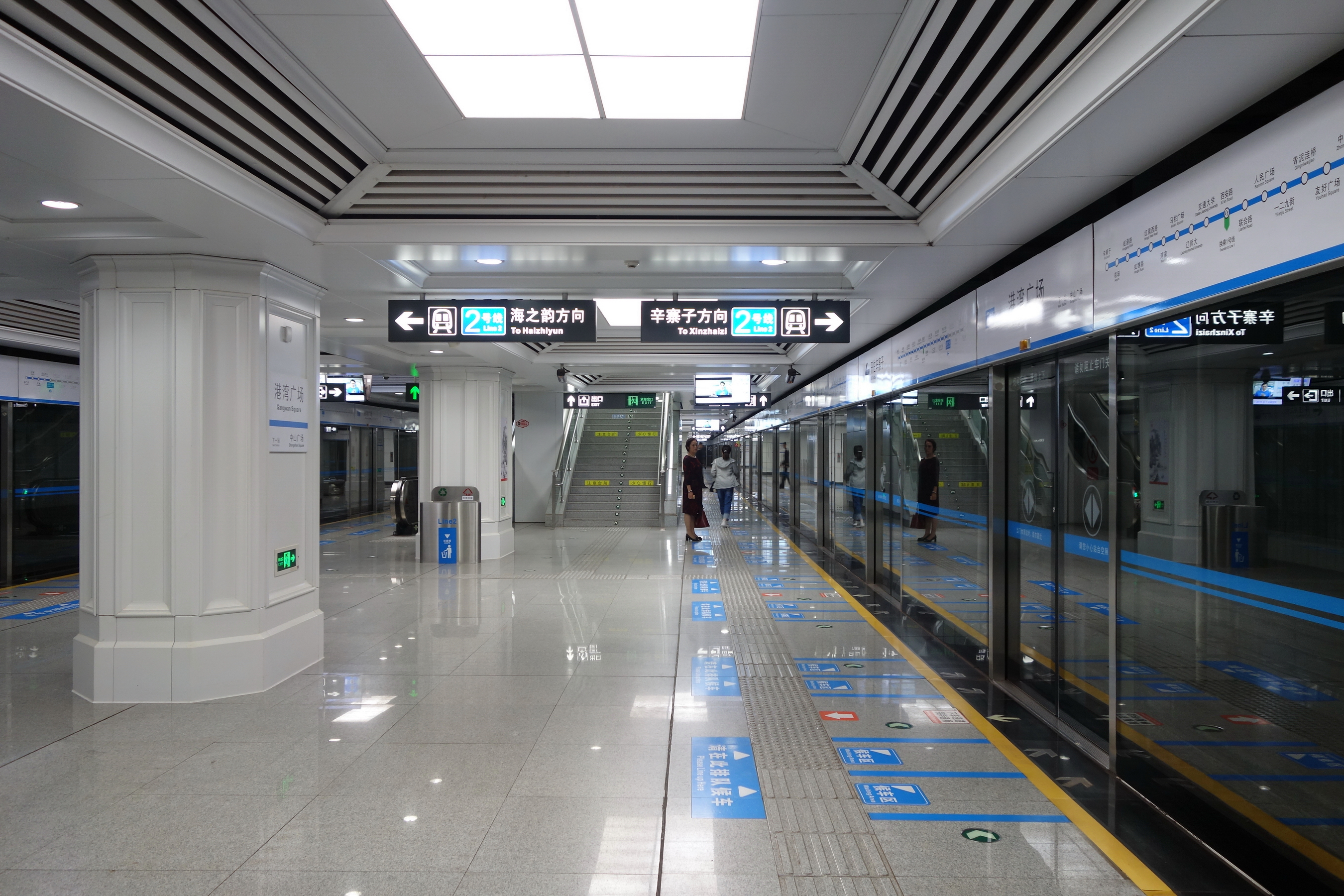
Gangwan Square station on Line 2

Line 2, opened in 2015, connects east central Dalian with west central Dalian. As of 2025, the line is 37.97 km (23.59 mi) long with 29 stations. The line is C-shaped.

The line runs from Haizhiyun to Dalian North Railway Station.Stations along the route: Dalian North Railway Station (Intercharge with line 1, intercgarge with line 13 in the future), Nanguanling, Sports center, Health center, Houge, Gezhenpu Zhongge, Qiange, Xinzhaizi (Intercharge with line 4 in the future), Airport (DLC, Dalian Zhoushuizi International Airport), Honggang Road, Hongjin Road, Hongqi West Road, Wanjia, Malan Square, Liaoning Normal University, Dalian Jiaotong University, Xi'an Road (Intercharge with line 1), Lianhe Road, Renmin Square (People's Square), Yi'erjiu Street (129 Street/One Two Nine Street), Qingniwaqiao (Intercharge with line 5), Youhao Square (Friendly Square), Zhongshan Suare, Gangwan Square, Conference Center, Donggang (East Port), Donghai, (East Sea) and Haizhiyun (Rhythm of the sea). The line was constructed in two phases: Phase 1 from Airport to Haizhiyun, and Phase 2 from airport to Dalian North Railway Station. Line 2's color is blue.

=== Line 3 ===
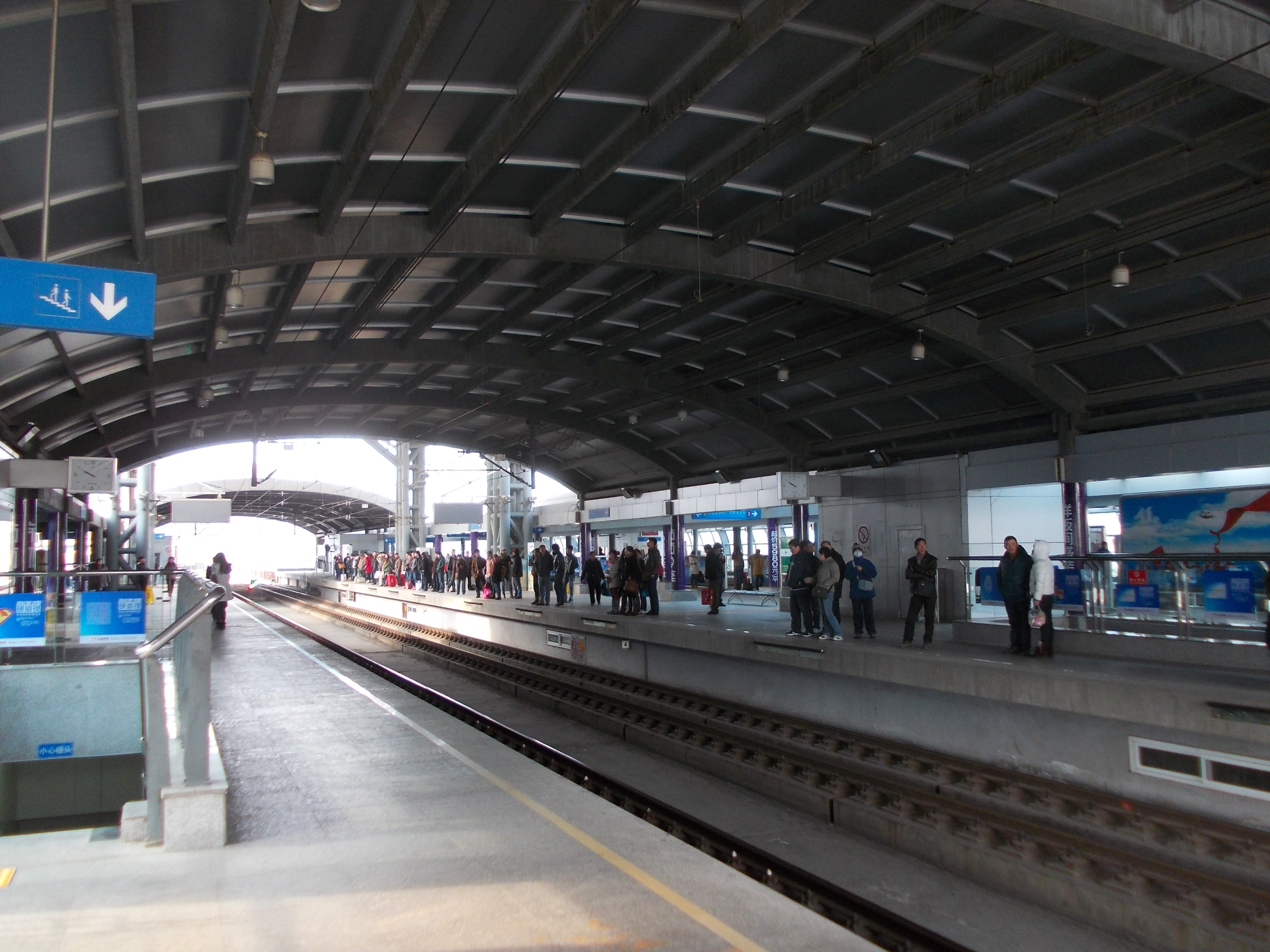
Dalian Development Area station on Line 3

Line 3, also known as the Jinzhou Eastern Line ---- Dalian's first metro line which opened in 2003. It connects the Dalian Development Zone and Golden Pebble Beach with the city center. It is a serpentine line, mostly elevated or at grade, there is only 1 tunnel for this line where is between Jinjia Street and Quanshui. And it runs from Dalian Railway Station to Golden Pebble Beach. The stations along the line is Dalian Railway Station/Metro Dalian Station, Xianglujiao, Jinjia Street, Quanshui, Houyan, Dalianwan (Dalian Bay), Jinma Road, Development Zone, Free Trade Zone, DD Port, Xiaoyaowan (Xiaoyao Bay) and Golden Pebble Beach. The northern area of the city, where the Economic and Technology Development Zone is located, is not well served by buses. Line 3, beginning at the downtown commercial center (near Dalian Railway Station), runs through five administrative districts of the city and serves as express transit between the northern (developing) region and the downtown area. The line extends northward to Golden Pebble Beach (Jinshitan Scenic Area), a national scenic park 50 km (31 mi) from the city center. A branch line was opened in 2008 that connects central Dalian with Jinzhou District (金州区), with seven stations from south to north which are Development Zone, Tostem, Phoenix Peak, Dongshan Road, Heping Road (Peace Road), CR 19th Bureau and Jiuli (Through service to/from Pulandian Zhenxing Street via Line 13 until the Second Phase of Line 13 opens for operation). The branch line begins at Dalian Development Area and stretches northwest ending at Jiuli.

All stations have side platforms. Platform screen doors were added to Line 3 in November, 2023. Tracks in the platform area have no ballast (gravel); however, tracks outside the station are on ballast. All stations are covered by a combination of transparent corrugated sheets and a concrete roof. Line 3's color is magenta.

=== Line 5 ===
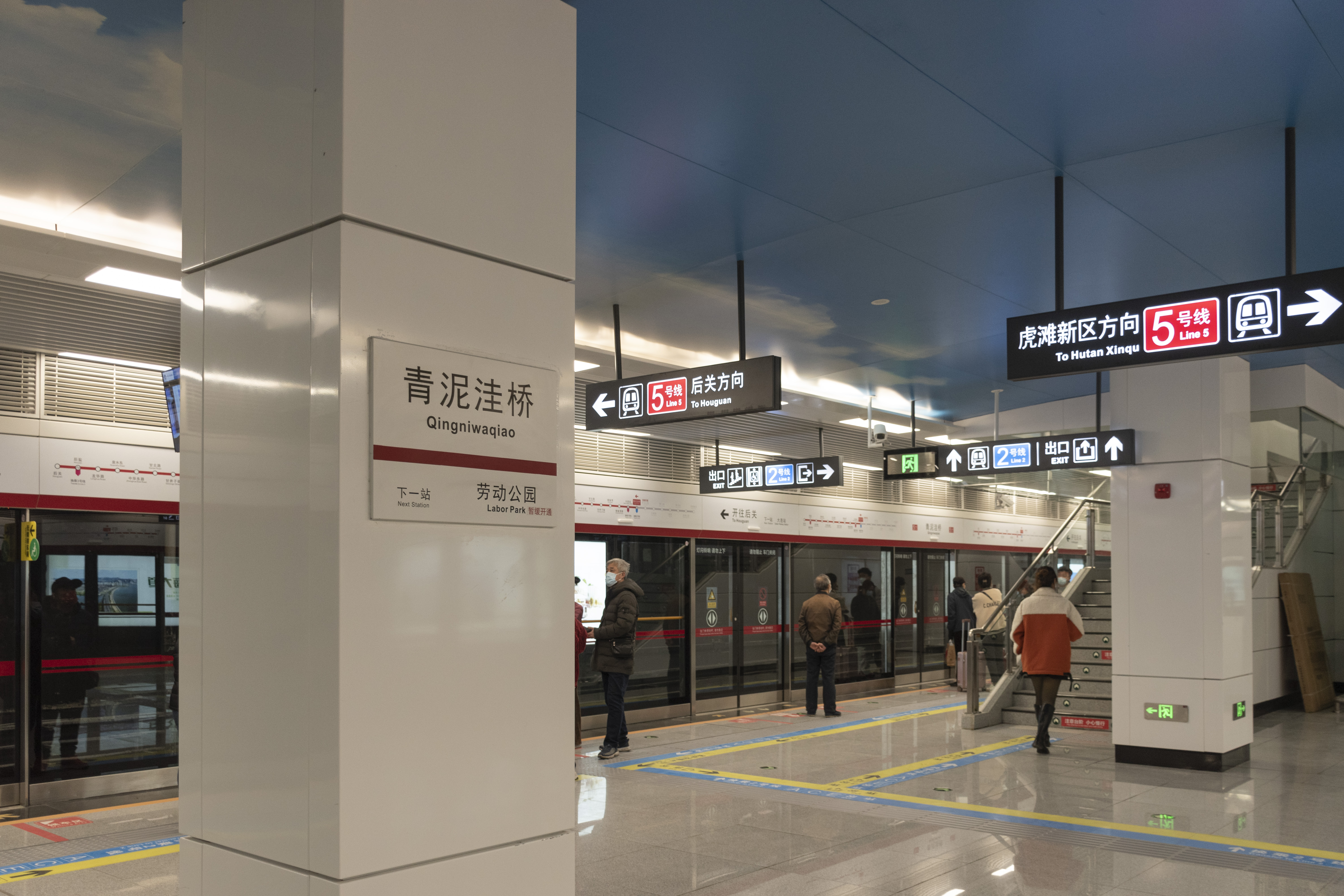
Qingniwaqiao station on Line 5

Line 5 runs from Houguan to Dalian Railway Station and then to Hutan Xinqu. Stations along from North to South are: Jinzhou Bay International Airport (Under Construction and will be share rails with line 1), T2/T3 terminal (Reserved and will be shard rails with line 1), Bohai Road (Pending Approval and will be share rails with line 1), Houguan (Intercharge with line 1), Houyan (Intercharge with line 3 and intercharge with line 13 in the future), Longhua Road, Quanshui East, Zhonghua East Road, Ganbie Road, Ganjingzi Street, Suoyuwan (Intercharge with line 4 in the future), Suoyuwan South, [Undersea Tunnel], Dalian Railway Station (Intercharge with line 3), Qingniwaqiao (Intercharge with line 2), Labor Park, Shiqui Road, Qingyun Street, Taoyuan, Xiuyue Street, Hutan Park, Hutan New District. The line opened on 17 March 2023 and is the newest metro line in Dalian so far. Line 5's color is red.

=== Line 12 ===
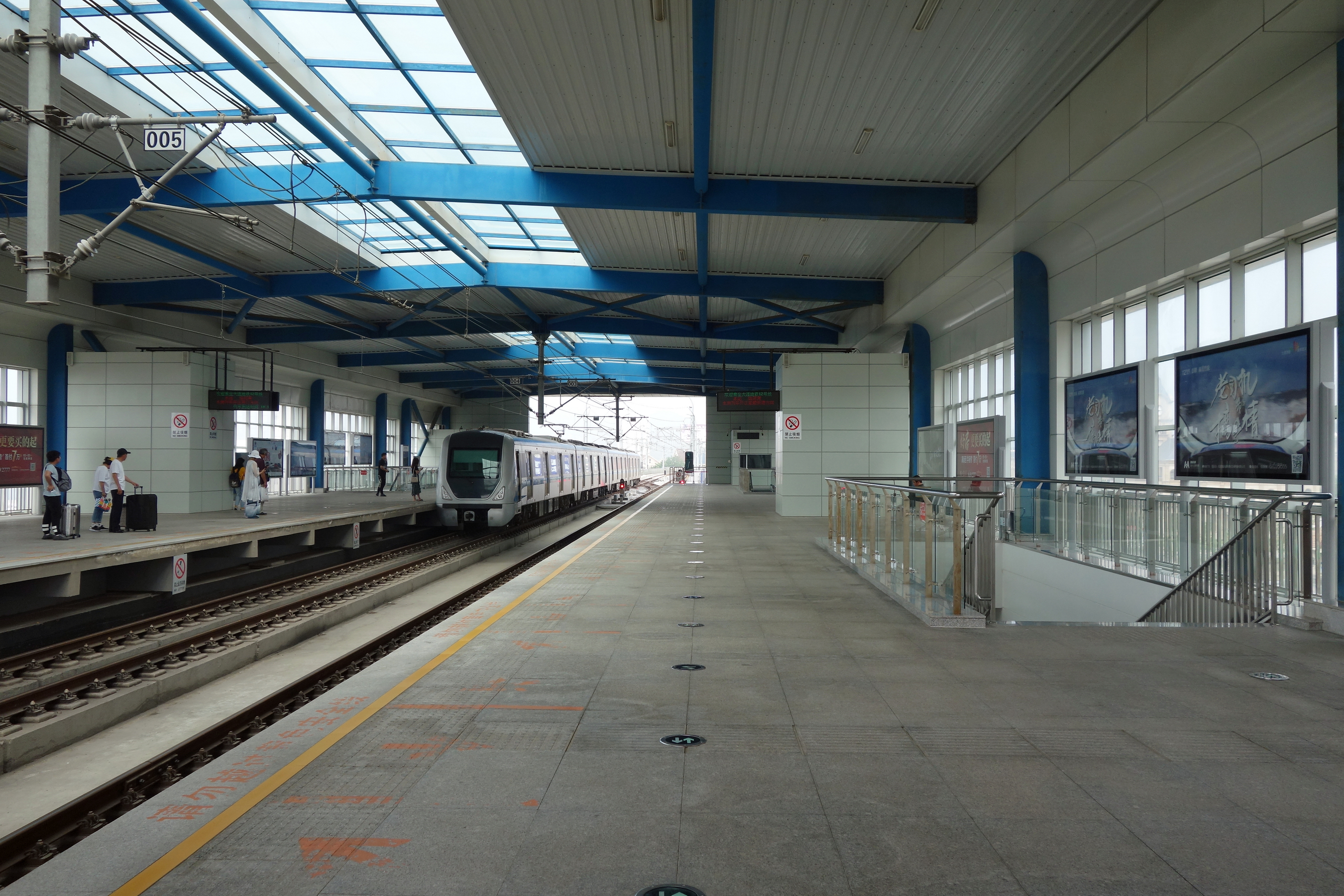
Tahewan station on Line 12

Line 12, also known as the Tram Route 202 Extension Line, was opened in 2013 and connects central Dalian with Lüshunkou District. Its total length is 40.35 km (25.07 mi), with 8 stations from west to east: Lushun New Port, Tieshan, Lushun, Tahewan (Tahe Bay) Longwangtang, Huangnichuan, Caidaling, and Hekou (interchange with Line 1). Line 12's color is purple.

=== Line 13 (Phase I) ===
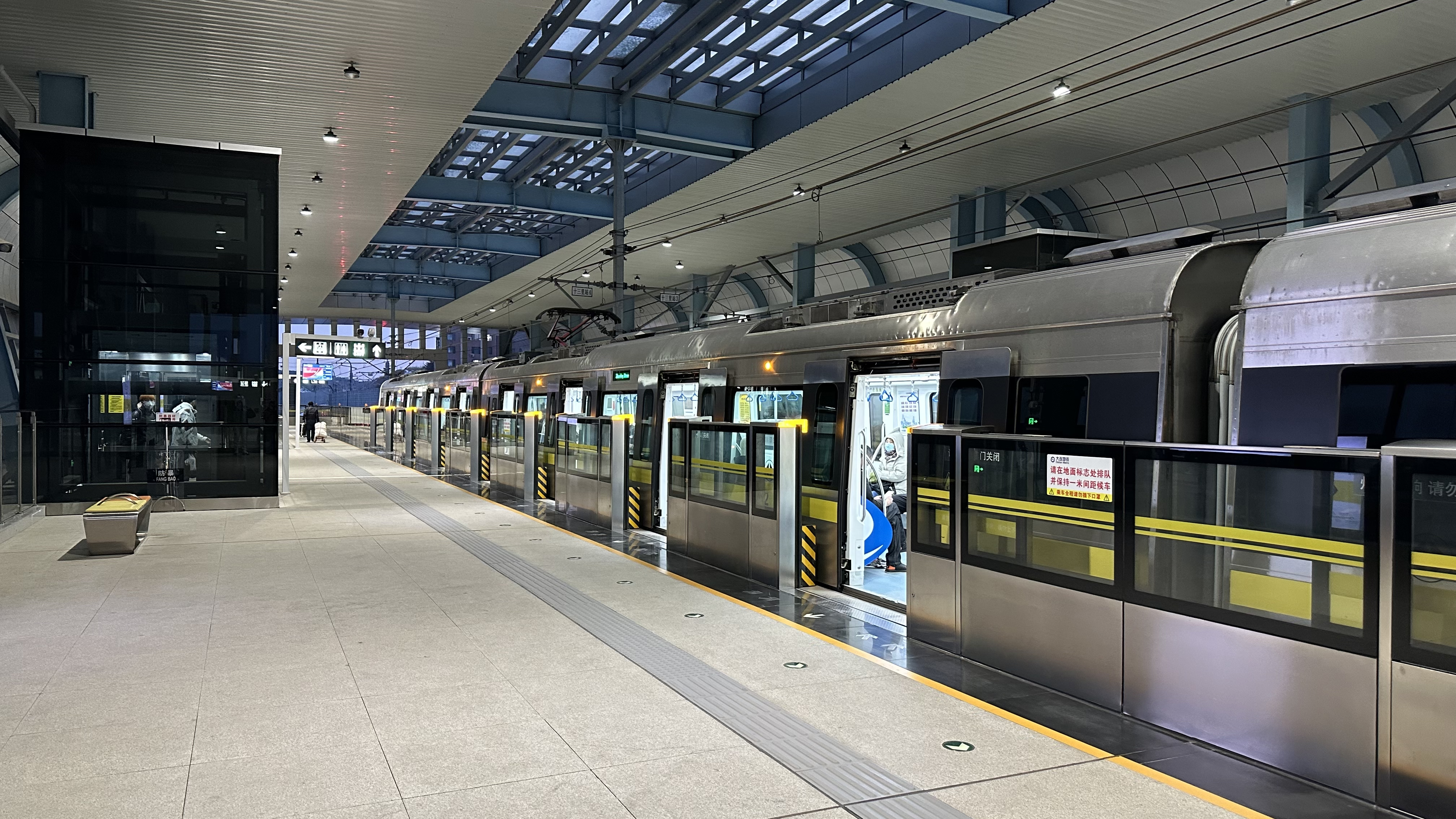
Shisanli station on Line 13

The first phase of Line 13 runs from Jiuli to Pulandian Zhenxing Street. It opened on 28 December 2021. Line 13's color is yellow.

== Future development ==
=== Under construction ===
Line	Phase/extension	Terminals		Scheduled Opening	Total Length in km	Stations
4	Phase 1	Yingchengzi	Suoyuwan	2030	23.01	17

==== Line 4 ====
Phase 1 of Line 4 will be 23.01 km in length with 17 stations, from Yingchengzi to Suoyuwan. It is expected to open in 2027. Proposed stations are Suoyuwan (interchange with Line 5), Dongfang Road, Jinjia Street (interchange with Line 3), Jinsanjiao, Songjiang Road (interchange with Line 1), Xibei Road, Xinda Street, Zelong Lake, Polytechnic University, Xinzhaizi (interchange with Line 2), Xinping Street, Yinxing Avenue, Zhoujiagou, Dongnanshan, Qianmu, Xingfucun, Yingchengzi.(house Demolition may can cause Yingchengzi and Xingfucun station postponed opening

=== Planned ===
Dalian Metro long-term plan

Line	Phase/extension	Terminals		Scheduled Opening	Total Length in km	Stations
1	Phase III	Yaojia	Dalian New Airport (Dalian Jinzhouwan Airport)	TBA	14.1	4
13	Phase II	Dalian North Railway Station	Jiuli	TBA	22.92	11
7		Baiheshanzhuang	Jinzou West	TBA		

In 2009 the Dalian government announced plans for nine metro lines spanning a total of 262.9 kilometres (163.4 mi), which would include the existing Line 3 and the branch of Line 3.

Four lines have been finalized as of 2012. The expansion project (in accordance with Chinese standards for the design and construction of metros) will use around 70 percent local labor and materials. Trains will be equipped with ATO, and stations will use an automatic fare-collection system. When lines open, they will initially operate at 38,000 p/h/d; over time, with the addition of more trains and decreasing headway, a capacity of 43,200 p/h/d is planned. The expansion program will ease traffic in Dalian (improving travel around the city for the 12th National Games of China, which will be held in Liaoning in 2013).

According to a National Development and Reform Foundation (2009) document, the urban rail transit construction plan (2009–2016) in Dalian was approved. According to the plan, the Dalian transit project is expected to invest ¥22 billion from 2009 to 2016 to build lines 1-5.

=== Long-term plan ===
- Line 6
- Line 7
- Line 8
- Line 9
- Line 10
- Line 11
- Line 14
- Line 15
- Line 16
- Line 17
- Line 18
- Line 19
- Line 20

== Tickets ==
The lowest fare between two stations is two yuan; the fare between more than two stations is two yuan. The full fare between Dalian Station and Golden Pebble Beach is eight yuan; between Dalian Station and Jiuli the fare is seven yuan. The Pearl Card is a discounted, monthly smart card.

== Rolling stock ==
The trains were developed and manufactured by DLoco, Dalian Locomotive and Rolling Stock Company. As of 2012, 10 trains are running on line 3 at an average speed of 60 km/h (37 mph).

Specification

- 1500 volts DC voltage
- Train length: 78 meters
- Train width 2.8 metres (9 ft 2 in)
- Train height 3.8 metres (12 ft)
- Axle load: 14 tons
- Capacity: 800 passengers (176 seated)
- Seats: 176
- Traction power for AC drive: 1,440 kilowatts (180 kW × 8)
- Maximum speed: 100 km/h (62 mph)
- Full range of cars equipped with 20 seats (FG0001-0020—includes 0001-0010 as the first batch, 0011-0020 for the second batch; two groups of slightly-different vehicles)

Dalian Metro ordered 38 type B trainsets in six-car formations. 18 and 20 sets will run on the future lines 1 and 2 respectively. They will have a similar lightweight, corrosion-resistant stainless-steel body. The design speed is set to 80 km/h (50 mph); each train will have a capacity of 1,440 passengers.

== Naming ==
Operation name	Plan name
Line 1	M1
Line 2	M2
Line 3	R3
Line 4	M4
Line 5	M5
Line 6	M6
Line 7	M7
Line 8	M8
Line 9	M9
Line 10	M10
Line 11	R1, R9, R10
Route 202 Ext. Line → Line 12	R2
Line 13	R4
Line 14	R5
Line 15	R6
Line 16	R7
Line 17	R8
Line 18	P1
Line 19	P2
Line 20	P3

== See also ==
- List of metro systems
- Rapid transit in China
- Urban rail transit in China

=== Other Transport in Dalian ===
- Trams in Dalian (Tram Route 201 and 202)
