= Dalian railway station =

Railway station in the city of Dalian, Liaoning, China

Dalian 大连
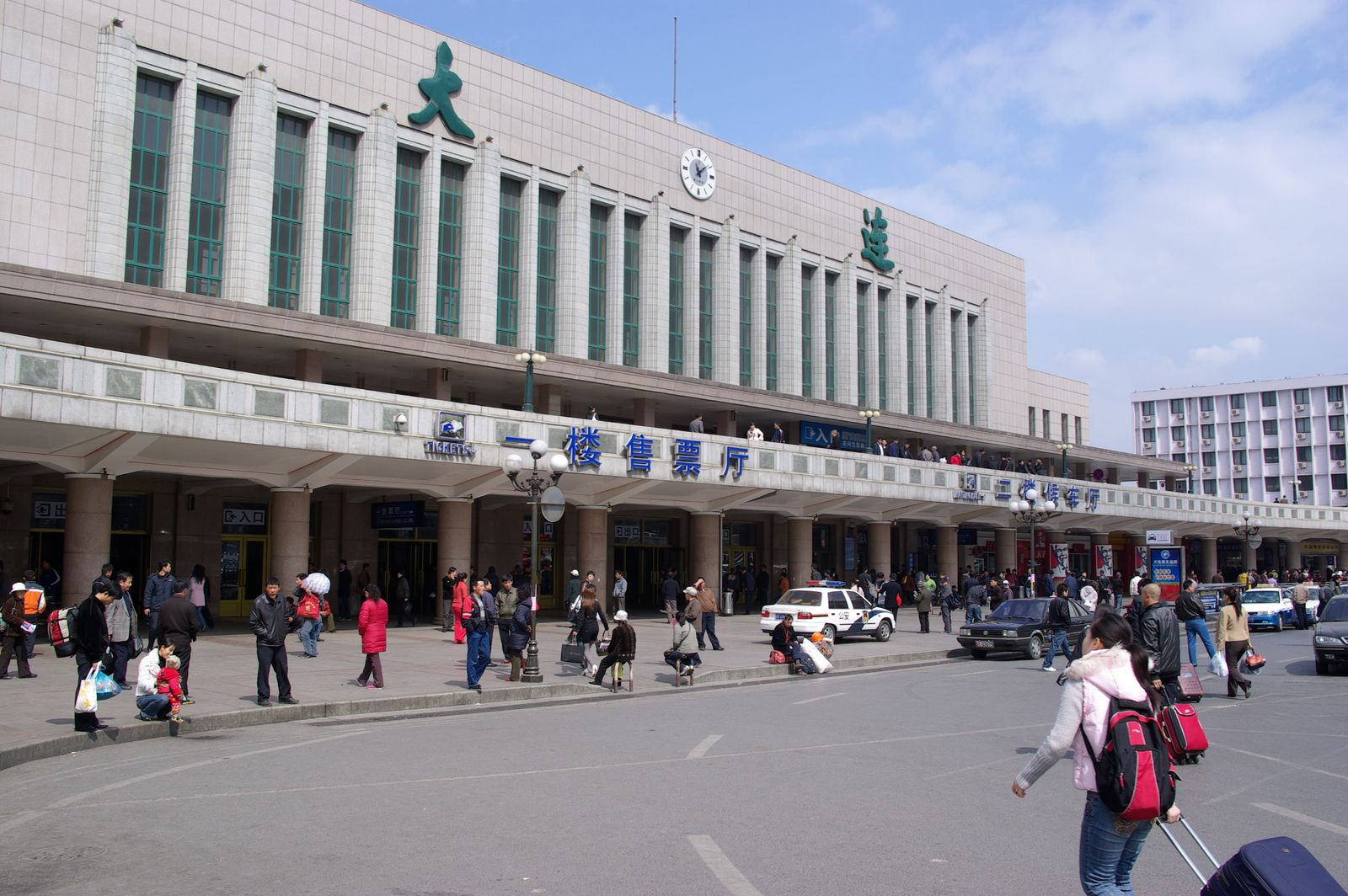
- Dalian railway station

General information
- Location: Changjiang Lu, Zhongshan District, Dalian, Liaoning; China
- Coordinates: 38°55′29″N 121°37′17″E
- Operator: China Railway Corporation
- Lines: Harbin–Dalian high-speed railway; Line 3 (Dalian Metro); Line 5 (Dalian Metro)
- Platforms: 5
- Connections: Bus terminal

Other information
- Station code: TMIS code: 53522; Telegraph code: DLT; Pinyin code: DLI
- Classification: 1st class station

History
- Opened: 1903

Services
Preceding station	China Railway High-speed	Following station
Dalian North towards Harbin	Harbin–Dalian high-speed railway	Terminus

Metro
Preceding station	Dalian Metro	Following station
Terminus	Line 3	Xianglujiao towards Golden Pebble Beach
Qingniwaqiao towards Hutan Xinqu	Line 5	Suoyuwan South towards Houguan
Location

Dalian railway station
- Simplified Chinese: 大连站
- Traditional Chinese: 大連站
Transcriptions
Standard Mandarin
- Hanyu Pinyin: Dàlián Zhàn

Dalian railway station (Chinese: 大连站; pinyin: Dàlián Zhàn) is a railway station of the Harbin–Dalian section of the Beijing–Harbin High-Speed Railway. It is located in Zhongshan District, Dalian, Liaoning, China.

== History ==
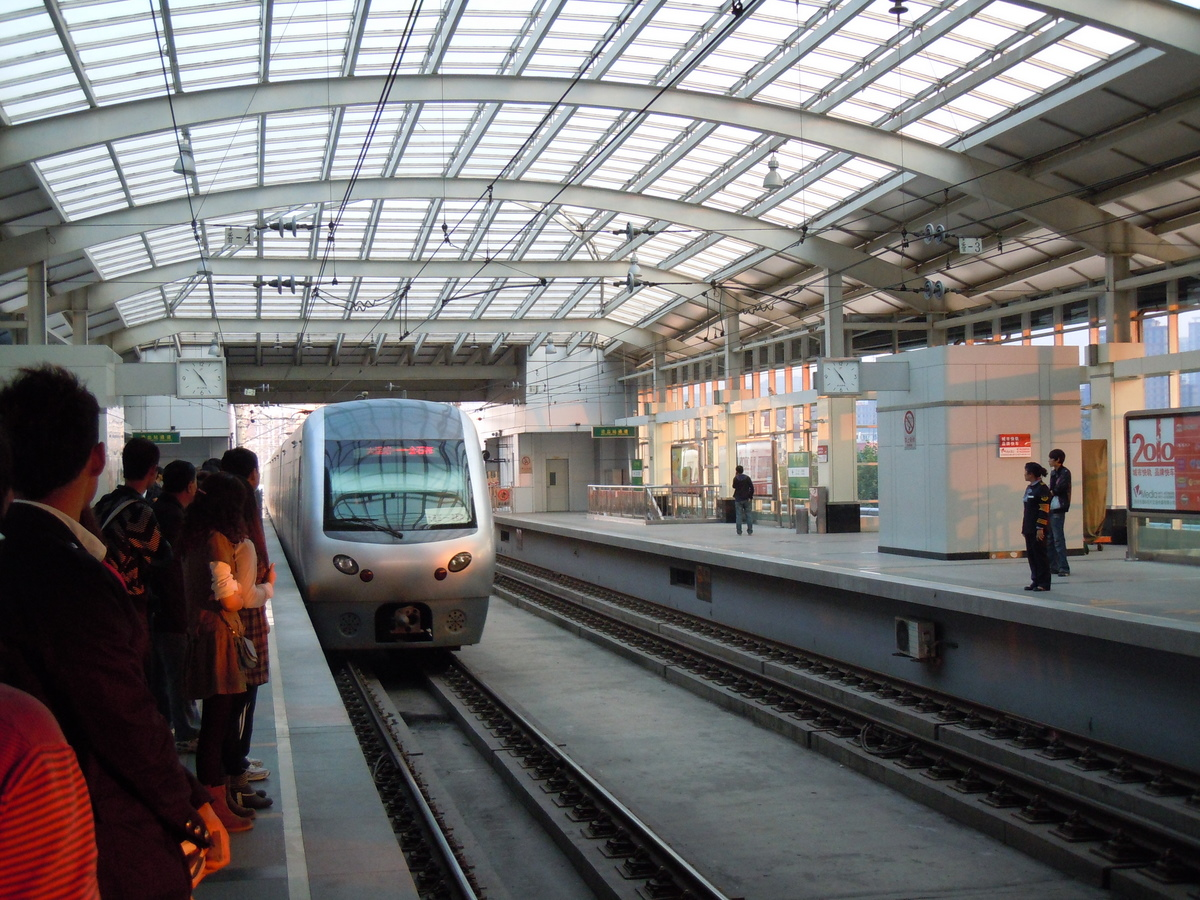
Metro platforms at Dalian railway station

The station opened in 1903. The new station was constructed and moved to the current location in 1937. Its design was by Sotaro Ota (太田宗太郎) and others of the Construction Section of the Regional Department of Southern Manchurian Railway.

== See also ==
- Russian Dalian
- Chinese Eastern Railway
- South Manchuria Railway
- Lüshun railway station
- Trams in Dalian
- Line 3 (Dalian Metro)
- Line 5 (Dalian Metro)
