= Beijing–Harbin high-speed railway =

Chinese railway corridor

- China Railway High-speed
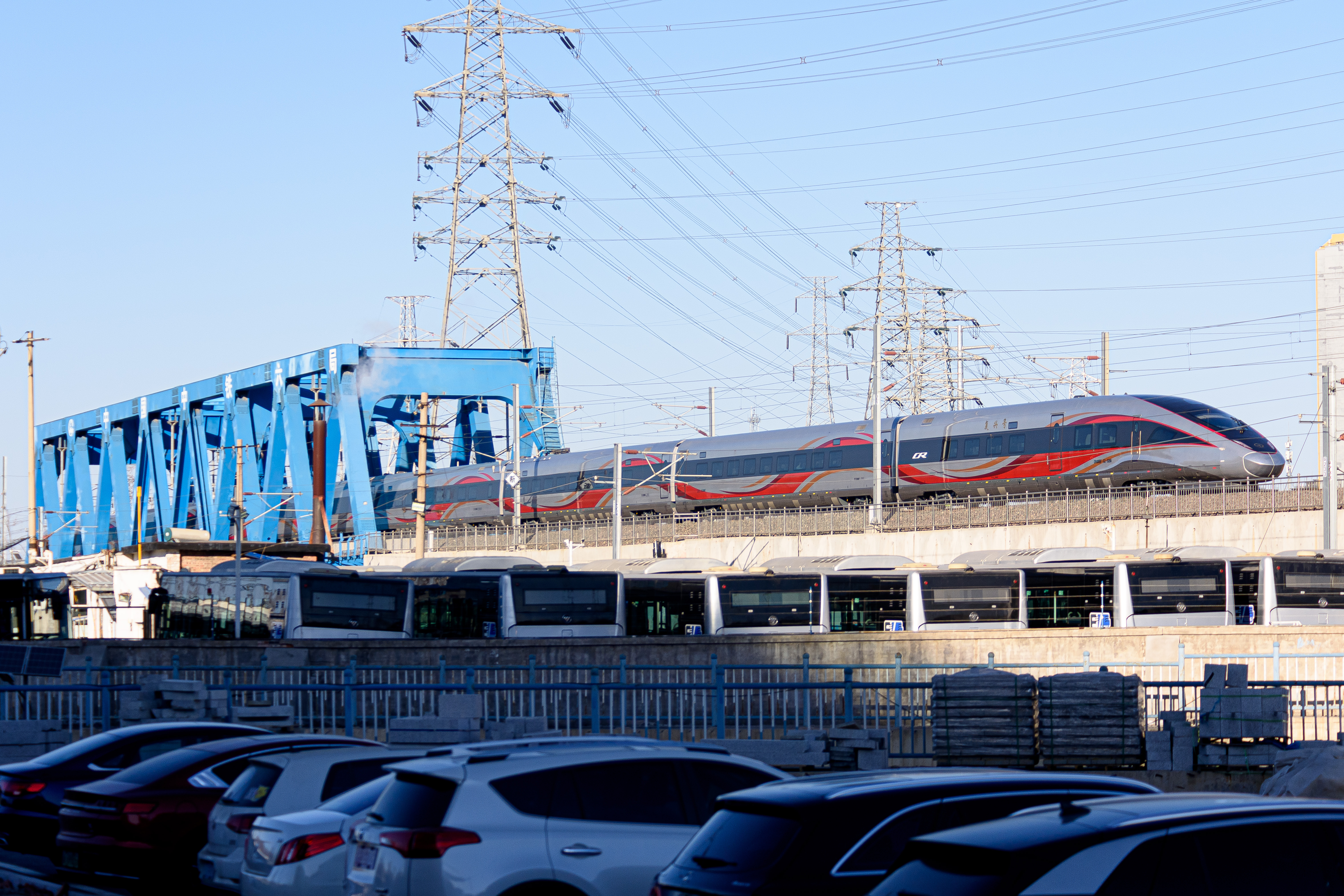
- A CR400BF-GZ of China Railway Harbin Group operating on Beijing-Harbin HSR as G951 from Beijing Chaoyang to Harbin West on 22 January 2024, the 3rd anniversary date of this line

Overview
- Native name: 京哈高速铁路 京哈高速线
- Owner: CR Beijing; CR Shenyang; CR Harbin
- Locale: Beijing; Hebei province; Liaoning province; Jilin province; Heilongjiang province
- Termini: Beijing Chaoyang; Harbin / Dalian
- Stations: 37

Service
- Type: High-speed rail
- Operator(s): China Railway High-speed
- Depot(s): Beijing, Shenyang, Changchun, Dalian, Harbin
- Rolling stock: TBD: CRH380B series

History
- Opened: January 22, 2021

Technical
- Line length: 1,700 km (1,100 mi)
- Track gauge: 1,435 mm (4 ft 8 1/2 in) standard gauge
- Electrification: 25 kV 50 Hz AC (Overhead line)
- Operating speed: 350 km/h (220 mph)
Route map
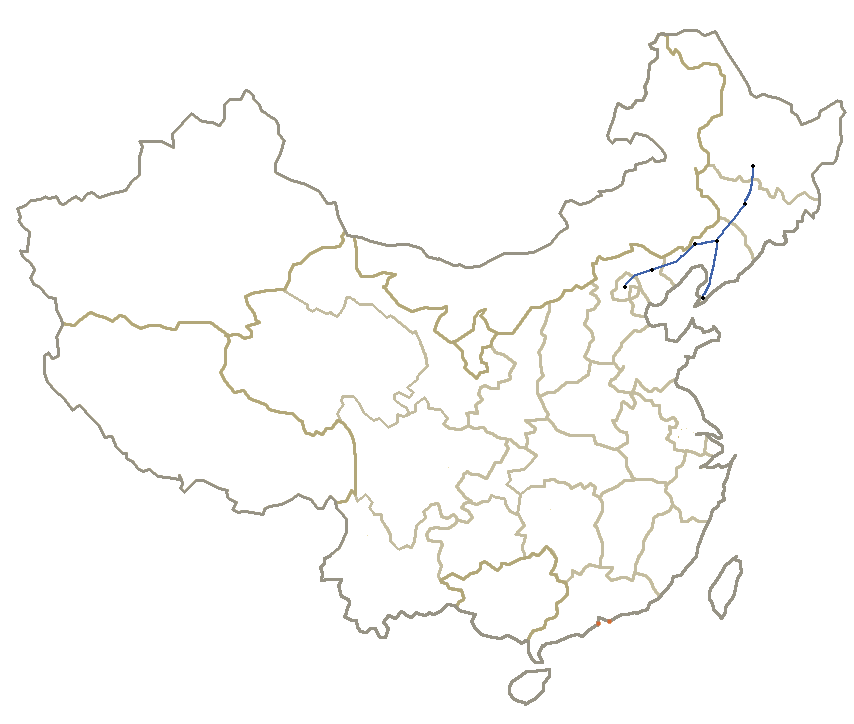

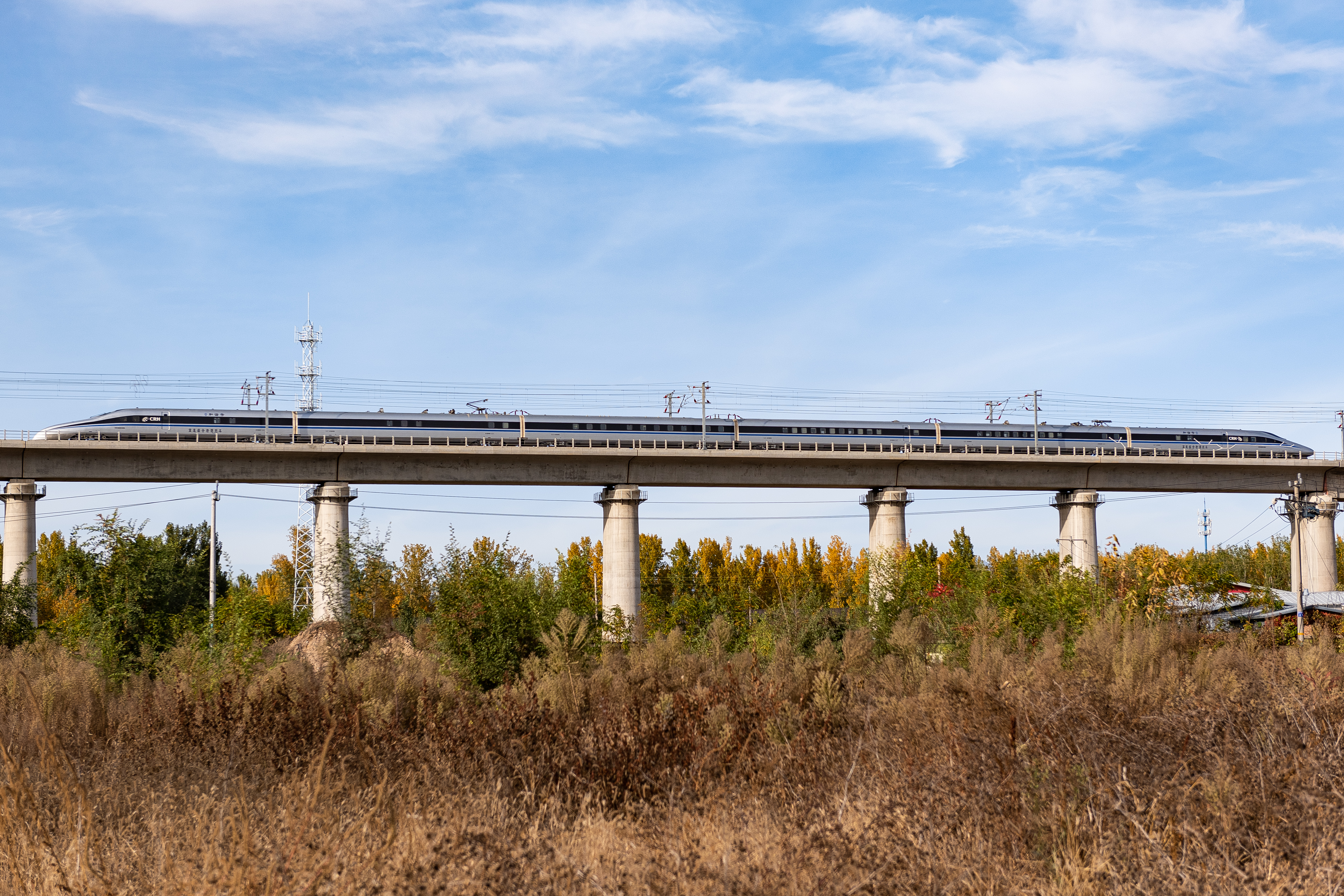
CRH380AM performing a test run on the Beijing–Chengde section in Beinianfeng Village, Yangsong Town, Huairou District, Beijing in October 2020

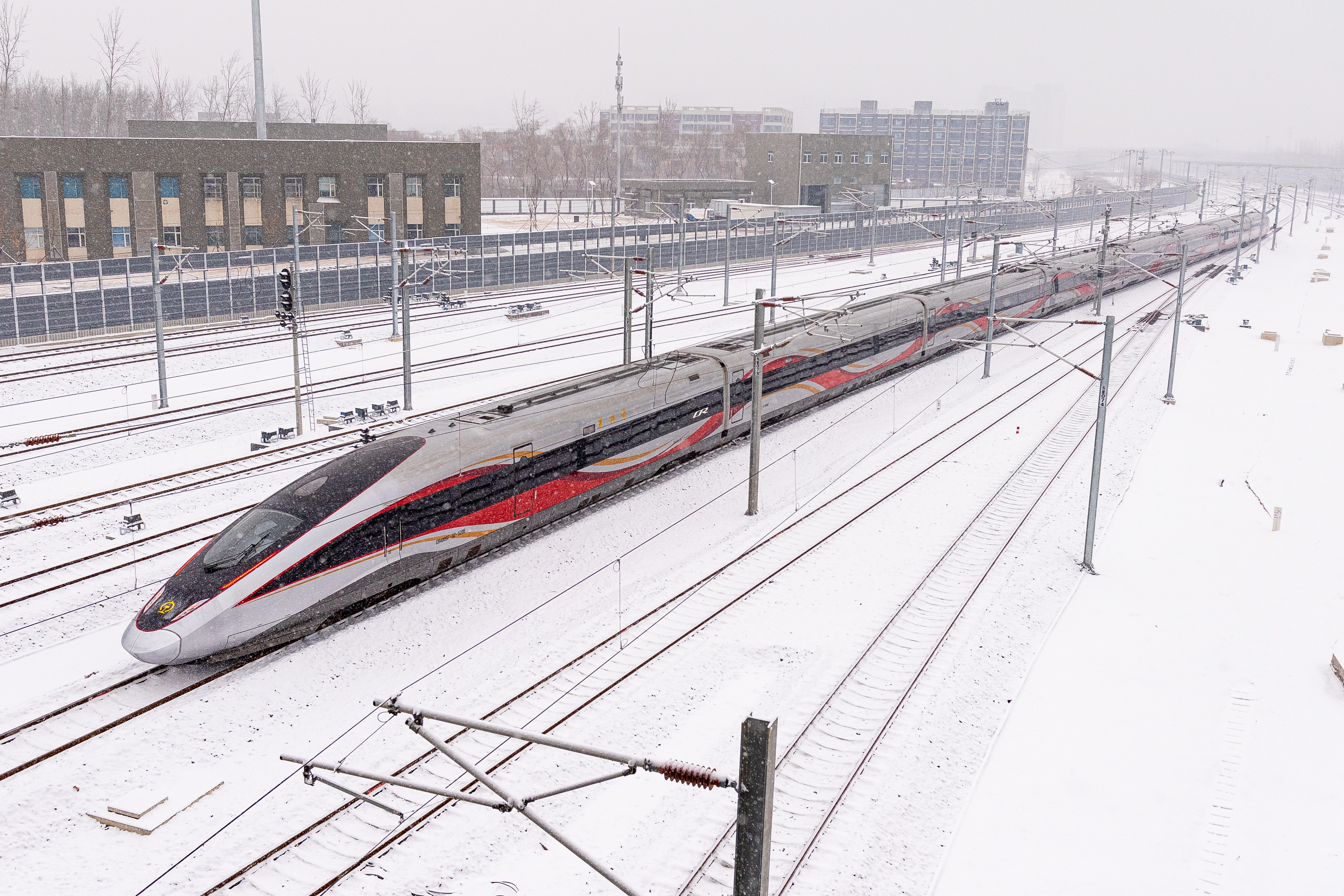
A CR400BF-GZ departing from Beijing Chaoyang railway station in snow as G901 to Harbin West in February 2022

The Beijing–Harbin high-speed railway (simplified Chinese: 京哈客运专线; traditional Chinese: 京哈客運專線; pinyin: Jīng-Hā Kèyùn Zhuān Xiàn) is an operational high-speed railway corridor, announced in 2008 as part of the "Four Verticals and Four Horizontals" master railway network plan. It is part of the CRH's system of passenger dedicated lines, connecting Beijing Chaoyang railway station in Beijing and Harbin railway station in Harbin.

The line is part of the Harbin–Hong Kong (Macau) corridor, and is 1,700 km (1,100 mi) long. The distance between Beijing and Harbin in 1,198 km (744 mi) after opening of this section in Jan 2022. It comprises the sections: Harbin–Dalian high-speed railway, the Beijing–Shenyang high-speed railway, and the Panjin–Yingkou high-speed railway.

== Components ==
The main route of the Beijing–Harbin high-speed railway begins as the Beijing–Shenyang high-speed railway to the city of Shenyang. At Shenyang, the main route continues as part of the Harbin–Dalian high-speed railway, which travels from Harbin to Dalian via Shenyang. The remaining section of the Harbin–Dalian high-speed railway between Shenyang and Dalian serves as a branch route to Dalian as well as Yingkou, which is one of the termini of the Panjin–Yingkou high-speed railway. Here the Panjin–Yingkou high-speed railway is a short branch to the city of Panjin. At Panjin, the railway connects to the Qinhuangdao–Shenyang high-speed railway, which is part of the Beijing–Harbin Railway.

Section	Description	Designed speed (km/h)	Length (km)	Construction start date	Open date
Beijing–Harbin high-speed railway	HSR Corridor of Northeast China, consisting of the Beijing-Shenyang & Harbin-Dalian and the Panjin-Yingkou spur.	350	1700	2007-08-23	2021-01-22
Beijing–Shenyang section (Beijing–Shenyang high-speed railway)	HSR from Beijing to Shenyang via Chengde, Fuxin and Chaoyang	350	700	March 2014	2018-12-29 (Chengde South–Shenyang section); 2021-01-22 (Beijing Chaoyang–Chengde South section)
Harbin–Dalian section (Harbin–Dalian high-speed railway)	HSR from Harbin to Dalian via Shenyang & Changchun	350	904	2007-08-23	2012-12-01
Panjin–Yingkou section (Panjin–Yingkou high-speed railway)	Connects Yingkou on Harbin–Dalian HSR with Panjin on Qinhuangdao-Shenyang HSR	350	89	2009-05-31	2013-09-12

== Station list ==
=== Harbin–Dalian section ===
Station	Chinese	Distance (km)	Prefecture-level city	Province	Metro transfers
Harbin	哈尔滨		Harbin	Heilongjiang	
Harbin West	哈尔滨西		Harbin	Heilongjiang	3
Shuangcheng North	双城北		Harbin	Heilongjiang	
Fuyu North	扶余北		Songyuan	Jilin	
Dehui West	德惠西		Changchun	Jilin	
Changchun	长春		Changchun	Jilin	1 3 4
Changchun West	长春西		Changchun	Jilin	2
Gongzhuling South	公主岭南		Siping	Jilin	
Siping East	四平东		Siping	Jilin	
Changtu West	昌图西		Tieling	Jilin	
Kaiyuan West	开原西		Tieling	Jilin	
Tieling West	铁岭西		Tieling	Jilin	
Shenyang North	沈阳北		Shenyang	Liaoning	metro 2
Shenyang	沈阳		Shenyang	Liaoning	metro 1
Liaoyang	辽阳		Liaoyang	Liaoning	
Anshan West	鞍山西		Anshan	Liaoning	
Haicheng West	海城西		Anshan	Liaoning	
Yingkou East	营口东		Yingkou	Liaoning	
Gaizhou West	盖州西		Yingkou	Liaoning	
Bayuquan	鲅鱼圈		Yingkou	Liaoning	
Wafangdian West	瓦房店西		Dalian	Liaoning	
Jinpu	金普		Dalian	Liaoning	
Dalian North	大连北		Dalian	Liaoning	METRO 1
Dalian	大连		Dalian	Liaoning	METRO 3

=== Beijing–Shenyang section ===
Station	Chinese	Distance (km)	Prefecture-level city	Province/ Municipality	Metro transfers
Beijing (Note: Since June 25, 2021.)	北京		N/A	Beijing	2
Beijing Chaoyang	北京朝阳		N/A	Beijing	3
Shunyi West	顺义西		N/A	Beijing	
Huairou South	怀柔南		N/A	Beijing	
Miyun	密云		N/A	Beijing	
Xinglongxian West	兴隆县西		Chengde	Hebei	
Anjiang	安匠		Chengde	Hebei	
Chengde South	承德南		Chengde	Hebei	
Chengdexian North	承德县北		Chengde	Hebei	
Pingquan North	平泉北		Chengde	Hebei	
Niuheliang	牛河梁		Chaoyang	Liaoning	
Kazuo	喀左		Chaoyang	Liaoning	
Nailingao	奈林皋		Chaoyang	Liaoning	
Liaoning Chaoyang	辽宁朝阳		Chaoyang	Liaoning	
Beipiao	北票		Chaoyang	Liaoning	
Wulanmutu	乌兰木图		Fuxin	Liaoning	
Fuxin	阜新		Fuxin	Liaoning	
Heishan North	黑山北		Jinzhou	Liaoning	
Xinmin North	新民北		Shenyang	Liaoning	
Shenyang West	沈阳西		Shenyang	Liaoning	
Shenyang	沈阳		Shenyang	Liaoning	metro 1
