= Liaoyang (disambiguation) =

Liaoyang can refer to:

- Liaoyang city
- Liaoyang County
- Liaoyang province during the Yuan dynasty
- Liaoyang Railway Station
- Liaoyang TV
