= Harbin–Dalian high-speed railway =

Chinese high-speed rail corridor

Beijing–Harbin high-speed railway Harbin–Dalian Section
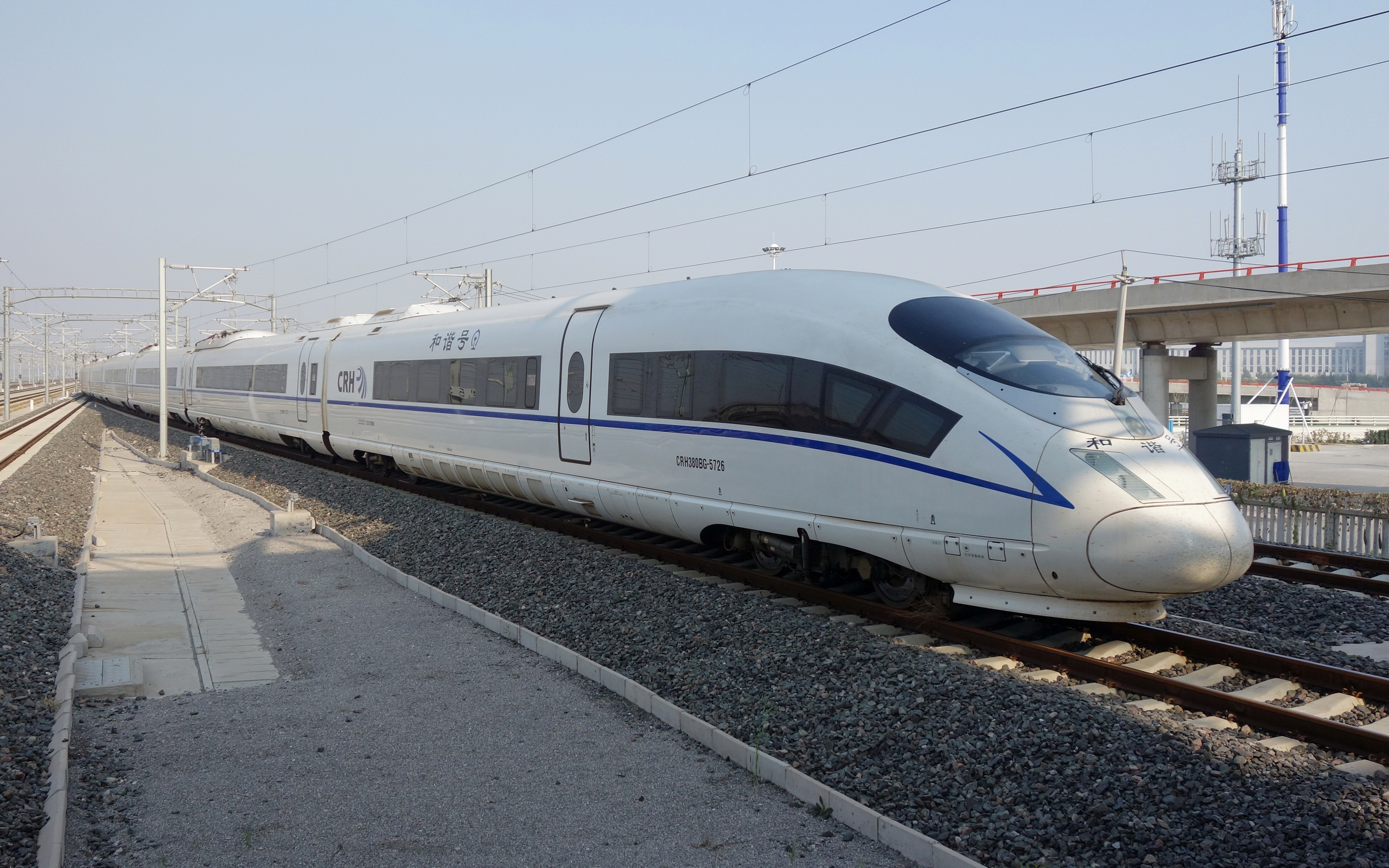

Overview
- Native name: 京哈高速铁路哈大段
- Status: Operational
- Owner: China Railway
- Locale: Heilongjiang province; Jilin province; Liaoning province
- Termini: Harbin West; Dalian North
- Stations: 23

Service
- Type: High-speed rail
- System: China Railway High-speed
- Operators: CR Harbin; CR Shenyang
- Rolling stock: CRH380BG

History
- Opened: December 1, 2012; 13 years ago

Technical
- Line length: 904 km (562 mi)
- Num of tracks: 2 (Double-track)
- Track gauge: 1,435 mm (4 ft 8 1/2 in) standard gauge
- Minimum radius: 7,000 m (23,000 ft)
- Electrification: 25 kV 50 Hz AC (Overhead line)
- Operating speed: 350 km/h (217 mph) (design); 300 km/h (186 mph) (operational); 310 km/h (193 mph) (ATP)
Route map

The Harbin–Dalian high-speed railway or Hada High-Speed Railway (Chinese: 哈大高速铁路; pinyin: Hādà Gāosù Tiělù) is a high-speed rail line connecting Harbin, Heilongjiang and Dalian, Liaoning. The line is the world's first alpine high-speed railway operating at high latitudes and low temperatures in winter. The trains can continue operating even with snow on the line and the tracks are fitted with de-icing technology. The project cost CN¥95 billion, which was 25% more than the original budget. The first commercial services began operating in December 1, 2012. At the time of completion, the railway was the northernmost high-speed line in China.

== History ==
Construction work began on August 23, 2007. The climate of Northeast China poses a challenge to the design; parts of the line had to be rebuilt before the opening due to deformation caused by frost heaving. Test runs along the entire railway started on October 8, 2012. Eventually, it was decided that the route could be opened for commercial services on December 1, 2012, nearly one year behind schedule. On opening day the first commercial passenger services started with two trains leaving simultaneously, one from Dalian and the other from the new Harbin West station. During the first 52 days of operation, the line transported 2.856 million passengers.

Upon opening, during winters (December through March) the line operates on a winter timetable, with the maximum running speed of 250 km/h (160 mph). In summer, the service runs an expanded timetable with services running at a higher speed of up to 350 km/h (220 mph). However, the line has a design speed of up to 350 km/h (220 mph). Under the winter timetable, the 921 km (572 mi) journey from Dalian to Harbin takes five hours eighteen minutes. In summer, the higher speeds reduce the journey time to just three and a half hours. The summer high-speed services also have higher ticket prices than the slower winter service.

The line operates 67 pairs of trains. By the end of March, there had been 9.4 million passenger trips on the line, an average of 78,000 per day. During the four weeks of the Chinese spring festival, passengers reached peaks of 164,000 per day.

Testing of services at the increased summer speed of 350 km/h (220 mph) began in April 2013 after a delay of one month. Commercial services on the summer schedule began on the April 21st, 2013. Starting December 1, 2015, the Harbin-Dalian High-Speed Railway implemented a unified winter and summer operating schedule, operating at 300 km/h year-round. In 2017, The number of high-speed trains operating daily has increased to 110 pairs.

On December 1, 2022, the Harbin-Dalian High-speed Railway celebrated its 10th anniversary of operation. It has transported a total of 670 million passengers, operated 740,000 services, and traveled 671 million kilometers safely.

== Design ==
On opening the line used CRH380BG type alpine EMUs. These have been specially modified for the Hada railway which must cope with temperatures as low as −40 °C (−40 °F) in winter. Extra insulation has been added within the skin of the carriages and even the vacuum toilets have been modified to operate in this extreme cold. An August 15, 2016, the G8041 train, operated by a Fuxing EMU, departed from Dalian North Station and headed to Shenyang Station along the Harbin-Dalian High-Speed Railway. This was the first time that the Fuxing series EMU had carried passengers.

On June 25, 2021, with the expansion of the operating range of the Fuxing intelligent EMU, the CR400BF-GZ intelligent high-altitude EMU was put into operation on the Shenyang-Harbin section of the Harbin-Dalian High-speed Railway.

On January 1, 2025, the CR400BF-GS an upgraded intelligent EMU began operation on the Shenyang-Dalian high-speed line, serving multiple train services such as G8048 between Shenyang and Dalian.

The track has also been specially designed to cope with extremes in temperature. In winter, the temperatures on the route can fall to −40 °C (−40 °F) while in summer they can reach 40 °C (104 °F). This large change in temperature can cause frost heave. As the water in the ground freezes in winter, it expands. In summer the ice melts and water drains causing shrinkage. This creates distortion on the ground surface that ordinary high speed railway lines could not cope with. To combat frost heave, 70% of the line is constructed above the ground surface on viaducts. During construction, about 20 percent of the track that had been built directly on the ground had to be redesigned and rebuilt due to frost damage. This delayed the opening of the line by about a year.

== Stations ==
Station Name	Chinese	Metro transfers/connections
Harbin		1
Harbin West		3
Shuangcheng North
Fuyu North
Dehui West
Changchun West		Changchun Rail Transit: 2
Gongzhuling South
Siping East
Changtu West
Kaiyuan West
Tieling West
Shenyang North		Shenyang Metro: 2
Shenyang		Shenyang Metro: 1
Shenyang South		
Liaoyang
Anshan West
Haicheng West
Yingkou East
Gaizhou West
Bayuquan
Wafangdian West
Jinpu
Dalian North		1 2
Dalian		3 5

== See also ==
- Asia Express
- South Manchuria Railway, about the early history of the railways in the same corridor
- Beijing–Harbin high-speed railway
- Beijing–Shenyang high-speed railway
- Panjin–Yingkou high-speed railway
