= LYT =

LYT may refer to:

- LYT, the National Rail station code for Lymington Town railway station, Hampshire, England
- LYT, the Telegraph code for Liaoyang railway station, Liaoning, China
