= Dalian North railway station =

Railway station in Dalian, China

Dalianbei 大连北 1 2
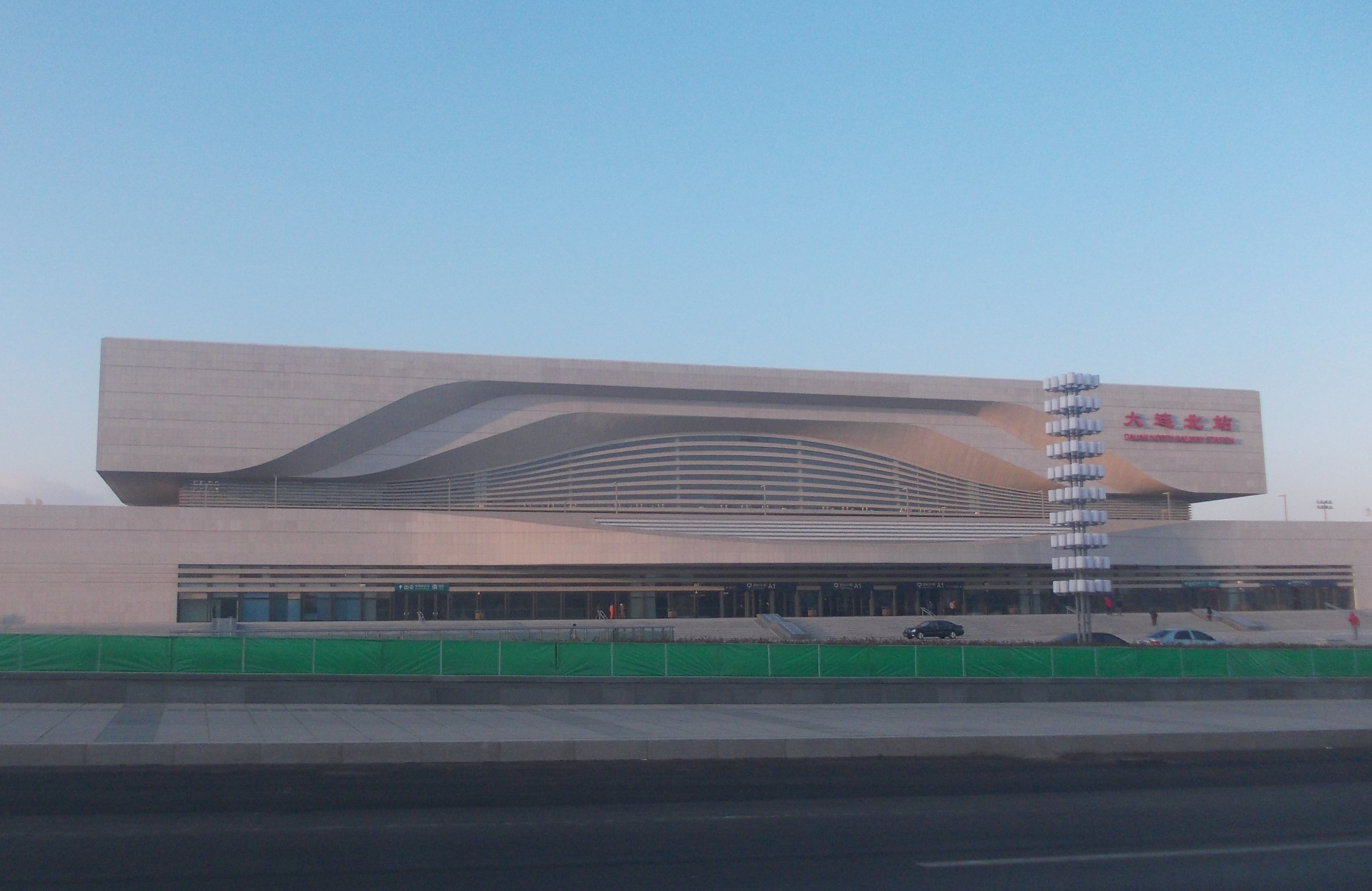
- External view of Dalian North railway station

General information
- Other names: Dalian North, Dalianbei
- Location: Ganjingzi District, Dalian, Liaoning; China
- Coordinates: 39°00′55″N 121°36′10″E
- Operated by: China Railway High-speed, China Railway Corporation
- Lines: CRH Lines: Beijing–Harbin, Harbin–Dalian; Dandong–Dalian intercity railway Dalian Metro 1 2

Other information
- Station code: TMIS code: 53520; Telegraph code: DFT; Pinyin code: DLB
- Classification: 1st class station

Services
Preceding station	China Railway High-speed	Following station
Jinpu towards Harbin	Harbin–Dalian high-speed railway Part of the Beijing–Harbin High-Speed Railway	Dalian Terminus

Metro
Preceding station	Dalian Metro	Following station
Huabei Road towards Hekou	Line 1	Yaojia Terminus
Nanguanling towards Haizhiyun	Line 2	Terminus
Location

Dalianbei (Dalian North) railway station is a railway station of the Harbin–Dalian section of the Beijing–Harbin High-Speed Railway. It is located in Dalian, in the Liaoning province of China. Construction of the station started on April 1, 2010 and the station opened to regular rail traffic in late 2012. On December 1, 2012, the station started to receive high-speed rail traffic as part of the newly opened Harbin–Dalian High-Speed Railway.

The station cost 1.54 billion yuan to construct. The main building contains 68,500 square metres (737,000 sq ft) of space. There is a 74,000 square metres (800,000 sq ft) weather shed. Ten platforms of some 63,000 square metres (680,000 sq ft) serve twenty rail lines and can accommodate a maximum of 7,500 passengers. Passengers are transported around the station using 56 escalators, 26 elevators and two bridge approaches.

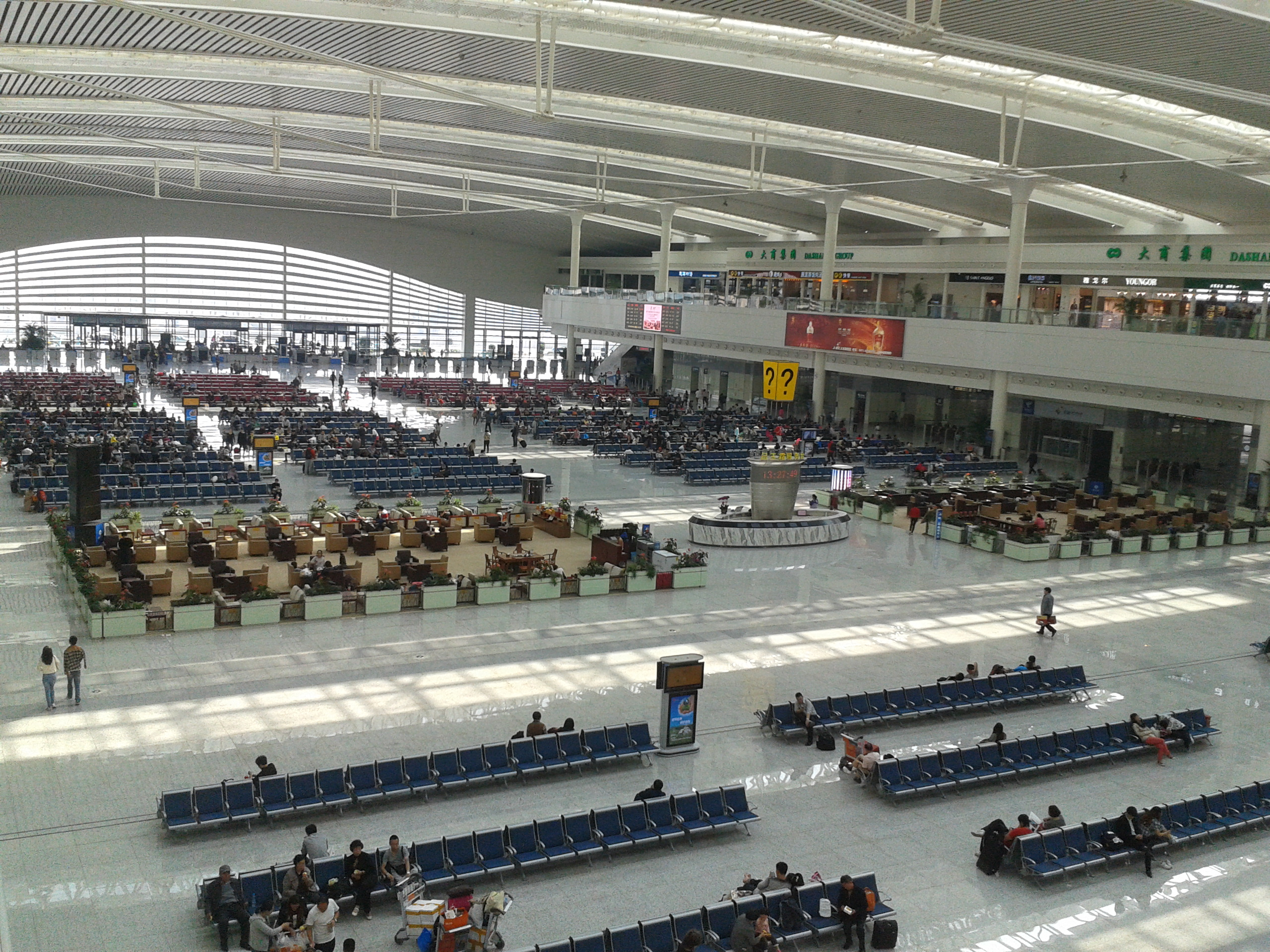
Station concourse

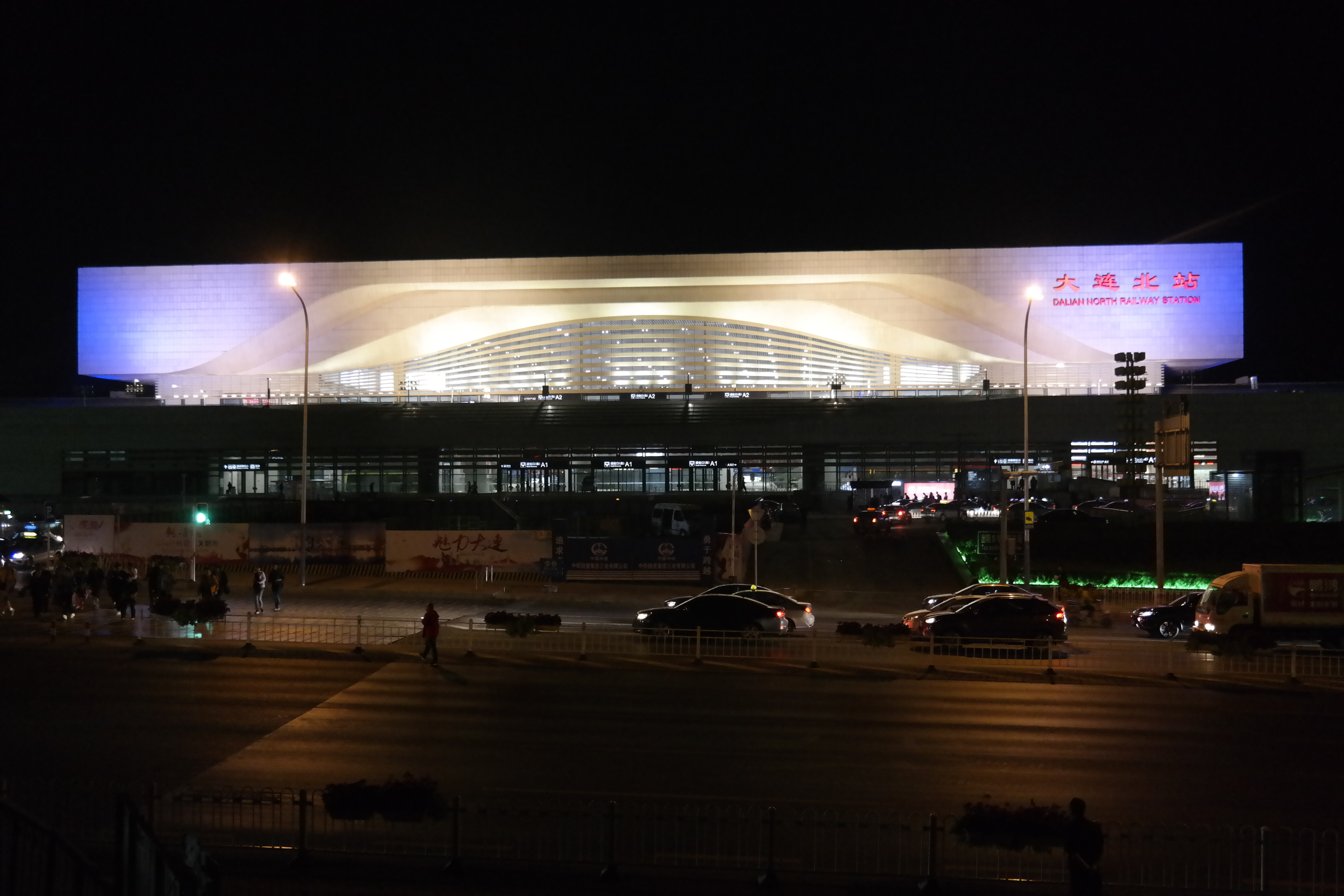
Dalian North railway station at night

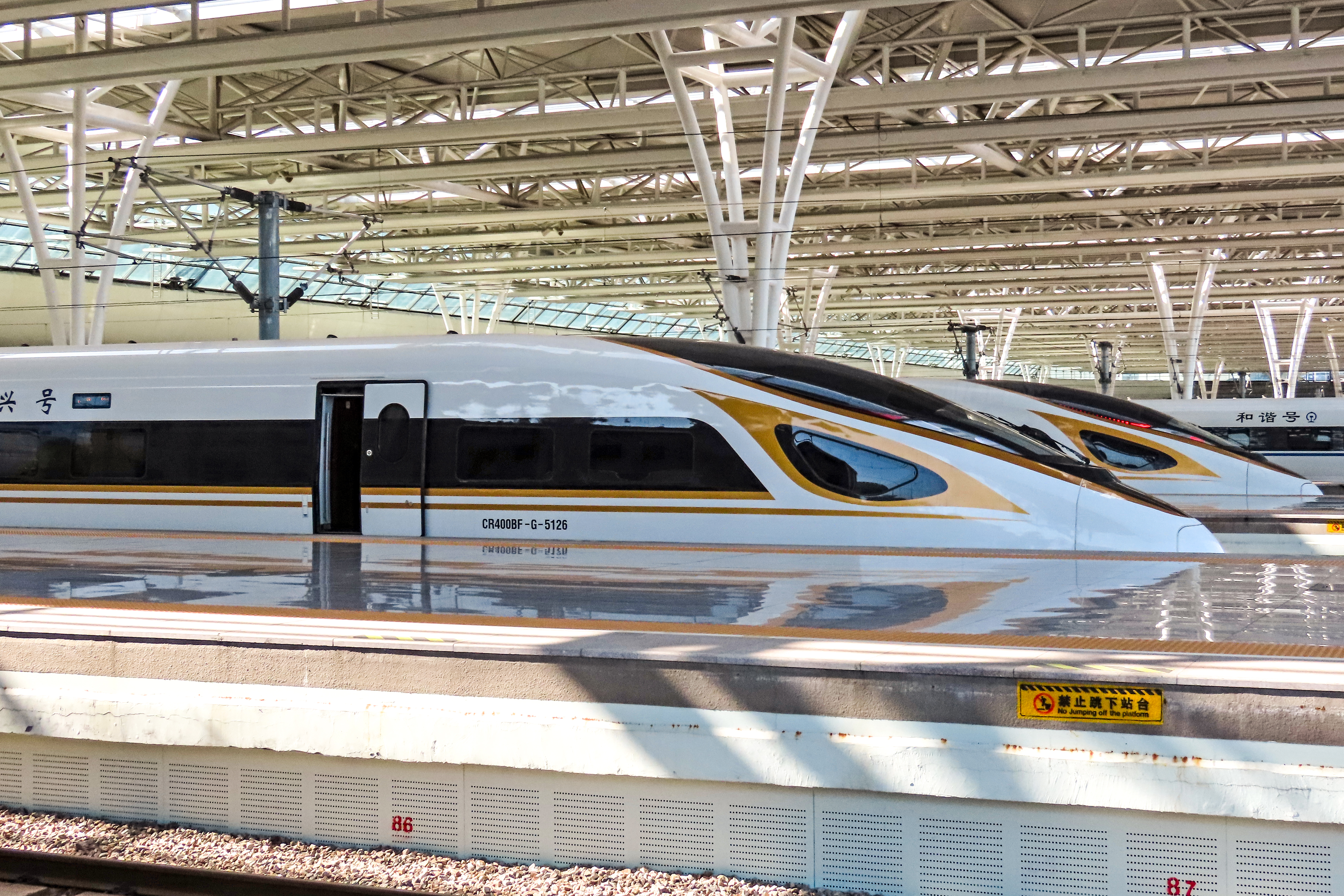
CR400BF-G at Dalian North railway station

== See also ==
- Beijing–Harbin High-Speed Railway
- Harbin–Dalian High-Speed Railway
- Panjin–Yingkou High-Speed Railway
- Chinese Eastern Railway
- South Manchuria Railway
- South Manchuria Railway Zone
- Changchun Light Rail Transit
