= Gongzhuling South railway station =

Railway station in China

Gongzhulingnan 公主岭南
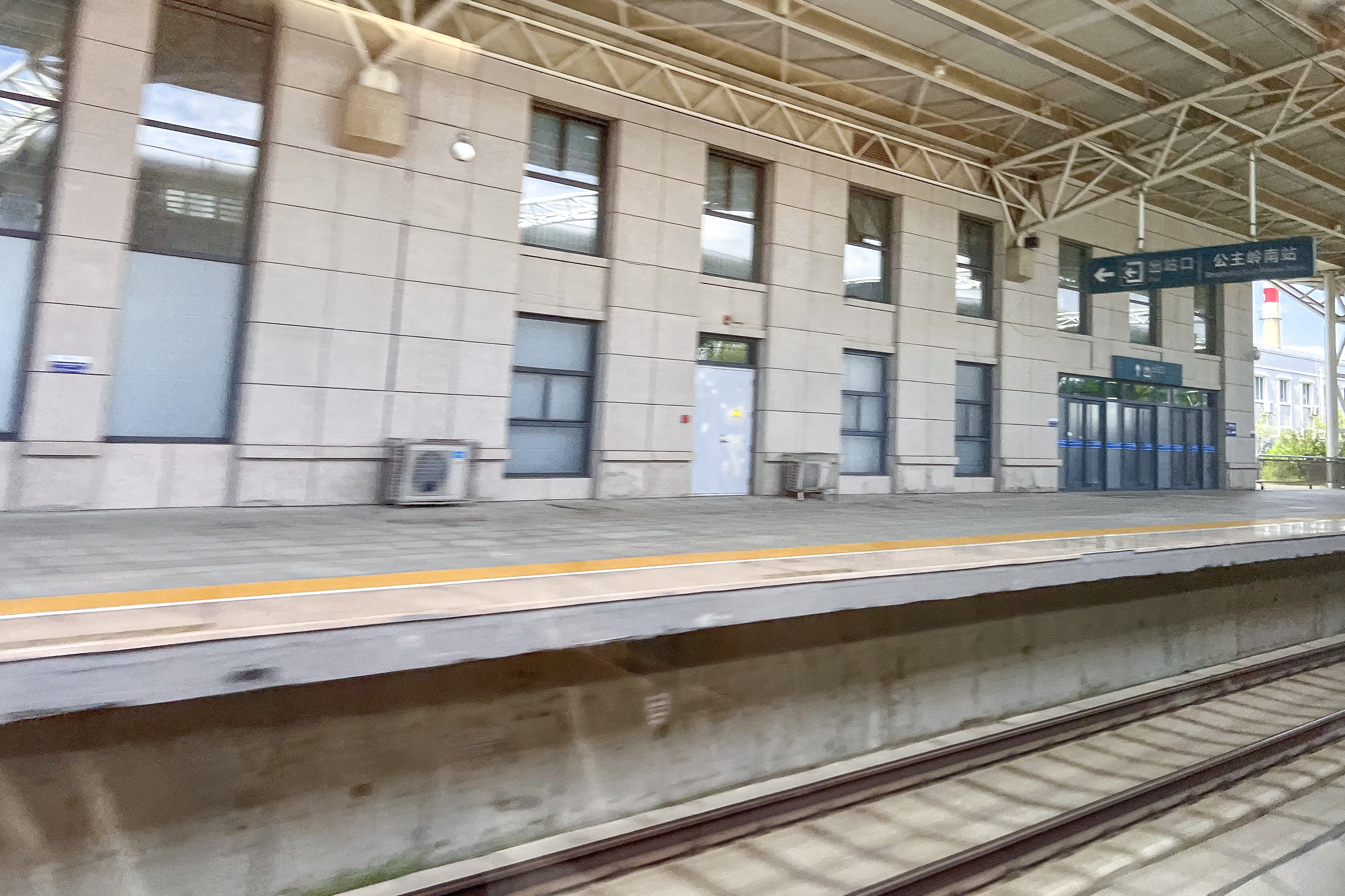

General information
- Other names: Gongzhuling South
- Location: Gongzhuling, Jilin; China
- Coordinates: 43°28′15″N 124°48′35″E
- Operator: China Railway High-speed, China Railway Corporation
- Lines: Beijing–Harbin, Harbin–Dalian

Other information
- Station code: TMIS code: 53484; Telegraph code: GBT; Pinyin code: GZN
Location

Gongzhuling South railway station is a railway station on the Harbin–Dalian section of the Beijing–Harbin High-Speed Railway. It is in Gongzhuling, Jilin province, China.

== See also ==
- Chinese Eastern Railway
- South Manchuria Railway
- South Manchuria Railway Zone

Preceding station	China Railway High-speed	Following station
Changchun West towards Harbin	Harbin–Dalian high-speed railway Part of the Beijing–Harbin High-Speed Railway	Siping East towards Dalian
