= Fuyu North railway station =

Railway station in China

Coordinates: 45.0060°N 125.9979°E

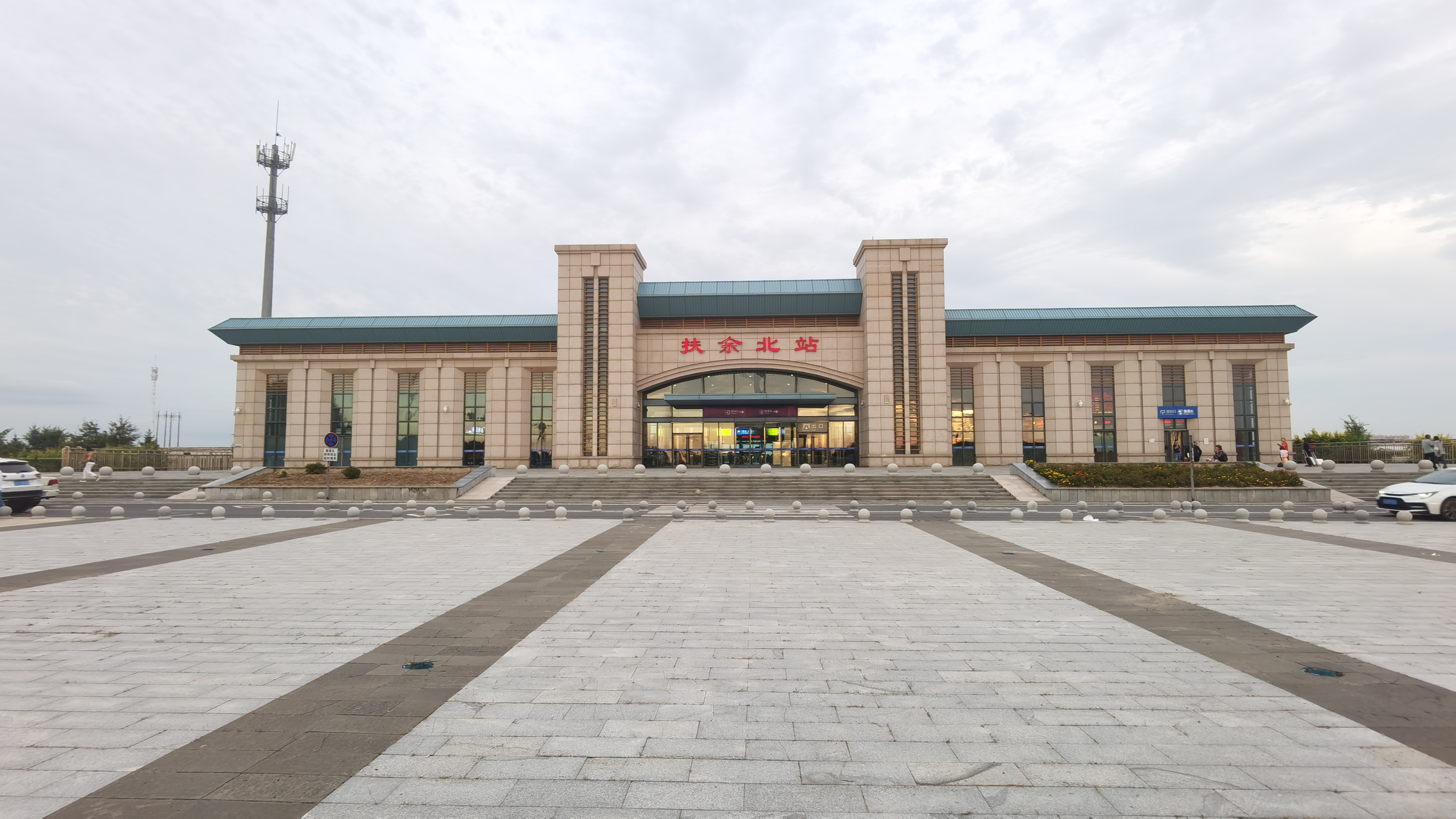
Fuyu North railway station in 2023

Fuyu North railway station is a railway station along the Harbin-Dalian high-speed railway. It is located in Fuyu, Jilin, China.

Preceding station	China Railway High-speed	Following station
Shuangcheng North towards Harbin	Harbin–Dalian high-speed railway Part of the Beijing–Harbin High-Speed Railway	Dehui West towards Dalian
