= Byt =

Byt or BYT may refer to:

- BYuT Yulia Tymoshenko Bloc, a Ukrainian political coalition
- "Byt" ("The Flat"), a short 1968 film by Jan Švankmajer
- BYT, the Indian Railways station code for Bhatapara railway station, Chhattisgarh, India
- BYT, the Telegraph code for Bayuquan railway station, Liaoning, China
- byt, the ISO 639-3 code for Berti language, an extinct Saharan language of Sudan
