= Tieling West railway station =

Railway station in China

Tielingxi 铁岭西
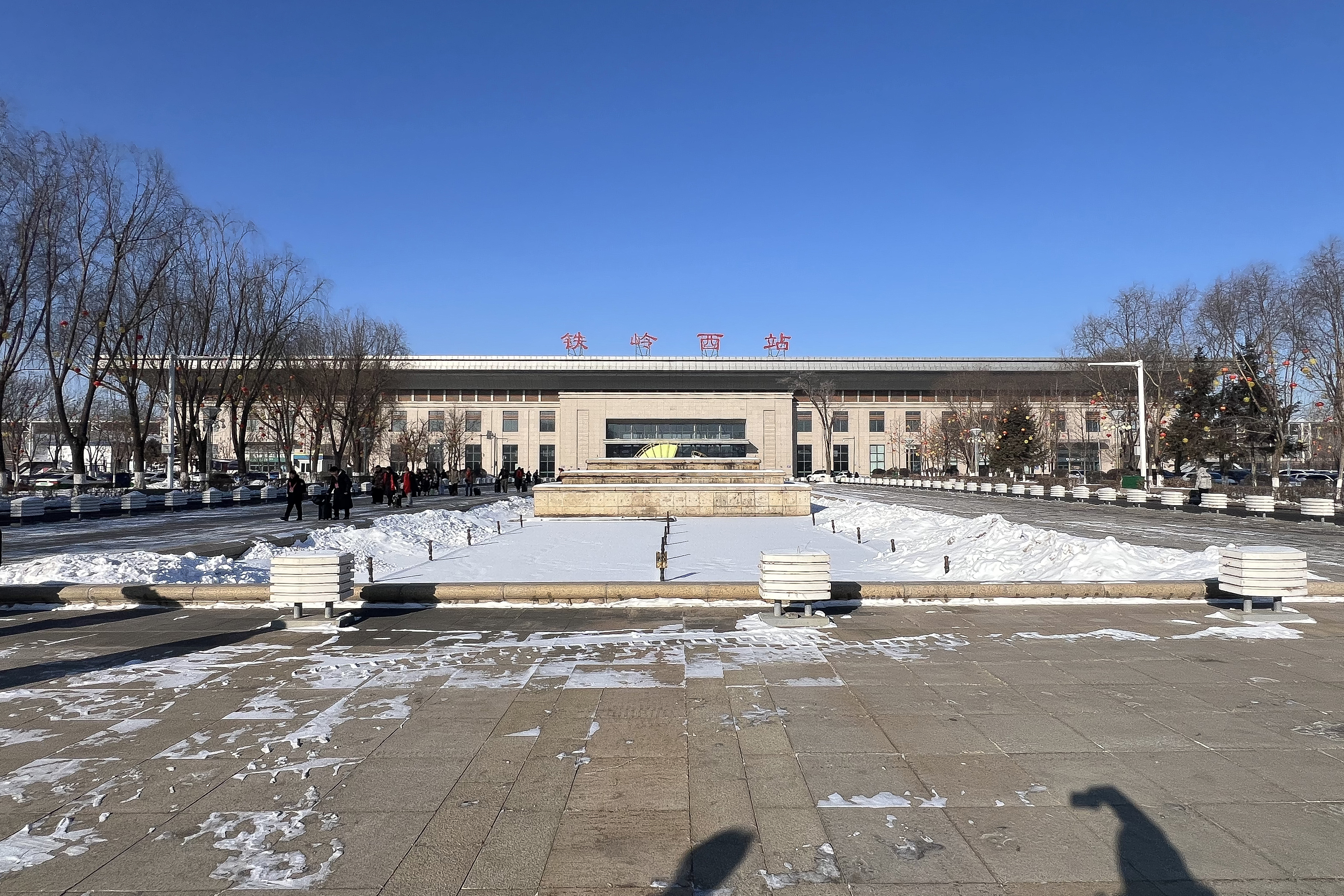

General information
- Other names: Tieling West
- Location: Yangweilou Village, Fanhe, Tieling County, Tieling, Liaoning; China
- Coordinates: 42°13′51″N 123°39′58″E
- Operated by: China Railway High-speed, China Railway Corporation
- Lines: Beijing–Harbin, Harbin–Dalian

Other information
- Station code: TMIS code: 53496; Telegraph code: PXT; Pinyin code: TLX

History
- Opened: December 1, 2012
Location

Tieling West railway station (IATA: TTV) is a railway station on the Harbin–Dalian section of the Beijing–Harbin high-speed railway. It is in Fanhe Town, Tieling, Liaoning province, China. It opened along with the Harbin–Dalian high-speed railway on 1 December 2012.

== See also ==
- Tieling railway station
- Chinese Eastern Railway
- South Manchuria Railway
- South Manchuria Railway Zone
- Changchun Light Rail Transit

Preceding station	China Railway High-speed	Following station
Kaiyuan West towards Harbin	Harbin–Dalian high-speed railway Part of the Beijing–Harbin High-Speed Railway	Shenyang North towards Dalian
