= GZX =

GZX may refer to:

- GZX, Pinyin code for Gaizhou West railway station, China
- GZX, division code for Guangzong County, China
- GZX, radio call sign for Admiralty wireless station, origin of "Guzz" nickname for HMNB Devonport, England
