= Dalian transport network =

Dalian is a major city and seaport in the south of Liaoning Province, People's Republic of China. It is the southernmost city of Northeast China and China's northernmost warm water port, at the tip of the Liaodong Peninsula. Today, it is becoming a financial, shipping and logistics center for Northeast Asia. Dalian has comprehensive network of roads, railways and a major airport.

== Road Network ==
=== Expressways ===
Four expressways link Dalian to its neighbor cities and areas, they are:

- Shenda Expressway (G15)
- Hegang–Dalian Expressway (G11)
- Tuyang Expressway
- Dayaowan Expressway

=== China National Highways ===
There are two China National Highways starts/ends at Dalian.

- China National Highway 201 (Hegang-Mudan River-Lüshun)
- China National Highway 202 (Heihe-Shenyang-Lüshun)

== Urban Public Transportation ==
=== Dalian Metro ===
The Dalian Metro or Dalian Rapid Transit is an elevated rapid transit system in the city of Dalian, China[3] (as of 2014, Dalian does not have a fully underground subway system). The metro opened on 1 May 2003. The system currently in operation consists of 3 lines: Line 3, Line 7, and Line 8.

=== Dalian Subway ===
The conception of building Dalian's Subway dates back to 1980s. In 1987, the plan was officially submitted for approval but failed. It was not until 2002 that its first line, line 3 was completed and operated. Currently, there are four lines - line 1, 2, 3 and 12 are in service. Line 4, 5 and 13 are under construction. In future, the city will all together have 12 subway lines.

=== Trams in Dalian ===
Trams in Dalian have been operating continuously since 1909 making them one of the oldest tram systems still in use in China. There were once eleven routes in operation in Dalian in the Northeast China. Only two routes remain in use today. Notably, all of the staff on Dalian's tram system are female, i.e. – driver, conductor, points man — even the depot manager. The tram system was the only rail network in the city, until Dalian Metro opened more than a decade ago; the Metro has a large ridership.

=== Public Bus ===
The public bus transport in Dalian is highly developed. Over 150 routes enable budget visitors to get around the city easily. The buses' operating times vary, starting between 4:30am and 6:30am and finishing between 8pm and midnight. Make sure of the operating hours when taking a bus. Most buses have no conductors and so one or two Yuan in change will be needed before getting aboard. There are many one-way streets in the city, so do not always take it for granted that the return will drop people on the same street. People in the city are very kind to foreigners, so ask locals for help. There are three well-preserved old tram routes from colonial times in the city. Luckily they still serve as an important means of transport. The antique red trolleys of 201, 202 and 203 cruise the downtown and southwestern areas in the city. Buses with the initial number 6 are suburban commuters. The flexible mini-buses usually cruise the lanes and corners of the city, and can be flagged one down at anywhere. The ticket price is two yuan.

== Taxis ==
The city area of Dalian is not very large and a taxi would be a good choice for travelers who want to quickly see the city. The rates start from eight yuan for the first three kilometers (1.86 miles) with 1.8 yuan per additional kilometer (0.62 miles). Rates for the night service from 22:00 - 05:00 (next day) are 30% higher, starting at 10.4 yuan for the first three kilometers (1.86 miles) and 2.34 yuan for each additional kilometer.

== Intercity Transportation ==
=== Air ===
Dalian has an international airport called Zhoushuizi International Airport. It is located in Ganjingzi District, about 10 km (6 mi) northwest of the city center. In 2014 the airport handled 17,203,640 passengers, making it the busiest airport in Northeast China and the 16th busiest nationwide. The airport is the hub for Dalian Airlines and a focus city for China Southern Airlines and Hainan Airlines.

=== Port ===
Dalian is a very busy port with ships traveling between Dalian and Yantai, Weihai, Penglai, Qinhuang islands, port of Tianjin, and Changhai County. High-speed tourist ships between Dalian and Yantai, Qinhuang islands and Changhai County have been added. There are also passenger ships that travel between Dalian port and Incheon, South Korea.

=== Trains ===
Dalian railway is connected with the railway network of Northeast China and North China. Everyday more than 50 trains leave Dalian for Beijing, Shenyang, Harbin and many other cities. The Liaosheng Evening Paper Express and the Golden Beach Express travels between Dalian and Shengyang. There are also air-conditioned express trains that travel between Dalian and Beijing, Changchun, and Harbin. Dalian railway station, the terminal of Hada railway, is situated in Qingniwa Bridge of downtown Dalian. The station offers ticket delivery service.

Dalian has now two main train stations, Dalian and North Dalian.
