= Siping East railway station =

High-speed railway station in Jilin province, China

Sipingdong 四平东
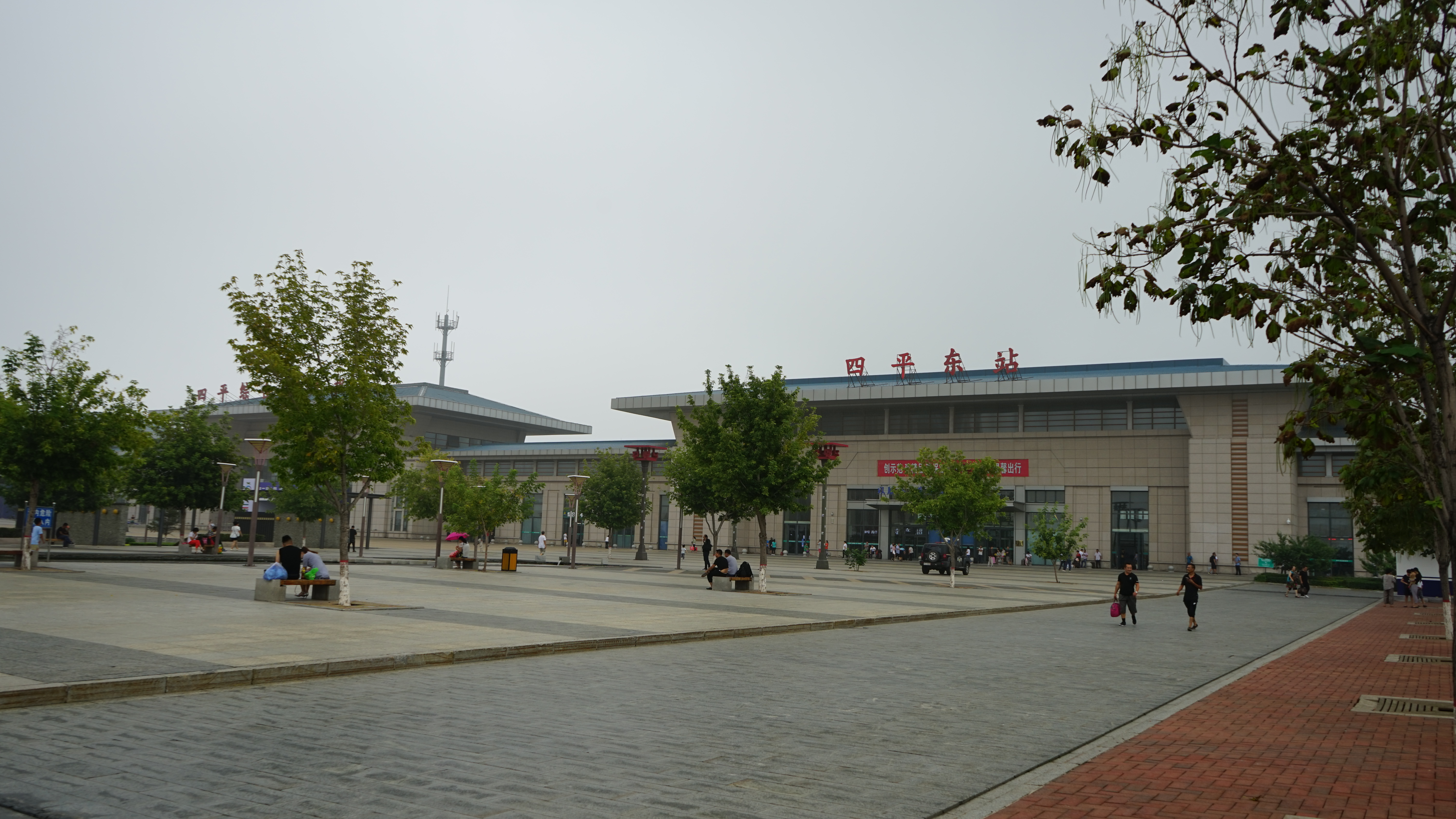
- Siping East railway station

General information
- Other names: Siping East
- Location: Siping, Jilin; China
- Coordinates: 43°08′08″N 124°25′59″E
- Operator: China Railway High-speed, China Railway Corporation
- Lines: Beijing–Harbin, Harbin–Dalian
Location

Siping East railway station (IATA: OSQ) is a railway station on the Harbin–Dalian section of the Beijing–Harbin High-Speed Railway. It is in Siping, Jilin province, China. It is one of two railway stations in the city, the other being Siping railway station.

== See also ==
- Chinese Eastern Railway
- South Manchuria Railway
- South Manchuria Railway Zone
- Changchun Light Rail Transit

Preceding station	China Railway High-speed	Following station
Gongzhuling South towards Harbin	Harbin–Dalian high-speed railway Part of the Beijing–Harbin High-Speed Railway	Changtu West towards Dalian
