= YDD =

YDD may refer to:

- Yankee Doodle Dandy, a 1942 American biographical musical film
- Yiddish, the ISO 639 code ydd
- South Yemeni dinar, the ISO 4217 code YDD
- Yingkou East railway station, the IATA code YDD
