= Harbin West railway station =

Railway station in China

Harbinxi 哈尔滨西
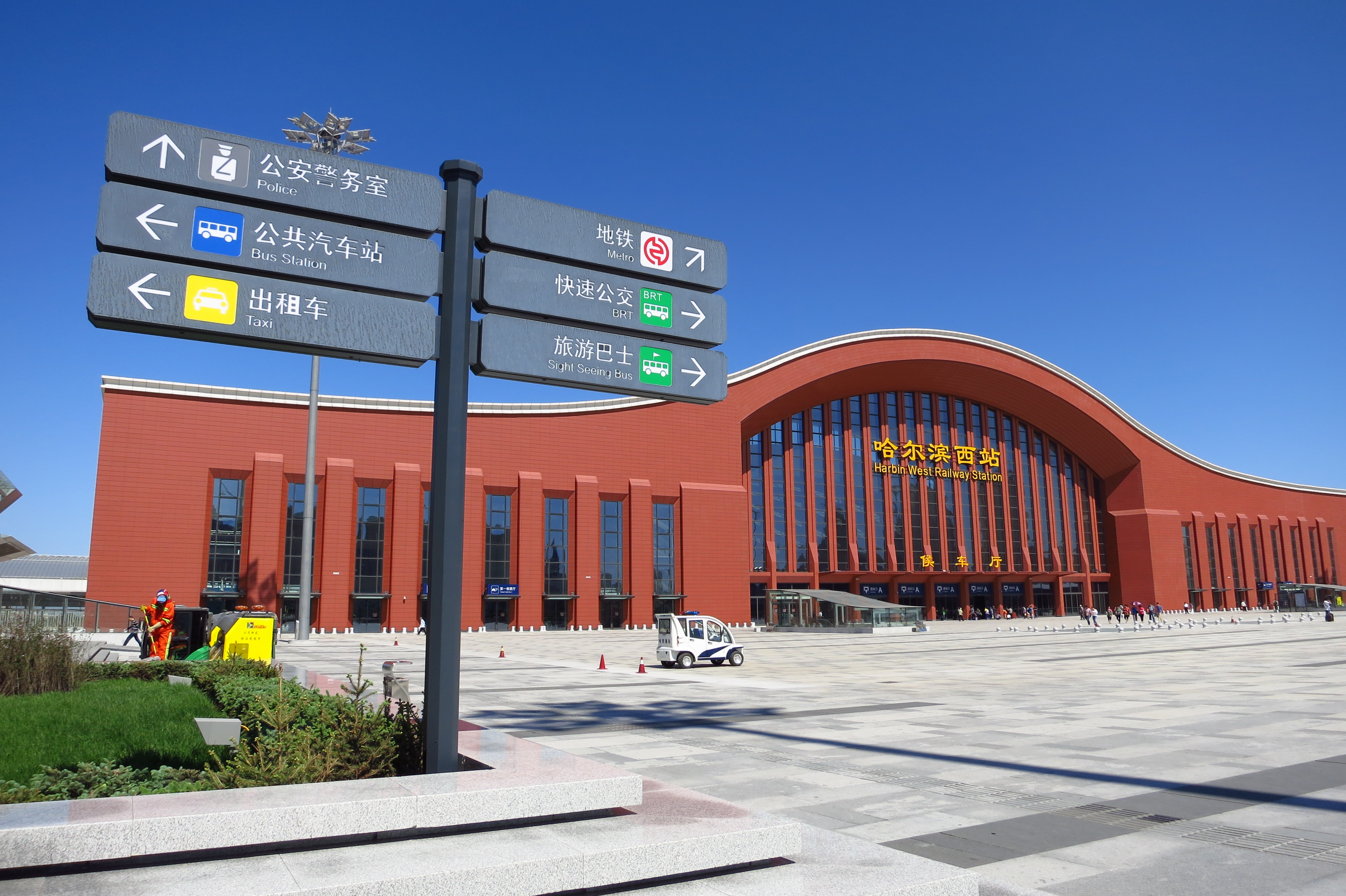
- Harbin West railway station

General information
- Other names: Harbin West
- Location: Nangang District, Harbin, Heilongjiang; China
- Coordinates: 45°42′17″N 126°34′23″E
- Operated by: China Railway High-speed, China Railway Corporation
- Lines: Beijing–Harbin, Harbin–Dalian, Harbin Metro line 3
- Platforms: 18

Other information
- Station code: TMIS code: 53469; Telegraph code: VAB; Pinyin code: HEX
- Classification: Top Class station

History
- Opened: 2012

Services
Preceding station	China Railway	Following station
Wanggang towards Beijing	Beijing–Harbin railway	Harbin Terminus
Preceding station	China Railway High-speed	Following station
Harbin Terminus	Harbin–Dalian high-speed railway Part of the Beijing–Harbin High-Speed Railway	Shuangcheng North towards Dalian
Location

Harbinxi (West) railway station is a railway station on the Jingha Railway and the Harbin–Dalian section of the Beijing–Harbin High-Speed Railway. It is located in Harbin, in the Heilongjiang province of China.

The station cost 7.01 billion yuan to construct. The main building contains 70,000 square metres (750,000 sq ft) of space. There is a 92,000-square-metre (990,000 sq ft) weather shed. Ten platforms of some 100,000 square metres (1,100,000 sq ft) serve 22 rail lines and can accommodate a maximum of 12,000 passengers.

== History ==
Construction of the station started on July 5, 2009, and the station opened to regular rail traffic in late 2012. On December 1, 2012, the station started to receive high-speed rail traffic as China unveiled its first high-speed rail running through regions with extremely low winter temperatures with scheduled runs from Harbin to Dalian. The weather-proof CRH380B bullet trains serving the line can accommodate temperatures from −40 °C (−40 °F) to 40 °C (104 °F). On December 10, 2014, the station started to receive conventional train service of the Jingha Railway. On August 17, 2015, the station started to receive high-speed CRH trains from Qiqihar as Harbin–Qiqihar Intercity Railway opened for public service.

== See also ==
- Chinese Eastern Railway
- South Manchuria Railway
- South Manchuria Railway Zone
