= Shuangcheng North railway station =

Railway station in China

Shuangchengbei 双城北
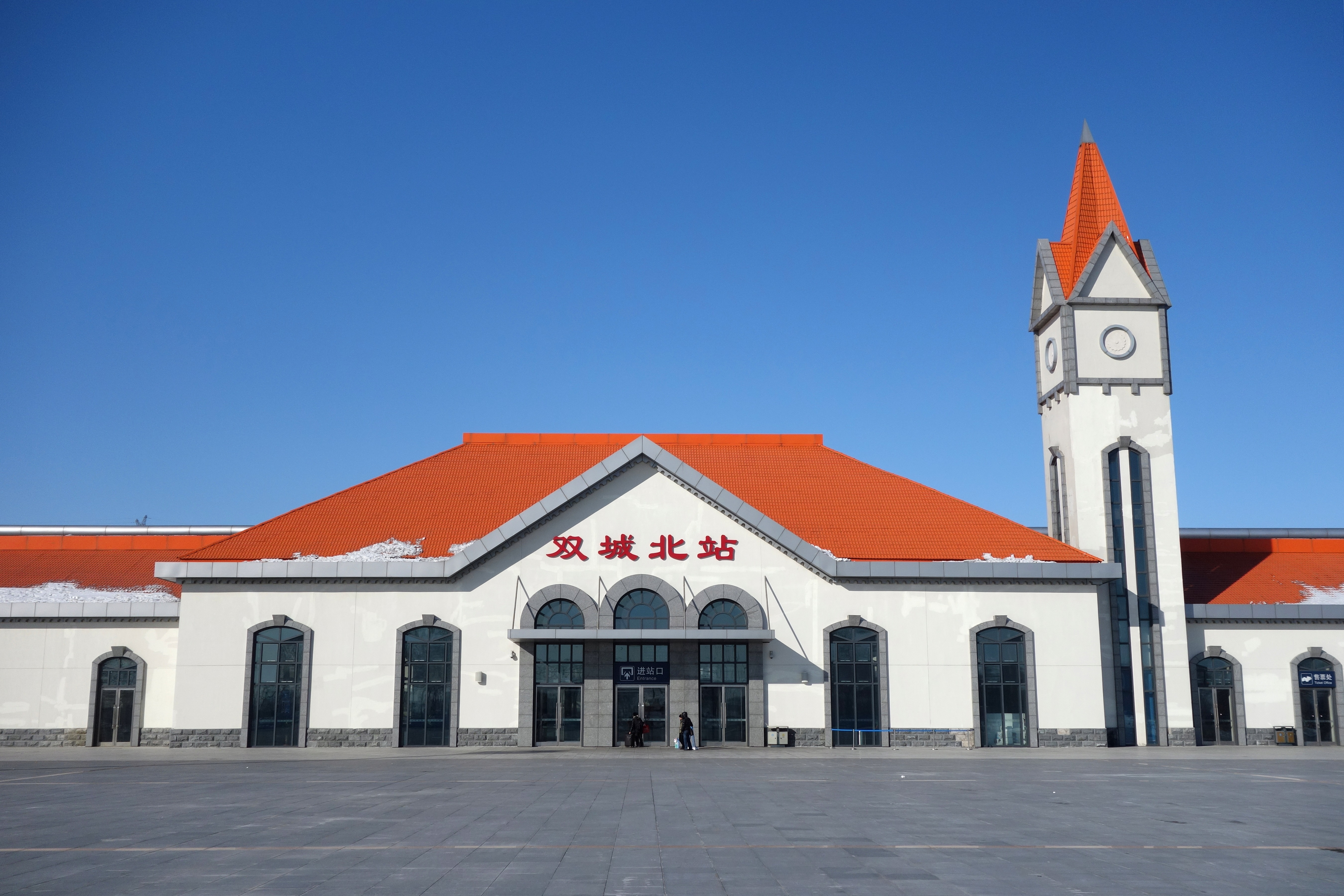
- Shuangcheng North railway station

General information
- Other names: Shuangcheng North
- Location: Harbin, Heilongjiang; China
- Coordinates: 45.4242°N 126.2649°E
- Operated by: China Railway High-speed, China Railway Corporation
- Lines: Beijing–Harbin, Harbin–Dalian
Location

Shuangcheng North station (双城北站) is a rail station on the Harbin–Dalian high-speed railway in Shuangcheng District, Harbin, China. The station building incorporates a European architectural style and has been in operation since 2012.

Preceding station	China Railway High-speed	Following station
Harbin West towards Harbin	Harbin–Dalian high-speed railway Part of the Beijing–Harbin High-Speed Railway	Fuyu North towards Dalian
