= Anshan railway station =

Railway station in Anshan, China

Anshan railway station 鞍山站
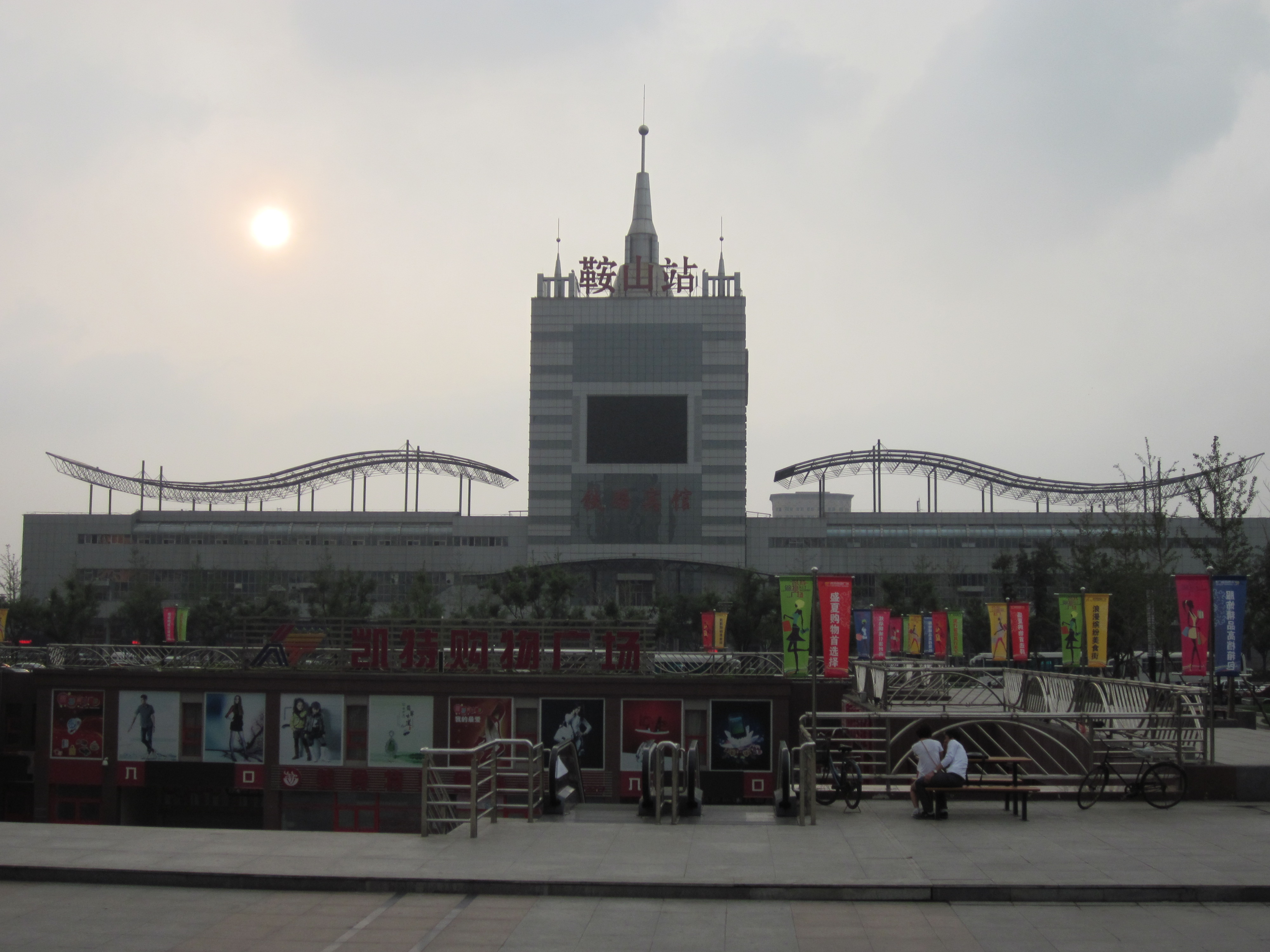
- Anshan Railway Station.

General information
- Location: Anshan, Liaoning; China
- Coordinates: 41°07′10″N 122°59′32″E
- Operated by: China Railway
- Line(s): Shenyang-Dalian, Harbin–Dalian

Other information
- Station code: Telegraph code: AST; Pinyin code: ASH
- Classification: 2nd class station

History
- Opened: 1918

Anshan railway station (Chinese: 鞍山站; pinyin: Ānshān Zhàn) is a railway station located in Anshan, Liaoning, China, on the Shenyang-Dalian and Harbin–Dalian lines, which are operated by China Railway.

== History ==
The Anshan railway station opened in 1918 and was initially called Anshan Yi (鞍山驿).

Preceding station	China Railway	Following station
Liaoyang towards Shenyang North	Shenyang–Dalian railway	Haicheng towards Dalian East
