= Haicheng West railway station =

Railway station in Anshan, China

Haicheng West 海城西
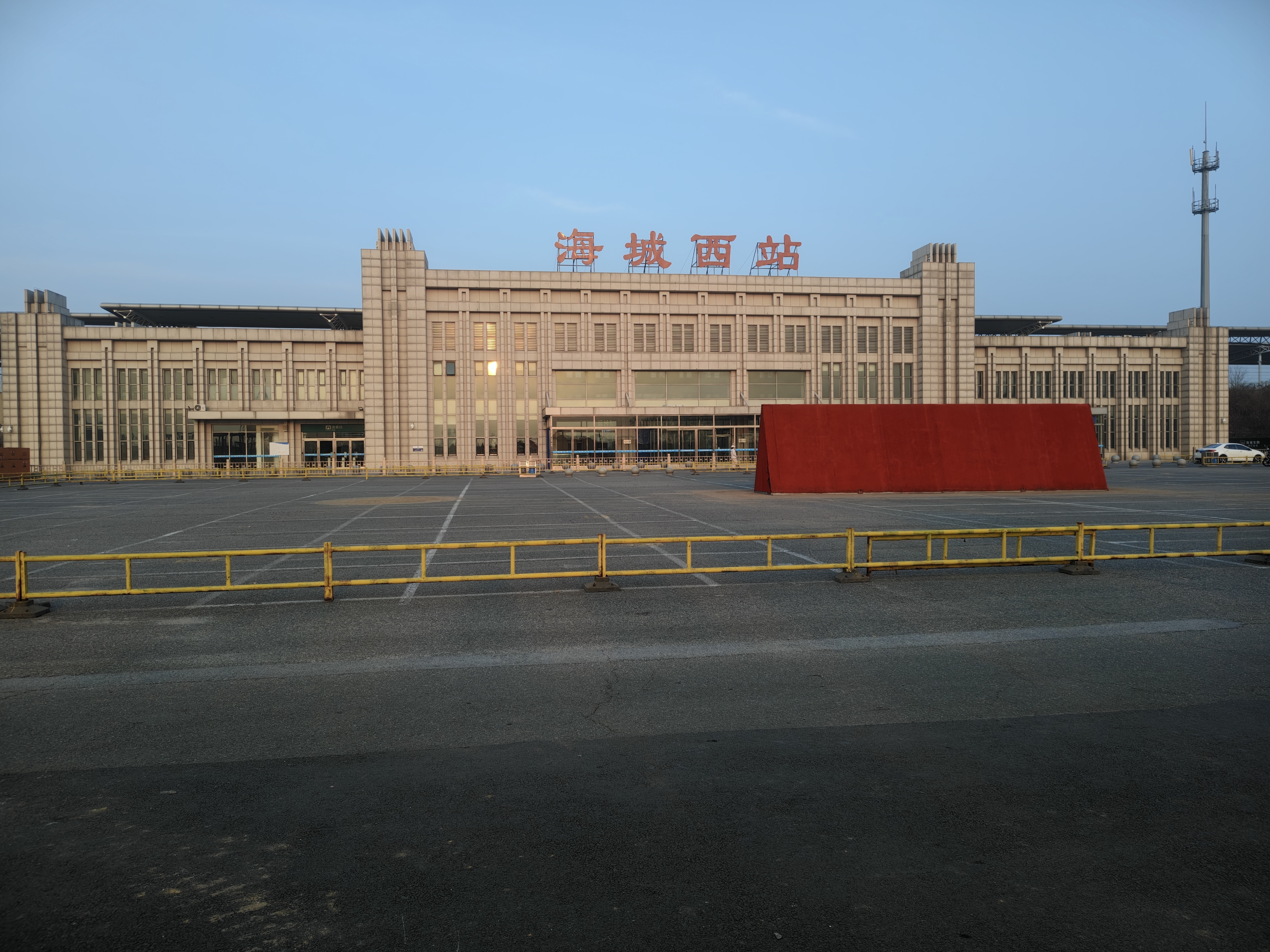

General information
- Location: Haicheng, Anshan, Liaoning; China
- Coordinates: 40.9129°N 122.6539°E
- Operated by: China Railway High-speed
- Line: Harbin–Dalian high-speed railway

Other information
- Station code: TMIS code: 53802; Telegraph code: HXT; Pinyin code: HCX

History
- Opened: December 1, 2012
Location

Haicheng West railway station (Chinese: 海城西站) is a railway station in Haicheng, Anshan, Liaoning, China. It opened along with the Harbin–Dalian high-speed railway on 1 December 2012.

Preceding station	China Railway High-speed	Following station
Anshan West towards Harbin	Harbin–Dalian high-speed railway	Yingkou East towards Dalian
Panjin towards Panjin North	Panjin–Yingkou high-speed railway	Terminus
