= Anshan West railway station =

Railway station in Anshan, China

Anshan West 鞍山西
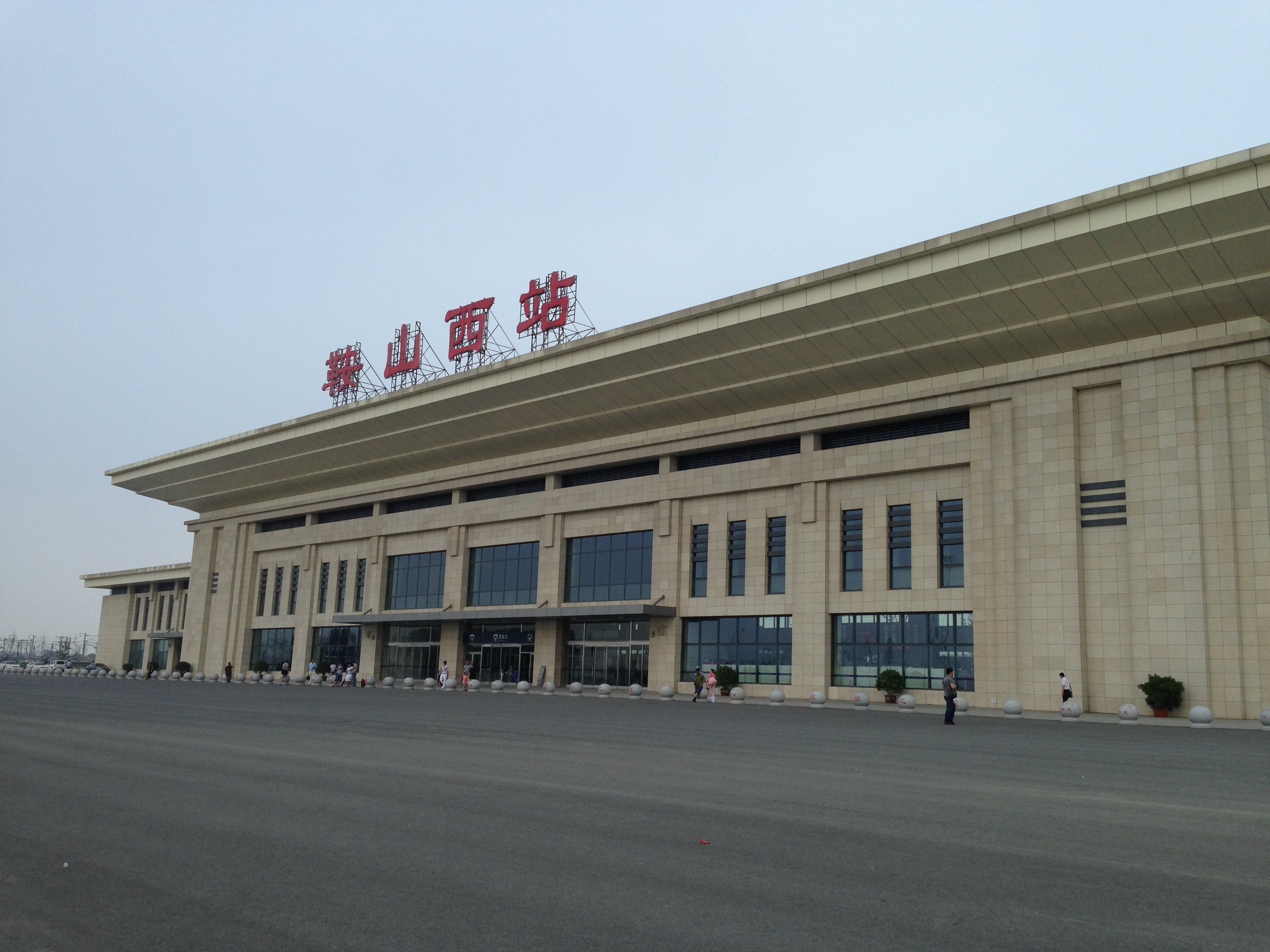
- Anshan West Railway Station

General information
- Other names: Anshan West
- Location: Tiexi District, Anshan, Liaoning; China
- Coordinates: 41°06′59″N 122°54′34″E
- Operated by: China Railway High-speed, China Railway Corporation
- Line: Harbin–Dalian high-speed railway

Other information
- Station code: TMIS code: 53499; Telegraph code: AXT; Pinyin code: ASX

History
- Opened: December 1, 2012
Location

Anshan West railway station (IATA: VBL) is a railway station in Anshan, Liaoning province, China. It opened along with the Harbin–Dalian high-speed railway on 1 December 2012.

== See also ==
- Chinese Eastern Railway
- South Manchuria Railway
- South Manchuria Railway Zone
- Changchun Light Rail Transit

Preceding station	China Railway High-speed	Following station
Liaoyang towards Harbin	Harbin–Dalian high-speed railway	Haicheng West towards Dalian
