= Changtu West railway station =

Railway station in China

Changtu West 昌图西
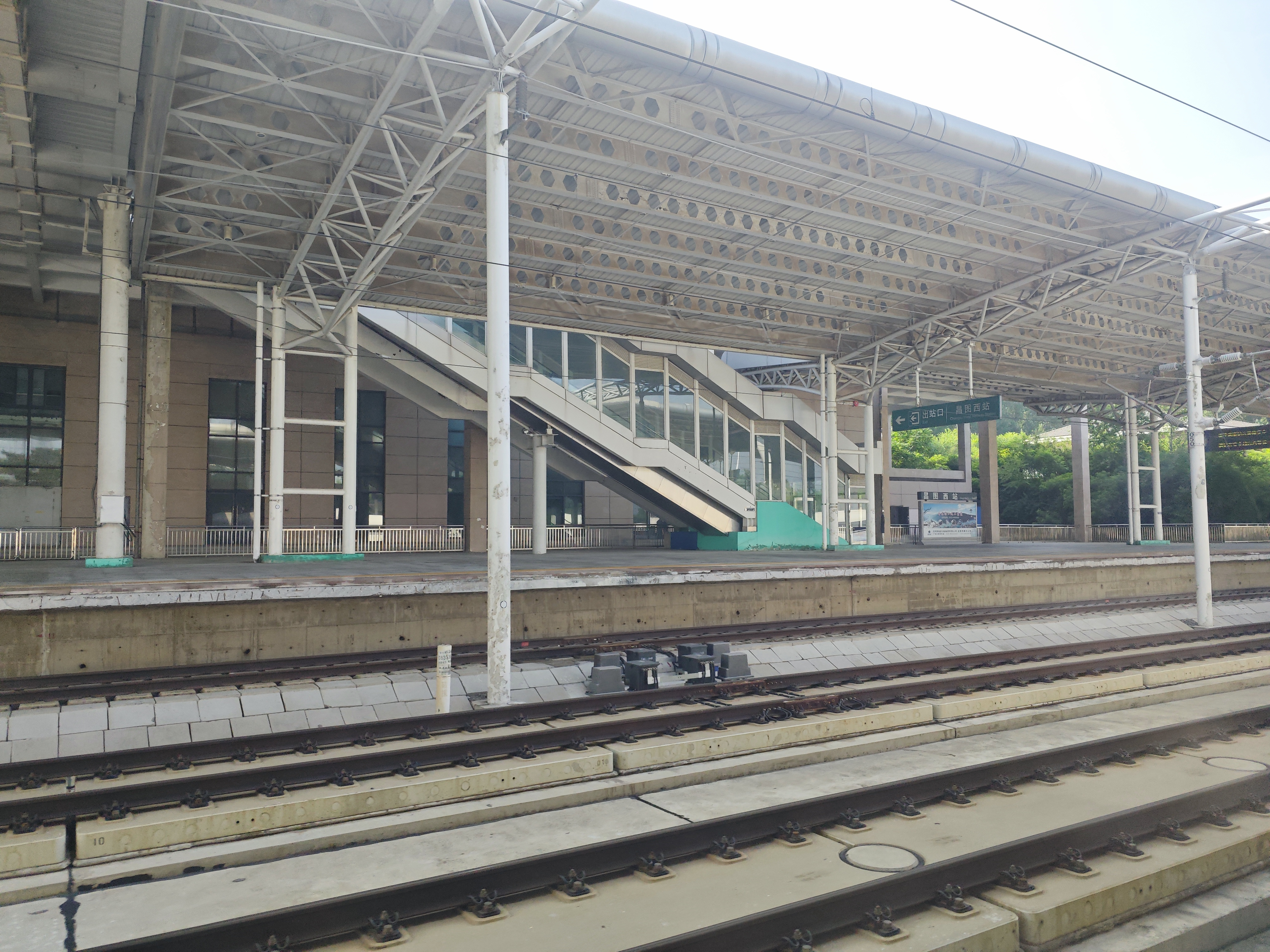

General information
- Location: Changtu County, Tieling, Liaoning; China
- Coordinates: 42.7757°N 124.0600°E
- Operated by: China Railway High-speed
- Line: Harbin–Dalian high-speed railway

Other information
- Station code: TMIS code: 53490; Telegraph code: CPT; Pinyin code: CTX

History
- Opened: December 1, 2012
Location

Changtu West railway station is a railway station in Changtu County, Tieling, Liaoning, China. It opened along with the Harbin–Dalian high-speed railway on 1 December 2012.

Preceding station	China Railway High-speed	Following station
Siping East towards Harbin	Harbin–Dalian high-speed railway	Kaiyuan West towards Dalian
