= Liaoyang railway station =

Railway station in Liaoyang, China

Liaoyang 辽阳
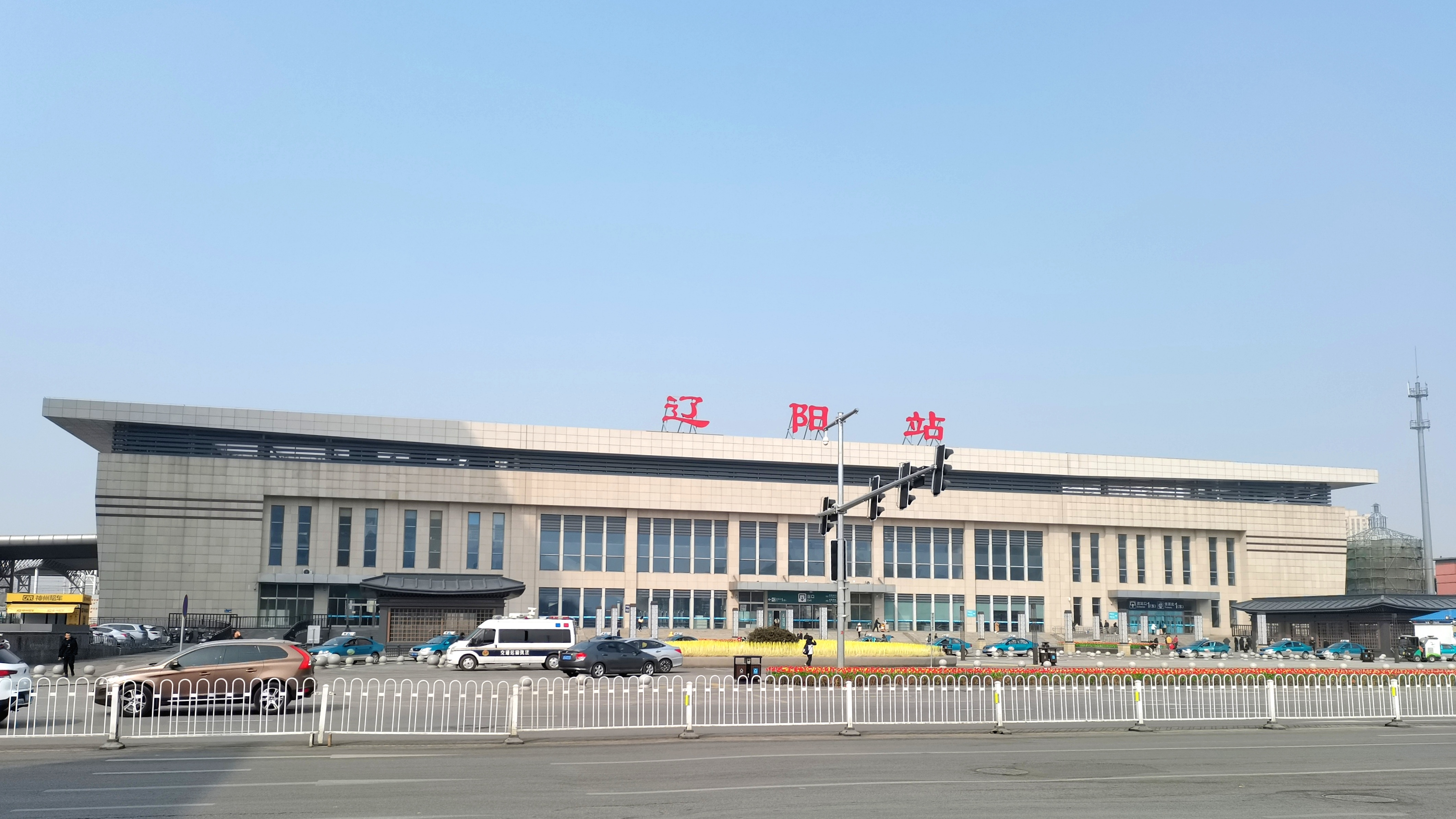
- Liaoyang railway station

General information
- Location: Baita District, Liaoyang, Liaoning; China
- Coordinates: 41°16′47″N 123°09′47″E
- Operated by: China Railway High-speed, China Railway Corporation
- Lines: Shenyang–Dalian railway Liaoyang–Benxi railway Harbin–Dalian high-speed railway

Other information
- Station code: TMIS code: 53801; Telegraph code: LYT; Pinyin code: LYA
- Classification: 2nd class station
Location

Liaoyang railway station is a railway station on the Harbin–Dalian section of the Beijing–Harbin High-Speed Railway. It is in Liaoyang, Liaoning province, China.

== See also ==
- Chinese Eastern Railway
- South Manchuria Railway
- South Manchuria Railway Zone

| Preceding station | China Railway | Following station |
|---|---|---|
| Zhangtaizi towards Shenyang North | Shenyang–Dalian railway | Anshan towards Dalian East |
| Preceding station | China Railway High-speed | Following station |
| Shenyang South towards Harbin | Harbin–Dalian high-speed railway | Anshan West towards Dalian |
