= Wafangdian West railway station =

Railway station in Dalian, China

Wafangdian West 瓦房店西

General information
- Location: Wafangdian, Dalian, Liaoning; China
- Coordinates: 39.6557°N 121.8334°E
- Operator: China Railway High-speed
- Line: Harbin–Dalian high-speed railway

History
- Opened: December 1, 2012
Location

Wafangdian West railway station is a railway station situated in Wafangdian, Dalian, Liaoning, China. It opened along with the Harbin–Dalian high-speed railway on 1 December 2012.

Preceding station	China Railway High-speed	Following station
Bayuquan towards Harbin	Harbin–Dalian high-speed railway	Jinpu towards Dalian
