= Bayuquan railway station =

Railway station in Yingkou, China

Bayuquan 鲅鱼圈
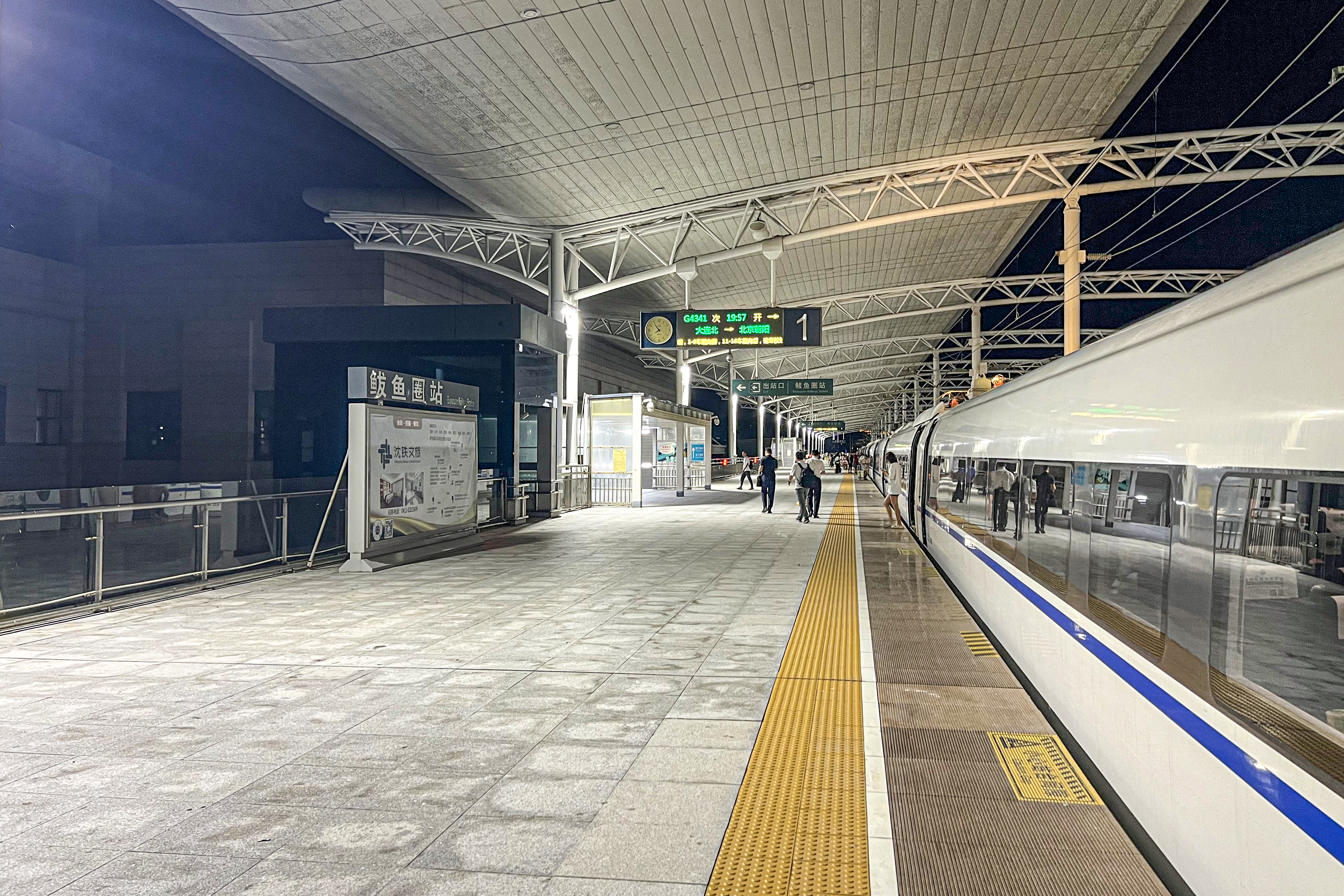
- Platform 1

General information
- Location: Bayuquan District, Yingkou, Liaoning; China
- Coordinates: 40°11′10″N 122°05′24″E
- Operated by: China Railway High-speed, China Railway Corporation
- Line(s): Harbin–Dalian high-speed railway

Other information
- Station code: TMIS code: 53511; Telegraph code: BYT; Pinyin code: BYQ

History
- Opened: December 1, 2012
Location

Bayuquan railway station is a railway station in Bayuquan District, Yingkou, Liaoning province, China. It opened along with the Harbin–Dalian high-speed railway on 1 December 2012.

== See also ==
- Chinese Eastern Railway
- South Manchuria Railway
- South Manchuria Railway Zone

Preceding station	China Railway High-speed	Following station
Gaizhou West towards Harbin	Harbin–Dalian high-speed railway	Wafangdian West towards Dalian
