= Yingkou East railway station =

Railway station in Yingkou, China

Yingkou East 营口东
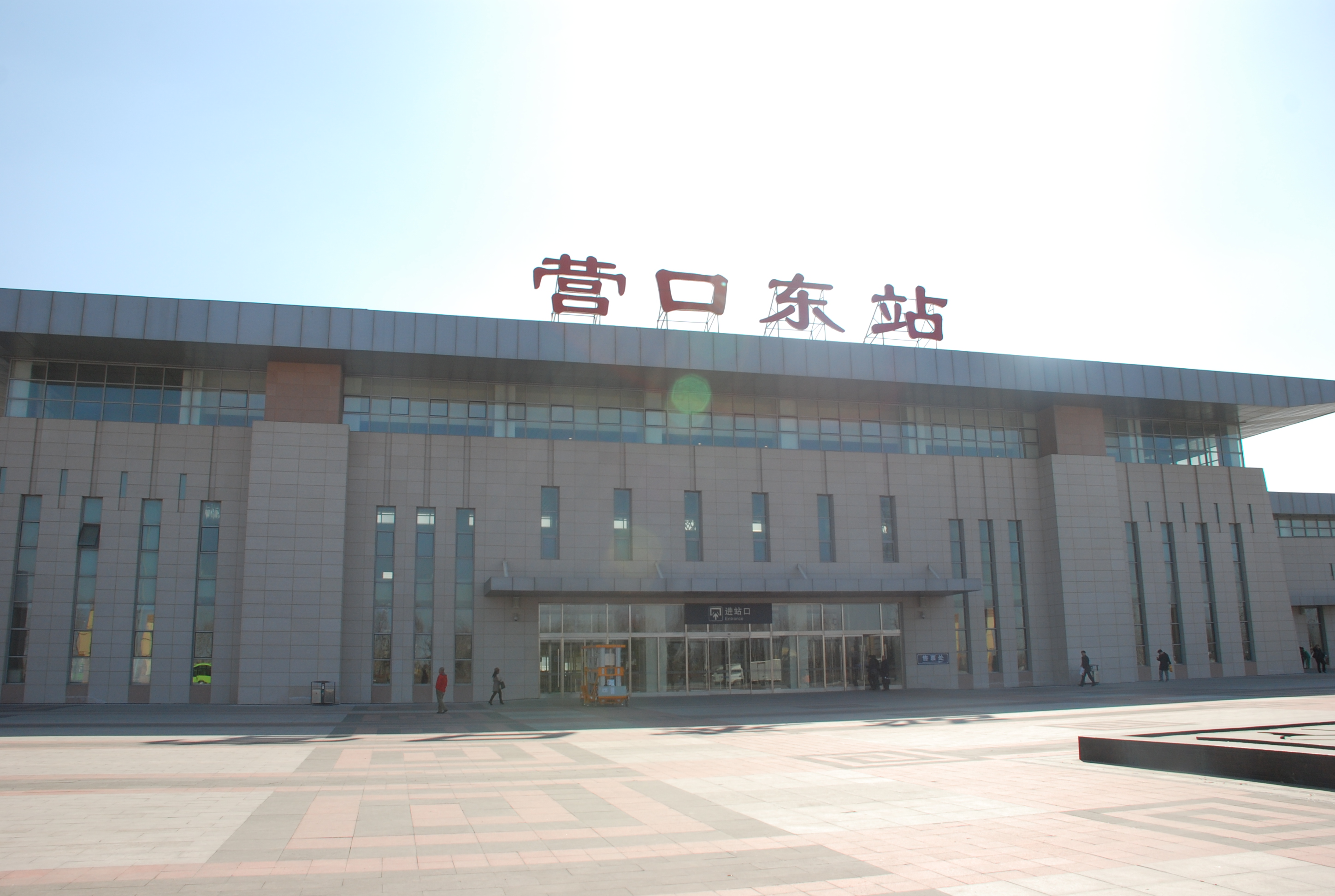
- Exterior of Yingkou East railway station

General information
- Other names: Yingkou East
- Location: Dashiqiao, Liaoning; China
- Coordinates: 40°37′26″N 122°25′25″E
- Operated by: China Railway High-speed, China Railway Corporation
- Lines: Panjin–Yingkou high-speed railway Harbin–Dalian high-speed railway

History
- Opened: December 1, 2012
Location

Yingkou East railway station (IATA: YDD) is a railway station on both the Panjin–Yingkou high-speed railway and the Harbin–Dalian high-speed railway. It is located in Dashiqiao, Yingkou prefecture, Liaoning province, China. It opened along with the Harbin–Dalian line on 1 December 2012.

== See also ==
- Chinese Eastern Railway
- South Manchuria Railway
- South Manchuria Railway Zone
- Changchun Light Rail Transit

Preceding station	China Railway High-speed	Following station
Haicheng West towards Harbin	Harbin–Dalian high-speed railway	Gaizhou West towards Dalian
