= Line 2 (Dalian Metro) =

Metro line in Dalian, China

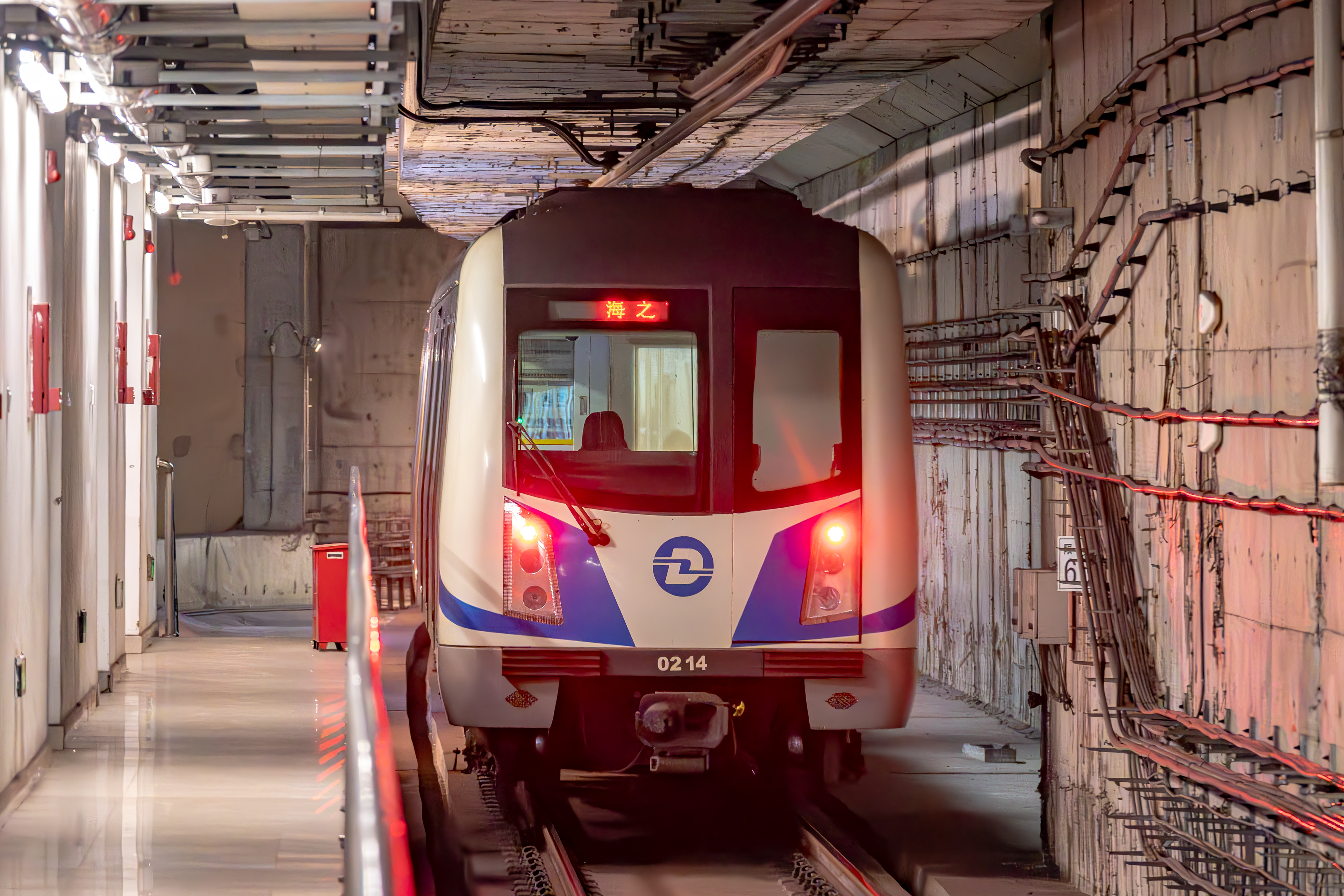
- Line 2 train

Overview
- Status: Operational
- Owner: Dalian
- Locale: Dalian, Liaoning, China
- Termini: Dalian North Railway Station; Haizhiyun
- Stations: 29

Service
- Type: Rapid transit
- System: Dalian Metro
- Services: 1
- Operator(s): Dalian Metro Group Co., Ltd.

History
- Opened: 22 May 2015; 10 years ago

Technical
- Line length: 37.97 km (23.59 mi)
- Number of tracks: 2
- Character: Underground
- Track gauge: 1,435 mm (4 ft 8 1/2 in)

Line 2 of the Dalian Metro (M2; Chinese: 大连地铁2号线; pinyin: Dàlián Dìtiě Èr Hào Xiàn), is a rapid transit line running in a "c" shape in central Dalian. Phase 1 of the line was opened on 22 May 2015. Currently, the line is 37.97 km (23.59 mi) long with 29 stations.

In October 2017, most station names were re-translated from Pinyin into conventional English.

== Opening timeline ==
Segment	Commencement	Length	Station(s)	Name
Airport — Conference Center	22 May 2015	18.85 km (11.71 mi)	17	Phase 1 (initial section)
Conference Center — Haizhiyun	7 June 2017	3.78 km (2.35 mi)	3	Phase 2 (Eastern extension)
Airport — Xinzhaizi	28 June 2018	3.12 km (1.94 mi)	1	Phase 1 (final section)
Xinzhaizi — Dalian North Railway Station	30 September 2022	11.558 km (7.18 mi)	8	Phase 2 (Northern extension)

== Service routes ==
- Dalian North Railway Station — Haizhiyun

== Stations ==
Station name		Connections	Distance km		Location
English	Chinese	Connections	Distance km		Location
Dalian North Railway Station	大连北站	1 DFT	0.00	0.00	Ganjingzi
Nanguanling	南关岭		2.49	2.49	Ganjingzi
Sports Center	体育中心		1.56	4.05	Ganjingzi
Health Center	卫生中心		1.19	5.24	Ganjingzi
Houge	后革		1.35	6.59	Ganjingzi
Gezhenpu	革镇堡		1.44	8.03	Ganjingzi
Zhongge	中革		1.30	9.33	Ganjingzi
Qiange	前革		1.80	11.13	Ganjingzi
Xinzhaizi	辛寨子		1.09	12.22	Ganjingzi
Airport	机场	DLC	3.12	15.34	Ganjingzi
Honggang Road	虹港路		0.90	16.24	Ganjingzi
Hongjin Road	虹锦路		0.95	18.09	Ganjingzi
Hongqi West Road	红旗西路		2.40	20.49	Ganjingzi
Wanjia	湾家		0.80	21.29	Ganjingzi
Malan Square	马栏广场		1.25	22.54	Shahekou
Liaoning Normal University	辽师大		1.00	23.54	Shahekou
Dalian Jiaotong University	交通大学		0.75	24.29	Shahekou
Xi'an Road	西安路	1 Dalian Tram	2.05	26.34	Shahekou
Lianhe Road	联合路		1.15	27.49	Shahekou
Renmin Square (Note: Was People's Square before 2017)	人民广场		1.35	28.84	Xigang
Yi'erjiu Street	一二九街		1.05	29.89	Xigang
Qingniwaqiao	青泥洼桥	5	1.00	30.89	Zhongshan
Youhao Square	友好广场		0.70	31.59	Zhongshan
Zhongshan Square	中山广场		0.60	32.19	Zhongshan
Gangwan Square	港湾广场		1.50	33.69	Zhongshan
Conference Center	会议中心		1.40	35.09	Zhongshan
Donggang	东港		1.33	36.42	Zhongshan
Donghai	东海		1.26	37.68	Zhongshan
Haizhiyun	海之韵		1.19	38.87	Zhongshan
