= Kaiyuan West railway station =

Railway station in Kaiyuan, China

Coordinates: 42.5474°N 123.9121°E

Kaiyuan West 开原西
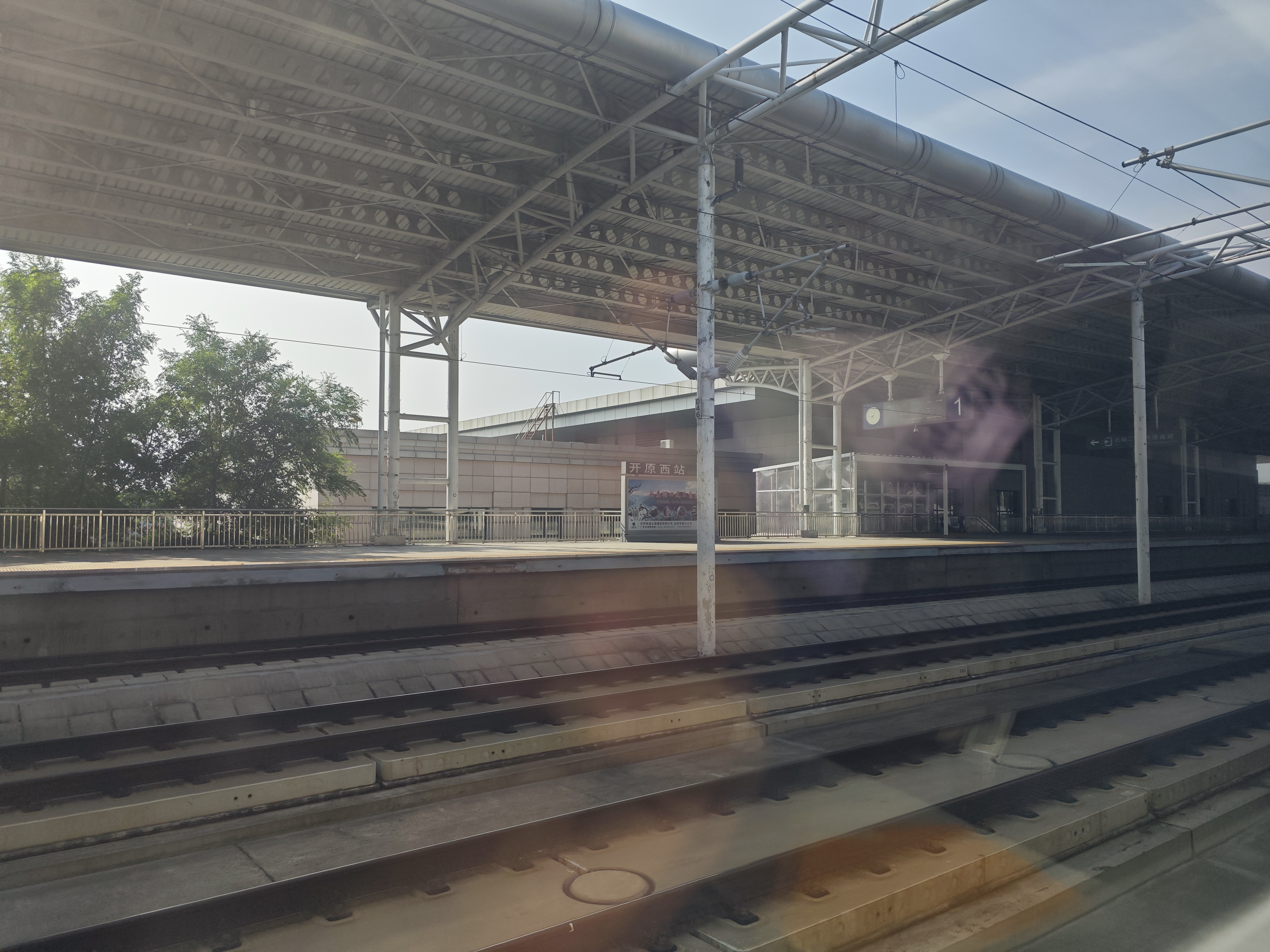

General information
- Location: Kaiyuan, Tieling, Liaoning, China; China
- Operated by: China Railway Corporation
- Line(s): Harbin–Dalian high-speed railway

Other information
- Station code: TMIS code: 53493; Telegraph code: KXT; Pinyin code: KYX

History
- Opened: 1 December 2012

Kaiyuan West railway station is an intermediate station on the Harbin–Dalian high-speed railway. It is in Kaiyuan, Tieling, Liaoning, China. It opened along with the railway on 1 December 2012.

== See also ==
- Kaiyuan railway station

Preceding station	China Railway High-speed	Following station
Changtu West towards Harbin	Harbin–Dalian high-speed railway	Tieling West towards Dalian
