= Jinpu railway station =

Railway station in Dalian, China

Jinpu 金普
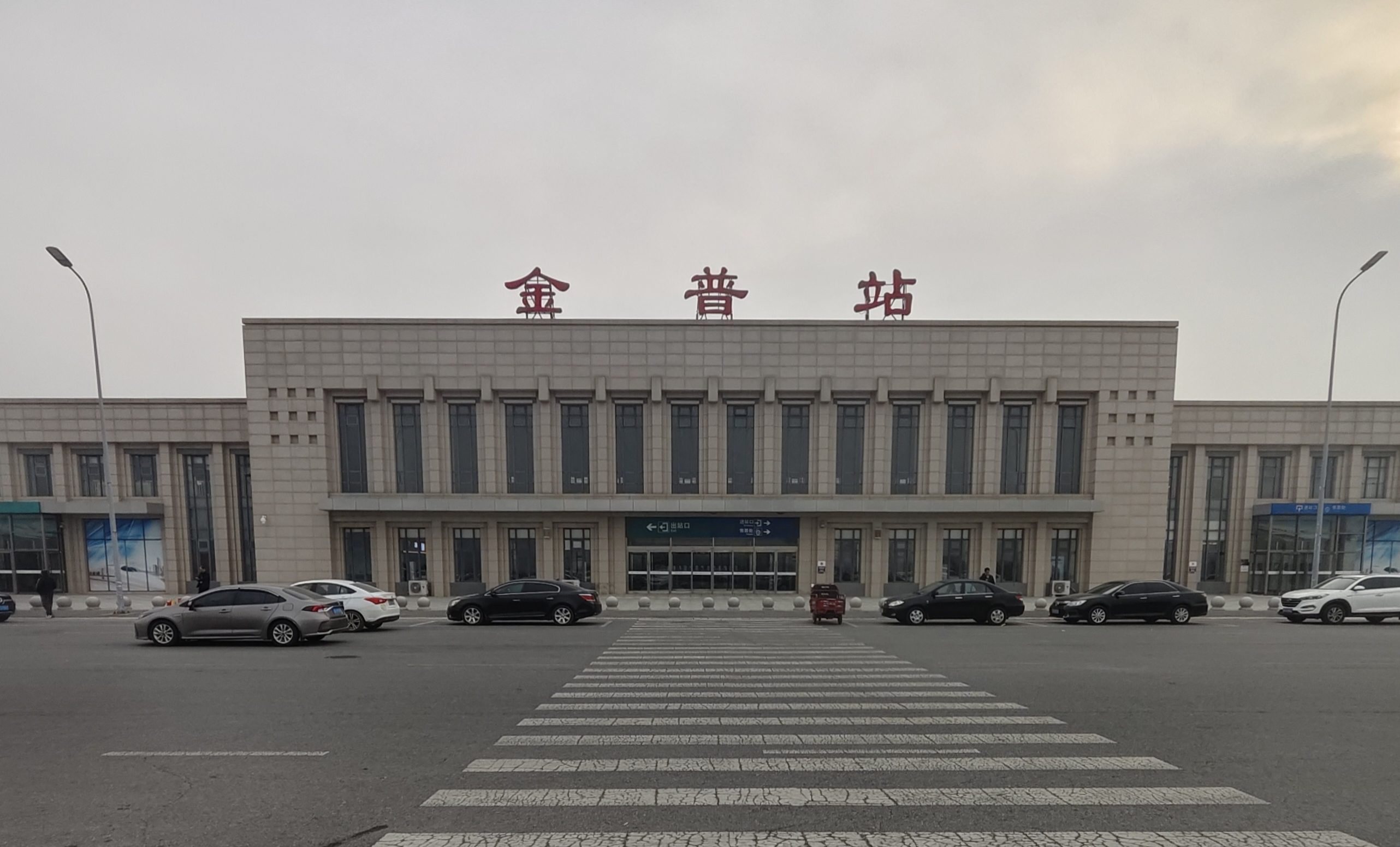

General information
- Other names: Puwan (2012-2020)
- Location: Jinzhou District, Dalian, Liaoning; China
- Coordinates: 39°19′44.08″N 121°48′30.19″E
- Operated by: China Railway High-speed
- Line: Harbin–Dalian high-speed railway

History
- Opened: December 1, 2012
Location

Jinpu railway station, formerly known as Puwan railway station, is a railway station on the Harbin–Dalian high-speed railway in Jinzhou District, Dalian, Liaoning, China. It opened along with the Harbin–Dalian high-speed railway on 1 December 2012.

Preceding station	China Railway High-speed	Following station
Wafangdian West towards Harbin	Harbin–Dalian high-speed railway	Dalian North towards Dalian
