= Liaoyang TV =

Chinese television network

Liaoyang stations established on May 1, 1985, April 1, 2002 and Liaoyang formal merger of cable television, the use of Liaoyang station call sign, logo, opened four broadcast channels. Four broadcast channels, respectively: News Channel, public channels, sports TV channels and Liaoyang educational television. Around 2007 sports TV channel is revoked, Liaoyang Liaoyang educational television station call sign becomes Educational Technology Channel.

== Development process ==
Establishment and development of Liaoyang television, can be divided into two stages: (A) in August 1971 to establish Liaoyang end -1984 TV relay stations. (B) May 1, 1985 Liaoyang television, began running the television program, broadcast twice a week (Tuesday and Friday); January 21, 1987 began broadcasting three times a week (Monday, Wednesday and Friday); May 1, 1988 start seven weekly broadcast. August 1971, Liaoyang Municipal People's Broadcasting Station entrusted Revolutionary Committee, to build television sets. After a year and four months of fighting, and finally on December 26, 1972 began commissioning CCTV programs.

January 4, 1984, Liaoyang City Broadcasting and Television Bureau to the municipal government drafted the "Report on referrals running the TV show."

June 18, 1984 the municipal government held a forum to raise funds run by television programs, establish a working television into the preparation stage.

May 1, 1985, after six months of intense preparation, Liaoyang stations began running the first pilot program.

In 1992, the Bureau of Liaoyang Party decided to build the cable television station, was founded to build teams.

October 1, 1993 Liaoyang Cable formally launched, running the two programs. Liaoyang oriented cable television station with clear, colorful programs, civilian style, suited for the majority of the TV audience.

In 2001, the educational television to restore the building and on March 18 the official broadcast, wired and wireless 16 channels 25 channels. Liaoyang educational broadcasting station, the municipal government in 2001 as one of the city's ten-person private good thing, she was established to meet the needs of radio and television broadcasting channels worldwide professional development.

July 1, 2001, Liaoyang Liaoyang television and cable stations combined, call sign "Liaoyang TV".

April 1, 2002, Liaoyang television stations, cable television stations officially merged Liaoyang, Liaoyang station using the call sign, logo, opened four broadcast channels. Four broadcast channels, respectively: News Channel, public channels, sports TV channels and Liaoyang educational television.

In 2004, the public channel (former cable television set) to get 37 channels of wireless TV transmitter licenses covered by a simple cable TV channels into double coverage of wireless cable television channel.

in 2007, only one simple cable television channels covering Style Television Channel is revoked, Liaoyang Liaoyang educational television station call sign becomes Educational Technology Channel.

== Location ==
Liaoyang City, Liaoning Province, Liaoyang, 59(辽宁省辽阳市青年大街59号)
