= Dehui West railway station =

Railway station in China

Coordinates: 44.5435°N 125.6694°E

Dehui West railway station

Dehui West railway station is a railway station of Hada Passenger Railway located in Jilin, China. Additional measures were taken in 2024 ahead of an expected travel rush during the Spring Festival, such as additional trains and thorough maintenance and inspections.
