= Gaizhou West railway station =

Railway station in Gaizhou, China

Gaizhou West 盖州西

General information
- Location: Gaizhou, Yingkou, Liaoning; China
- Coordinates: 40.4028°N 122.2694°E
- Operated by: China Railway High-speed
- Line(s): Harbin–Dalian high-speed railway

Other information
- Station code: TMIS code: 53508; Telegraph code: GAT; Pinyin code: GZX

History
- Opened: December 1, 2012

Gaizhou West railway station is a railway station in Gaizhou, Yingkou, Liaoning, China. It opened along with the Harbin–Dalian high-speed railway on 1 December 2012.

== See also ==
- Gaizhou railway station

Preceding station	China Railway High-speed	Following station
Yingkou East towards Harbin	Harbin–Dalian high-speed railway	Bayuquan towards Dalian
