= Line 1 (Dalian Metro) =

Metro line in Dalian, China

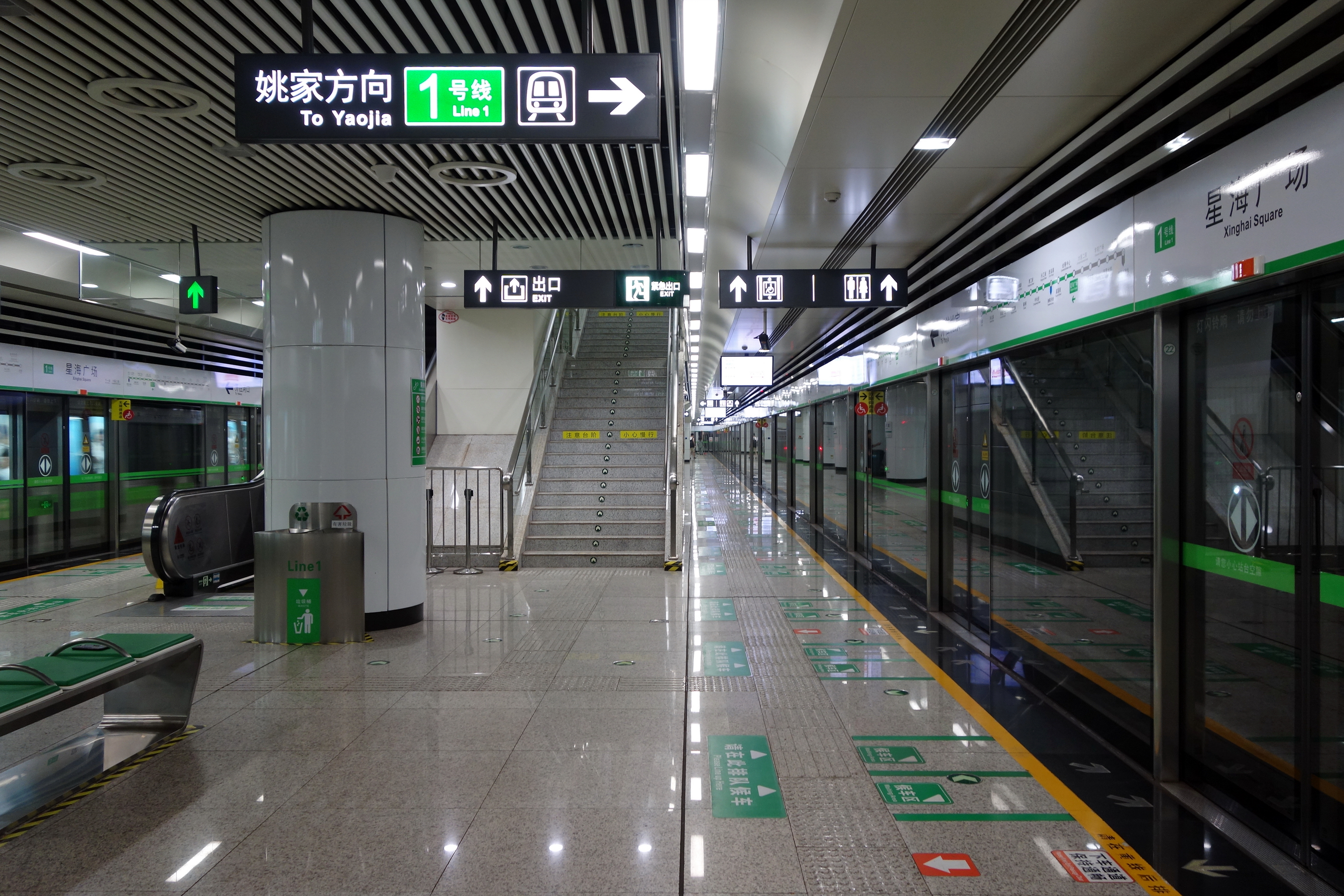
- Xinghai Square station

Overview
- Status: Operational
- Owner: Dalian
- Locale: Dalian, Liaoning, China
- Termini: Yaojia; Hekou
- Stations: 22

Service
- Type: Rapid transit
- System: Dalian Metro
- Services: 1
- Operator(s): Dalian Metro Group Co., Ltd.

History
- Opened: 30 October 2015; 9 years ago

Technical
- Line length: 28.34 km (17.61 mi)
- Number of tracks: 2
- Character: Underground
- Track gauge: 1,435 mm (4 ft 8 1/2 in)

Line 1 of the Dalian Metro (M1; Chinese: 大连地铁1号线; pinyin: Dàlián Dìtiě Yī Hào Xiàn) is a rapid transit line running from north to south in central Dalian. It was first opened on 30 October 2015. The line is 28.34 km (17.61 mi) long with 22 stations.

== History ==
The line was built in phases, with the 13-station first phase, running from Yaojia to Fuguo Street, opening on 30 October 2015. The line was extended to Convention & Exhibition Center on 29 January 2016 and Hua'nan North station was opened on 1 June 2017. The second phase of the line, which consisted of the eastward extension of the line from Convention & Exhibition Center to Hekou, opened on 7 June 2017. In October 2017, most station names were re-translated from Pinyin into conventional English.

=== Opening timeline ===
| Segment | Commencement | Length | Station(s) | Name |
|---|---|---|---|---|
| Yaojia — Fuguo Street | 30 October 2015 | 16.50 km (10.25 mi) | 13 | Phase 1 (initial section) |
| Fuguo Street — Convention & Exhibition Center | 29 January 2016 | 1.21 km (0.75 mi) | 1 | Phase 1 (final section) |
| Hua'nan North | 1 June 2017 | Infill station | 1 | |
| Convention & Exhibition Center — Hekou | 7 June 2017 | 9.06 km (5.63 mi) | 7 | Phase 2 |

== Future Development ==
Phase 3 of Line 1 from Yaojia to Dalian New Airport (Dalian Jinzhouwan Airport) is under planning.

== Service routes ==
- Hekou — Yaojia

== Stations ==
| Station name | | Connections | Distance km | | Location |
| English | Chinese | Connections | Distance km | | Location |
|---|---|---|---|---|---|
| Dalian New Airport | 新机场 | | | | |
| Bohai Road | 渤海路 | | | | |
| Houguan | 后关 | 5 | | | |
| Guibai Road | 桧柏路 | | | | |
| Yaojia | 姚家 | | 0.00 | 0.00 | Ganjingzi |
| Dalian North Railway Station | 大连北站 | 2 DFT | 1.60 | 1.60 | Ganjingzi |
| Huabei Road | 华北路 | | 1.40 | 3.00 | Ganjingzi |
| Hua'nan North | 华南北 | | 1.30 | 4.30 | Ganjingzi |
| Hua'nan Square | 华南广场 | | 1.10 | 5.40 | Ganjingzi |
| Qianshan Road | 千山路 | | 1.25 | 6.65 | Ganjingzi |
| Songjiang Road | 松江路 | 4 (U/C) | 1.10 | 7.75 | Ganjingzi |
| Dongwei Road | 东纬路 | | 1.50 | 9.25 | Ganjingzi |
| Chunliu | 春柳 | | 2.70 | 11.95 | Shahekou |
| Xianggong Street | 香工街 | | 0.70 | 12.65 | Shahekou |
| Zhongchang Street | 中长街 | | 1.00 | 13.65 | Shahekou |
| Xinggong Street | 兴工街 | Dalian Tram | 0.85 | 14.50 | Shahekou |
| Xi'an Road | 西安路 | 2 Dalian Tram | 0.80 | 15.30 | Shahekou |
| Fuguo Street | 富国街 | Dalian Tram | 1.25 | 16.55 | Shahekou |
| Convention and Exhibition Center | 会展中心 | Dalian Tram | 0.85 | 17.40 | Shahekou |
| Xinghai Square | 星海广场 | Dalian Tram | 0.79 | 18.19 | Shahekou |
| 2nd Hospital of Dalian Medical University | 大医二院 | Dalian Tram | 1.16 | 19.35 | Shahekou |
| Heishijiao | 黑石礁 | Dalian Tram | 1.37 | 20.72 | Shahekou |
| Xueyuan Square | 学苑广场 | Dalian Tram | 1.26 | 21.98 | Shahekou |
| Dalian Maritime University | 海事大学 | Dalian Tram | 1.46 | 23.44 | Ganjingzi |
| Qixianling | 七贤岭 | Dalian Tram | 1.11 | 24.55 | Ganjingzi |
| Hekou | 河口 | 12 Dalian Tram | 1.91 | 26.46 | Ganjingzi |
