= Panjin–Yingkou high-speed railway =

Railway line in Liaoning, China

Beijing–Harbin high-speed railway Panjin–Yingkou section 京哈高速铁路盘营段

Overview
- Owner: China Railway
- Locale: Liaoning
- Termini: Panjin North; Yingkou East
- Stations: 3

Service
- Type: High-speed rail
- Operator(s): China Railway High-speed
- Rolling stock: CRH380B series

History
- Opened: September 12, 2013

Technical
- Line length: 89.422 km (55.564 mi)
- Track gauge: 1,435 mm (4 ft 8 1/2 in)
- Operating speed: 350 km/h (220 mph)

Panjin–Yingkou high-speed railway
- Simplified Chinese: 盘营客运专线
- Traditional Chinese: 盤營客運專線
Transcriptions
Standard Mandarin
- Hanyu Pinyin: Pán-Yíng Kèyùn Zhuānxiàn

Beijing–Harbin HSR Panjin–Yingkou section
- Simplified Chinese: 京哈高速铁路盘营段
- Traditional Chinese: 京哈高速鐵路盤營段
Transcriptions
Standard Mandarin
- Hanyu Pinyin: Jīng-Hā Gāosù Tiělù Pán-Yíng Duàn

Panjin–Yingkou high-speed railway (Chinese: 盘营客运专线) is a high-speed rail line operated by China Railway High-speed in central Liaoning province, connecting the coastal cities of Panjin and Yingkou, with a total length of 89.422 km (55.564 mi) and start construction on May 31, 2009. The design speed is 350 km/h (220 mph). Total cost of this project is 127.86 million RMB. The line opened on September 12, 2013.

The minimum curvature of this line is 5,500 m (18,000 ft).

The line linked the existing Qinhuangdao–Shenyang passenger railway and Harbin–Dalian high-speed railway, shortening journeys between the Liaodong Peninsula and the south by avoiding Shenyang. It has one intermediate station, Panjin railway station.
