= South Manchuria Railway Zone =

Area of Japanese extraterritorial rights in northeast China in 1937

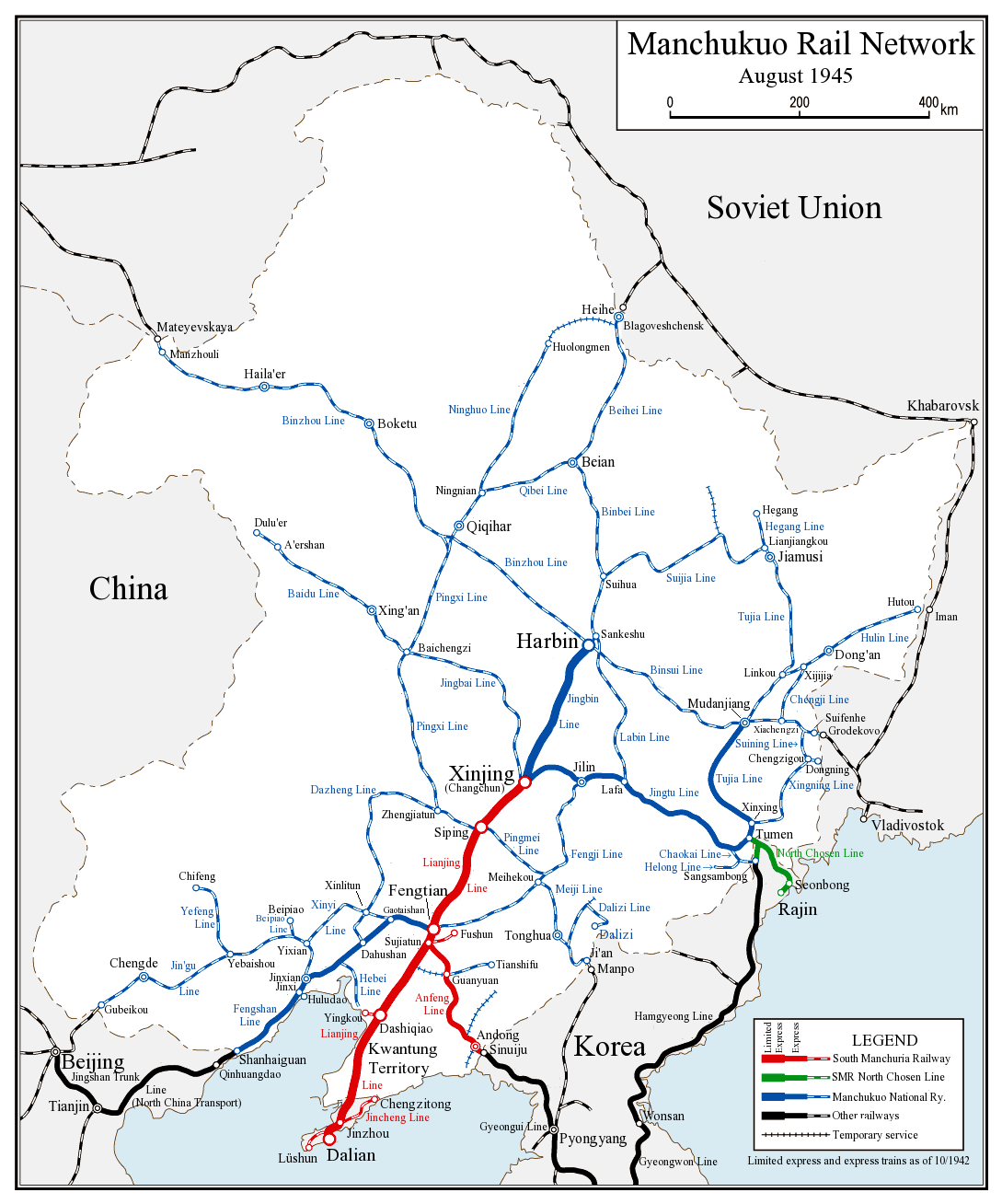
- Rail network of Manchukuo in 1945, South Manchuria railway shown in red.

Overview
- Other name: SMR Zone
- Native name: 南満州鉄道附属地
- Status: Defunct
- Owner: Empire of Japan
- Locale: Manchuria
- Termini: Lüshun, Changchun, and Dandong
- Stations: 25

Service
- Type: Regional rail
- System: CER
- Operator: South Manchuria Railway Company, Ltd.

History
- Opened: 5 September 1905
- Closed: 1937

Technical
- Line length: 1,100 km (680 mi)

South Manchuria Railway Zone

Chinese name
- Traditional Chinese: 南滿洲鐵道附屬地
- Simplified Chinese: 南满洲铁道附属地
Transcriptions
Standard Mandarin
- Hanyu Pinyin: Nánmǎnzhōu Tiědào Fùshǔ-dì
- Wade–Giles: Nan2man3-chou1 Tʻieh3-tao4 Fu4-shu3-ti4

Japanese name
- Kanji: 南満州鉄道附属地
- Hiragana: みなみまんしゅうてつどうふぞくち
- Katakana: ミナミマンシュウテツドウフゾクチ
Transcriptions
- Romanization: Minamimanshū Tetsudō Fuzoku-chi

The South Manchuria Railway Zone (Japanese: 南満州鉄道附属地, romanized: Minami Manshū Tetsudō Fuzoku-chi; simplified Chinese: 南满洲铁道附属地; traditional Chinese: 南滿洲鐵道附屬地; pinyin: Nán Mǎnzhōu Tiědào Fùshǔ-dì; Wade–Giles: Nan^{2} Man^{3}-chou^{1} Tʻieh^{3}-tao^{4} Fu^{4}-shu^{3}-ti^{4}) or SMR Zone, was the area of Japanese extraterritorial rights in northeast China, in connection with the operation of the South Manchurian Railway.

The routing of the main line of the Chinese Eastern Railway (Manzhouli to Harbin to Suifenhe), here labelled the Trans-Manchurian Railway, and its southern branch (Harbin to Dalian). After 1905, most of the southern branch (from Changchun to Dalian) became the Japan-run South Manchuria Railway

== History ==
Following the Japanese victory in 1905 over Imperial Russia in the Russo-Japanese War and the signing of the Treaty of Portsmouth, the South Manchuria branch (from Changchun to Lüshun) of the China Far East Railway was transferred to Japanese control. Japan claimed that this control included all the rights and privileges granted to Russia by China in the Li-Lobanov Treaty of 1896, as enlarged by the Kwantung Lease Agreement of 1898, which included absolute and exclusive administration within the railway zone.

The Zone was geographically a 62 m wide strip of land on either side of the South Manchurian Railway tracks, extending along the 700 km main trunk route from Dalian to Changchun, the 260 km Mukden to Dandong route, and four other spur routes, for a total length of 1100 km and a total land area of 250 km^{2}. The rail lines connected 25 cities and towns, and within each town, the zone included warehouses, repair shops, coal mines and electrical facilities that were deemed necessary to maintain the trains. From 1931 onwards it was legally not part of Manchukuo, nor was it in Japan. It was exempt from the laws of either. Basically it was a spiderweb-shaped corporate country. If somehow clumped together, the Zone would have been the area of New York City.

Japan stationed railway guards to provide security for the trains and tracks throughout the zone, but they were regular Japanese soldiers and frequently carried on maneuvers outside the railway areas. In addition, Japan also maintained Consular Police attached to the Japanese consulates and branch consulates in major cities as Harbin, Qiqihar, and Manzhouli as well as in the Chientao District in which lived large numbers of ethnic Koreans.

In 1915, Japan presented to China the Twenty-One Demands, resulting in the Sino-Japanese Treaty of 1915. It provided that Japanese subjects would be free to reside and travel in South Manchuria, and engage in business and manufacture of any kind and lease land that was necessary for erecting suitable buildings for trade, manufacturing, and agricultural enterprises. Japan loosely interpreted that to include most of Manchuria in the term "South Manchuria."

After the foundation of Manchukuo, with full Japanese control over all of Manchuria, the zone ceased to have a function and was abolished in 1937.

The South Manchuria Railway Zone had its own private military force, mostly local volunteers of Korean and Japanese descent.

== See also ==
- City-state
- Corporatocracy
- Micronation
- Microstate
