= Dalian Maple Leaf International School =

International school in Dalian, China

- 大连枫叶国际学校

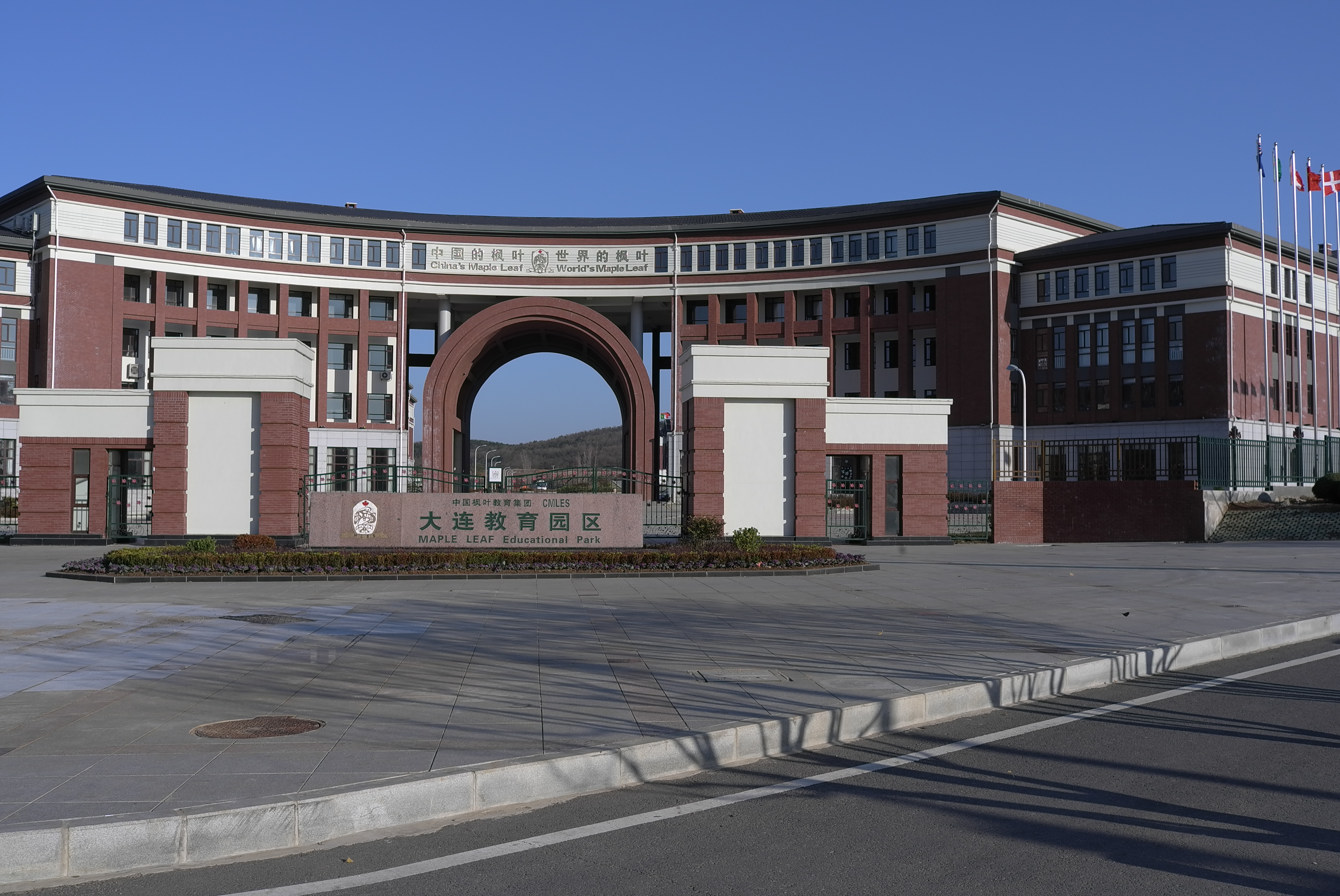
- Former Maple Leaf Educational Systems headquarters on the Jinshitan high-school campus, photographed in 2011

Location
- 9 Central Street, Jinshitan National Holiday Resort; Dalian, Liaoning, 116650; China; 39.08599°N 122.01311°E

Information
- Type: Private international school
- Established: 1995
- Founder: Sherman Jen
- Affiliation: Maple Leaf Educational Systems
- Website: dlsenior.mapleleaf.cn

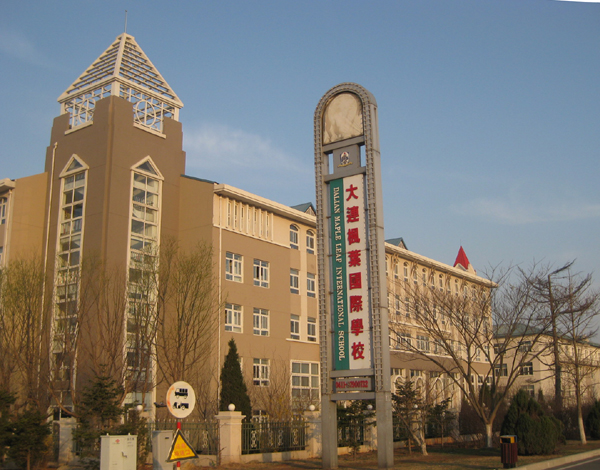
Dalian Maple Leaf International School (The High School in Jinshitan)

Dalian Maple Leaf International School (Chinese: 大连枫叶国际学校) is a private educational system, located in Dalian, Liaoning Province. It offers courses from the primary to middle and high school levels. It is known to be the first international school established in China and it is affiliated to the educational system of British Columbia, Canada.

== General ==
Dalian Maple Leaf International School is an educational system, located in Dalian, Liaoning Province, from the primary to middle and high school levels. It is managed by Maple Leaf Educational Systems and Schools, with its headquarters in Dalian City.

== Other Locations ==
- Wuhan
- Jingzhou
- Shanghai
- Tianjing
- Chongqing
- Eerduosi
- Liangping
- Hainan
- Henan
- Huaian
- Huaifang
- Huzhou
- Pingdingshan
- Pinghu
- Xian
- Yiwu
- Yancheng
- Zhenjiang

Outside China:

- Kamloops, British Columbia, Canada

The schools are:

- Primary school in Dalian Development Area, Jinzhou District, Dalian
- China’s Largest Private K-12 and Largest international school system
- British Columbia’s first and Canada’s largest offshore school system
- British Columbia’s largest employer of new teachers
- High schools inspected and accredited by AdvancED – USA government recognized and the largest school accrediting body in the world (accrediting more than 38,000 schools in more than 75 counties around the world
- Middle school in Daheishi (Lushun North Road), Dalian
- High School in Jinshitan, Jinzhou District, Dalian
- Pre-School to Grade 9 Foreign Nationals School in Xigang (Dalian), Dalian
- World’s Top Ranked universities admitting 2016 MLES graduates included Imperial College London, UCL, University of California-Berkeley, University of California-Los Angeles, McGill University, UBC, University of Toronto, University of Melbourne, Chinese University of Hong Kong, Australian National University, University of Alberta, McMaster University, and Tsinghua University. Their graduates receive the diplomas equivalent to those of the public education system in British Columbia, Canada.

== See also ==
- Dalian American International School
- Dalian Japanese School
