= Astana Cemetery =

Ancient tombs in Xinjiang, China

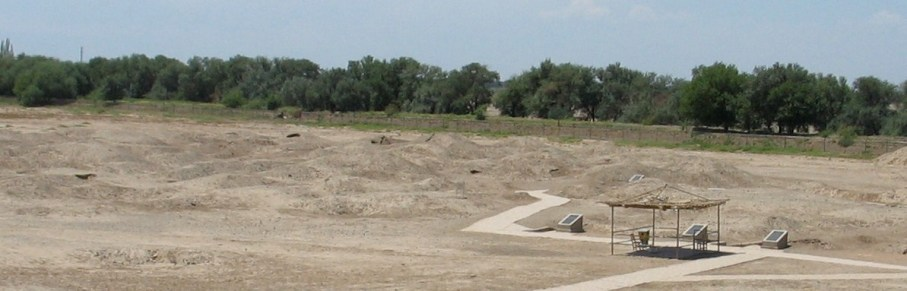
- A view of the Astana Cemetery

- Location of Astana Astana Cemetery (Bayingolin)
- 42.882°N 89.529°E
- Location: China
- Region: Xinjiang

The Astana Cemetery (Chinese: 阿斯塔那古墓; pinyin: Āsītǎnà Gǔmù) is an ancient cemetery 37 kilometers (23 mi) southeast of Turpan, in Xinjiang, China, 6 kilometres (3.7 mi) from the ancient city of Gaochang. It served mainly as the cemetery for the descendants of Chinese settlers in Gaochang from the 4th century to the first half of the 8th century. The complex covers 10 square kilometres (3.9 sq mi) and contains over 1,000 tombs. Due to the arid environment many important artifacts have been well preserved at the tombs, including natural mummies.

== Description of the tombs ==
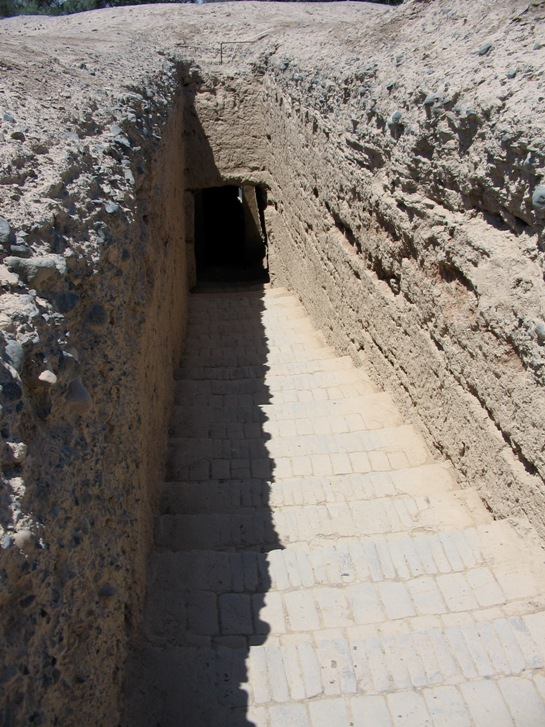
Stairs leading to an underground tomb.

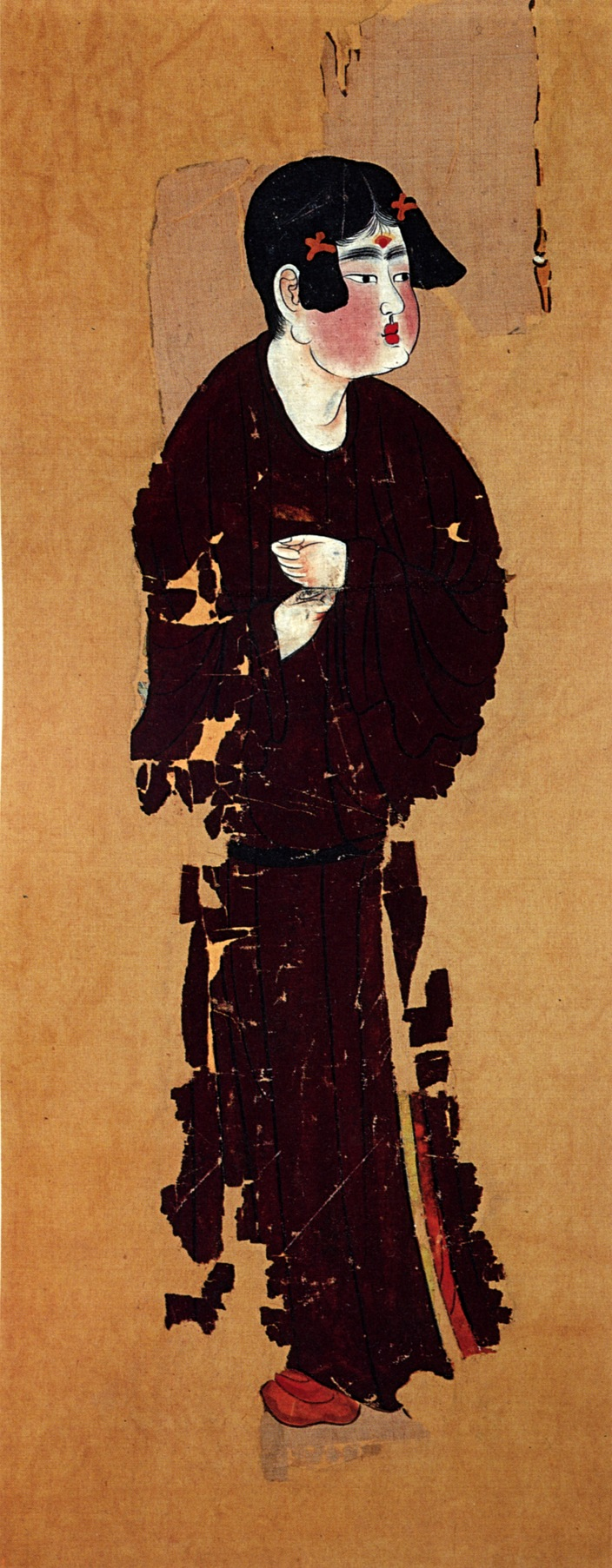
Portrait of a servant, mid-8th century, color on silk, Tang dynasty, from the Astana Graves

The tombs consist of sloping passageways leading downwards for 4 or 5m to a rockcut entrance, about a meter wide and over a meter high. A step then leads into a brick-lined chamber, square or oblong and measuring between two and four meters wide, three to four meters long and up to two meters high. Some tombs contain one or two narrow antechambers in which there are niches on either side for guardian beasts in effigy. These figures show a variety of animal features, and some have human faces. In their exuberance they resemble the clay statues of Guardian Kings similarly found at the entrance to Buddhist temples.

The body or bodies were shrouded in textiles. A silver oval shaped eye-mask and an oval piece of silk covered the face. Sometimes coins were used instead of these eye-masks. The origin of placing a coin inside the mouth is unclear: Stein saw parallels with the Greek custom of providing the deceased with the fare for the ferryman of Hades, but Chinese scholars have argued the same custom is seen in Chinese burials from the first millennium BC. The coins included Byzantine, locally minted replica Byzantine, other locally minted replica Chinese coins and Chinese coins.

The bodies were originally placed inside wooden coffins, propped up with bundles of paper, and with small articles of personal use and models of garments made from paper and silk—such as shoes and hats—placed alongside them. Other offerings were placed inside wooden or pottery vessels near the head of the coffin on a wooden pedestal. Many of the vessels were painted with a distinctive pattern of white dots and red lines. Remains of food, desiccated but identifiable, were found in some of the unrobbed tombs and included grapes, plums, pears, pieces of meat and wheat. Several tombs contained well-preserved pastries, including a jam tart.

According to Chinese beliefs, the afterlife was very similar to the life from which they had departed, and the deceased were therefore buried with goods and money they would require. However, it was sufficient to bury models and not original objects. These include human figurines, animals, clothes, ornaments and musical instruments. They were listed on a written inventory, also placed inside the tomb. Many tombs also contained epitaph tablets for the dead and a funerary banner showing the Chinese mythological figures, Fuxi and Nüwa.

There are various Tang dynasty figurines and Chinese silk paintings found in the cemetery. A new pavilion has been built outside the cemetery the centerpiece of which is a large statue of Fuxi and Nüwa.

=== History of the area ===
At the start of the first millennium this area was occupied by the Jushi who offered allegiance to the Chinese Han court. According to the Chinese histories, the Shiji and Hanshu, the original inhabitants east of the Tian Shan to the beginning of the first millennium AD, the Jushi, were a people who 'lived in felt-tents, kept moving in pursuit of water and grass for grazing, and had a fair knowledge of farming.' The Chinese rulers divided their territory in 60 BC and stationed a garrison and military colony there. Until 450 AD the main city was Jiaohe, west of present-day Turfan. At times the Chinese lost control to the Xiongnu and also withdrew when control in central China broke down. In the early 4th century an alternative commandery was established in Gaochang to the east of present-day Turfan, and this area also fell in and out of Chinese and steppe control over the following centuries.

== Excavations ==
The site was visited by many of the archaeological expeditions sent by various imperial powers to Chinese Central Asia in the first two decades of the 20th century, among them the Japanese expeditions of Ōtani Kōzui in 1902, the German expeditions led by Albert Grünwedel (November 1902–March 1903) and Albert von Le Coq (1904–1907, 1913–1914), and the Russian Sergey Oldenburg between 1909 and 1910. The archaeologist Aurel Stein also went to Astana in 1907, then returned for longer in December 1914.

Chinese archaeologists have undertaken over ten excavations at the Astana and Gaochang graveyards from 1959 onwards, unearthing 456 tombs, 205 of which contained manuscript fragments. Most of these fragments were originally part of funerary objects—paper shoes, paper hats, paper belts, and paper coffins—made from discarded documents. Two thousand documents were found which yield insights into the life of the people there.

=== Objects from the tombs ===
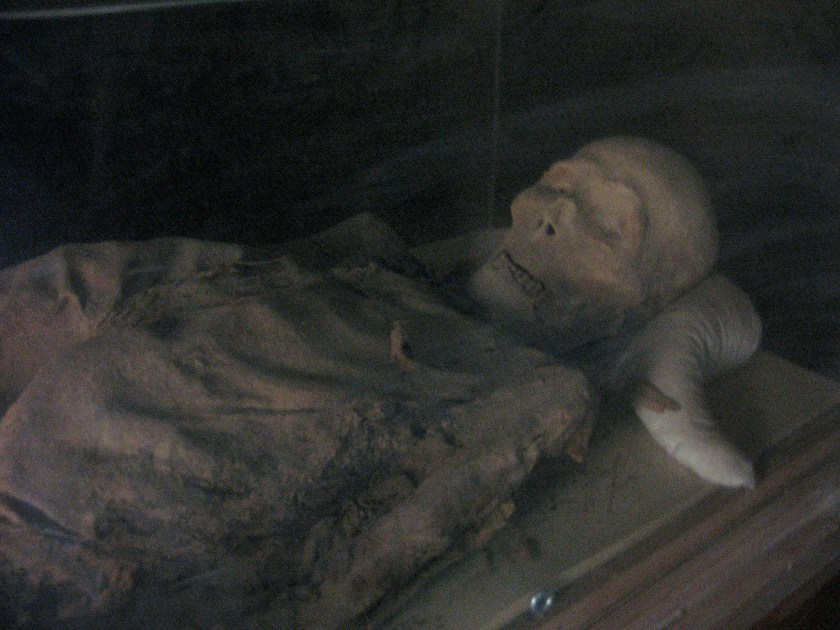
A mummy from a tomb at the Astana Graves

Material from the Russian explorations was originally deposited in the Asiatic Museum of St. Petersburg. Later the manuscripts were transferred to the St Petersburg Branch of the Institute of Oriental Studies of the Russian Academy of Sciences. The Japanese collections were taken to Kyoto but were soon dispersed after Otani resigned as Abbot of Nishi Honganji in 1914. Unlike the other expeditions, the Japanese monk-explorers were privately funded by Otani and so the finds were not deposited in public collections. Although by 1926 the first expedition material was in the Imperial Gift Museum of Kyoto, by 1944 these items were in the hands of the private collector Teizo Kimura.

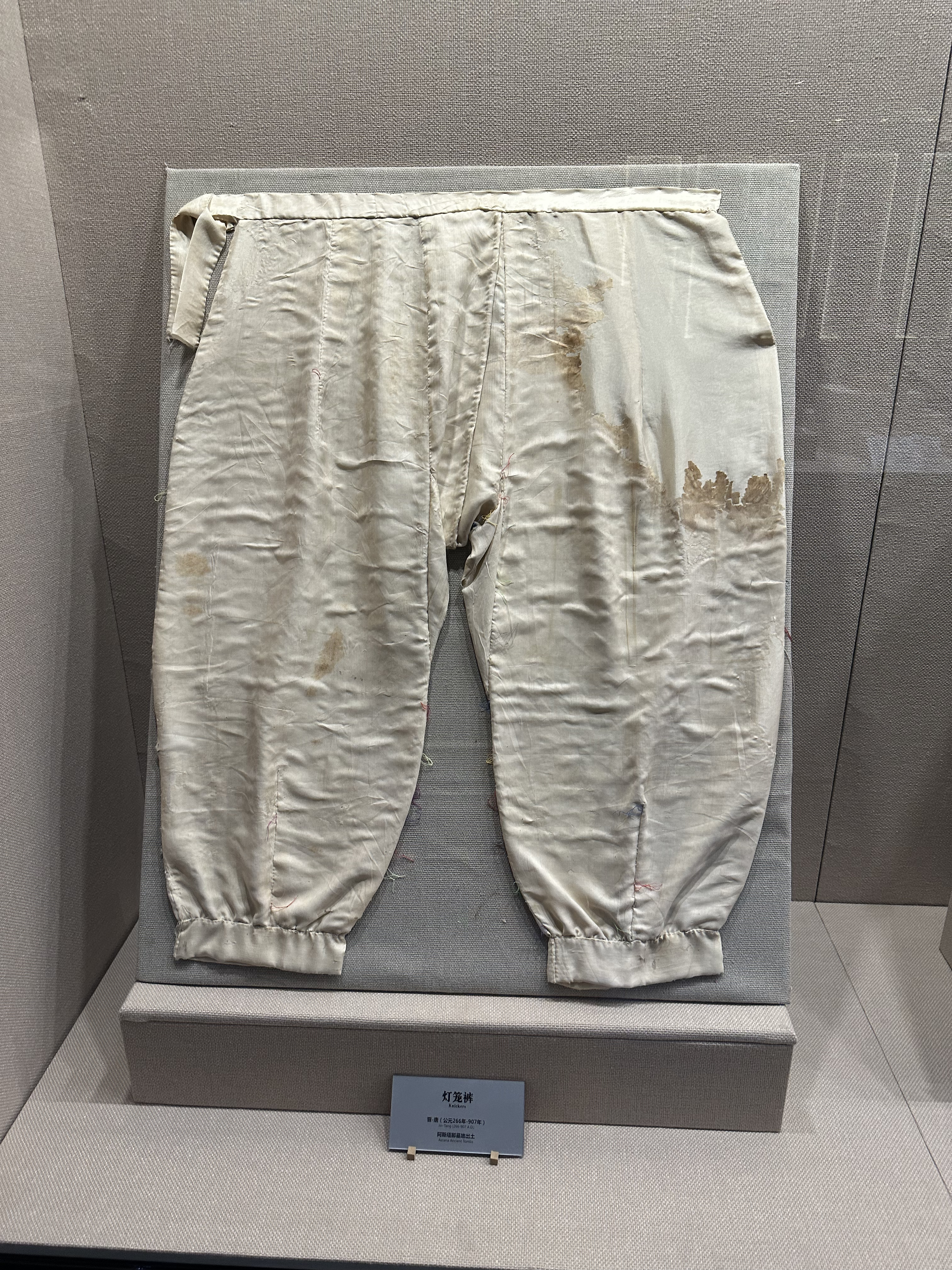
Pants from Astana cemetery, 3rd-9th century CE

The Japanese Government had to repurchase them after the war and, along with some other items bought from other individuals, the collection was deposited in the Oriental Section of Tokyo National Museum, where it remains today. A large part of Otani's second and third expedition material were kept in his house and sold along with the house in 1916. The buyer, Fusanoske Kuhara, was a friend of Terauchi Masatake, Governor-General of Korea (annexed by Japan in 1910). He presented the collection to his friend who kept it in the Museum of the Governor-General, which later became the National Central Museum in Seoul (now the National Museum of Korea). The German collections are in the Staatsbibliothek (manuscripts) and the Museum for Asian Art, Berlin. Stein's collections from Astana are in the British Library, the British Museum, the Victoria and Albert Museum and the National Museum, New Delhi.

Many thousands of artifacts found by Chinese archaeologists since 1958 were removed to the Ürümqi Museum. Objects from the tombs from various excavations have been displayed in several exhibitions.

== Gallery ==
=== Sichuan brocade ===
Sichuan brocade fabrics unearthed at Astana Cemetery.

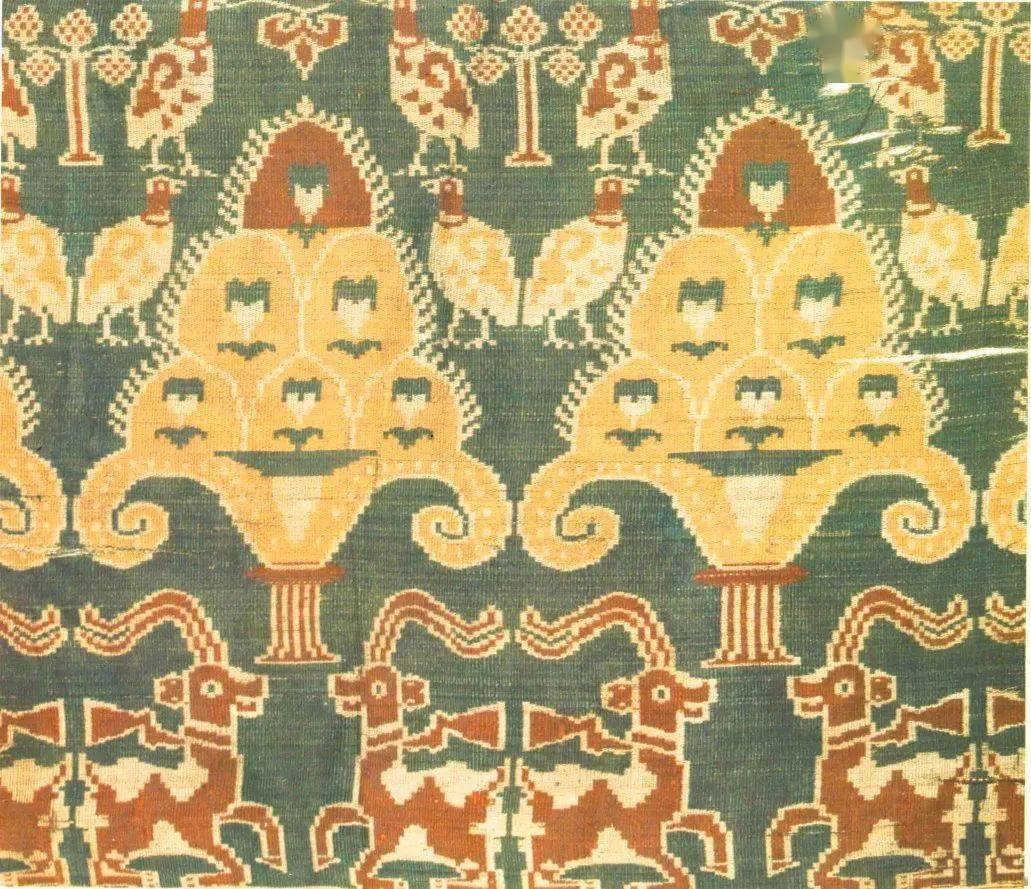
Animals and trees

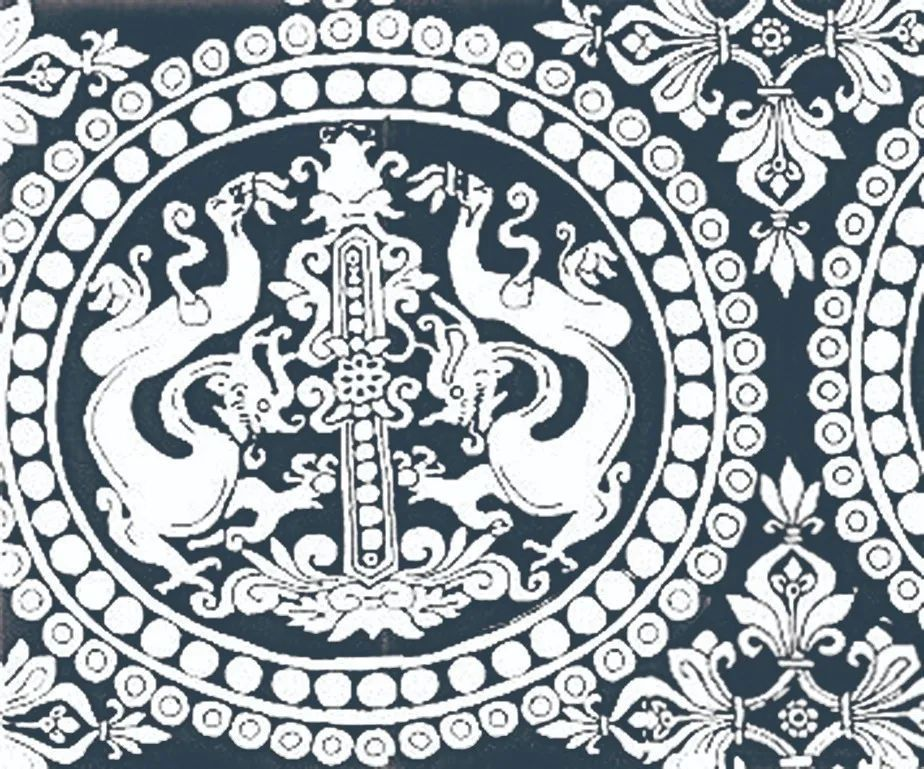
Double dragon within pearl roundels

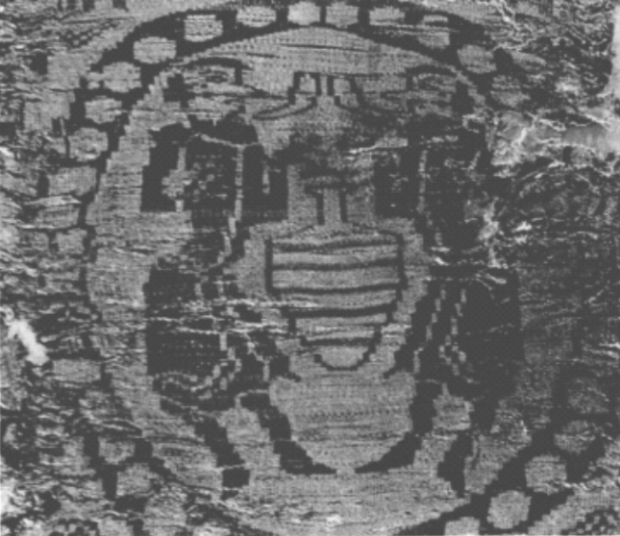
Drinking scene of two Byzantines or Central Asians within a pearl roundel

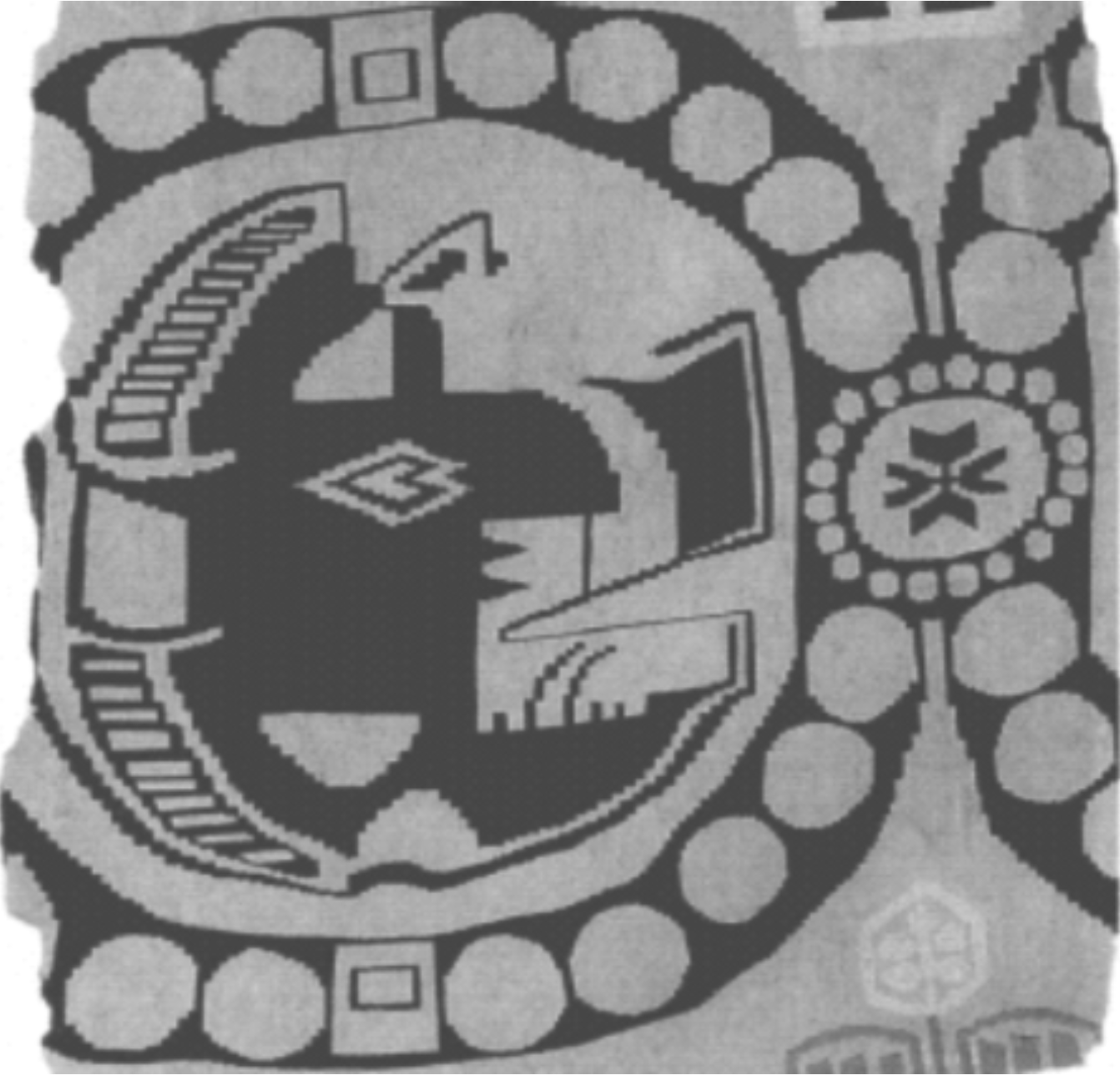
Boar head within a pearl roundel

=== Paintings ===
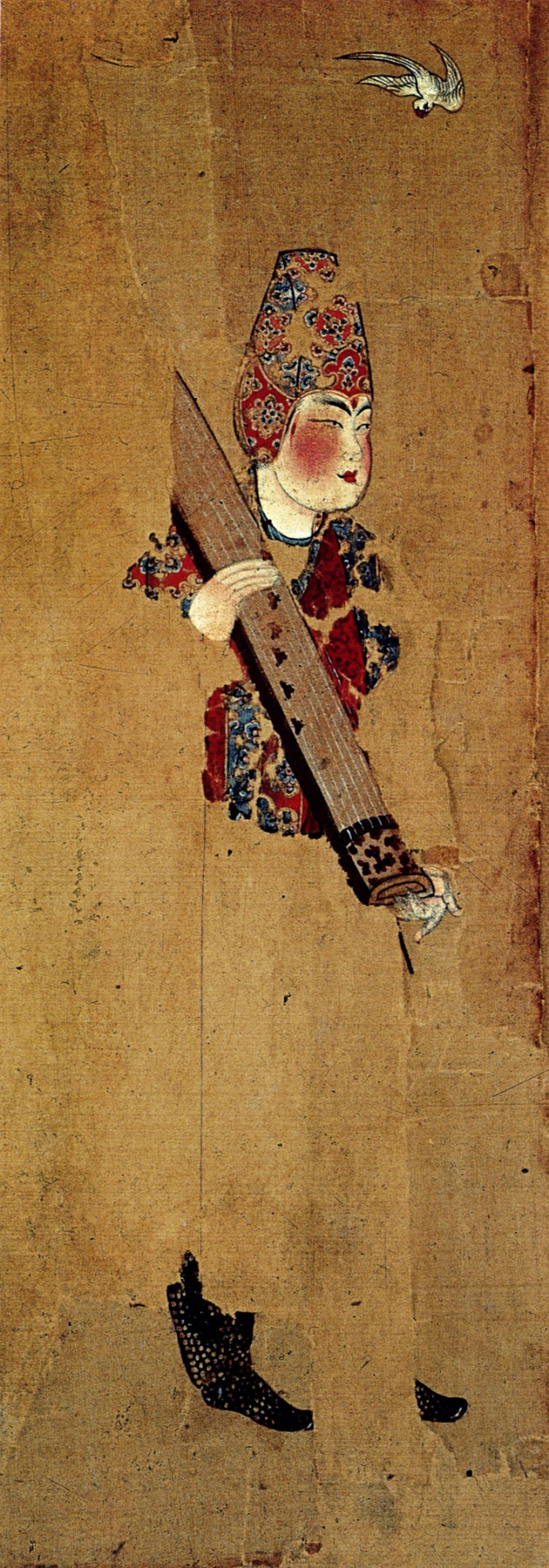
Tang dynasty musician

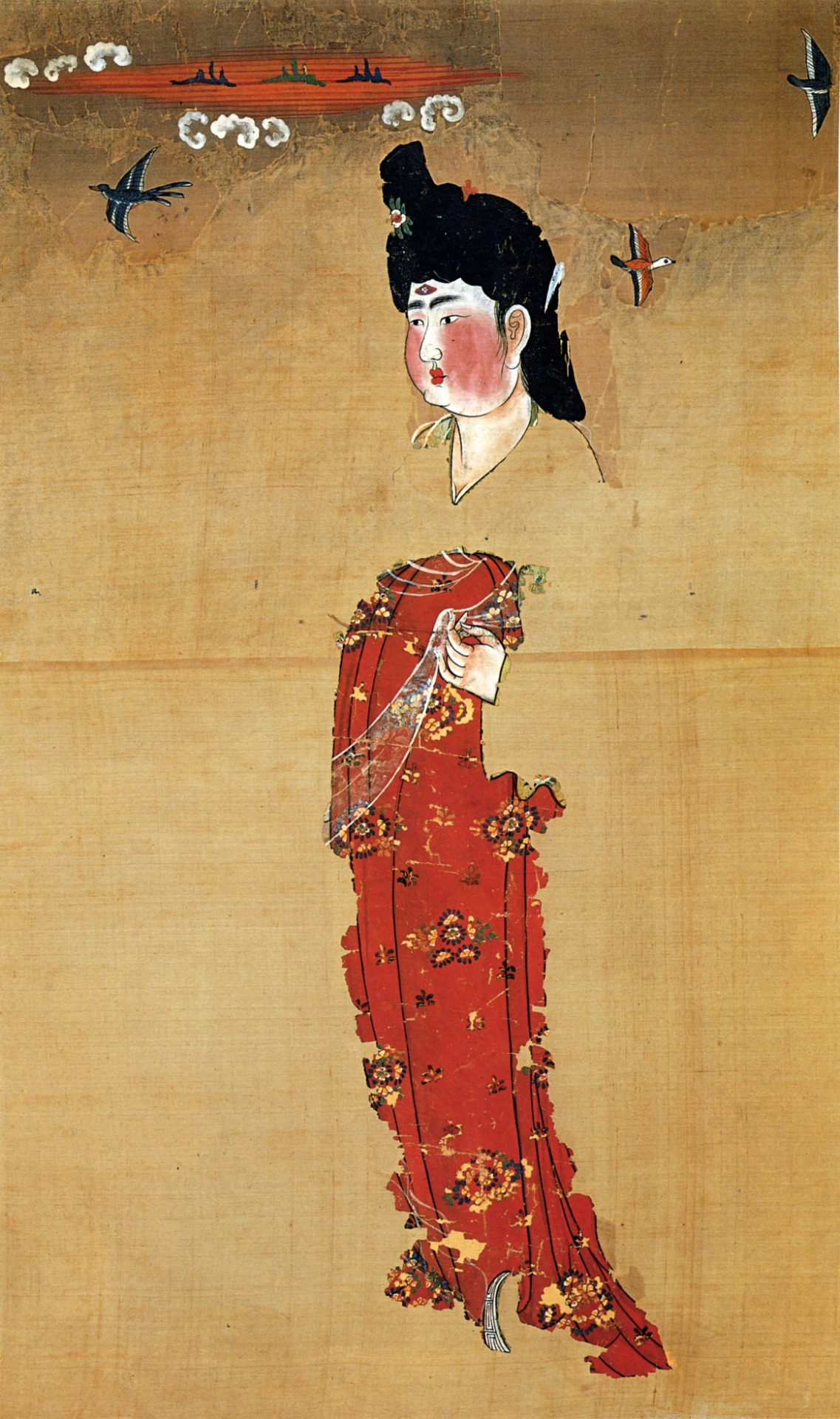
Woman

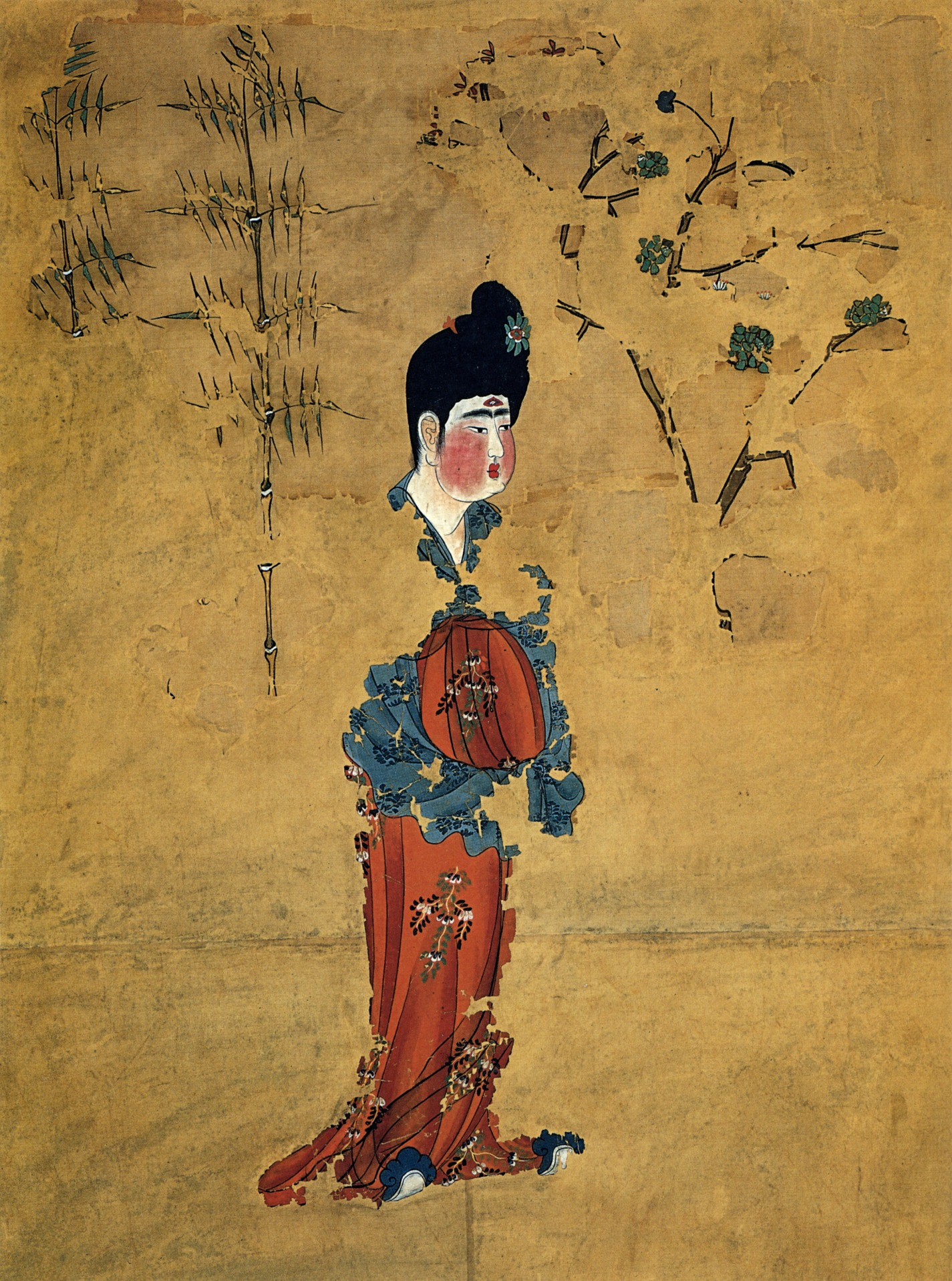
Courtesan

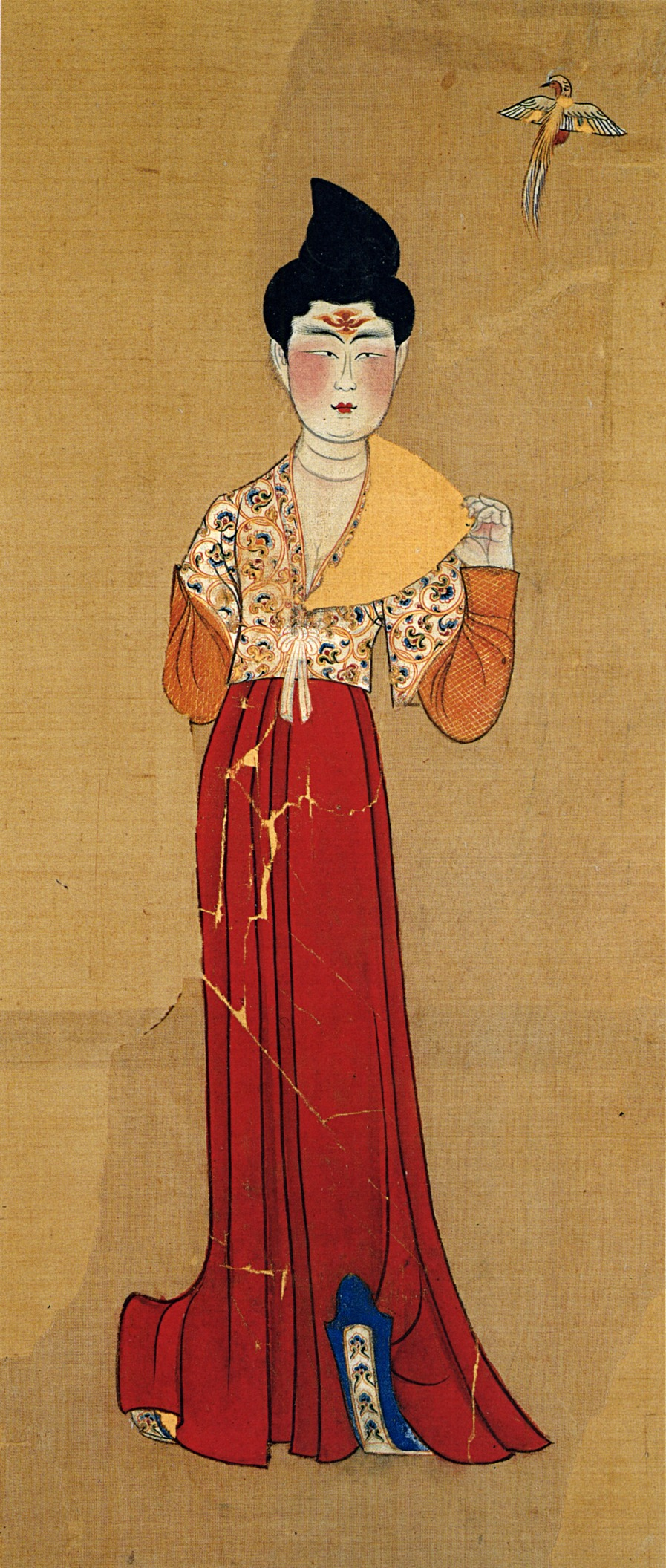
Dancer

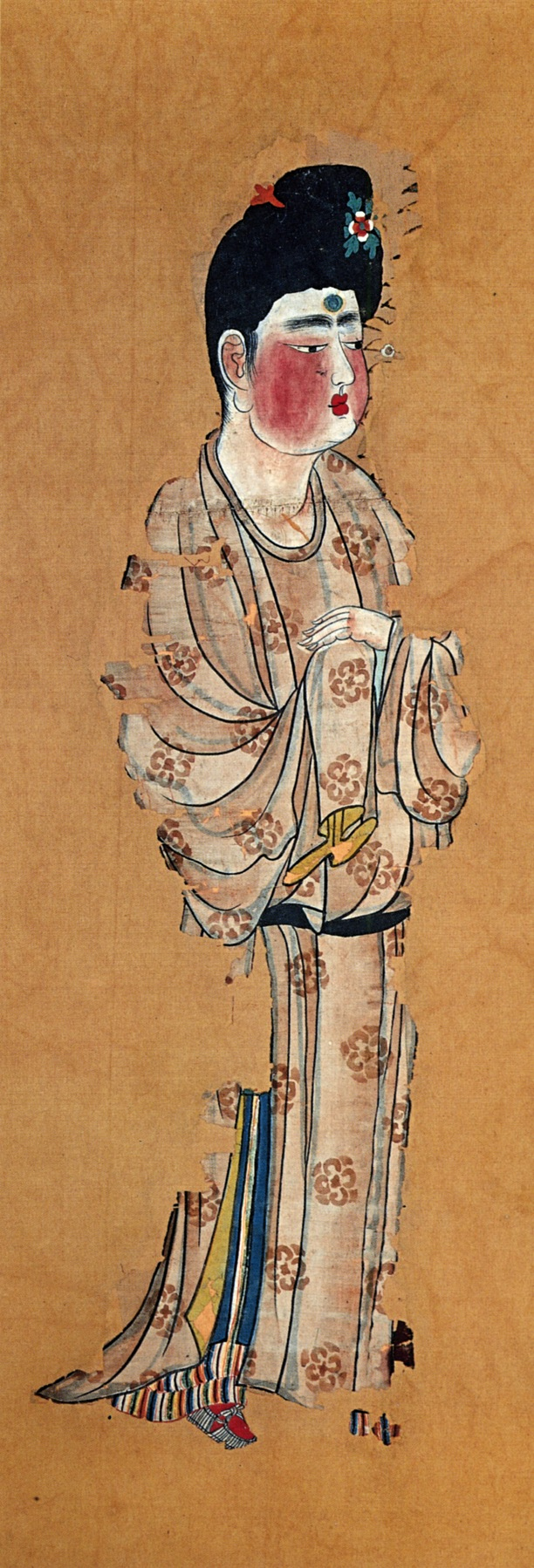
Servant

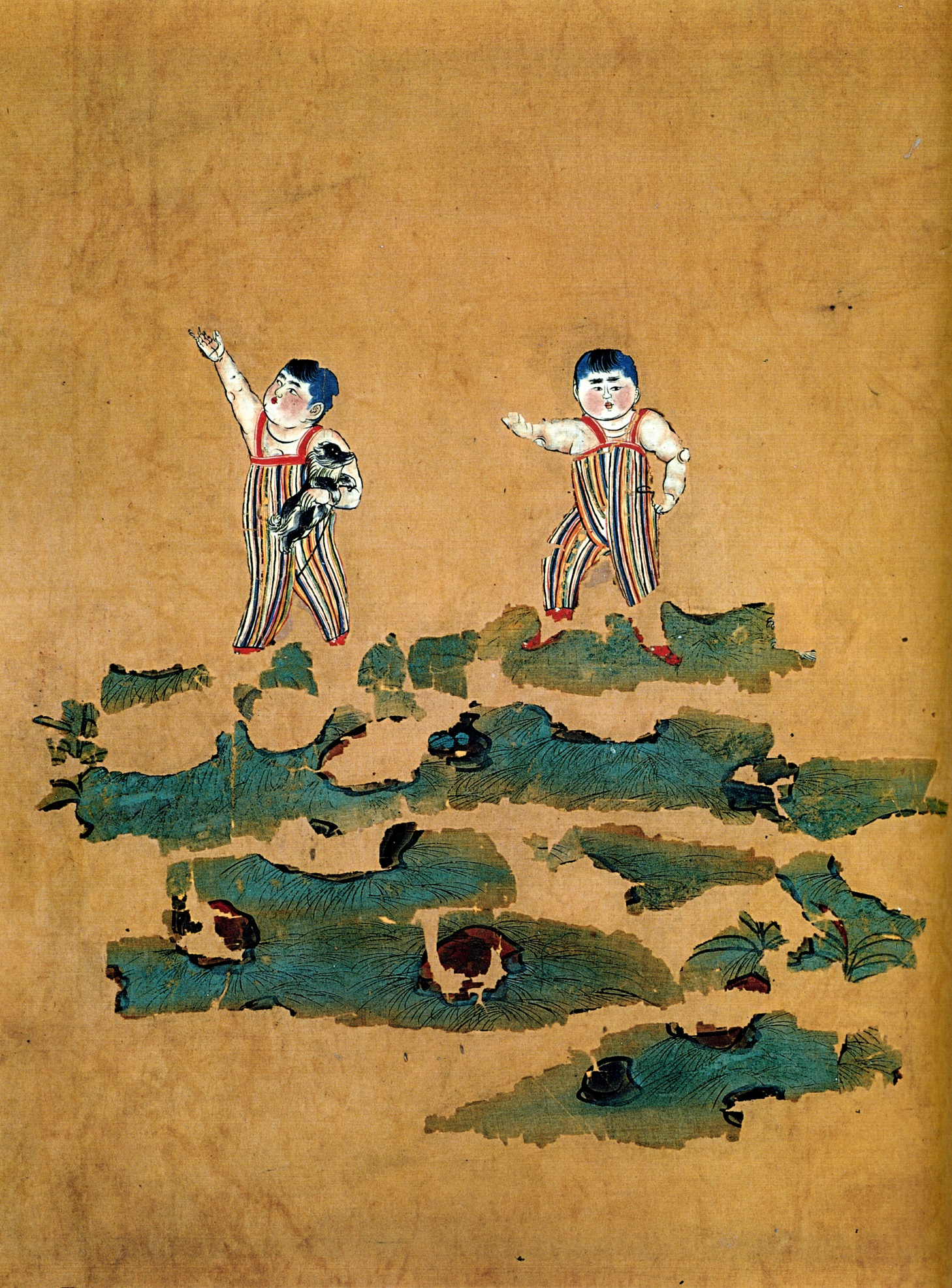
Children

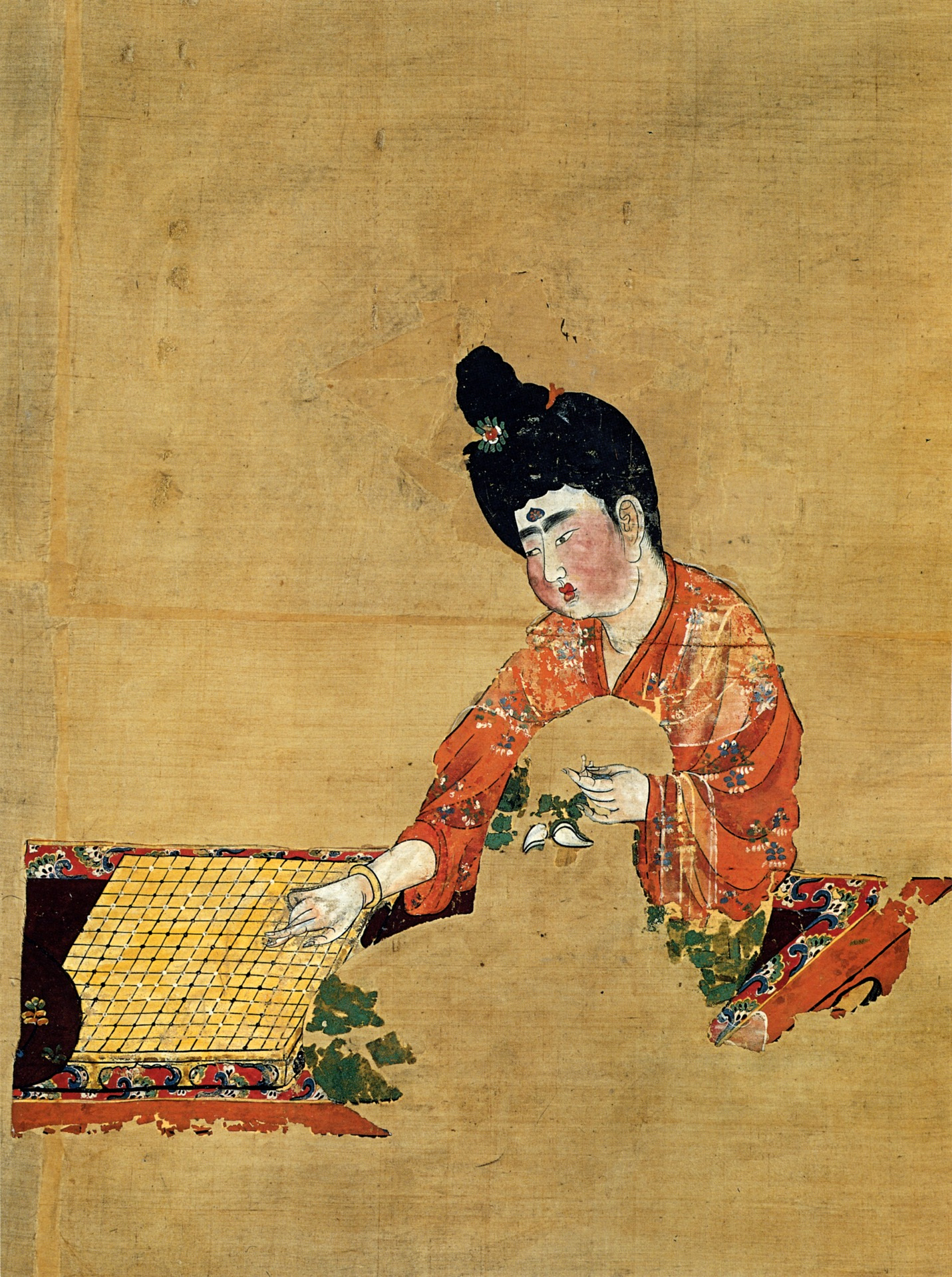
Weiqi player
