= DDZ =

DDZ may refer to

- Dalian Development Area, previously known as Dalian Development Zone
- The Dutch NS DDZ (Dubbel-Dekker-Zonering) trains, successor to the NS DD-AR of Nederlandse Spoorwegen
- DDZ Bridge over New Fork River, on the National Register of Historic Places listings in Sublette County, Wyoming
