= Jinzhou Museum (Dalian) =

Museum in Dalian, China

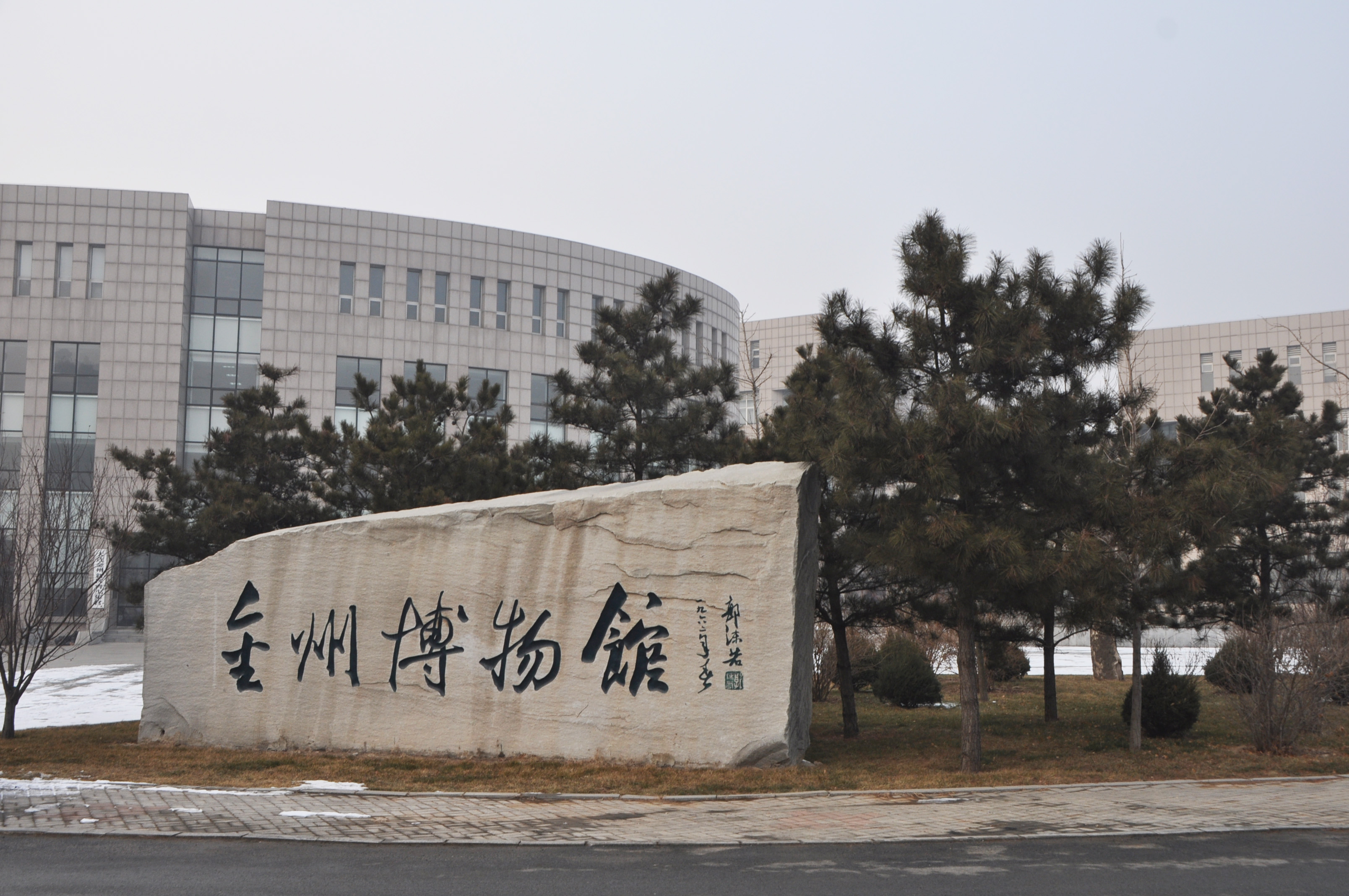
The Jinzhou Museum (in the back), Jinzhou Children's Palace (front left) and Jinzhou Library (front right)

The Jinzhou Museum (Chinese: 金州博物馆) is a museum located in Jinzhou District, Dalian City, Liaoning Province, China. This museum and the Lüshun Museum are the two historically important museums in Dalian.

== Background ==
Jinzhou, surrounded by walls, was historically the central town of Liaodong Peninsula, while Lüshun and Dalian are relatively new towns, being developed in the latter half of the 19th century and the 20th century, respectively. Historically important artifacts are in the Jinzhou Museum and the Lüshun Museum.

== The Old Museum ==
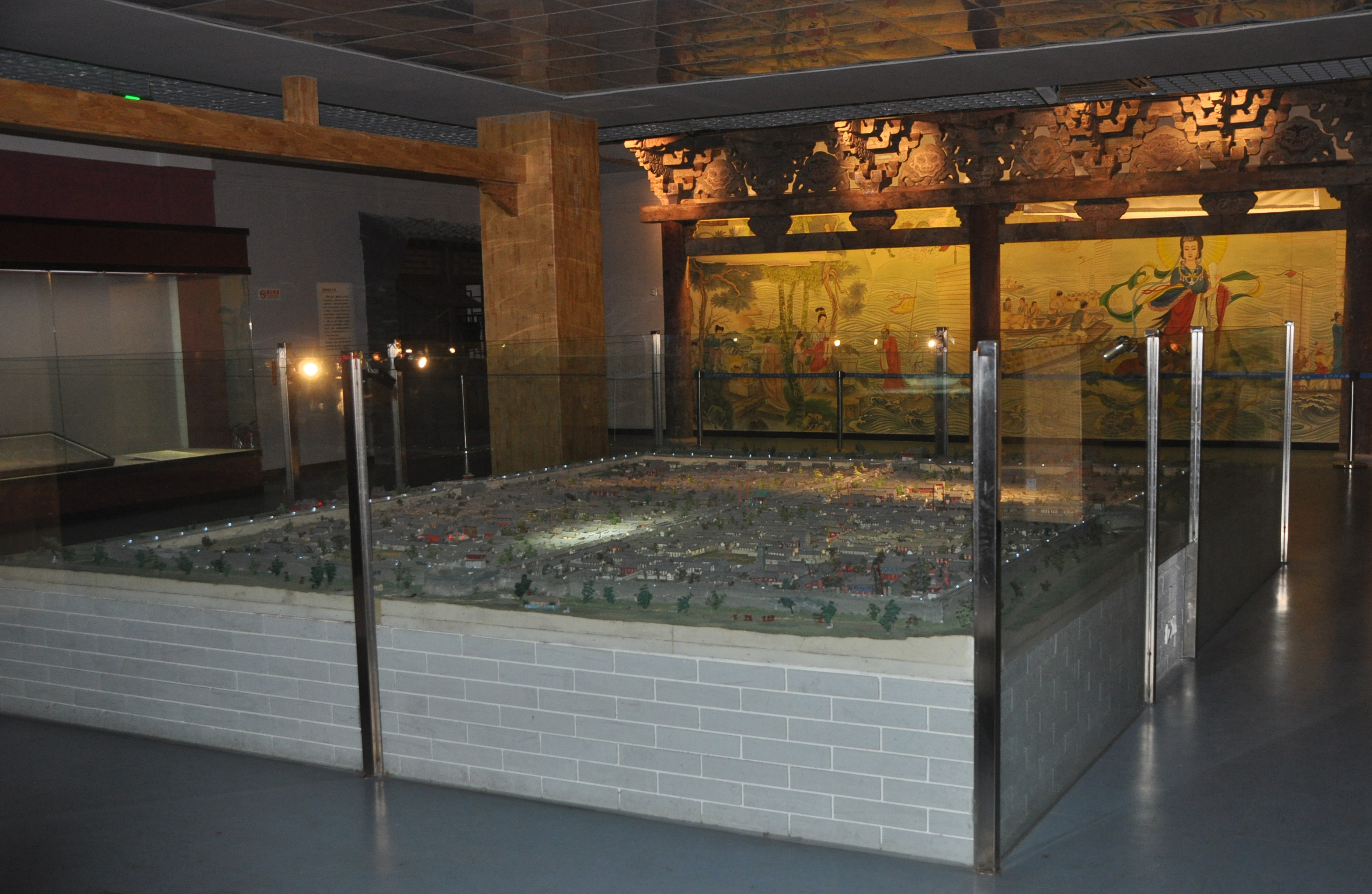
A model of the Walled Town in Jinzhou (Photo in the new museum)

The old Jinzhou Museum was established in 1928 during the time when Dalian, including Jinzhou, was Japan's leased territory, at the south gate of the walls (its current address: 61 Minzheng Street, 民主街61号) where there is now Xiangying Square (Chinese: 向应广场). It was part of the two-storeyed Jinzhou Town Hall.

In the museum was the model of the old walled town of Jinzhou. There were also the displays in Japanese of how the Japanese Army attacked and conquered Jinzhou in both Sino-Japanese and Russo-Japanese Wars, before they marched on to Lüshun. These displays were changed to Chinese when the People's Republic of China was established in 1945.

== The New Museum ==
The new Museum was built in the northern suburbs (its address: 888 Yong-an Boulevard, 永安大街888号) and was gradually opened in about 2010. Its location is for the public buildings where there are also the new Children's Palace and the new Library are.

The new museum is four-storeyed: on the first (ground) floor are the model of the old walled town of Jinzhou and other displays; on the 2nd floor are the early historical displays, such as dolmens; on the 3rd floor are the displays of the events during the Ming and Qing periods, including the First Sino-Japanese War and the Russo-Japanese War; and on the 4th floor are administrative offices.

Note: The Jinzhou Municipal Museum (Chinese: 锦州市博物馆) is located in Jinzhou, Liaoning.

== Jinzhou Futongweimen Museum ==
The Jinzhou Fu-Tongweimen Museum (Chinese: 金州副都统衙门博物馆), located at 255 Minzhu Street, is the place where the governor who defended and governed the Jinzhou area was sent from the central government of China. It became the police department during both Japanese occupation and PRC. In 1999 it was converted to a historical museum.

== See also ==
- Lüshun Museum
