= Jinzhou, Dalian =

Jinzhou 金州区 Kinchow
- District
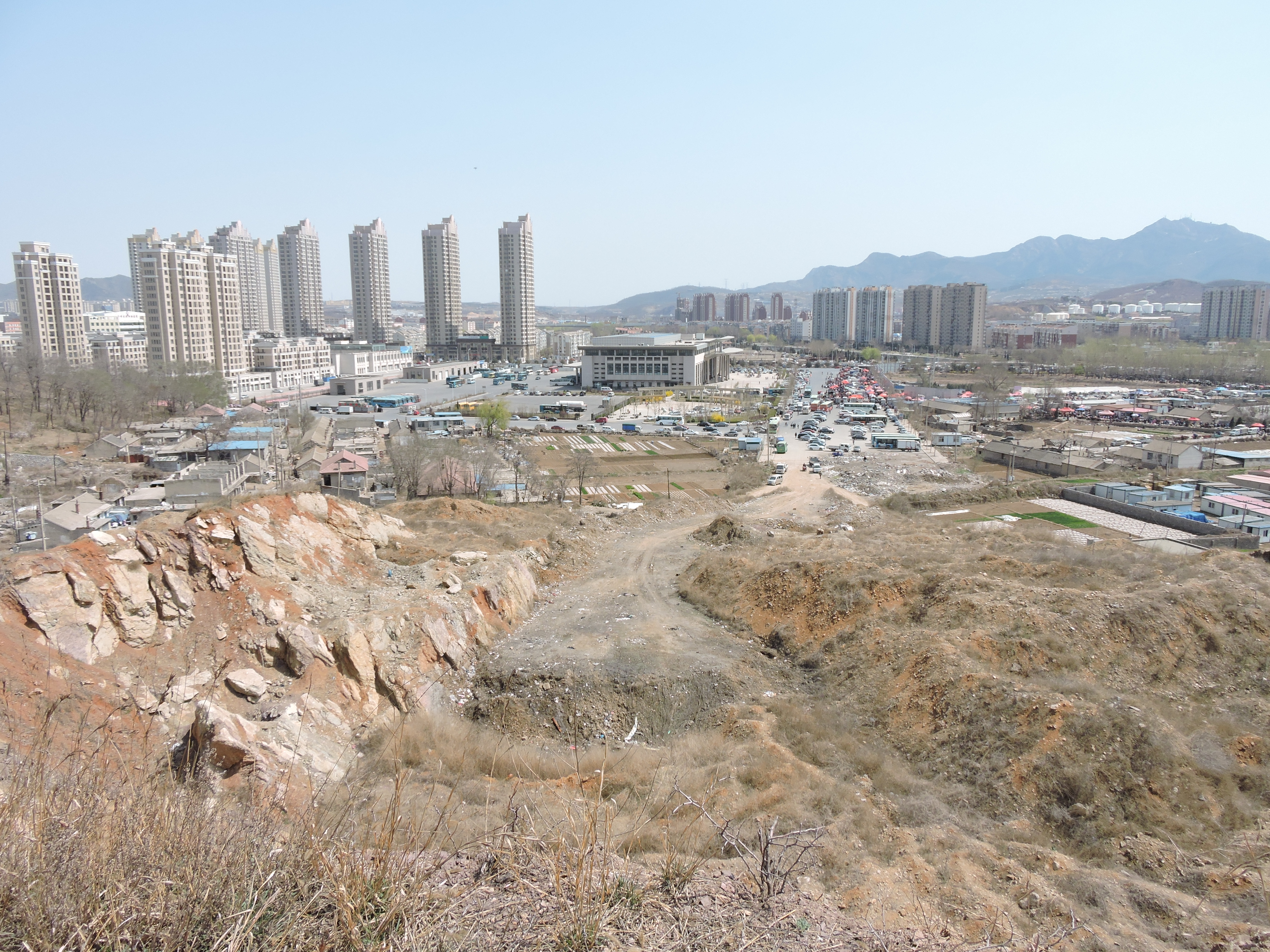

- Location in Liaoning
- Coordinates: 39°05′55″N 121°43′13″E
- Country: People's Republic of China
- Province: Liaoning
- Sub-provincial city: Dalian

Area
  - Total: 1,352.54 km^{2} (522.22 sq mi)

Population (2020)
  - Total: 1,545,491
  - Density: 1,142.66/km^{2} (2,959.47/sq mi)
- Time zone: UTC+8 (China Standard)
- Postal code: 116100
- Division code: 210213

Jinzhou District (simplified Chinese: 金州区; traditional Chinese: 金州區; pinyin: Jīnzhōu Qū; lit. 'golden prefecture') is one of the seven districts of Dalian, Liaoning province, People's Republic of China. It is located about 20 kilometres (12 mi) northeast of the city centre and faces the Bohai Sea to the west as well as the Korea Bay to the east and has a longer history than Dalian itself, and used to be a thriving walled city where the officials of this area were dispatched from the central government. Recently, it is again a thriving town, having Dalian Development Area within its area as well as becoming a bedroom community to downtown Dalian. Its area is 1,352.54 square kilometres (522.22 sq mi) and its permanent population as of 2020 is 1,545,491.

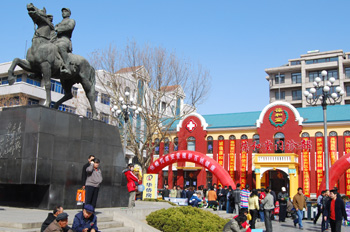
Xiangying Square in the center of Jinzhou, with Guan Xiangying's statue (left) and the former Museum turned a drugstore (back).

== History ==
Before Russia coerced a lease of the Lüshun Naval Port from the Qing dynasty and established Dalian as a commercial port in 1898, Jinzhou was the center of this region, a thriving walled town, to which the central government official was dispatched to rule this region.

- Three Kingdoms
  - A revolt in Liaodong Peninsula (239 A.D.)
- Tang, Song and Yuan dynasties
  - Emperor Li Shimin (Emperor Taizong of Tang) and his army campaigned against Goguryeu and captured the Bisa (Chinese: 卑沙, Beisha) fortification, on Dahei Mountain, Jinzhou (645).
  - Government official was sent to a town which was renamed Jinzhou (1218)
- Ming dynasty
- Qing dynasty
  - Japan occupied Liaodong Peninsula including Jinzhou during the Sino-Japanese War and tried to lease it (1894), but returned it as the results of the Triple Intervention by France, Germany and Russia, with Russia swiftly coercing a lease soon afterwards.
  - Japan re-occupied Liaodong Peninsula during the Russo-Japanese War (1904) and leases it as Kwantung Leased Territory (1905)
- Republic of China
  - Japan's lease agreement was extended to 99 years, until 1999 (1915)
  - The Soviet forces advanced to Jinzhou and the Communist Party-led Jinzhou Prefectural Government was established (1945)
- People's Republic of China
  - Jinzhou became part of Lüda City (旅大市) (1950)
  - After becoming part of Liaonan Special Zone (1966), Jinzhou was returned to Lüda City (1969), which was later renamed as Dalian City (1981)

== Geography ==
- 1074.6 square kilometers of land
- 20 kilometers northeast of the downtown Dalian
- Pulandian District to the north, Ganjingzi District to the south, the Yellow Sea to the east and the Bohai Sea to the west
- Highest point: Dahei Mountain, 662 meters above sea level
- In winter, the Yellow Sea side of Jinzhou District does not freeze, but the Bohai Sea side freezes in January and February

== Administrative divisions ==
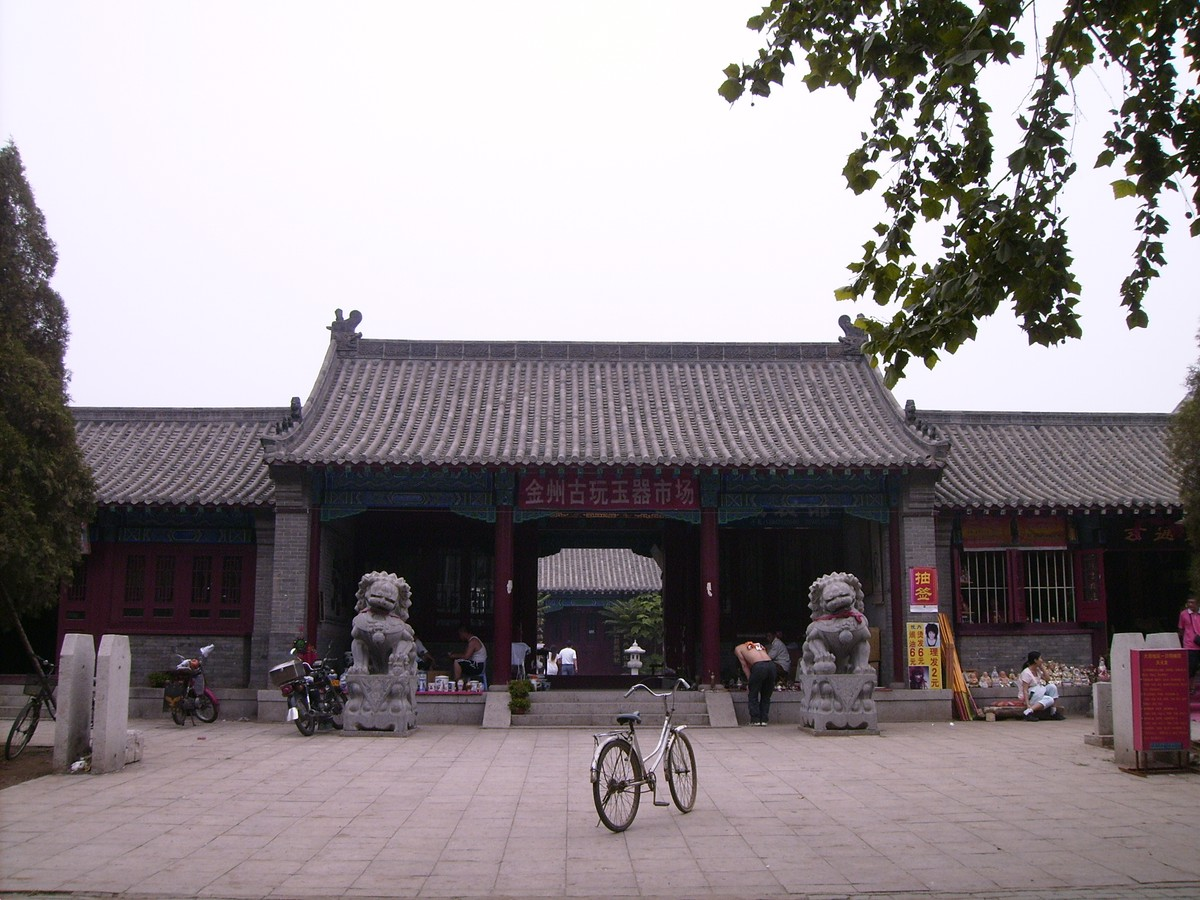
The former yamen of the Jinzhou fudutong

There are 25 subdistricts within the district.

Subdistricts:

- Yongzheng Subdistrict (拥政街道)
- Youyi Subdistrict (友谊街道)
- Guangzhong Subdistrict (光中街道)
- Maqiaozi Subdistrict (马桥子街道)
- Haiqingdao Subdistrict (海青岛街道)
- Dagushan Subdistrict (大孤山街道)
- Zhanqian Subdistrict (站前街道)
- Xianjin Subdistrict (先进街道)
- Dongjiagou Subdistrict (董家沟街道)
- Jinshitan Subdistrict (金石滩街道)
- Wanli Subdistrict (湾里街道)
- Ershilipu Subdistrict (二十里堡街道)
- Liangjiadian Subdistrict (亮甲店街道)
- Dengshahe Subdistrict (登沙河街道)
- Daweijia Subdistrict (大魏家街道)
- Xingshu Subdistrict (杏树街道)
- Qidingshan Subdistrict (七顶山街道)
- Huajia Subdistrict (华家街道)
- Xiangying Subdistrict (向应街道)
- Dalijia Subdistrict (大李家街道)
- Desheng Subdistrict (得胜街道)
- Paotai Subdistrict (炮台街道)
- Fuzhouwan Subdistrict (复州湾街道)
- Sanshilipu Subdistrict (三十里堡街道)
- Shihe Subdistrict (石河街道)

== Climate ==
Climate data for Jinzhou, elevation 91 m (299 ft), (1991–2020 normals, extremes 1972–present)
Month	Jan	Feb	Mar	Apr	May	Jun	Jul	Aug	Sep	Oct	Nov	Dec	Year
Record high °C (°F)	9.7 (49.5)	16.3 (61.3)	21.4 (70.5)	27.0 (80.6)	31.0 (87.8)	38.1 (100.6)	35.8 (96.4)	39.1 (102.4)	31.8 (89.2)	27.1 (80.8)	20.4 (68.7)	15.6 (60.1)	39.1 (102.4)
Mean daily maximum °C (°F)	−0.2 (31.6)	2.4 (36.3)	8.1 (46.6)	15.2 (59.4)	21.1 (70.0)	25.0 (77.0)	27.7 (81.9)	28.3 (82.9)	24.8 (76.6)	18.1 (64.6)	9.7 (49.5)	2.6 (36.7)	15.2 (59.4)
Daily mean °C (°F)	−4.1 (24.6)	−1.5 (29.3)	4.0 (39.2)	10.8 (51.4)	16.7 (62.1)	21.1 (70.0)	24.4 (75.9)	25.0 (77.0)	21.0 (69.8)	14.0 (57.2)	5.7 (42.3)	−1.3 (29.7)	11.3 (52.4)
Mean daily minimum °C (°F)	−7.3 (18.9)	−4.7 (23.5)	0.5 (32.9)	7.1 (44.8)	13.0 (55.4)	17.9 (64.2)	21.8 (71.2)	22.2 (72.0)	17.5 (63.5)	10.1 (50.2)	2.0 (35.6)	−4.7 (23.5)	8.0 (46.3)
Record low °C (°F)	−19.8 (−3.6)	−17.6 (0.3)	−9.4 (15.1)	−2.6 (27.3)	5.5 (41.9)	10.7 (51.3)	16.4 (61.5)	14.8 (58.6)	4.8 (40.6)	−3.4 (25.9)	−11.6 (11.1)	−15.9 (3.4)	−19.8 (−3.6)
Average precipitation mm (inches)	3.7 (0.15)	7.1 (0.28)	10.5 (0.41)	33.6 (1.32)	52.5 (2.07)	67.1 (2.64)	120.7 (4.75)	160.7 (6.33)	49.7 (1.96)	32.7 (1.29)	20.6 (0.81)	7.4 (0.29)	566.3 (22.3)
Average precipitation days (≥ 0.1 mm)	2.3	2.4	3.0	5.5	6.5	7.7	9.4	8.9	5.5	5.7	4.7	3.4	65
Average snowy days	3.9	2.8	1.5	0.3	0	0	0	0	0	0.2	2.2	4.3	15.2
Average relative humidity (%)	55	57	55	57	63	74	82	79	68	62	60	57	64
Mean monthly sunshine hours	182.4	174.5	223.6	233.7	251.0	216.5	177.8	188.1	214.5	203.0	157.6	163.3	2,386
Percentage possible sunshine	60	57	60	59	56	49	40	45	58	59	53	56	54
Source: China Meteorological Administrationall-time June and extreme (and August) temperature

== Transportation ==
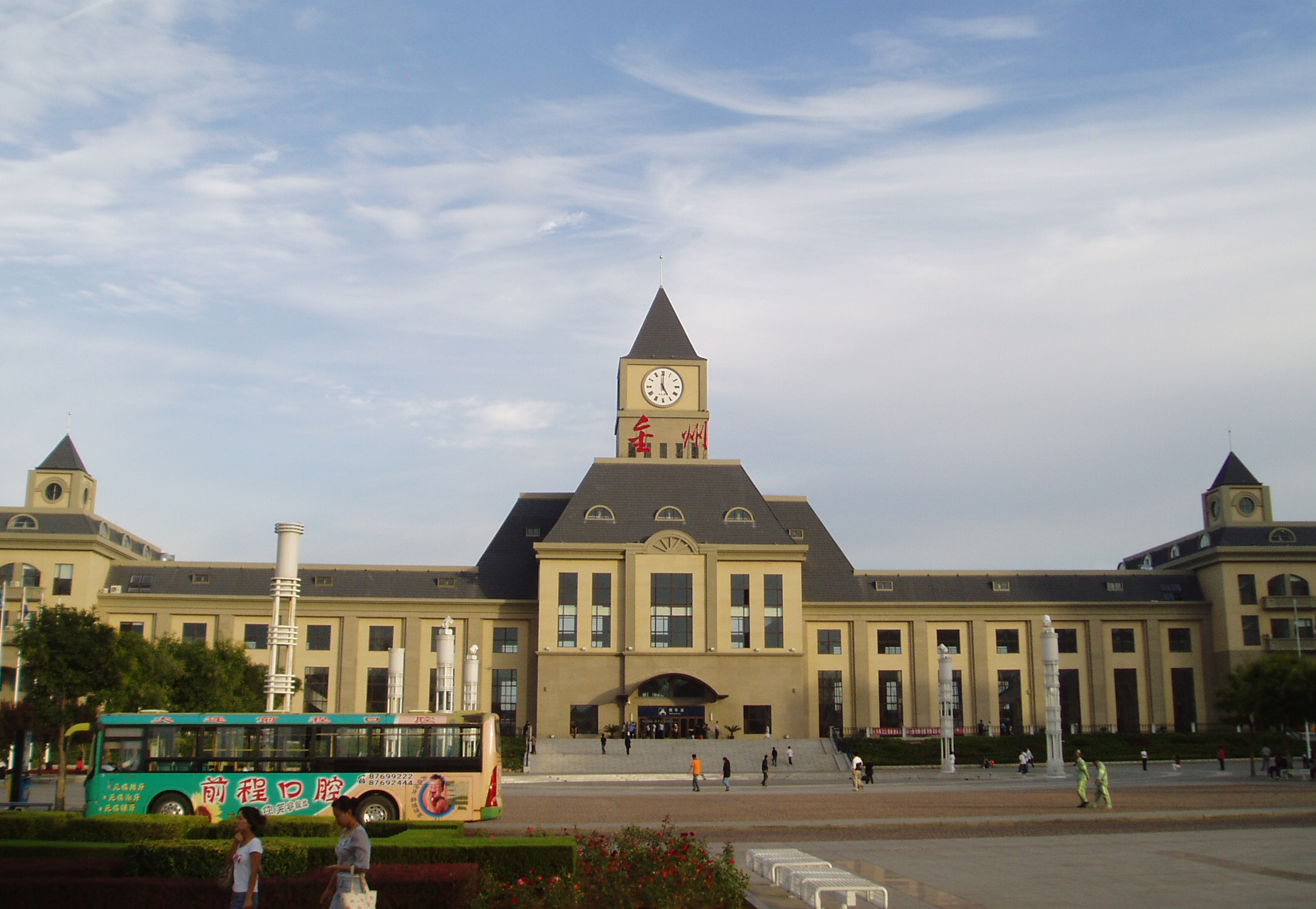
Jinzhou railway station

- Jinzhou Railway Station on the Dalian-Shenyang-Harbin Railway (former South Manchurian Railway)
- Dalian-Shenyang-Harbin and Dalian-Dandong-Shenyang Expressways
- Dalian Railway Station-Dalian Development Area-Golden Pebble Beach (Line 3 of Dalian Metro)

== Education ==
Colleges and Universities

- Dalian University
- Dalian Minzu University

International schools

- Dalian Maple Leaf International School
- Dalian Korean International School (KO)
- Dalian American International School

== Tourism ==
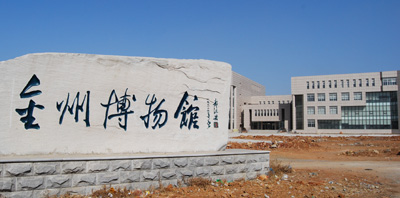
Jinzhou's New Museum.

- Xiangying Square and Stalin Road for Pedestrians only
- Former government official's office
- Jinzhou Museum, newly built in north of Jinzhou District
- Longwang Taoist Temple, Jinzhou Christian Church, etc.
- South Hills, a Russo-Japanese War battleground
- Dahei Mountain
- Jinzhou Bay (金州湾)
- Dalian Development Area
- Cannon Hills, East Mountain Park, Kailun International Hot Spring Club, etc.
- Golden Pebble Beach (金石滩) Tourist Area
- Golden Pebble Beach Golf Course, Discovery Kingdom, etc.

=== Eight Views of Old Jinzhou ===
The Eight Views of Old Jinzhou are:

- Shengshui Temple (Buddhist, Dahei Mountain)
- Xiangshui Temple (Taoist, Dahei Mountain)
- Chaoyang Temple (Buddhist, Dahei Mountain)
- Beisha Castle (Dahei Mountain)
- Yuhuang Temple (Taoist)
- Diaojingtai
- Longwang Temple (Taoist)
- Mengzhen Cave

== See also ==
- Dalian
  - Jinzhou New Area
  - Dalian Development Area
- Liaoning Province
- Battle of Nanshan
- Jinzhou Museum (Dalian)
