= Lüshun Museum =

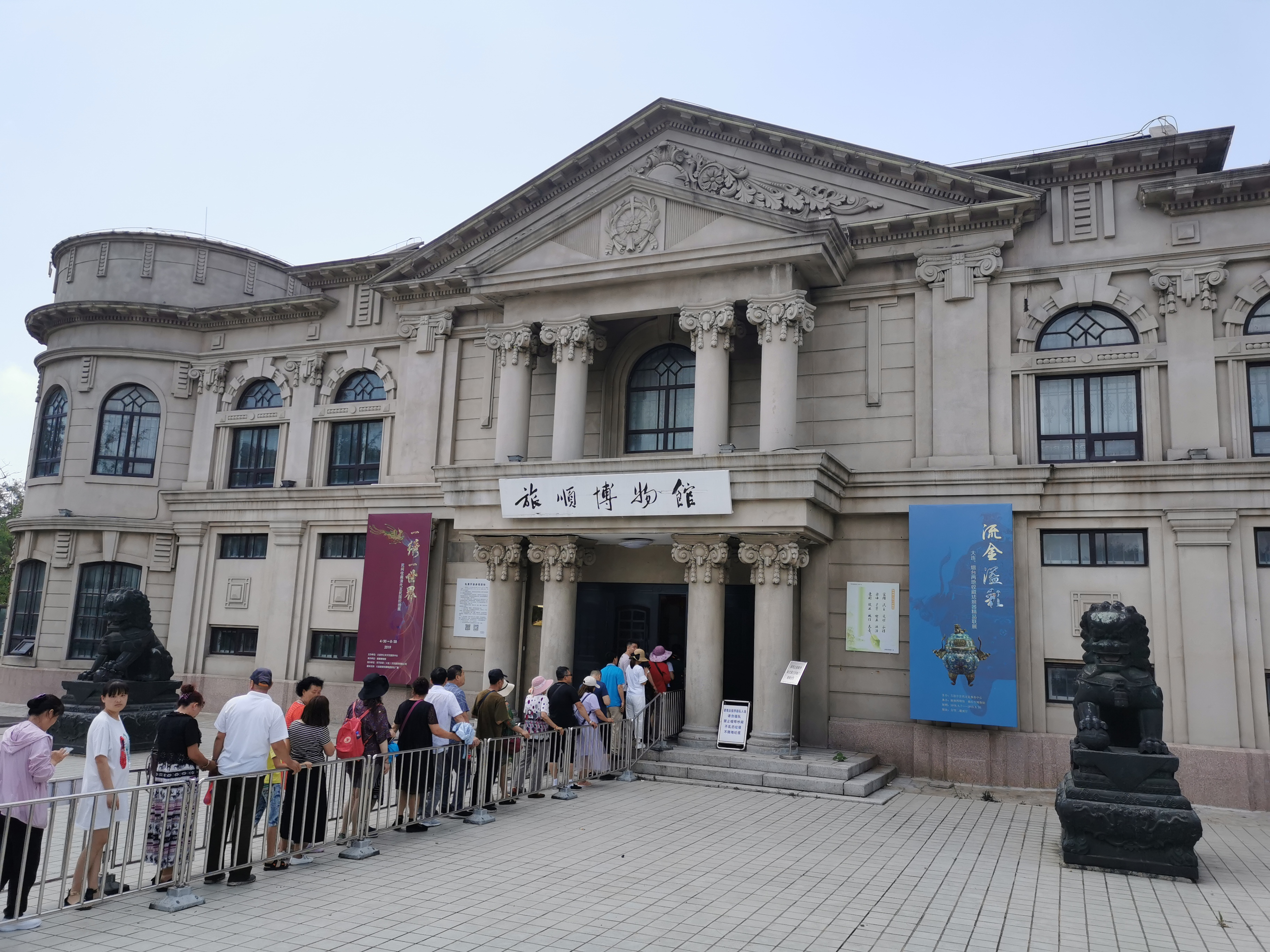
- Main Hall of Lüshun Museum

- Location of the museum Lüshun Museum (China)
- Established: 1915
- Location: Lüshunkou District, Dalian, Liaoning, China
- Coordinates: 38.808272°N 121.233833°E
- Type: History museum

The Lüshun Museum (Chinese: 旅顺博物馆) is a museum in Lüshunkou District, Dalian, Liaoning, China. It was established in 1915 when this area was Japan's leased territory and is known for its exhibit of the mummies that Kozui Otani collected during his expeditions 1901–10 to Central Asia.

== History ==
Important dates in the museum's history include:

- November 1915: The Products Exhibition Hall
- April 1917: Guandong Capital's Manchurian & Mongolian Products Exhibition Hall
- December 1934: The Lushun Museum
- January 1951: The Soviet Union Government returned the "Lushun Eastern Culture Museum" to the Chinese Government
- December 1952: The Lushun Museum of History and Culture
- May 1972: Reopened after the closure during the Great Cultural Revolution
- October 1999: Lushun Museum implemented the overall renovation project. Half of the botanical garden, zoo and the Lushun Museum Park merged, the park expanded to 150,000 square meters, and the comprehensive maintenance of main building.
- April 2001, the Lushun Museum branch finished and opened, the basic display for the "ancient civilization in Dalian" and "collection of foreign cultural relics exhibit."
- May 2008, the Lushun Museum was declared the first batch of "State-level Museum" by the State Administration of Cultural Heritage.
- 2014, the Lushun Museum was awarded the "Science and Technology Popularization Base of Liaoning Province" by the Office of Science and Technology of Liaoning Province.

== See also ==
- Dalian Modern Museum
- Guandong Leased Territory
- Kozui Otani
