= Jinzhou New Area =

Jinzhou New Area (simplified Chinese: 金州新区; traditional Chinese: 金州新區) is an unofficial new district under the administration of Dalian, Liaoning, People's Republic of China, located in the south-central portion of Jinzhou District. It was created on 29 April 2010.

== Overview ==
Jinzhou New District across the Bohai Sea and the Yellow Sea is in the north of the main urban area in Dalian. It covers a land area of 1040 square kilometers with a coastline of 322 kilometers. It has a permanent resident population of 1.1 million and at least 20 streets in its jurisdiction. In order to show the advantages of cluster development and dynamic development and further accelerate the process of regional urbanization in Dalian, Dalian Municipal Committee and Municipal Government made a decision that Jinzhou District and Dalian Economic and Technical Development Zone, including Export Processing Zone and Golden Pebble Beach National 5A Tourist Resort, were merged into Jinzhou New District on 9 April 2010.

== Development ==
Jinzhou New Area, or Jinpu New Area

== See also ==
- Jinzhou District
- Dalian Development Area
- Jinzhou New Area Stadium
