= Dahei Mountain =

Mountain in Liaoning, China

Coordinates: 39°06′14″N 121°46′52″E

- 大黑山 • Dàhēi Shān
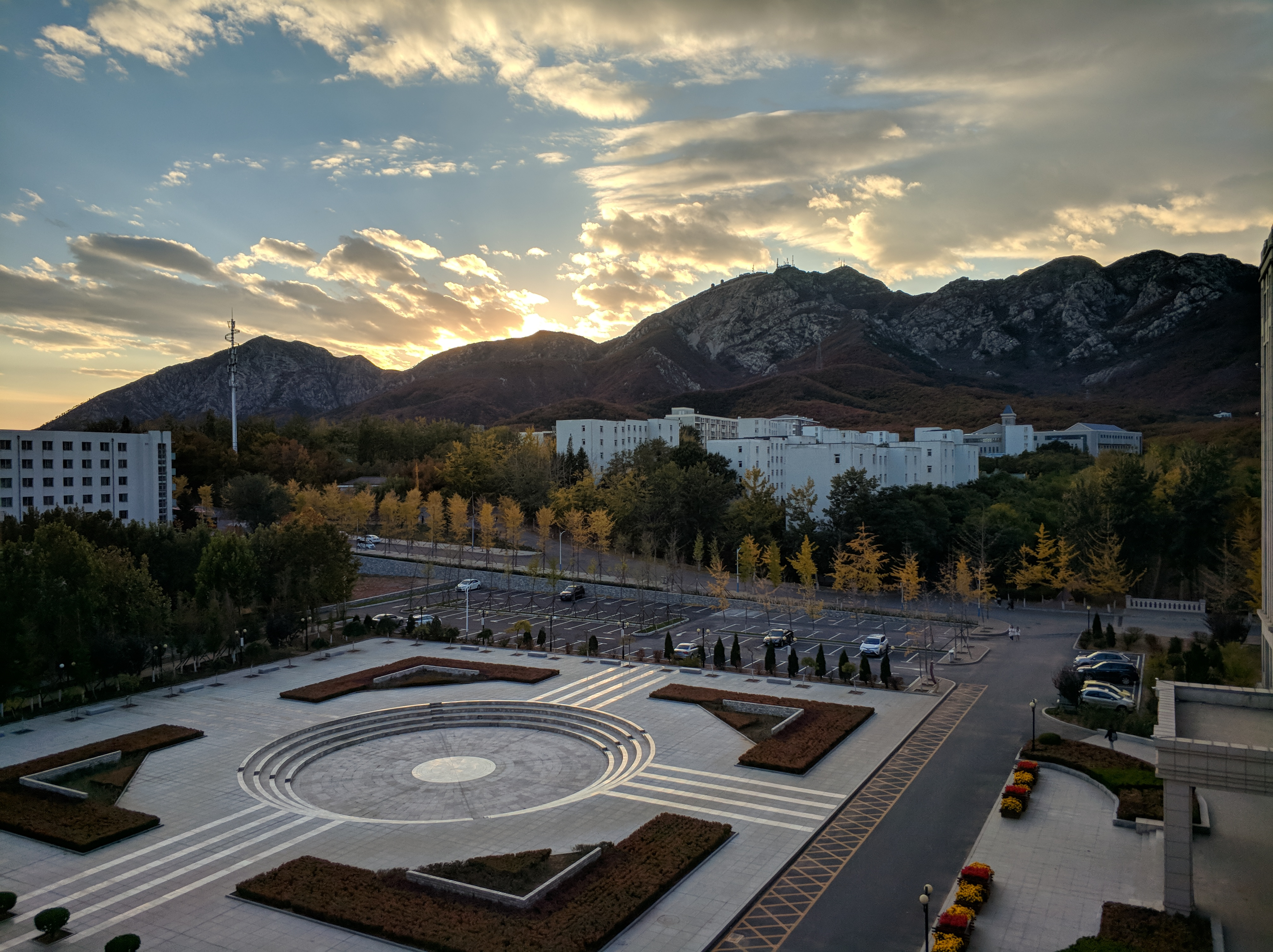
- Dahei Mountain, viewed from the campus of Dalian University

Highest point
- Elevation: 663 m (2,175 ft)
- Listing: Highest in Dalian's 6 Districts

Geography
- Parent range: Qianshan Mountains

Dahei Mountain (Chinese: 大黑山; pinyin: Dàhēi Shān) is located in Jinzhou District, Dalian, Liaoning province, China. Its peak is 663 metres above sea level. It belongs to the Qianshan Mountains, named after Qian Mountain in Anshan, that extends themselves from the Changbai Mountains.

It is the highest mountain in the southern Liaodong Peninsula.

== See also ==
- Dalian City
- Jinzhou District
- Dalian University, which campus located at the foot of the mountain.
