= Dalian Discovery Kingdom =

Amusement park in Dalian, China

Dalian Discovery Kingdom 大连发现王国
- Interactive map of Dalian Discovery Kingdom 大连发现王国
- Location: Dalian, Liaoning, China
- Coordinates: 39.081665°N 121.999269°E
- Opened: 2006
- Operating season: Late June to Early September

Attractions
- Total: Around 20
- Roller coasters: 3d
- Water rides: 2
- Website: Official Website of Discoveryland

Dalian Discovery Kingdom (Chinese: 大连发现王国; pinyin: Dàlián Fāxiàn Wángguó), also translated as Dalian Discoveryland or Kingdom of Discovery, is an amusement park located at Jinshitan National Holiday Resort in Jinzhou District, Dalian, Liaoning, China. Opened in 2006, it is currently the largest amusement park in Liaoning.

== Attractions ==
The Discoveryland is divided into six themed areas: Crazy Town, Mysterious Desert, Metal Factory, Magic Forest, Legend Castle and Wedding Palace. As of 2014, the theme park features three sets of roller coasters, two water rides, a vertical drop tower and other attractions which make up approximately twenty rides in total. The most notable feature of the park is a giant stony-looking fortress built within a small lake in the centre. During the theme parks' opening season a parade roams through the internal paths at noon everyday, entertaining the visitors. At night fireworks are set off for the leaving visitors seeing their final exhibition. The theme park is closed during winter season.

== Gallery ==
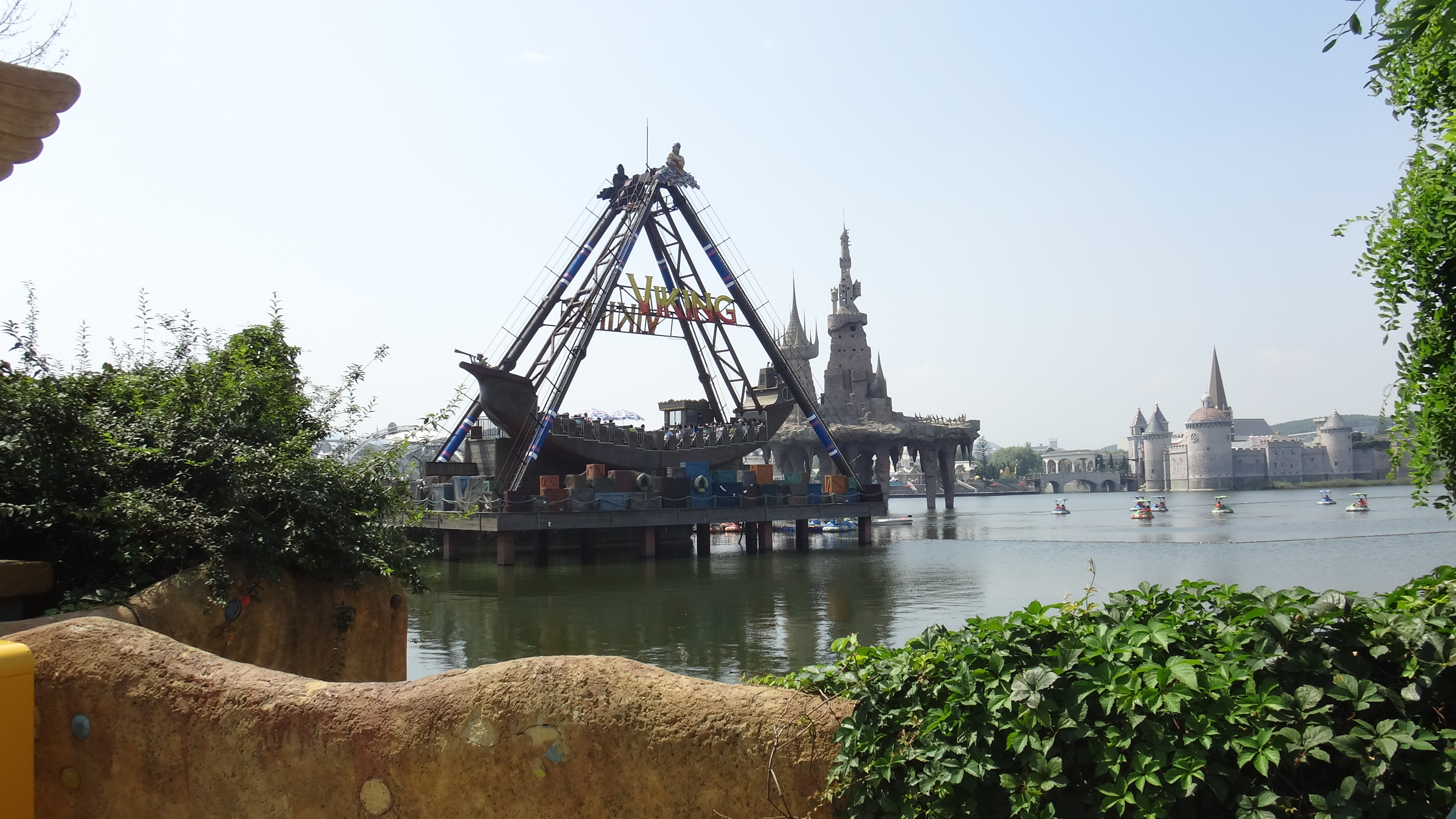
Pirate Ship

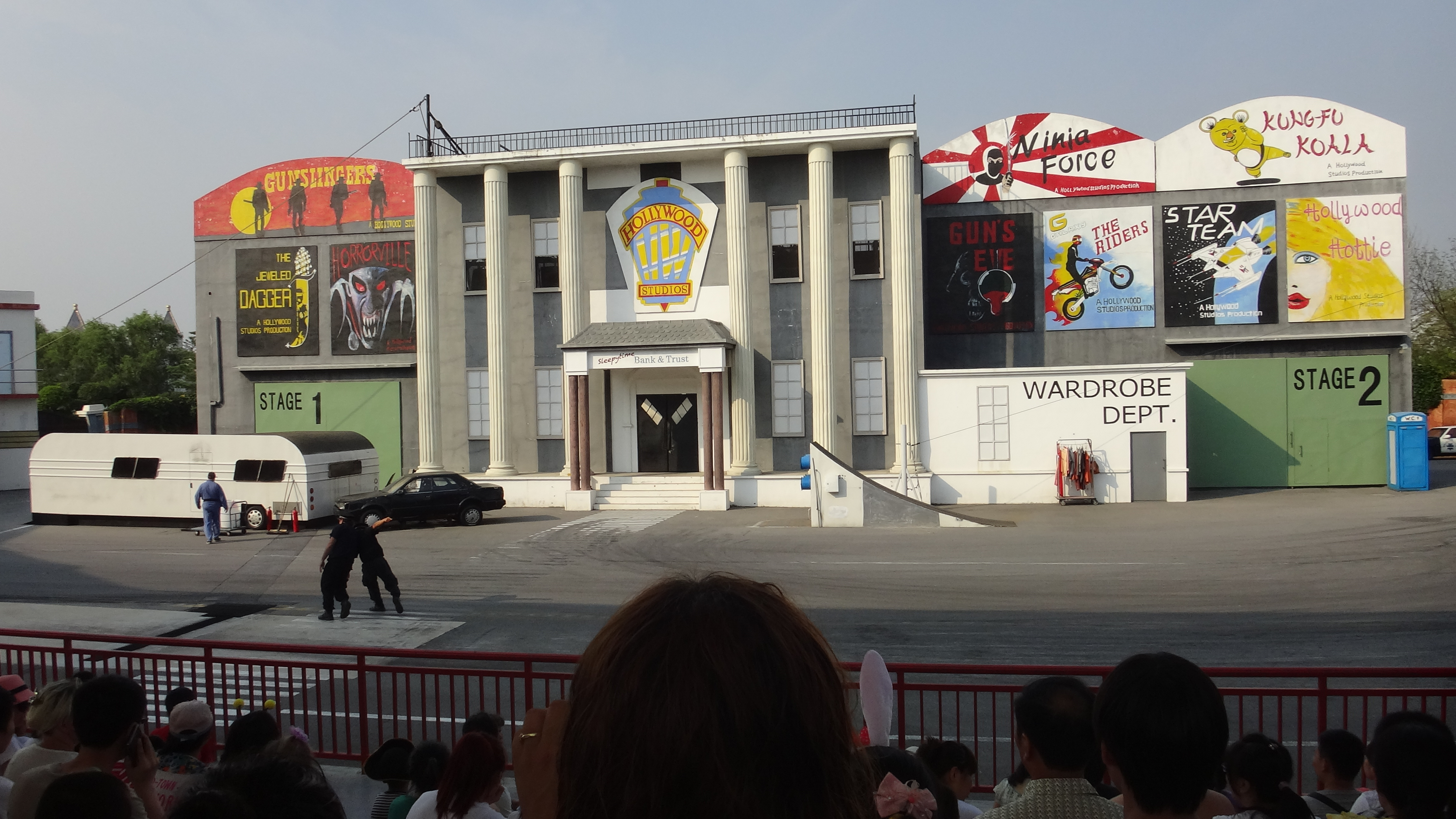
Crazy Town

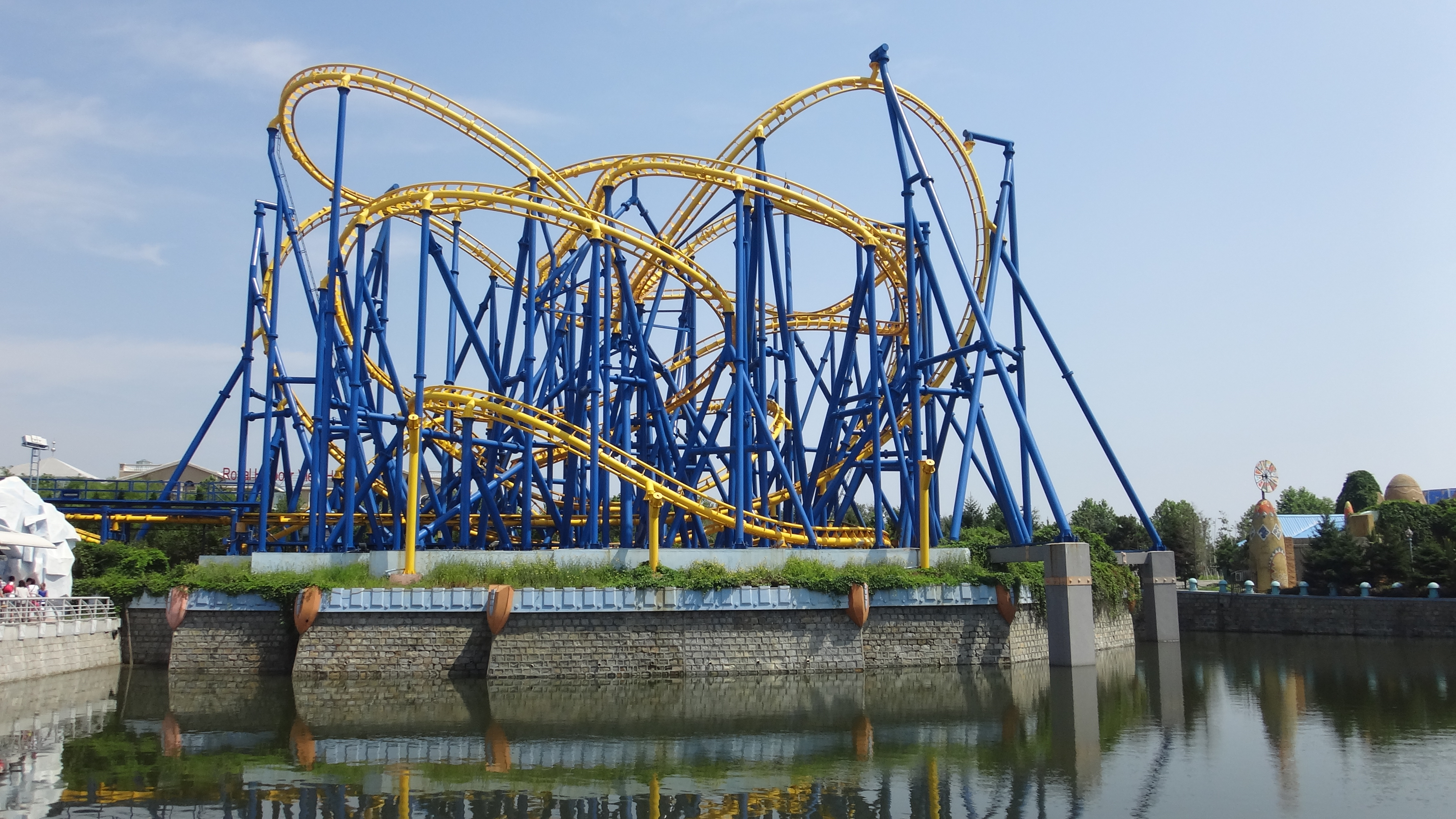
Crazy Cobra Roller Coaster
