= Dalian Development Area =

Area in Jinzhou District, Dalian, China

Coordinates: 39.0526°N 121.7875°E

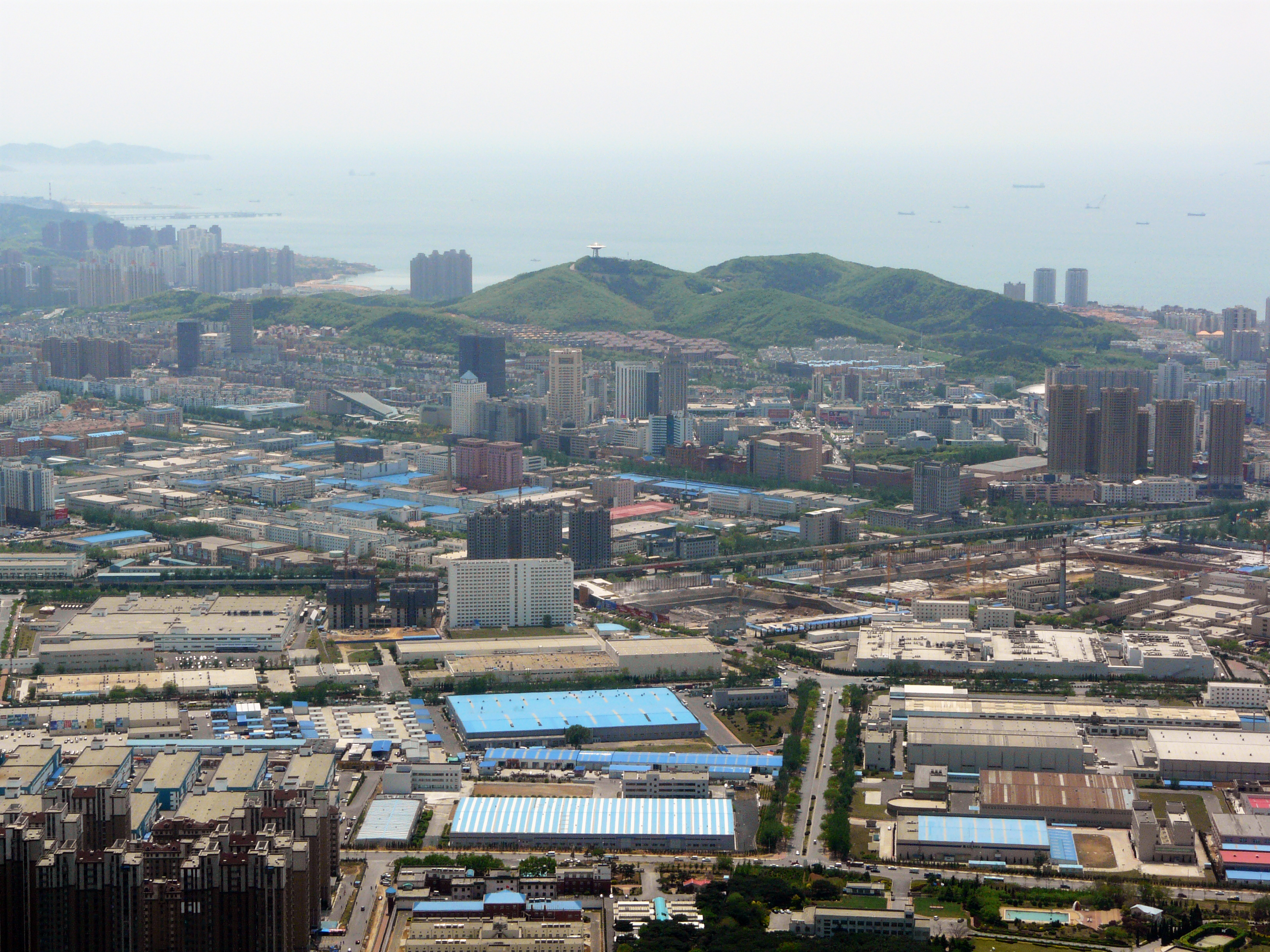
Dalian Development Area

Dalian Development Area (DDA; KaiFaQu Chinese: 大连开发区; pinyin: Dàlián kāifā qū) is located in Jinzhou District, Dalian, Liaoning province, China as the first Economic and Technological Development Zones nationwide in 1984.

== History ==
Kaifaqu was established in September, 1984 under the former name of Dalian Economic and technological Development Zone (Chinese: 大连经济技术开发区; pinyin: Dàlián jīngjì jìshù kāifā qū) or Dalian Development Zone (DDZ). The new name has been in place for several years, due to the much extended range of the territory including the Dalian Free Trade Zone (Chinese: 大连保税区; pinyin: Dàlián bǎoshuìqū) to the south and Dalian DD Port (Chinese: 双D港; pinyin: Shuāng D gǎng) to the east. The new name also reflects increased economic prosperity. Now Kaifaqu is a quickly expanding city, with a territory of 338 square kilometers, and a population of 360,000 including 31 ethnic groups: Han, Man, Hui, Chaoxian (Korean), Mongolian and other nationalities. On April 9, 2010, in order to fully demonstrate gathering advantage and development vitality and further accelerate the process of urbanization of Dalian, Dalian Municipal Committee and Municipal Government decided to combine Jinzhou District and Dalian Economic and Technical Development Zone (Export Processing Zone, Golden Pebble Beach National 5A-Level Tourism and Holiday Resort included) and found Jinzhou New District.

== Location ==
Kaifaqu is located to the north and east of Dalian's urban area. The distance between Dalian and DDA is about 30 kilometers. The city is within Jinzhou District, east of Jinzhou's urban center.

=== Dalian Free Trade Zone ===
To the south of the Development Zone is the Dalian Free Trade Zone.

=== Dalian DD Port ===
To the east of the Development Zone, on the way to Jinshitan, is the Dalian DD Port, taking its name from Digital and DNA of the Bio industry.

== Economy ==
DDA had a GDP of 70.31 billion yuan in 2007, a growth of over 2000 times since it was established 23 years ago in 1984. The total volume of import and export trade is 14.92 billion yuan, which accounts for a quarter of Liaoning Province's trade, or half of Dalian's. According to 2006 statistics, Kaifaqu has created a total of 1.4 billion yuan.

=== Industry ===
Most of the enterprises in DDA are factories owned by foreign companies, especially from Japan, South Korea, Germany and the USA. Canon, Pfizer, Toshiba, Volkswagen and Intel all have factories in DDA. Domestic companies also have factories there, including Haier, the biggest household appliance manufacturer of China and the fourth biggest in the world. At the end of 2013, 69 Fortune 500 enterprises established operations in the DDA.

=== Commercial ===
The corner of Jinma road and Benxi Street is a major shopping area, with Mykal and New Mart department stores, and other supermarkets and specialty stores.

There are many Western, Japanese and Korean restaurants as well as Chinese restaurants.

=== Preferential Tax Policies ===
Foreign Enterprises operating in the DDA receive preferential tax policies. The normal tax rate in the Liaoning Province is 30% for foreign enterprises, but in the DDA these firms are taxed at 15% and certain industries receive a rate of 10%. For those overseas students pioneering in Dalian, if they are using high and new technology achievements for production, their salaries earned in Dalian will be regarded as income outside China and they can enjoy preferential personal income tax policies.

== Education ==
Colleges and Universities

- Dalian University
- Dalian Nationalities University
- Continuous Education School and Software School, Dalian University of Technology
- DDA School, Dalian University of Foreign Languages

Other Special Schools

- Dalian Maple Leaf International School
- Dalian Korean International School
- Dalian American International School

== Entertainment ==
Nearby to the east of DDA is Dalian Jinshitan National Tourist Holiday Resort, where there are: Golden Pebble Beach (Jinshitan) International Golf Course, Discovery Kingdom, etc.. The Development Zone Cultural Square has a library, grand theatre, and an outside square.

== Transportation ==
It takes about 30 minutes to reach DDA from Dalian by car. There is Dalian Metro which connects DDA with the Dalian city center via Line 3 and Line 7 connects the DDA with the traditional Jinzhou Center. Its extension to Jinzhou has started service in December 2008 and to Lüshun is in the plan.

== See also ==
- Jinzhou New Area, or Jinpu New Area
- Dalian Hi-Tech Zone
- Dalian Software Park
