= Dalian University =

Provincial public university in Dalian, Liaoning, China

Coordinates: 39°05′58″N 121°49′01″E

- 大连大学
- Motto: 文明 自强 求是 创新
- Motto in English: Civilization Self-Improvement Truth-Seeking and Originality
- Type: Public University
- Established: 1987
- Location: Jinzhou District, Dalian, Liaoning, China
- Website: www.dlu.edu.cn

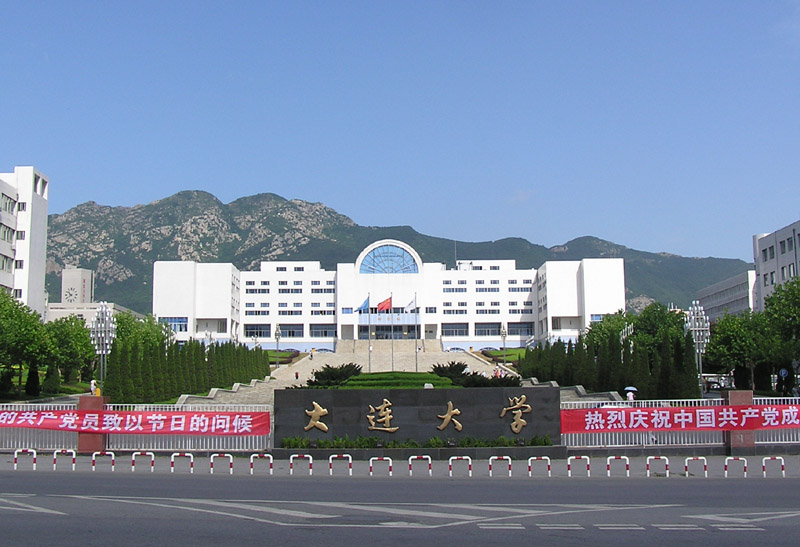
Dalian University with Dahei Mountain in the background

Dalian University (大连大学) is a provincial public university in Dalian, Liaoning, China. It is affiliated with the Province of Liaoning. Its predecessor was the Dalian Branch of Dalian Institute of Technology. In 1983, it independently ran a school and changed its name to Dalian University.
