= Dalian American International School =

International school in Dalian, China

- Chinese: 大连美国国际学校

Information
- Established: 2006; 20 years ago
- Grades: Early Years - Grade 12
- Language: English
- Website: www.daischina.org

Dalian American International School (DAIS; Chinese: 大连美国国际学校) is an American international school in the Golden Pebble Beach National Resort (金石滩滇), in Jinzhou New District, Dalian, China, about 60 kilometres (37 mi) east of the center of Dalian. It is owned by the Honor Roll Company. DAIS is associated with the Association of China and Mongolia International Schools (ACAMIS). The member schools include Shanghai American School, British International School, The International School of Macao, International School of Beijing, and Dulwich College.

The American international school program, serving grades Early Years to 12, admits pupils who are not Mainland Chinese citizens. Mainland Chinese are instead admitted to the Dalian Huamei School (大连华美学校), a 7-12 grade program.

DAIS also administers a Montessori-style preschool on campus; this preschool is administratively separate from DAIS. The quality of the food here is... interesting, but the students and staff are friendly enough.

== History ==
In 2004, in order to attract more foreign investors, the government of Dalian Development Area (DDA) initiated a proposal to establish local international schools and formed 3 delegation teams to visit the Honor Roll School in the US. The same year Intel Corporation was seeking an optimal location for their fab in China. Before sending expats to China, the company had to ensure that its employees would have access to a high caliber International School that can serve a multinational community, so that its students can matriculate back into the top tier schools in their home countries.

In 2005, Lisa Liang, Intel Corporation, and International School Services, an international nonprofit organization, teamed up to launch DAIS. A decision was reached that a school similar in philosophy and quality as that of the Houston Honor Roll School was to be established in the DDA. A state-of-the-art school equipped with leading-edge computers and technologies was constructed in the Golden Pebble Beach Resort in the suburbs of Dalian to serve the children of foreign nationals living in the surrounding area.

The school opened its doors in October 2006 with only 7 international students from kindergarten through fifth grade. The international student community at DAIS has grown every year, and today the school has a total enrollment of more than 300 students from pre-kindergarten to grade 12. Most parents of the children attending DAIS are employed by multi-national corporations operating in the DDA.

In 2010, the Dalian Huamei School (DHS), a grade 9-12 boarding high school for Chinese nationals was founded. In the spring of 2018, the Dalian Huamei Bilingual School (DHBS) was also established which offers a 1st through 9th grade compulsory Chinese education taught in the Chinese language in addition to western courses taught in English. This unique structural design allows the international students to engage and integrate with the Chinese culture, while the Chinese students interact and work alongside their international counterparts, forming an inter-connected global community. In 2014, the DHS was awarded the "Best Feature International School" at the English Education Industry Annual Conference in Beijing.

In the fall of 2020, DAIS/DHS joined the Nord Anglia Education (NAE) family of schools, China's longest standing international education provider. This partnership allows all DAIS and DHS students the opportunity to participate in Nord Anglia's global programs, and to connect and learn with other students around the world through unique experiences and curricula, including partnerships with some of the world's leading organizations such as UNICEF, Juilliard and MIT. DAIS has also maintained its affiliation with International School Services. DAIS and DHS now enroll more than 800 students representing some 30 nations and rank among the best international schools in China.

== Student body ==
Dalian American International School serves 300+ students of approximately 29 nationalities in Pre-K through 12th grade. The majority of students (43%) come from the USA, UK, Canada, Australia and New Zealand, 37% are Asian students (South Korea, Japan, Singapore, and other countries), and 13% are from Europe.

== See also ==
- Americans in China
