= Ōtani Kōzui =

Japanese Buddhist leader (1876–1948)

Count Ōtani Kōzui
- 大谷 光瑞
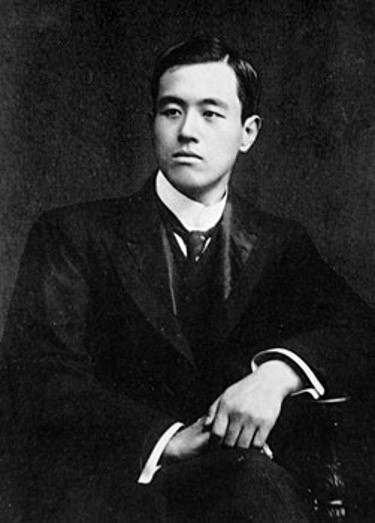
- Ōtani in 1903
- Born: 27 October 1876; Kyoto, Japan
- Died: 5 October 1948 (aged 72)
- Other name: Kyōnyo
- Occupations: Buddhist, explorer

Count Ōtani Kōzui (大谷 光瑞; 27 December 1876 – 5 October 1948) was a Japanese Buddhist leader and explorer who was the 22nd Abbot of Nishi Hongan-ji and the head of the Honganji-ha sect of Buddhism. He is known for expeditions to Buddhist archaeological sites in Central Asia, such as Subashi Temple near Kucha. His Dharma name was Kyōnyo (鏡如).

== Career ==
Between 1902 and 1910, he financed three expeditions to Central Asia, although his participation was stopped for his succession. Ōtani was a fellow of the Royal Geographical Society and hosted several fellow explorers, including Sven Hedin and Albert von Le Coq. His collection, often called "Ōtani collection" is still considered crucial in Central Asian studies, although it is today scattered across Tokyo, Kyoto, China and Korea. In addition to his spiritual responsibilities and his Central Asian activities, Ōtani wrote about China, Manchuria and Chinese porcelain. During the Great Game, British and Russian intelligence both suspected that his archaeological expeditions were little more than covers for espionage. Japan says they were solely investigations of the route along which Buddhism came to Japan and had no political connections.

After his father Ōtani Kōson's death, he succeeded as Abbot of Nishi Hongan-ji in 1903. He also devoted himself to modernizing Jōdo Shinshū, but his sponsorship incurred substantial debt for his sect. A financial scandal forced him to abdicate in 1914. His nephew, Ōtani Kosho, became the 23rd Abbot.

== See also ==
- 1902 Ōtani expedition
