= List of Dalian Metro stations =

System map

The Dalian Metro is a rapid transit system serving Dalian City, Liaoning Province, China.

== Stations ==
Station	Chinese name	Photo	Line(s)	District
Jichang	机场		Line 2 (M2)	Ganjingzi
Hongganglu	虹港路		Line 2 (M2)	Ganjingzi
Hongjinlu	虹锦路		Line 2 (M2)	Ganjingzi
Hongqixilu	红旗西路		Line 2 (M2)	Ganjingzi
Wanjia	湾家		Line 2 (M2)	Ganjingzi
Malanguangchang	马栏广场		Line 2 (M2)	Shahekou
Liaoshi	辽师		Line 2 (M2)	Shahekou
Jiaotongdaxue	交通大学		Line 2 (M2)	Shahekou
Xi'anlu	西安路		Line 2 (M2)	Shahekou
Lianhelu	联合路		Line 2 (M2)	Shahekou
Renminguangchang	人民广场		Line 2 (M2)	Xigang
Yi'erjiujie	一二九街		Line 2 (M2)	Xigang
Qingniwaqiao	青泥洼桥		Line 2 (M2)	Zhongshan
Youhaoguangchang	友好广场		Line 2 (M2)	Zhongshan
Zhongshanguangchang	中山广场		Line 2 (M2)	Zhongshan
Gangwanguangchang	港湾广场		Line 2 (M2)	Zhongshan
Huiyizhongxin	会议中心		Line 2 (M2)	Zhongshan
Hekou	河口		Line 12	Shahekou
Caidaling	蔡大岭		Line 12	Ganjingzi
Huangnichuan	黄泥川		Line 12	Lüshunkou
Longwangtang	龙王塘		Line 12	Lüshunkou
Tahewan	塔河湾		Line 12	Lüshunkou
Lüshun	旅顺		Line 12	Lüshunkou
Tieshanzhen	铁山镇		Line 12	Lüshunkou
Lüshunxingang	旅顺新港		Line 12	Lüshunkou
Baoshuiqu	保税区		Line 3 (R3)	Jinzhou
Dalian Railway Station	大连站		Line 3 (R3)	Xigang
Dalianwan	大连湾		Line 3 (R3)	Ganjingzi
DD Port	双D港		Line 3 (R3)	Jinzhou
Dongshanlu	东山路		Line 3 (R3)	Jinzhou
Hepinglu Road	和平路		Line 3 (R3)	Jinzhou
Houyan	后盐		Line 3 (R3)	Ganjingzi
Jinjiajie	金家街		Line 3 (R3)	Ganjingzi
Jinmalu	金马路		Line 3 (R3)	Jinzhou
Jinshitan	金石滩		Line 3 (R3)	Jinzhou
Jiuli	九里		Line 3 (R3)	Jinzhou
Kaifaqu	开发区		Line 3 (R3)	Jinzhou
Phoenix Peak	鸿玮澜山		Line 3 (R3)	Jinzhou
Quanshui	泉水		Line 3 (R3)	Ganjingzi
Shijiuju	十九局		Line 3 (R3)	Jinzhou
Tostem	通世泰		Line 3 (R3)	Jinzhou
Xianglujiao	香炉礁		Line 3 (R3)	Xigang
Xiaoyaowan	小窑湾		Line 3 (R3)	Jinzhou
