= Quanshui =

Quanshui may refer to the following locations in China:

- Quanshui Station, on Line 3 of the Dalian Metro
- Quanshui Subdistrict, Ganjingzi District, Dalian
- Quanshui, Guangxi, town in Pubei County
- Quanshui, Hunan, town in Rucheng County
- Quanshui, Sichuan, town in Qianwei County
- Quanshui Township (铨水乡) in Gansu
