= List of metro systems =

Countries with at least one metro system:
Operational
Under construction

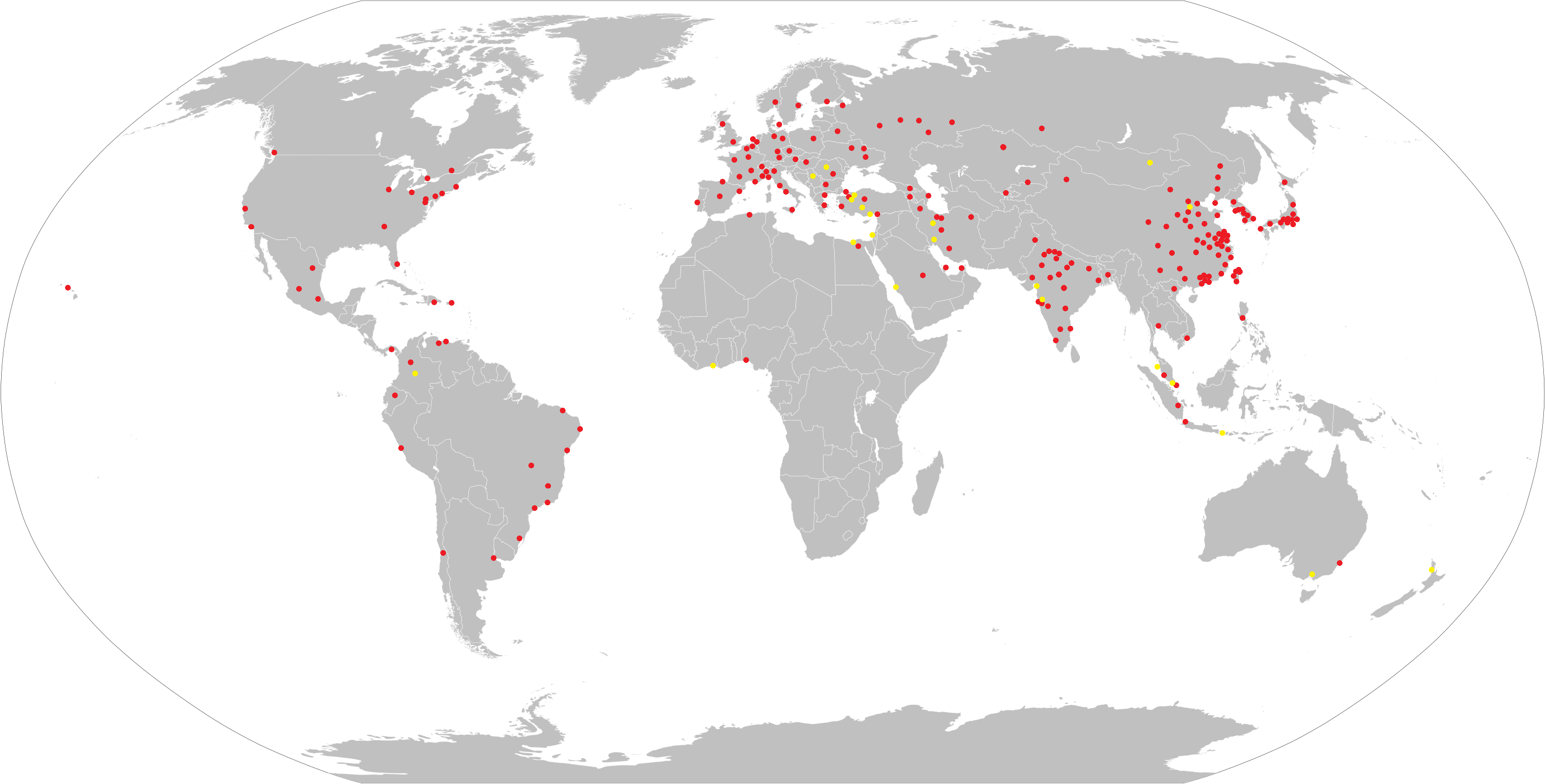
Metro systems of the world as of 2026
Operational
Under construction

This list of metro systems includes electrified rapid transit train systems worldwide. In some parts of the world, metro systems are referred to as subways, undergrounds, tubes, mass rapid transit (MRT), métro or U-Bahn. As of 16 November 2026, 215 cities in 63 countries operate 969 metro lines under 234 systems.

The London Underground first opened as an underground railway in 1863 and its first electrified underground line, the City and South London Railway, opened in 1890, making it the world's oldest metro system. As of 2024, the country with the most metro systems is China, with 54 in operation, including 11 of the 12 longest networks in the world and the four highest in annual ridership numbers.

== Considerations ==
The International Association of Public Transport (L'Union Internationale des Transports Publics, or UITP) defines metro systems as urban passenger transport systems, "operated on their own right of way and segregated from general road and pedestrian traffic". The terms heavy rail (mainly in North America) and heavy urban rail are essentially synonymous with the term "metro". Heavy rail systems are also specifically defined as an "electric railway".

The dividing line between the metro and other modes of public transport, such as light rail and commuter rail, is not always clear. The UITP only makes distinctions between "metros" and "light rail", whereas the American Public Transportation Association (APTA) and Federal Transit Administration (FTA) distinguish all three modes. A common way to distinguish metro from light rail is by their separation from other traffic. While light rail systems may share roads with car traffic or use sections of track with level crossings across roads, metro systems tend to run on a grade-separated exclusive right-of-way with no access for other traffic.

In contrast to commuter rail or light rail, metro systems are primarily used for transport within a city, and have higher service frequencies and substantially higher passenger volume capacities. Most metro systems do not share tracks with freight trains or inter-city rail services. It is not relevant whether the system runs on steel wheels or rubber tyres, or if the power supply is from a third rail or overhead line.

The name of the system is not a criterion for inclusion or exclusion. Some cities use "metro" as a brand name for a transit line with no component of rapid transit whatsoever. Similarly, there are systems branded "light rail" that meet every criterion for being a rapid transit system. Some systems also incorporate light metro or light rail lines as part of the larger system under a common name. These are listed, but the light rail lines are not counted in the provided network data.

Certain transit networks may match the service standards of metro systems, but reach far out of the city and are sometimes known as S-Bahn, suburban, regional or commuter rail. These are not included in this list. Neither are funicular systems, or people movers, such as amusement park, ski resort and airport transport systems.

This list counts metros separately when multiple metros in one city or metropolitan area have separate owners or operating companies. This list expressly does not aim at representing the size and scope of the total rapid transit network of a certain city or metropolitan area. The data in this list should not be used to infer the size of a city's, region's, or country's urban rail transit systems, or to establish a ranking.

== Legend ==
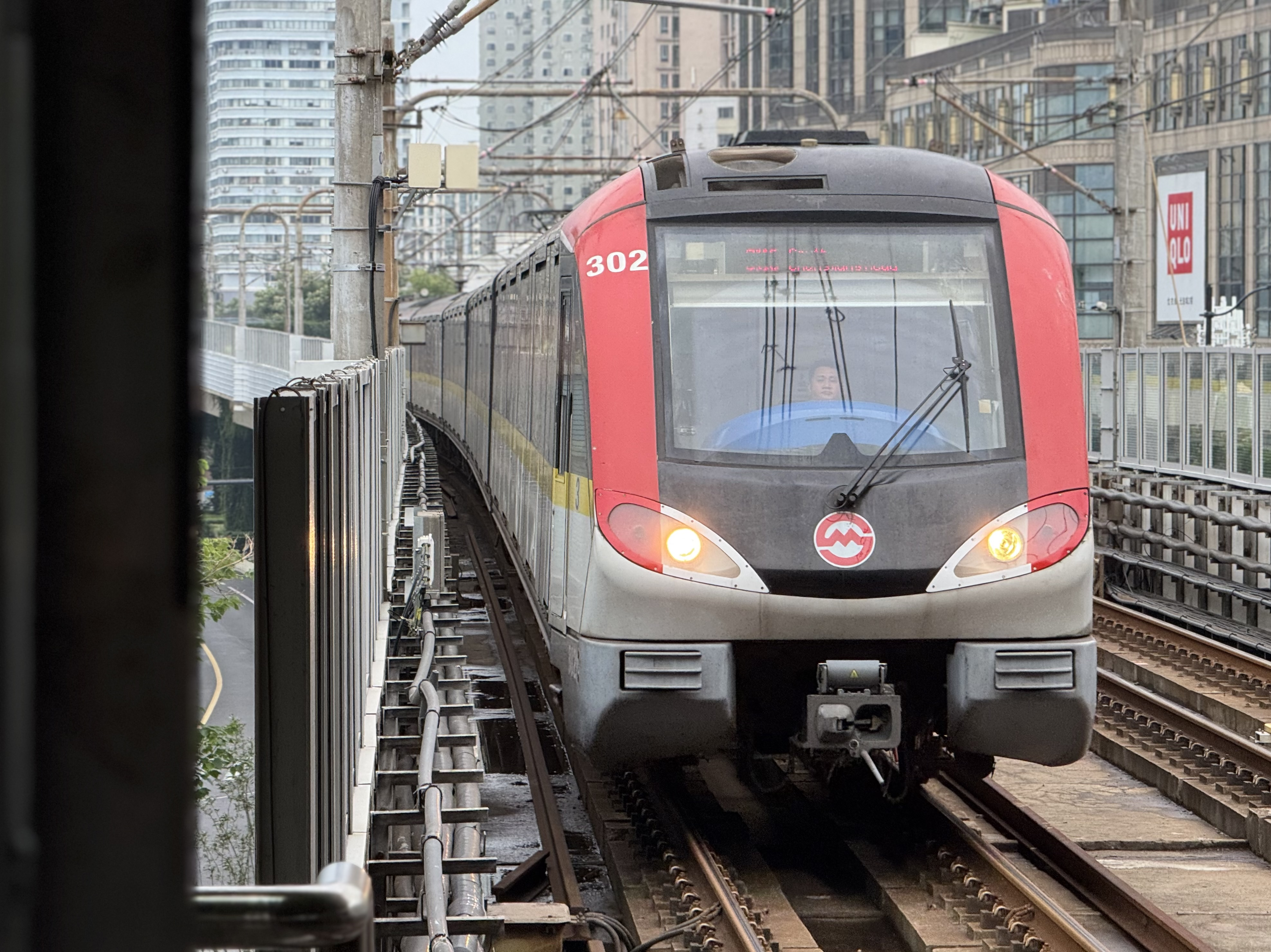
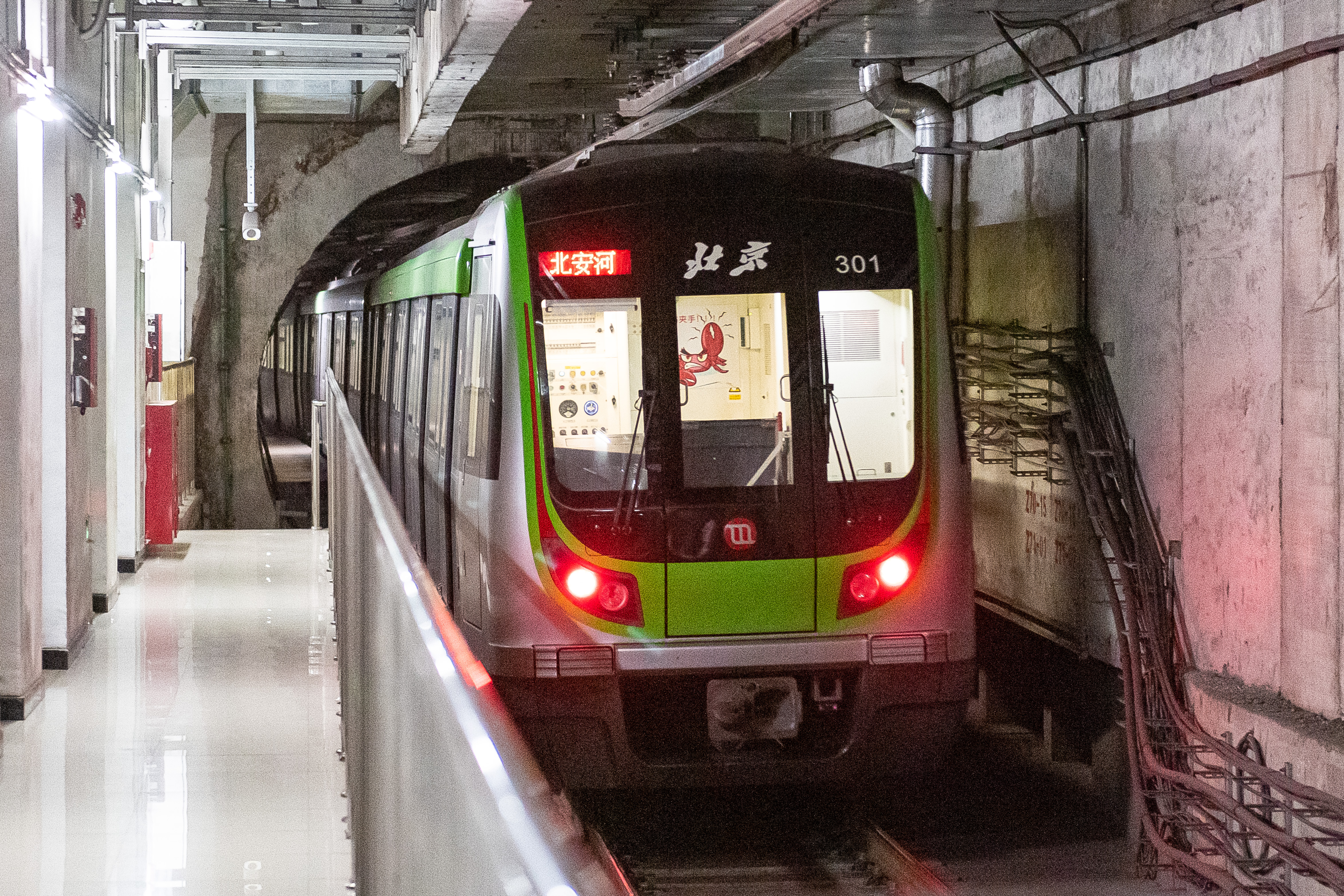
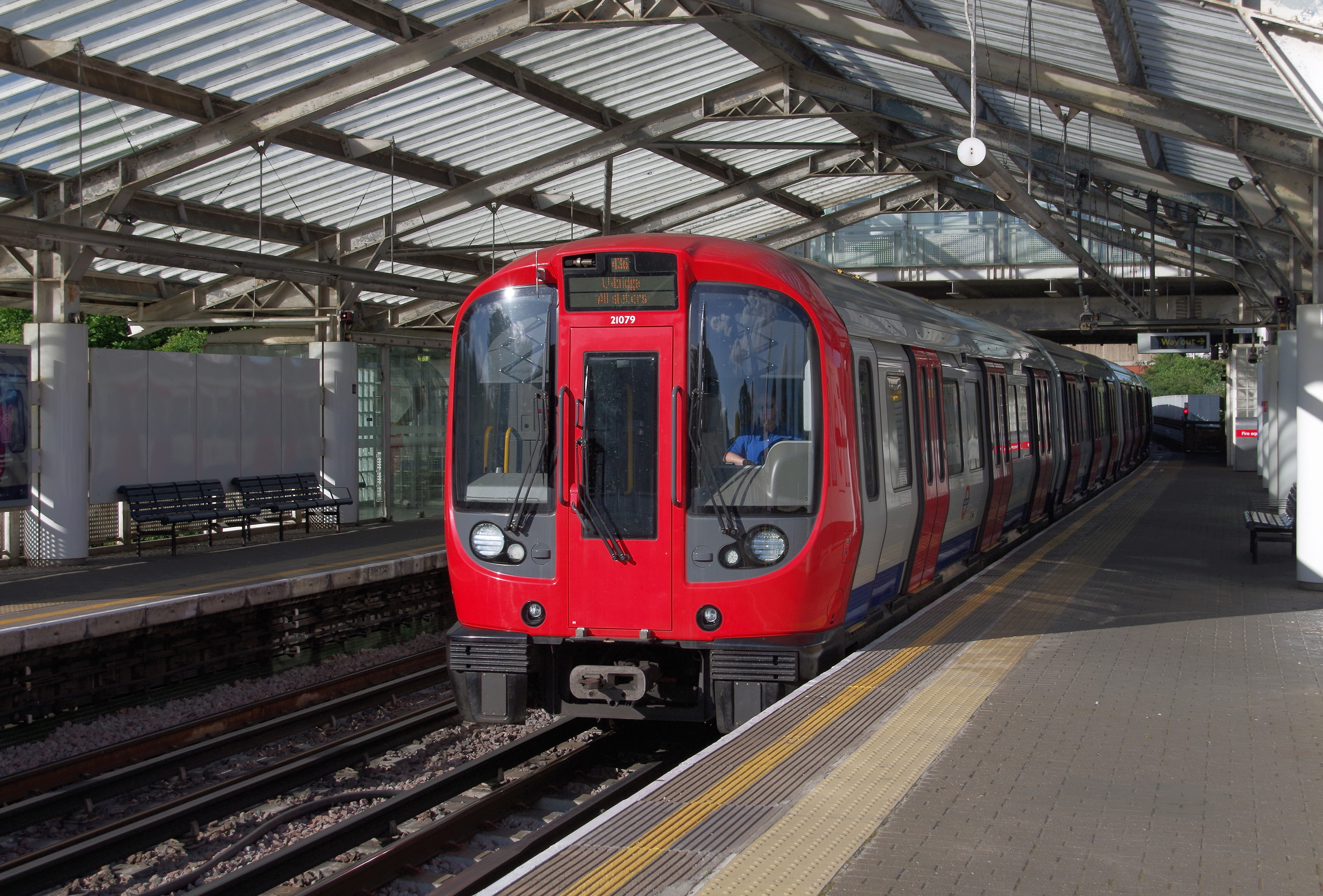
Metro systems from top to bottom that have set records: The Shanghai Metro has the highest annual ridership in the world. The Beijing Subway is the largest system in the world by total track length. The London Underground is the world's oldest metro system.

City
Primary city served by the metro system.
Country
Sovereign state in which the metro system is located.
Name
The most common English name of the metro system (including a link to the article for that system).
Year opened

The year the metro system was opened for commercial service at metro standards. In other words, parts of the system may be older, but as parts of a former light rail or commuter rail network, so the year that the system obtained metro standards (most notably electrification) is the one listed.

Year of last expansion
The last time the system length or number of stations in the metro system was expanded.
Stations
The number of stations in the metro network, with stations connected by transfer counted as one.
System length
The system length of a metro network is the sum of the lengths of all routes in the rail network in kilometers or miles. Each route is counted only once, regardless of how many lines pass over it, and regardless of whether it is single-track or multi-track, single carriageway or dual carriageway.
Ridership
The number of unique journeys on the metro system every year. There is a major discrepancy between the ridership figures: some metro systems count transferring between lines as multiple journeys, but others do not. Numbers may also be counted via different methods – faregates/turnstiles or light barriers at entrances or vehicle doors being the most common but far from the only ones.

== List ==
Table notes

Name	City	Country	Service opened	Last expanded	Stations	System length	Annual ridership (millions)
Algiers Metro	Algiers	Algeria	2011	2018	19	18.5 km (11.5 mi)	46 (2023)
Buenos Aires Underground	Buenos Aires	Argentina	1913 (Note: Line A opened in stages between 1913 and 1914 by the Anglo-Argentine Tramways Company. Line A services continued as above-ground tram services through an access ramp at Primera Junta Station. Subway-surface services into Line A ceased in 1926, with the line and its rolling stock transitioned into pure rapid transit operation by 1927.)	2019	78 (Note: The number is 78 if interchange stations (i.e. different sets of platforms) are counted as one station, or 90 if all stations on all lines are counted multiple times for each line.)	56.7 km (35.2 mi)	192.2 (2025)
Yerevan Metro	Yerevan	Armenia	1981	1996	10	12.1 km (7.5 mi)	26.4 (2024)
Sydney Metro	Sydney	Australia	2019	2026	31	66 km (41 mi)	71.7 (2025) (Note: This patronage figure is derived from OPAL trips (i.e. a tap-on/tap-off pair of the same OPAL card, including isolated tap-on or tap-off), non-OPAL ridership, as the users of some concessional cards or integrated tickets for events, is excluded.)
Vienna U-Bahn	Vienna	Austria	1978 (Note: Vienna's Metropolitan Railway (Wiener Stadtbahn) first opened for service in 1898, operating steam locomotive trains on mostly elevated or underground ROWs. From 1976 onwards, part of it was integrated into the newly established Vienna U-Bahn system (lines U4 and U6), operating as a modern metro.)	2026	99	83.3 km (51.8 mi)	404.8 (2024)
Baku Metro	Baku	Azerbaijan	1967	2022	25 (Note: The number of stations is 25 if interchange stations (i.e. different sets of platforms in a single complex) are counted as one station, or 27 if all stations on all lines are counted each.)	40.7 km (25.3 mi)	223.3 (2024)
Dhaka Metro Rail	Dhaka	Bangladesh	2022	2023	16	20.1 km (12.5 mi)	100.38 (2024) (Note: Figure extrapolated from 2,75,000 average daily ridership figures over an year as mentioned in the cited report)
Minsk Metro	Minsk	Belarus	1984	2024	33 (Note: The number of stations is 33 if interchange stations (i.e. different sets of platforms in a single complex) are counted as one station, or 36 if all stations on all lines are counted each.)	44.9 km (27.9 mi)	250.3 (2024)
Brussels Metro	Brussels	Belgium	1976	2009 (Note: Line 2's loop was completed in 2009.)	59 (Note: Not including stations of premetro Lines T4, T7, and T10.)	39.9 km (24.8 mi)	138.3 (2024)
Belo Horizonte Metro	Belo Horizonte	Brazil	1986	2026	20	29.8 km (18.5 mi)	54.4 (2019)
Federal District Metro	Brasília	Brazil	2001	2020	27	42.4 km (26.3 mi)	39.1 (2022)
Fortaleza Metro (Note: Includes Metrofor's rapid transit line only: Linha Sul (South Line).)	Fortaleza	Brazil	2012	2013	20	24.1 km (15.0 mi)	8.9 (2022)
Porto Alegre Metro	Porto Alegre	Brazil	1985	2014	22	43.8 km (27.2 mi)	31.9 (2022)
Recife Metro (Note: Includes Metrorec's rapid transit lines only: Linha Centro (Center Line) and Linha Sul (South Line).)	Recife	Brazil	1985	2009	28	39.5 km (24.5 mi)	93.5 (2019) (Note: This ridership figure is the sum of those quoted for the two metro lines: as for the Linha Centro, see "Demanda anual de usuários da Linha Centro STU-REC" (PDF) (in Portuguese). Companhia Brasileira de Trens Urbanos (CBTU). Archived from the original (PDF) on 27 July 2020.; as for the Linha Sul, see "Demanda anual de usuários da Linha Sul STU-REC" (PDF) (in Portuguese). Companhia Brasileira de Trens Urbanos (CBTU). Archived from the original (PDF) on 27 July 2020.; via GOAPO (Gerência Operacional de Apoio) – Demanda de usuários transportados)
Rio de Janeiro Metro	Rio de Janeiro	Brazil	1979	2016	41	58 km (36 mi)	188.9 (2023)
Salvador Metro	Salvador	Brazil	2014	2023	22	38 km (24 mi)	117.5 (2024)
São Paulo Metro (Note: Does not include São Paulo Metropolitan Trains system.)	São Paulo	Brazil	1974	2026	103	116.85 km (72.61 mi)	1,265 (2025) (Note: This ridership figure includes the ViaQuatro Line 4 and Via Mobilidade Line 5 ridership in the total.)
Sofia Metro	Sofia	Bulgaria	1998	2026	50	55 km (34 mi)	127.2 (2024)
Montreal Metro	Montreal	Canada	1966	2007	68	69.2 km (43.0 mi)	330.8 (2024) (Note: All American Public Transportation Association figures are derived from unlinked transit passenger trips (i.e. a transfer between two lines counts as two passenger trips, transferring twice counts as three trips, etc.).)
Réseau express métropolitain	Montreal	Canada	2023	2026	23	64 km (40 mi)	25 (2026)
Toronto subway (Note: These statistics do not include Line 5 Eglinton and Line 6 Finch West as they are light rail lines.)	Toronto	Canada	1954	2017	70	70.5 km (43.8 mi)	331.8 (2024)
SkyTrain	Vancouver	Canada	1985	2024 (Note: Indicates the opening of Capstan station, an infill station of the Canada Line, which opened on 20 December 2024.)	54	79.6 km (49.5 mi)	149.1 (2024)
Santiago Metro	Santiago	Chile	1975	2023	126 (Note: The number is 126 if interchange stations (i.e. different sets of platforms) are counted as one station, or 143 if all stations on all lines are counted multiple times for each line.)	149 km (93 mi)	640.0 (2024)
Beijing Subway	Beijing	China	1971 (Note: The Beijing Subway's first line began trial operations on 1 October 1969. It opened to revenue service under trial operations on 15 January 1971. Initially, only members of the public with credential letters from their work units could purchase tickets, but this restriction was removed on 27 December 1972. The subway line passed its final inspections and ended trial operations on 15 September 1981. During the trial operations period, annual ridership rose from 8.28 million in 1971 to 55.2 million in 1980. See the history section of the Beijing Subway for details and references.)	2026	410 (Note: The number of stations is 405 if the 104 (94 2-line, 10 3-line) interchange stations (i.e. different sets of platforms) are counted as one station, or 519 if all stations on all lines are counted multiple times for each line. Bajiao Amusement Park on Line 1 (closed for the construction of Line 1 Branch, from June 2025 to May 2027) is not counted during renovation, so the active stations are 404. Out-of-station interchange stations with same name (e.g. Dazhong Si; Muxidi), are counted as one station. Capital Airport Express and Daxing Airport Express lines and stations are counted, despite being an express service with separate fares. Both counts exclude the 20 stations of the Xijiao and Line T1 tram lines.)	909 km (565 mi)	3,573.6 (2025) (Note: Ridership data includes that of Xijiao and Line T1 tram lines.)
Changchun Rail Transit	Changchun	China	2017 (Note: Opening of metro Line 1 and not light rail Line 3, which opened in 2002.)	2026	108 (Note: Stations served by Line 3 not counted as Line 3 is a light rail line with at grade crossings.)	159.8 km (99.3 mi) (Note: Line 3 not included due to being a light rail line with road crossings.)	281.3 (2025), may include light rail traffic
Changsha Metro	Changsha	China	2014	2026	148	228.49 km (141.98 mi)	1,012.4 (2025)
Changzhou Metro	Changzhou	China	2019	2021	43	54 km (33.55 mi)	74.1 (2025)
Chengdu Metro	Chengdu	China	2010	2025	363 (Note: There are 363 stations if the 85 (78 2-line, 7 3-line) interchange stations (i.e. different sets of platforms) are counted as one station. There are 448 stations if all stations on all lines are counted multiple times for each line. Excludes light rail line T2.)	716.37 km (445.13 mi)	2,244.5 (2025)
Chongqing Rail Transit	Chongqing	China	2004	2026	297 (Note: There are 297 stations if the 49 (43 2-line, 6 3-line) interchange stations (i.e. different sets of platforms) are counted as one station. There are 352 stations if all stations on all lines are counted multiple times for each line.)	624 km (388 mi)	1,498.7 (2025)
Dalian Metro	Dalian	China	2003	2023	100	237.7 km (147.7 mi)	261.3 (2025)
Dongguan Rail Transit	Dongguan	China	2016	2025	39	95.26 km (59.19 mi)	55.3 (2025)
Foshan Metro (Note: First line of Foshan Metro, the Guangfo Line, serves two cities – Foshan and Guangzhou. The Guangfo Line is operated by Guangzhou Metro and as such is included in Guangzhou's tally.)	Foshan	China	2010	2026	49	98.5 km (61.2 mi)	191.1 (2025)
Fuzhou Metro	Fuzhou	China	2016	2025	102 (Note: There are 102 stations if the (14 2-line, 1 3-line) interchange stations (i.e. different sets of platforms) are counted as one station. There are 118 stations if all stations on all lines are counted multiple times for each line.)	205.8 km (127.9 mi)	315.0 (2025)
Guangzhou Metro (Note: The 9-station, 4.0-km-long APM line is not included here, because it is a people mover.)	Guangzhou	China	1997	2025	317 (Note: There are 317 stations if the 76 (58 2-line, 8 3-line, 1 4-line) interchange stations (i.e. different sets of platforms) are counted as one station. There are 397 stations if all stations on all lines are counted multiple times for each line.)	779.9 km (484.6 mi)	3,321.1 (2025)
Guiyang Metro	Guiyang	China	2017	2024	82	149.05 km (92.62 mi)	286.7 (2025)
Hangzhou Metro	Hangzhou	China	2012	2025	254 (Note: There are 254 stations if the 44 (40 2-line, 4 3-line) interchange stations (i.e. different sets of platforms) are counted as one station. There are 302 stations if all stations on all lines are counted multiple times for each line.)	516.2 km (320.8 mi)	1,501.5 (2025)
Harbin Metro	Harbin	China	2013	2024	78	91.57 km (56.90 mi)	416.3 (2025)
Hefei Metro	Hefei	China	2016	2026	204	306.8 km (190.6 mi)	569.3 (2025)
Hohhot Metro	Hohhot	China	2019	2020	43	49 km (30 mi)	81.7 (2025)
Mass Transit Railway	Hong Kong	China	1979 (Note: The first MTR route to offer metro service was the Modified Initial System in 1979, which consists of portions of the later Tsuen Wan Line and Kwun Tong Line. Though the eventual East Rail Line opened as a conventional railway in 1910, it did not offer metro service until at least in 1982 when it was electrified.)	2022	99	209.1 km (129.9 mi)	1,714.4 (2025) (Note: Note that: 1. the ridership includes "Domestic Service", "Airport Express" and "Cross-boundary"; 2. "Intercity, Light Rail & Bus" and "High Speed Rail (HSR)" are excluded from the counts.)
Jinan Metro	Jinan	China	2019	2025	103	182.4 km (113.3 mi)	133.8 (2025)
Jinhua Rail Transit	Jinhua	China	2022	2026	30	107.17 km (66.59 mi)	48.3 (2024)
Kunming Metro	Kunming	China	2012	2022	103	165.85 km (103.05 mi)	298.6 (2025)
Lanzhou Metro	Lanzhou	China	2019	2023	27	35 km (22 mi)	143.7 (2025)
Luoyang Subway	Luoyang	China	2021	2021	33	43.6 km (27.1 mi)	67.4 (2025)
Macau Light Rapid Transit	Macau	China	2019	2024	15	16.3 km (10.1 mi)	9.62 (2025).
Nanchang Metro	Nanchang	China	2015	2025	113	160.2 km (99.5 mi)	431.7 (2025)
Nanjing Metro	Nanjing	China	2005	2026	272	658.1 km (408.9 mi)	1,130.0 (2025)
Nanning Metro	Nanning	China	2016	2025	95	132 km (82 mi)	375.6 (2025)
Nantong Rail Transit	Nantong	China	2022	2023	43	60 km (37 mi)	48.8 (2025)
Ningbo Rail Transit	Ningbo	China	2014	2026	164	359.05 km (223.10 mi)	402.7 (2025)
Qingdao Metro	Qingdao	China	2015	2026	176	359.36 km (223.30 mi)	535.8 (2025)
Shanghai Metro	Shanghai	China	1993	2025	415 (Note: As of November 2025, the number of stations is 515 if the 83 interchange stations (i.e. different sets of platforms) (70 2-line, 11 3-line, and 2 4-line) are counted multiple times, once for each line, while there are 415 stations if they are combined; shared tracks/platforms on Lines 3 and 4 are anyway counted as a single stations (nine in all between Hongqiao Road and Baoshan Road). Out-of-station interchange stations with same name (e.g. South Pudong Road), are counted as one station.)	889.96 km (553.00 mi) (Note: This figure excludes Maglev line and Jinshan Railway, all of which often included in Shanghai Metro maps but not considered part of the system.)	3,700.2 (2025) (Note: Ridership excludes Pujiang line, Maglev line and Jinshan Railway.)
Shaoxing Metro	Shaoxing	China	2021	2025	40	65.2 km (40.5 mi)	45.1 (2025)
Shenyang Metro	Shenyang	China	2010	2026	143	216.7 km (134.7 mi)	700.1 (2025)
Shenzhen Metro	Shenzhen	China	2004	2026	339 (Note: As of 28 June 2026, there are 444 stations if the 82 interchange stations (i.e. different sets of platforms) are counted multiple times, while there are 339 stations if they are counted as one station.)	642.02 km (398.93 mi)	3,285.1 (2025)
Shijiazhuang Metro	Shijiazhuang	China	2017	2021	60	76.5 km (47.5 mi)	189.3 (2025)
Suzhou Metro	Suzhou	China	2012	2024	285	346.76 km (215.47 mi)	660.0 (2025)
Taiyuan Metro	Taiyuan	China	2020	2025	47	52.384 km (32.550 mi)	101.3 (2025)
Taizhou Rail Transit	Taizhou	China	2022	–	15	52.4 km (32.6 mi)	12.2 (2024) (Note: Figure extrapolated from 3,042,300 quarterly ridership.)
Tianjin Metro	Tianjin	China	1984	2026	237	378.8 km (235.4 mi)	668.6 (2025)
Ürümqi Metro	Ürümqi	China	2018	2026	31	45.46 km (28.25 mi)	44.4 (2025)
Wenzhou Rail Transit	Wenzhou	China	2019	2023	36	116.5 km (72.4 mi)	21.1 (2025)
Wuhan Metro	Wuhan	China	2004	2026	297 (Note: There are 289 stations if the 42 (38 2-line, 4 3-line) interchange stations (i.e. different sets of platforms) are counted as one station. There are 335 stations if all stations on all lines are counted multiple times for each line.)	581.02 km (361.03 mi)	1,443.8 (2025)
Wuhu Rail Transit	Wuhu	China	2021	2021	36	46.2 km (28.7 mi)	37.5 (2025)
Wuxi Metro	Wuxi	China	2014	2024	89	145.2 km (90.2 mi)	228.0 (2025)
Xiamen Metro	Xiamen	China	2017	2023	70	98.4 km (61.1 mi)	275.9 (2025)
Xi'an Metro	Xi'an	China	2011	2026	244 (Note: The number is 244 if interchange stations (i.e. different sets of platforms) are counted as one station, or 285 if all stations on all lines are counted multiple times for each line.)	423.91 km (263.41 mi) (Note: Excludes Xi'an-Huyi Railway and Xi'an SkyShuttle)	1,524.1 (2025)
Xuzhou Metro	Xuzhou	China	2019	2025	67	95.452 km (59.311 mi)	119.1 (2025)
Zhengzhou Metro	Zhengzhou	China	2013	2024	233 (Note: There are 233 stations if interchange stations (i.e. different sets of platforms) are counted as one station. There are 284 stations if all stations on all lines are counted multiple times for each line.)	449.81 km (279.50 mi)	823.3 (2025)
Medellín Metro	Medellín	Colombia	1995	2012 (Note: Extension of Line A from Itagüí south to La Estrella.)	27	31.3 km (19.4 mi)	202.5 (2025)
Prague Metro	Prague	Czech Republic	1974	2015 (Note: Line A was extended in April 2015.)	61	65.4 km (40.6 mi)	378.8 (2024)
Copenhagen Metro	Copenhagen	Denmark	2002	2024	44	43.3 km (26.9 mi)	125.6 (2024)
Santo Domingo Metro	Santo Domingo	Dominican Republic	2009	2026	38	38.6 km (24.0 mi)	103.4 (2025) (Note: "Informe Trimestral de Evolución de la Demanda – Octubre - Diciembre 2025" [Quarterly Report on the Evolution of Demand – October - December 2025] (pdf) (in Spanish). Oficina para el Reordenamiento de Transporte (OPRET). 12 January 2026. pp. 7–8. This ridership figure is the sum of those quoted for the rapid transit lines)
Quito Metro	Quito	Ecuador	2023	–	15	22.6 km (14.0 mi)	54.4 (2024) (Note: "Metro en cifras" (pdf) (in Spanish). Alcaldía Metropolitana de Quito. 22 December 2025. p. 10. This ridership figure is derived from the sum of the twelve monthly subtotals for 2024)
Cairo Metro	Cairo	Egypt	1987	2024	84 (Note: Counting interchange stations only once.)	106.8 km (66.4 mi)	1,460.0 (2023)
Helsinki Metro	Helsinki	Finland	1982	2022	30	43 km (27 mi)	79.0 (2023)
Lille Metro	Lille	France	1983	2000	60	45 km (28 mi)	126.1 (2024)
Lyon Metro	Lyon	France	1978	2023	42	34.4 km (21.4 mi)	230.1 (2024)
Marseille Metro	Marseille	France	1977	2019	29	22.7 km (14.1 mi)	76.8 (2024)
Paris Metro	Paris	France	1900	2025	321 (Note: The number is 321 if stations are counted individually. If transfers are counted by just adding up the number of stops in each line, the number is 405.)	245.6 km (152.6 mi)	1,523 (2025) (Note: Does not include ridership on the RER/Transilien (1,436 million in 2025) and the Tramways (389 million).)
Rennes Metro	Rennes	France	2002	2022	28	22.4 km (13.9 mi)	53.7 (2024)
Toulouse Metro	Toulouse	France	1993	2007	37	28.2 km (17.5 mi)	118.3 (2024)
Tbilisi Metro	Tbilisi	Georgia	1966	2017 (Note: Opening of State University Station on Saburtalo Line.)	23	27.3 km (17.0 mi)	78.4 (2024)
Berlin U-Bahn	Berlin	Germany	1902	2021	175	155.6 km (96.7 mi)	554.3 (2024)
Hamburg U-Bahn	Hamburg	Germany	1912	2019	93	106 km (66 mi)	259.4 (2024)
Munich U-Bahn	Munich	Germany	1971	2010 (Note: The U3 extension from Olympia-Einkaufszentrum (OEZ) to Moosach.)	96	95 km (59 mi)	452 (2024)
Nuremberg U-Bahn	Nuremberg	Germany	1972	2020	49	38.4 km (23.9 mi)	114.4 (2025)
Athens Metro (Note: The Blue Line (Line 3) also has a 20.7 km (12.9 mi) section (with 4 stations) to the airport that is owned by the Hellenic Railways Organisation and is mainly used by the suburban railway system.)	Athens	Greece	1904 (Note: The Green Line (Line 1), operated until 2011 by Athens–Piraeus Electric Railways, was opened in 1869 as a steam train railway line. It was electrified in 1904, extended with underground sections through the city in 1948, and extended to its full length to Kifissia in 1957 using the right-of-way of a former metre gauge suburban line. Full metro operation since 1904 between Piraeus and Athens and 1957 to Kifissia. In 2011, it was integrated with Athens Metro under the company STASY S.A.)	2022	66	91.7 km (57.0 mi)	240.0 (2024) (Note: This ridership figure is the sum of the two "Μετρό" figures (Γ1 line, or "Ηλεκτρικός", formerly ran by IASA and Γ2–Γ3 lines, formerly ran by AMEL) from the OAΣA's 2024 Activity Report.)
Thessaloniki Metro	Thessaloniki	Greece	2024	2026	18	14.38 km (8.94 mi)	27.0 (2025)
Budapest Metro	Budapest	Hungary	1896	2014	48	39.2 km (24.4 mi)	382.6 (2023)
Agra Metro	Agra	India	2024	–	6	5.2 km (3.2 mi)	1.7 (2024)
Ahmedabad Metro	Ahmedabad	India	2019	2026	53	68.23 km (42.40 mi)	48.4 (2025)
Namma Metro	Bengaluru	India	2011	2026	88	103.6 km (64.4 mi)	278.54 (2024 (Note: Fiscal year not calendar year))
Bhopal Metro	Bhopal	India	2025	–	8	6.22 km (3.86 mi)	n/a
Chennai Metro	Chennai	India	2015	2026	51	68.74 km (42.71 mi)	111.9 (2025)
Delhi Metro	Delhi	India	2002	2026	243 (Note: The network consists of 271 stations if transfer stations are counted more than once. If transfer stations are counted only once, the result will be 243 stations. Ashok Park Main station, where the two diverging branches of Green Line share tracks/platforms, is anyway counted as a single station. Stations of Noida Metro and Gurgaon Metro are not counted. If they were counted, then there would be 303 total stations.)	375.94 km (233.60 mi) (Note: The lengths of the Noida Metro and Gurgaon Metro are not counted with the Delhi Metro. If they were counted, the total length of the three systems would be 415.48 km (258.17 mi).)	2,358 (2025)
Gurugram Metro	Gurgaon	India	2013	2017	11	12.854 km (7.987 mi)	17.0 (2024)
Hyderabad Metro	Hyderabad	India	2017	2020	57	69.2 km (43.0 mi)	162.06 (2023) (Note: Figure extrapolated from 4,40,000 average daily ridership figures over an year as mentioned in the cited report)
Indore Metro	Indore	India	2025	2026	16	17 km (11 mi)	n/a
Jaipur Metro	Jaipur	India	2015	2020	11	11.979 km (7.443 mi)	19.2 (2025)
Kanpur Metro	Kanpur	India	2021	2025	14	16 km (9.9 mi)	n/a
Kochi Metro	Kochi	India	2017	2024	25	28.125 km (17.476 mi)	36.5 (2025)
Kolkata Metro	Kolkata	India	1984	2025	55	73.12 km (45.43 mi)	236 (2025)
Lucknow Metro	Lucknow	India	2017	2019	21	22.878 km (14.216 mi)	26.82 (2023) (Note: Figure extrapolated from 73,476 average daily ridership figures over an year as mentioned in the cited report)
Mumbai Metro	Mumbai	India	2014	2026	77	91.36 km (56.77 mi)	195.4 (2024) (Note: Figure extrapolated from a sum of average daily ridership figures of lines 1 (3,54,610), 2A & 7 (1,80,726.37) over an year as mentioned in the cited reports)
Meerut Metro	Meerut	India	2026	–	12	23.6 km (14.7 mi)	n/a
Nagpur Metro	Nagpur	India	2019	2022	37	38.215 km (23.746 mi)	40.15 (2025) (Note: Figure extrapolated from 110,000 average daily ridership figures over an year as mentioned in the cited report)
Navi Mumbai Metro	Navi Mumbai	India	2023	–	11	11.10 km (6.90 mi)	5.75 (2025)
Noida Metro	Noida	India	2019	–	21	29.168 km (18.124 mi)	20.0 (2024)
Patna Metro	Patna	India	2025	2026	4	6.2 km (3.9 mi)	n/a
Pune Metro	Pune	India	2022	2026	44	56.3 km (35.0 mi)	59.87 (2025)
Jakarta MRT	Jakarta	Indonesia	2019	–	13	15.7 km (9.8 mi)	45.5 (2025)
Jakarta LRT	Jakarta	Indonesia	2019	2026	11	12 km (7.5 mi)	1.3 (2025)
Jabodebek LRT	Jakarta	Indonesia	2023	–	18	44.5 km (27.7 mi)	7.25 (2023)
Palembang LRT	Palembang	Indonesia	2018	–	13	23.4 km (14.5 mi)	4.2 (2024)
Isfahan Metro	Isfahan	Iran	2015	2018	20	20.2 km (12.6 mi)	27 (2023)
Mashhad Urban Railway	Mashhad	Iran	2011	2025	40	43.3 km (26.9 mi)	50.7 (2018)
Shiraz Metro	Shiraz	Iran	2014	2024 (Note: Adelabad station opened)	24	32.5 km (20.2 mi)	18 (2018)
Karaj Metro	Karaj	Iran	2023 (Note: Opening of metro-standards Line 2.)	2025	4 (Note: The 43 km (27 mi) Line 1 of Karaj Metro (part of line 5 of Tehran metro) is a commuter rail line, and so is not included in the statistics here. If Line 1 is included, there would be 11 stations.)	10.5 km (6.5 mi)	n/a
Tabriz Metro	Tabriz	Iran	2015	2020	18	17.2 km (10.7 mi)	n/a
Tehran Metro	Tehran	Iran	2000	2025	132 (Note: (Note: There are 132 stations if interchange stations are counted once, and 147 stations if they are counted multiple times. The 67.5 km (41.9 mi) Line 5 of the Tehran Metro is a commuter rail line, and so is not included in the statistics here – only metro Lines 1–4 and 6–7 are. If Line 5 is included, the total length of the system would be 292.1 km (181.5 mi), and there would be 143 unique stations, and 160 total stations.))	224.6 km (139.6 mi)	820 (2018)
Brescia Metro	Brescia	Italy	2013	–	17	13.7 km (8.5 mi)	17.0 (2023)
Catania Metro	Catania	Italy	1999	2024	12	10.5 km (6.5 mi)	6.5 (2019)
Genoa Metro	Genoa	Italy	1990	2012	8	7.1 km (4.4 mi)	15.3 (2018) (Note: Figure extrapolated from 42 000 average daily boardings)
Milan Metro	Milan	Italy	1964	2024	125 (Note: As of July 2023, the number is 134 if the 9 interchange stations (i.e. different sets of platforms) are counted multiple times, once for each line, while it is 113 if they are combined.)	111.8 km (69.5 mi)	341 (2024)
Naples Metro (Note: Lines 1, 6, and 11 only, not line 2, which is commuter rail.)	Naples	Italy	1993	2025	31	36.4 km (22.6 mi)	41.1 (2019) (Note: 56.4 million including 4 Funicular lines)
Rome Metro	Rome	Italy	1955	2025	74	62.5 km (38.8 mi)	161.5 (2023)
Turin Metro	Turin	Italy	2006	2021	23	15.1 km (9.4 mi)	39 (2024)
Tōyō Rapid Railway Line	Chiba Prefecture	Japan	1996	–	9	16.2 km (10.1 mi)	56.1 (2024) (Note: Compared to European or North American systems, Japanese rapid transit systems are generally neither thought of as metros nor as completely subterranean "subways" complicating whether only using the municipal subway statistic is accurate when comparing with other Metros around the world. As example Tokyo Metro and the Tokyo Metropolitan Bureau of Transportation's Toei Subway constitute only 22% of the 14.6 billion metropolitan railway ridership in Greater Tokyo (MLIT Yearly Statistics). In addition, when one considers intracity lines of JR East and private railway companies, Greater Tokyo (130 lines) has higher daily ridership than any other metropolitan area in the world with 14.6 billion passengers annually. The Osaka Municipal Subway also has only a minority share of all metropolitan railway ridership in Greater Osaka, constituting only 17.6% of Greater Osaka's 4.745 billion rail passengers annually in 2010. Including the municipal subway systems in both Kobe and Kyoto, the result still only comprises 22% of all rail travel in the Greater Osaka area with 1065.8 million passengers yearly (MLIT Yearly Statistics). For Greater Nagoya, the Nagoya Municipal Subway has only a minority share of all metropolitan railway ridership in Greater Nagoya constituting only 38% of Greater Nagoya's 1.095 billion rail passengers annually in 2010 (MLIT Yearly Statistics). For a complete list of urban rail systems in Japan with ridership statistics, see List of urban rail systems in Japan.)
Fukuoka City Subway	Fukuoka	Japan	1981	2023	36	31.4 km (19.5 mi)	191.3 (2024)
Astram Line	Hiroshima	Japan	1994	2015	22	18.4 km (11.4 mi)	24.0 (2024)
Kobe Municipal Subway	Kobe	Japan	1977	2001	28	38.1 km (23.7 mi)	112.3 (2024)
Kobe New Transit	Kobe	Japan	1977	2006	18	15.1 km (9.4 mi)	36.5 (2023)
Kyoto Municipal Subway	Kyoto	Japan	1981	2008	31	31.2 km (19.4 mi)	146.8 (2024)
Nagoya Municipal Subway	Nagoya	Japan	1957	2011	87	93.3 km (58.0 mi)	461.0 (2024)
Osaka Metro	Osaka	Japan	1933	2025	109	141 km (88 mi)	935.0 (2024)
Kita-Osaka Kyuko Railway	Osaka	Japan	1970	2024	6	8.4 km (5.2 mi)	32.8 (2025)
New Shuttle	Saitama Prefecture	Japan	1983	1990	13	12.7 km (7.9 mi)	37.1 (2023)
Saitama Rapid Railway Line	Saitama Prefecture	Japan	2001	–	8	14.6 km (9.1 mi)	45.0 (2024)
Sapporo Municipal Subway	Sapporo	Japan	1971	1999	46	48 km (30 mi)	229.9 (2024)
Sendai Subway	Sendai	Japan	1987	2015	29	28.7 km (17.8 mi)	93.2 (2024)
Toei Subway	Tokyo	Japan	1960	2002	99 (Note: As of October 2018, the number is 106 if the 7 interchange stations (i.e. different sets of platforms) are counted multiple times, once for each line, while it is 99 if they are combined; Higashi-nihombashi station and Bakuro-yokoyama station, where an out-of-system transfer between Asakusa Line and Shinjuku Line is possible, are anyway counted as two stations.)	109 km (68 mi)	963.9 (2024)
Nippori-Toneri Liner	Tokyo	Japan	2008	–	13	9.7 km (6.0 mi)	32.9 (2023) (Note: "各駅乗降人員一覧" [List of passenger numbers at each station] (in Japanese). Tokyo Metropolitan Government Bureau of Transportation. Annual ridership figure is calculated from the 90024 passenger daily average quoted.)
Yurikamome	Tokyo	Japan	1995	2006	16	14.7 km (9.1 mi)	45.6 (2023)
Tokyo Metro	Tokyo	Japan	1927	2020	142	195.1 km (121.2 mi)	2,496.8 (2024)
Rinkai Line	Tokyo	Japan	1996	2002	8	12.2 km (7.6 mi)	82.3 (2024) (Note: "令和6年度決算の概要" [Summary of FY2024 financial results] (PDF). www.twr.co.jp (in Japanese). Tokyo Waterfront Area Rapid Transit .Inc. 5 June 2025. p. 1. Annual ridership figure is calculated from the 225431 passenger daily average quoted.)
Yokohama Municipal Subway	Yokohama	Japan	1972	2008	40	53.4 km (33.2 mi)	228.2 (2024)
Minatomirai Line	Yokohama	Japan	2004	–	6	4.1 km (2.5 mi)	78.7 (2024)
Kanazawa Seaside Line	Yokohama	Japan	1989	–	14	10.6 km (6.6 mi)	20.8 (2024)
Almaty Metro	Almaty	Kazakhstan	2011	2022	11	13.4 km (8.3 mi)	27.1 (2024)
Astana Light Metro	Astana	Kazakhstan	2026	–	18	22.4 km (13.9 mi)	n/a
Pyongyang Metro	Pyongyang	North Korea	1973	1987 (Note: Yŏnggwang and Puhŭng opened in 1987.)	17	22.5 km (14.0 mi)	36 (2009)
Busan Metro	Busan	South Korea	1985	2017 (Note: Line 1)	125 (Note: Includes Busan-Gimhae Light Rail Transit)	139.1 km (86.4 mi)	246.3 (2020)
Daegu Metro	Daegu	South Korea	1997	2015 (Note: Daegu Metro Line 3 opened in 2015.)	91	82.9 km (51.5 mi)	151.4 (2025) (Note: This ridership figure includes the Busan-Gimhae Light Rail Transit ridership in the total.) (Note: Figure extrapolated from 37,837,563 quarterly ridership.)
Daejeon Metro	Daejeon	South Korea	2006	2007 (Note: Second phase of line 1)	22	22.6 km (14.0 mi)	40 (2019)
Gimpo Goldline	Gimpo	South Korea	2019	–	10	23.67 km (14.71 mi)	n/a
Gwangju Metro	Gwangju	South Korea	2004	2008 (Note: Line 1 fully opened)	20	20.1 km (12.5 mi)	19 (2019)
Incheon Subway	Incheon	South Korea	1999	2025	68	80.5 km (50.0 mi)	228.1 (2024)
Seoul Metropolitan Subway (Note: The Seoul Subway Lines 1–9 and Seoul Light Rapid Transit is actually operated by several different operators – Seoul Metro and Seoul Metro Line 9 Corporation (SLM9), plus through-operation services from Korail – but because all of these lines are owned by the City Government of Seoul, here in the table they are counted together as one system.) (Note: Seoul's Metropolitan Subway system can also be viewed as a comprehensive metro network made up of multiple owned/operated metro systems. If viewed as such, the combined route length of Seoul's comprehensive metro-standards network would be 564.2 km (350.6 mi), with 656 stations of 24 lines.)	Seoul	South Korea	1974	2022	338	358.46 km (222.74 mi)	2,710.4 (2024) (Note: "Seoul Metropolitan Subway Transportation Statistics" (in Korean). City of Seoul. 14 July 2020. (You can select English from the language dropdown that reads "한국어")) (Note: This figure counts only gate-passers, so it only includes Seoul Metro and Seoul Subway Line 9 riders. Other lines that function as separate systems within the greater Seoul urban rail network are excluded.) (Note: Ridership is based on unlinked passenger trips (i.e. a transfer between two lines counts as two trips, transferring between three lines counts as three trips, etc.).)
Shinbundang Line (Neo Trans)	Seoul	South Korea	2011	2022	16	33.4 km (20.8 mi)	122.5 (2019) (Note: This ridership figure is the sum of the total annual trips (수송인원, boarding and transfer passengers) on the two sections (Phase 1 and Phase 2) of the line, from the accompanying reference.)
Rapid KL (Note: Statistics presented include rapid transit lines only: Ampang and Sri Petaling lines, Kelana Jaya line Kajang line, Putrajaya line, Shah Alam line and KL Monorail)	Kuala Lumpur	Malaysia	1996	2026	156 (Note: The number is 156 if interchange stations (i.e. different sets of platforms) are counted as one, or 180 if stations are counted multiple times for each line.)	241.6 km (150.1 mi)	330.2 (2025) (Note: "Prasarana's Ridership". Prasarana Malaysia Berhad. Archived from the original on 1 February 2024. This ridership figure is the sum of those quoted for the rapid transit lines)
SITEUR (Note: Line 1 of the SITEUR system has some level crossings (with priority) and can be therefore be considered "light rail" instead of "metro".)	Guadalajara	Mexico	1994 (Note: Line 1 was opened in 1989.)	2020	28 (Note: Line 1 is not counted as it features several rail crossings.)	46.5 km (28.9 mi)	168.6 (2024) (Note: "Instituto de Insituto Nacional de Informacion Estadistica y Geografica > Usuarios en el Sistema de Transporte Urbano de Pasajeros de Guadalajara > Enero a diciembre de 2021" (in Spanish). Instituto de Información, Estadística y Geografía de Jalisco (IIEG). 16 February 2022. The ridership figure includes system-wide ridership.)
Mexico City Metro	Mexico City	Mexico	1969	2012 (Note: Line 12 opened 2012.)	163 (Note: The number is 163 if interchange stations (i.e. different sets of platforms) are counted as one, or 195 if stations are counted multiple times for each line.)	200.9 km (124.8 mi) (Note: Note that: "Operación": route length in active revenue and non-revenue service; "Servicio": route length in active revenue service; "Vuelta": track length in active revenue service; "Total": all track length in active revenue, maintenance and non-revenue service; System length value derived from "RED Servicio" or net route length in active revenue service.)	1,172 (2024)
Metrorrey	Monterrey	Mexico	1991	2021	38	40.2 km (25.0 mi)	134.9 (2023)
Amsterdam Metro	Amsterdam	Netherlands	1977	2018	39	41.2 km (25.6 mi)	110.9 (2025)
Rotterdam Metro (Note: Some sections of the Rotterdam Metro (portions of Lines A, B, E) have some level crossings (with priority) and so could therefore be considered "light rail" instead of "metro".)	Rotterdam	Netherlands	1968	2023	71	102.3 km (63.6 mi)	100.7 (2024)
Lagos Rail Mass Transit (Note: Blue Line only. Red Line is a heavy rail commuter route.)	Lagos	Nigeria	2023	–	5	13 km (8.1 mi)	3.5 (2025)
Oslo Metro (Note: These systems have similarities to light rail systems, because of the existence of a few road level crossings, but are listed since they are almost entirely separated from roads.)	Oslo	Norway	1966 (Note: The first underground portion was opened in 1928, but that was a tram line. One surface line has origins from 1898. System opened as a full Metro in 1966.)	2016 (Note: Opening of the Løren station in 2016.)	101	85 km (53 mi)	116 (2024)
Lahore Metro	Lahore	Pakistan	2020	–	26	27.1 km (16.8 mi)	91.3 (2025) (Note: Figure extrapolated from 250,000 daily ridership.)
Panama Metro	Panama City	Panama	2014	2024	33	41.2 km (25.6 mi)	114.9 (2025) (Note: "Demanda Mensual Red de Metro" [Monthly Demand for the Metro Network] (in Spanish). El Metro de Panamá, S.A. January 2026. This ridership figure is derived from the sum of the twelve monthly subtotals for 2025)
Lima and Callao Metro	Lima	Peru	2011	2023	31	39.4 km (24.5 mi)	171.9 (2023)
Manila Light Rail Transit System	Manila	Philippines	1984	2024	38	43.5 km (27.0 mi)	218.2 (2019) (Note: This figure is the sum of the passenger ridership on the two LRTA lines, L1 and L2, from the accompanying reference; it is based on unlinked passenger trips (i.e. a transfer between two lines counts as two trips, etc.).)
Manila Metro Rail Transit System	Manila	Philippines	1999	2000	13	16.9 km (10.5 mi)	129 (2023)
Warsaw Metro	Warsaw	Poland	1995	2022	39	41.2 km (25.6 mi)	197.3 (2024)
Lisbon Metro	Lisbon	Portugal	1959	2016	56	44.2 km (27.5 mi)	161.8 (2023)
Doha Metro	Doha	Qatar	2019	2019	37	76 km (47 mi) (Note: Combined lengths of the Red, Green, and Gold lines.)	53.0 (2023)
Bucharest Metro	Bucharest	Romania	1979	2023	64	79.36 km (49.31 mi)	152.0 (2024)
Kazan Metro	Kazan	Russia	2005	2018	11	16.8 km (10.4 mi)	39.4 (2024)
Moscow Metro	Moscow	Russia	1935	2026	251 (Note: The number of stations is 249 if interchange stations (i.e. different sets of platforms in a single complex) are counted as one station, or 309 if all stations on all lines are counted each.)	541.9 km (336.7 mi)	2,288.5 (2023)
Nizhny Novgorod Metro	Nizhny Novgorod	Russia	1985	2018	15	21.8 km (13.5 mi)	35.9 (2024)
Novosibirsk Metro	Novosibirsk	Russia	1986	2025	14 (Note: The number of stations is 13 if interchange stations (i.e. different sets of platforms in a single complex) are counted as one station, or 14 if all stations on all lines are counted each.)	15.9 km (9.9 mi)	86.1 (2024)
Saint Petersburg Metro	Saint Petersburg	Russia	1955	2025	66 (Note: The number is 66 if interchange stations (i.e. different sets of platforms) are counted as one station, or 75 if all stations on all lines are counted multiple times for each line.)	131.3 km (81.6 mi)	686.1 (2024)
Samara Metro	Samara	Russia	1987	2015	10	12.7 km (7.9 mi)	12.6 (2024)
Yekaterinburg Metro	Yekaterinburg	Russia	1991	2012	9	12.7 km (7.9 mi)	48.6 (2024)
Mecca Metro	Mecca	Saudi Arabia	2010	–	9	18.1 km (11.2 mi)	1.87 (2025)
Riyadh Metro	Riyadh	Saudi Arabia	2024	2025	85	176 km (109 mi)	150 (2025)
Mass Rapid Transit	Singapore	Singapore	1987	2026	146	246.6 km (153.2 mi)	1,240 (2024) (Note: Figure extrapolated from 3,243,000 average daily ridership.)
Barcelona Metro (Note: TMB-operated lines L1–L5 and L9–L11 only. FGC-operated lines L6-L8 share track with other FGC commuter lines, and thus do not qualify as metro-standards lines.)	Barcelona	Spain	1924	2021	132 (Note: There are 132 stations in the Barcelona Metro if interchange stations are counted once, while there are 163 if they are counted multiple times.)	128.3 km (79.7 mi)	465 (2024)
Bilbao Metro (Note: CTB-owned and "Metro Bilbao S.A."-operated Line 1 and Line 2 only.)	Bilbao	Spain	1995	2020	42	45.1 km (28.0 mi)	104.5 (2025)
Madrid Metro (Note: Including TFM, MetroSur and other suburban lines, but not the three Metro Ligero de Madrid lines which are light rail.)	Madrid	Spain	1919	2025	242	296.4 km (184.2 mi)	715.0 (2024)
Stockholm Metro	Stockholm	Sweden	1950 (Note: The first line, later known as Green Line, was opened by stages during the 1950s, partly converting to metro operations prior rapid tram alignments. These included the oldest tunnel, built in 1933, which name (Tunnelbana) and symbol were bequeathed to the new system.)	1994	100	108 km (67 mi)	462 (2019) (Note: Figure extrapolated from 1 265 900 average daily boardings.)
Lausanne Metro (Note: The Lausanne Metro has two lines: Line M1 is light rail, while Line M2 is rapid transit. The stats listed are for Line M2 only.)	Lausanne	Switzerland	2008	–	14	5.9 km (3.7 mi)	36.0 (2024) (Note: Ridership figure is for rapid transit Line M2 only; ridership on the light rail M1 line is excluded.)
Kaohsiung Rapid Transit	Kaohsiung	Taiwan	2008	2024	38	45.5 km (28.3 mi)	71.3 (2025) (Note: "Statistics by KRTC". Kaohsiung Rapid Transit Corp. 6 January 2026. This ridership figure is derived from the sum of the twelve monthly subtotals for 2025)
New Taipei Metro	New Taipei	Taiwan	2026	-	12	14.29 km (8.88 mi)	n/a
Taipei Metro	Taipei	Taiwan	1996	2026	120 (Note: As of August 2026, the number is 132 if the 12 interchange stations (i.e. different sets of platforms) are counted multiple times, once for each line, while it's 120 if they are combined. Out-of-station transfers at Banqiao and Xinpu – Xinpu Minsheng, which require leaving paid area, are counted as 2 stations each; transfer stations that provide cross-platform interchange are anyway counted as a single stations (four in all: Ximen, CKS Memorial Hall, Guting and Dongmen stations).)	154.3 km (95.9 mi)	767.1 (2025) (Note: "Ridership Counts". Taipei Rapid Transit Corporation. 15 January 2026. This ridership figure is derived from the sum of the twelve monthly subtotals for 2025.)
Taichung MRT	Taichung	Taiwan	2021	–	18	16.7 km (10.4 mi)	17.2 (2025)
Taoyuan Metro	Taoyuan	Taiwan	2017	2023	22	53.1 km (33.0 mi)	46.6 (2025) (Note: 統計資料 [Statistics] (in Chinese). Taoyuan Metro Corporation. 12 February 2026. This ridership figure is derived from the sum of the twelve monthly subtotals for 2025)
BTS Skytrain	Bangkok	Thailand	1999	2021	64	70.05 km (43.53 mi)	266.7 (2024)
Metropolitan Rapid Transit	Bangkok	Thailand	2004	2025	109	133 km (83 mi)	213.1 (2024)
Adana Metro	Adana	Turkey	2009	2010	13	13.5 km (8.4 mi)	14 (2011)
Ankara Metro	Ankara	Turkey	1997	2023 (Note: Opening of line M4 extension to Kızılay station.)	57	67.4 km (41.9 mi)	158.5 (2023)
Bursaray	Bursa	Turkey	2002	2024	40	40 km (25 mi)	104.4 (2024)
Istanbul Metro	Istanbul	Turkey	1989	2026	155 (Note: As of June 2026, the number is 169 if the 14 interchange stations (i.e. different sets of platforms) are counted multiple times, once for each line, while it is 155 if they are combined.)	265.2 km (164.8 mi)	688.9 (2024)
İzmir Metro	İzmir	Turkey	2000	2024	24	27 km (17 mi)	93.8 (2024)
Dnipro Metro	Dnipro	Ukraine	1995	–	6	7.8 km (4.8 mi)	7.5 (2018)
Kharkiv Metro	Kharkiv	Ukraine	1975	2016	27 (Note: The number of stations is 27 if interchange stations (i.e. different sets of platforms in a single complex) are counted as one station, or 30 if all stations on all lines are counted each.)	38.7 km (24.0 mi)	231.1 (2018) (Note: Кількість перевезених пасажирів за видами транспорту [Number of passengers carried by transport mode]. kh.ukrstat.gov.ua (in Ukrainian). Державна служба статистики України [State statistic service of Ukraine]. Archived from the original on 4 April 2020. (You can select English from the language dropdown))
Kyiv Metro	Kyiv	Ukraine	1960	2013	49 (Note: The number of stations is 49 if interchange stations (i.e. different sets of platforms in a single complex) are counted as one station, or 52 if all stations on all lines are counted each.)	67.7 km (42.1 mi)	496.1 (2018)
Dubai Metro	Dubai	United Arab Emirates	2009	2021	53	89.3 km (55.5 mi)	294.7 (2025)
Glasgow Subway	Glasgow	United Kingdom	1896	–	15	10.4 km (6.5 mi)	13.1 (2024)
London Underground	London	United Kingdom	1890 (Note: London's Metropolitan Railway first opened for service in 1863, operating steam locomotive trains in cut and cover tunnels. It began operating as a modern metro when electric-propulsion trains began operating on the system's first deep-level tube line in 1890.)	2021	272	402 km (250 mi)	1,216 (2024) (Note: Does not include ridership on the separate Docklands Light Railway (98 million), London Overground (183 million), Tramlink or National Rail systems within Greater London.)
Docklands Light Railway	London	United Kingdom	1987	2011	45	34 km (21 mi)	99 (2024)
MARTA	Atlanta	United States	1979	2000	38	76.6 km (47.6 mi)	30.4 (2025)
Baltimore Metro SubwayLink	Baltimore	United States	1983	1995	14	24.9 km (15.5 mi)	4.6 (2025)
MBTA subway (Note: Includes only heavy rail lines: Red Line, Orange Line, and Blue Line. Does not include the Green Line and Mattapan Line, which are light rail lines, and the Silver Line, which is a bus rapid transit.)	Boston	United States	1901 (Note: The originally-elevated Orange Line opened in 1901, sharing the Tremont Street Subway that had opened in 1897 as an underground streetcar tunnel (for the light rail Green Line).)	2014	52	63.9 km (39.7 mi)	101.1 (2025)
Chicago "L"	Chicago	United States	1892 (Note: Dated from the opening of the South Side Elevated on 6 June 1892. The "L" was first electrified in 1895 when the Metropolitan West Side Elevated opened. The entire system was unified and electrified in 1897 with the construction of the Union Loop. The first underground section opened in 1943 as the State Street Subway.)	2024	146	165.4 km (102.8 mi) (Note: This figure comes from the sum of the following figures from the accompanying reference (i.e. "Facts at a Glance". Chicago Transit Authority. December 2012.): 35.8 miles of elevated route, 35.0 miles at grade level, 20.6 miles on embankments, and 11.4 miles of subway.)	135.2 (2025)
Red Line (RTA Rapid Transit)	Cleveland	United States	1955	1968	18	31 km (19 mi)	2.9 (2025)
Skyline	Honolulu	United States	2023	2025	13	25.9 km (16.1 mi)	1.7 (2025)
Metro Rail (Note: Rapid transit B and D lines only. All other L.A. Metro Rail lines are light rail, and are not included here.)	Los Angeles	United States	1993	2026	19	34.31 km (21.32 mi)	21.0 (2025)
Metrorail	Miami	United States	1984	2012	23	39.3 km (24.4 mi)	15.0 (2025)
New York City Subway	New York City	United States	1904 (Note: First regular elevated railway service, originally cable hauled, began in 1868. Elevateds converted to steam power in 1870, electrified by 1903. The first section of electrified subway opened in 1904.)	2017	424 (Note: The number is 423 if station complexes (with multiple sets of platforms connected by walkways) are counted as one station, or 472 if all stations on all lines are counted multiple times for each line.)	399 km (248 mi)	1,282 (2025) (Note: The American Public Transportation Association typically presents figures derived from unlinked transit passenger trips (i.e. a transfer between two lines counts as two passenger trips, transferring twice counts as three trips, etc.), which in the case of New York City were 2,314.4 billion in 2025.)
Staten Island Railway	New York City	United States	1925 (Note: While the line opened as a railroad in 1860, it was not until 1925 that rapid transit equipment would be operated here.)	2017	21	22.5 km (14.0 mi)	5.4 (2025)
PATH	New York City	United States	1908	1937 (Note: The last completely new stations were the current Newark and Harrison stations, which respectively replaced the Park Place and Harrison stations on a different alignment in 1937. According to PATH, its newest station is World Trade Center, which was completed in 2015 but replaced a previous station on the same site.)	13	22.2 km (13.8 mi)	64.3 (2025)
SEPTA Metro: L, B, M	Philadelphia	United States	1907	1973	53	59.1 km (36.7 mi)	65.5 (2025)
PATCO Speedline	Philadelphia	United States	1936 (Note: Opening of the Bridge Line, the precursor rapid transit line to PATCO's, which ran between 8th Street in Philadelphia and Broadway in Camden. The current PATCO Speedline, with service through to Lindenwold, opened in 1969.)	2025	14	22.9 km (14.2 mi)	5.9 (2025)
BART (Note: BART's rapid transit lines only; the eBART line to Antioch and the Oakland International Airport (OAK) APM are excluded.)	San Francisco (Bay Area)	United States	1972	2020	47 (Note: 47 rapid transit stations, plus three additional stations (two eBART and one AGT) within the system.)	192 km (119 mi) (Note: This figure excludes the eBART extension from Pittsburg/Bay Point to Antioch (9.2 miles) and the "BART to Oakland International Airport (OAK) elevated guideway" (3.2 miles).)	53.7 (2025)
Washington Metro	Washington, D.C.	United States	1976	2023	98	208 km (129 mi)	188.5 (2025)
Tren Urbano	San Juan	United States	2004	2005	16	17.2 km (10.7 mi)	4.4 (2024)
Tashkent Metro	Tashkent	Uzbekistan	1977	2024	45 (Note: The number of stations is 45 if interchange stations (i.e. different sets of platforms in a single complex) are counted as one station, or 50 if all stations on all lines are counted each.)	70.8 km (44.0 mi)	270.3 (2024)
Caracas Metro (Note: Statistics presented here include the Los Teques Metro which functions as effectively a subsidiary and extension of the Caracas Metro.)	Caracas	Venezuela	1983	2015	49 (Note: By the end of 2014, Caracas Metro had a length of 54.03 km and 47 stations; further 1.3 km was added with the single-station extension to Bello Monte in the following year. Los Teques Metro contributes to the system's total with 11.9 km in length and four stations.)	67.2 km (41.8 mi)	164.3 (2025) (Note: Figure extrapolated from 450,000 average daily ridership)
Maracaibo Metro	Maracaibo	Venezuela	2006	–	6	6.5 km (4.0 mi)	n/a
Metro Valencia	Valencia	Venezuela	2006	–	9	6.2 km (3.9 mi)	n/a
Hanoi Metro	Hanoi	Vietnam	2021	2024	20	21.6 km (13.4 mi)	20.65 (2025)
Ho Chi Minh City Metro	Ho Chi Minh City	Vietnam	2024	–	14	19.7 km (12.2 mi)	20.5 (2025)

== List by countries ==
Recent ridership figures, particularly for 2020, will have been affected by the COVID-19 pandemic.

Country	Systems	Length	Lines	Stations	Annual ridership / km (millions)	Inauguration
Algeria	1	18.5 km (11.5 mi)	1	19	2.40 (2019)	2011
Argentina	1	56.7 km (35.2 mi)	7	104	4.16 (2022)	1913
Armenia	1	13.4 km (8.3 mi)	1	10	1.93 (2022)	1981
Australia	1	65 km (40 mi)	1	31	1.38 (2025)	2019
Austria	1	83.3 km (51.8 mi)	5	109	5.51 (2019)	1978
Azerbaijan	1	40.7 km (25.3 mi)	3	27	4.98 (2022)	1967
Bangladesh	1	21.3 km (13.2 mi)	1	16	n/a	2022
Belarus	1	44.9 km (27.9 mi)	3	36	5.54 (2022)	1984
Belgium	1	39.9 km (24.8 mi)	4	59	2.19 (2020)	1976
Brazil	8	391.2 km (243.1 mi)	22	284	3.45 (2018–20)	1974
Bulgaria	1	55 km (34 mi)	4	50	1.79 (2018)	1998
Canada	4	283.3 km (176.0 mi)	11	215	3.01 (2024)	1954
Chile	1	149 km (93 mi)	7	143	1.88 (2020)	1975
China	47	12,432.246 km (7,725.040 mi)	339	6594	2.10 (2020) (Note: Excluding Shaoxing, Taiyuan, and Luoyang systems, which had no data.)	1971
Colombia	1	31.3 km (19.4 mi)	2	27	6.47 (2025)	1995
Czech Republic	1	65.4 km (40.6 mi)	3	61	3.85 (2020)	1974
Denmark	1	43.3 km (26.9 mi)	4	44	3.13 (2023)	2002
Dominican Republic	1	38.6 km (24.0 mi)	2	38	1.60 (2020)	2009
Ecuador	1	22.6 km (14.0 mi)	1	15	n/a	2023
Egypt	1	106.8 km (66.4 mi)	3	84	7.45 (2020)	1987
Finland	1	43 km (27 mi)	2	30	1.84 (2023)	1982
France	6	398.3 km (247.5 mi)	28	517	3.70 (2019–20)	1900
Georgia	1	27.3 km (17.0 mi)	2	23	2.74 (2022)	1966
Germany	4	386.8 km (240.3 mi)	24	413	3.59 (2019)	1902
Greece	2	105.8 km (65.7 mi)	5	84	2.92 (2018)	1904
Hungary	1	39.4 km (24.5 mi)	4	48	9.71 (2023)	1896
India	21	1,135.029 km (705.274 mi)	50	865	3.70 (2021) (Note: Excluding Kanpur and Pune systems which had no data.)	1984
Indonesia	4	95.8 km (59.5 mi)	5	55	0.63 (2020)	2018
Iran	6	348.3 km (216.4 mi)	18	266	4.08 (2018) (Note: Excluding Isfahan, Karaj and Tabriz systems which had no data.)	1999
Italy	7	257.1 km (159.8 mi)	16	292	3.73 (2018–19)	1955
Japan	21	905.9 km (562.9 mi)	55	749	8.19 (2019)	1927
Kazakhstan	2	35.8 km (22.2 mi)	2	29	1.27 (2022)	2011
Malaysia	1	241.6 km (150.1 mi)	7	159	1.60 (2023)	1996
Mexico	3	287.5 km (178.6 mi)	18	283	4.37 (2020) (Note: Excluding Guadalajara system which had no data.)	1969
Netherlands	2	143.5 km (89.2 mi)	10	109	1.48 (2019)	1968
Nigeria	1	13 km (8.1 mi)	1	5	n/a	2023
North Korea	1	22 km (14 mi)	2	16	1.63 (2009)	1973
Norway	1	85 km (53 mi)	5	101	0.87 (2020)	1966
Pakistan	1	27.1 km (16.8 mi)	1	26	0.74 (2020–2021)	2020
Panama	1	41.2 km (25.6 mi)	2	33	1.38 (2020)	2014
Peru	1	39.4 km (24.5 mi)	2	31	3.19 (2018)	2011
Philippines	2	60.2 km (37.4 mi)	3	51	5.82 (2019)	1984
Poland	1	41.2 km (25.6 mi)	2	34	5.50 (2019)	1995
Portugal	1	44.2 km (27.5 mi)	4	56	1.93 (2020)	1959
Qatar	1	76 km (47 mi)	3	37	n/a	2019
Romania	1	79.36 km (49.31 mi)	5	64	1.6 (2023)	1979
Russia	7	753.1 km (468.0 mi)	30	376	4.62 (2022)	1935
Saudi Arabia	2	194.1 km (120.6 mi)	7	94	1.87 (2025)	2010
Singapore	1	246.6 km (153.2 mi)	8	146	3.41 (2024)	1987
South Korea	6	760.7 km (472.7 mi)	38	686	3.87 (2019)	1974
Spain	4	527.88 km (328.01 mi)	23	539	1.43 (2019)	1919
Sweden	1	108 km (67 mi)	7	100	3.10 (2018)	1950
Switzerland	1	5.9 km (3.7 mi)	1 (Note: Lausanne Metro Line M1 (with 28 stations), is considered light rail)	14	5.55 (2019)	2008
Taiwan	5	274.39 km (170.50 mi)	12	244	3.26 (2019–20) (Note: Excluding Taichung system which had no data.)	1996
Thailand	2	203.05 km (126.17 mi)	7	173	2.11 (2023)	1999
Turkey	5	413.1 km (256.7 mi)	18	289	1.94 (2019–20) (Note: Excluding Adana and Bursa systems which had very old data.)	1989
Ukraine	3	114.2 km (71.0 mi)	7	88	6.43 (2022)	1960
United Arab Emirates	1	89.5 km (55.6 mi)	3	53	1.26 (2020)	2009
United Kingdom	3	446.4 km (277.4 mi)	19	332	2.11 (2022)	1863
United States	16	1,395.71 km (867.25 mi)	71	1,083	1.66 (2022)	1892
Uzbekistan	1	70.8 km (44.0 mi)	4	50	2.32 (2022)	1977
Venezuela	2	67.2 km (41.8 mi)	5	49	5.32 (2017)	1983
Vietnam	2	41.3 km (25.7 mi)	3	34	0.99 (2025)	2021

== Under construction ==
The following is a list of new worldwide metro systems that are currently actively under construction. In some cases it is not clear if the system will be considered a full metro system once it begins operational service. Only metro systems under construction are listed where there are no metro systems currently in operation in the same city.

The countries of Ivory Coast, Israel, and Serbia are currently constructing their first ever metro systems.

Name	City	Country	Construction started	Projected opening
Suburban Rail Loop	Melbourne	Australia	2022	2035
Bogotá Metro	Bogotá	Colombia	2020	2028
Alexandria Metro	Alexandria	Egypt	2020	2027
Surat Metro	Surat	India	2021	2026
Thane Metro	Thane	India	2025	2029
Ahvaz Metro	Ahvaz	Iran	2004	2028
Qom Urban Railway	Qom	Iran	2009	2026
Tel Aviv Metro	Tel Aviv	Israel	2025	2032
Abidjan Metro	Abidjan	Ivory Coast	2017	2028
Mutiara LRT	George Town	Malaysia	2025	2031
Rapid Transit System Link	Johor Bahru; Singapore	Malaysia; Singapore	2020	2027
Cluj-Napoca Metro	Cluj-Napoca	Romania	2024	2031
Belgrade Metro	Belgrade	Serbia	2021	2033
İzmit Metro (Körfezray)	İzmit	Turkey	2024	2028
Gebze Metro	Gebze	Turkey	2018	2027

== See also ==
- List of longest subway tunnel sections
- List of high-speed railway lines
- List of maglev train proposals
- Inter-city rail#List of inter-city rail by country
- List of railway electrification systems
- List of countries by rail usage
- Lists of named passenger trains
- Regional rail#List of regional rail in different countries
- List of suburban and commuter rail systems
- List of airport rail link systems
- List of airport people mover systems
- List of semi-automatic train systems
- List of rack railways
- Mountain railway#List of mountain railways
- List of inclined elevators
- List of funicular railways
- List of aerial tramways
- List of gondola lifts
- Rubber-tyred metro#List of rubber-tyred metro systems
- Personal rapid transit#List of operational automated transit networks (ATN) systems
- List of monorail systems
- Suspension railway#List of suspension railways
- People mover#Examples
- List of premetro systems
- List of rapid transit systems by track gauge
- Light metro#List of light metro systems
- Interurban#List of Interurban systems
- Tram-train#List of tram-train systems
- List of tram and light rail transit systems
- List of tram systems by gauge and electrification
- List of town tramway systems
- List of battery operated trams
- Rubber-tyred tram#Retired systems
- Translohr#List of translohr systems
- List of trolleybus systems
- List of current operating trolleybus systems
- Guided bus#List of guided busways systems
- Autonomous Rapid Transit#ART systems
- Electric bus#List of electric buses
- List of bus rapid transit systems
- List of bus operating companies

=== By region ===
- Urban rail transit in Africa
- Urban rail transit in China
- Urban rail transit in India
- Urban rail transit in Japan
- List of metro systems in Europe
- List of Latin American rail transit systems
- List of North American rapid transit systems

== Sources ==
=== Bibliography ===
- Vuchic, Vukan R. (2007). Urban Transit Systems and Technology. John Wiley & Sons. ISBN 978-0-471-75823-5.
- Ovenden, Mark (2005). Metro Maps Of The World. Capital Transport. ISBN 1-85414-288-7.
- Hinkel, W.; Treiber, K.; Valenta, G.; Liebsch, H. (2004). Underground Railways Yesterday – Today – Tomorrow. Schmid Verlag. ISBN 3-900607-44-3.
- Fischler, Stan (2000). Subways Of The World. MBI. ISBN 0-7603-0752-0.
- Garbutt, Paul (1997). World Metro Systems. Capital Transport. ISBN 1-85414-191-0.

=== Online resources ===
- "Metros: Keeping pace with 21st century cities". uitp.org. International Association of Public Transport (French: L'Union internationale des transports publics (UITP)). 8 May 2014. Archived from the original on 6 October 2014.
- Taplin, Michael. "A world of trams and urban transit". lrta.org. Light Rail Transit Association. Archived from the original on 8 October 2007.
- Schwandl, Robert. "UrbanRail.Net". UrbanRail.Net.
