= Dalianwan =

Dalianwan may refer to:

- Dalian Bay, Liaoning Province, China (Chinese: 大连湾; pinyin: dàliánwān)
- Dalianwan Station, Dalian Metro
