= Rapid transit in Turkey =

Location of Metro systems. Blue dots indicate systems that are under construction

Rapid transit in Turkey refers to the extensive network of urban rail systems serving major cities throughout Turkey. The rapid transit networks in the country consist primarily of metro, light rail, and tram systems.

== History ==
The Istanbul Metro, which opened its first line in 1989, marked the beginning of rapid transit development in Turkey. In the late 90s and early 2000s, other cities, such as Ankara and Bursa, initiated their own transit systems.

== Current systems ==
City	Name	Service opened	Last expanded	Stations	Lines	System length	Annual ridership (millions)
Adana	Adana Metro	2009	2010	13	1	13.5 km (8.4 mi)	14 (2011)
Ankara	Ankara Metro	1997	2023	57	3	67.4 km (41.9 mi)	158.5 (2023)
Bursa	Bursaray	2002	2014	40	2	40 km (25 mi)	91.3 (2010)
Istanbul	Istanbul Metro	1989	2024	146	11	243.3 km (151.2 mi)	542 (2022)
İzmir	İzmir Metro	2000	2024	24	1	27 km (17 mi)	100 (2019)

== Under construction ==
City	Name	Construction started	Projected opening	Lines	Stations	Length by first opening
Gebze	Gebze Metro	2018	2026	1	12	15.4 km (9.6 mi)
Konya	Konya Metro	2020	2025	1	22	21.1 km (13.1 mi)
Mersin	Mersin Metro	2022	2026	1	11	13.4 km (8.3 mi)

== See also ==
- Transportation in Turkey
- List of metro systems
