= Xinghua Subdistrict, Dalian =

Xinghua Subdistrict 兴华街道
- Subdistrict
- Location in Liaoning
- Coordinates: 38°57′42″N 121°33′52″E
- Country: People's Republic of China
- Province: Liaoning
- Sub-provincial city: Dalian
- District: Ganjingzi
- Village-level divisions: 13 residential communities
- Elevation: 33 m (108 ft)
- Time zone: UTC+8 (China Standard)
- Postal code: 116033
- Area code: 0411

Xinghua Subdistrict (simplified Chinese: 兴华街道; traditional Chinese: 興華街道; pinyin: Xīnghuá Jiēdào) is a subdistrict of Ganjingzi District, Dalian, People's Republic of China, located to the east of Dalian Zhoushuizi International Airport. As of 2011, it has 13 residential communities (社区) under its administration.

In 2019, Xinghua Subdistrict was abolished, its former administrative area merged into Zhonghua Road Subdistrict.

== See also ==
- List of township-level divisions of Liaoning
