= Dalian Mosque =

Mosque in Dalian, Liaoning, China

- 大连市清真寺
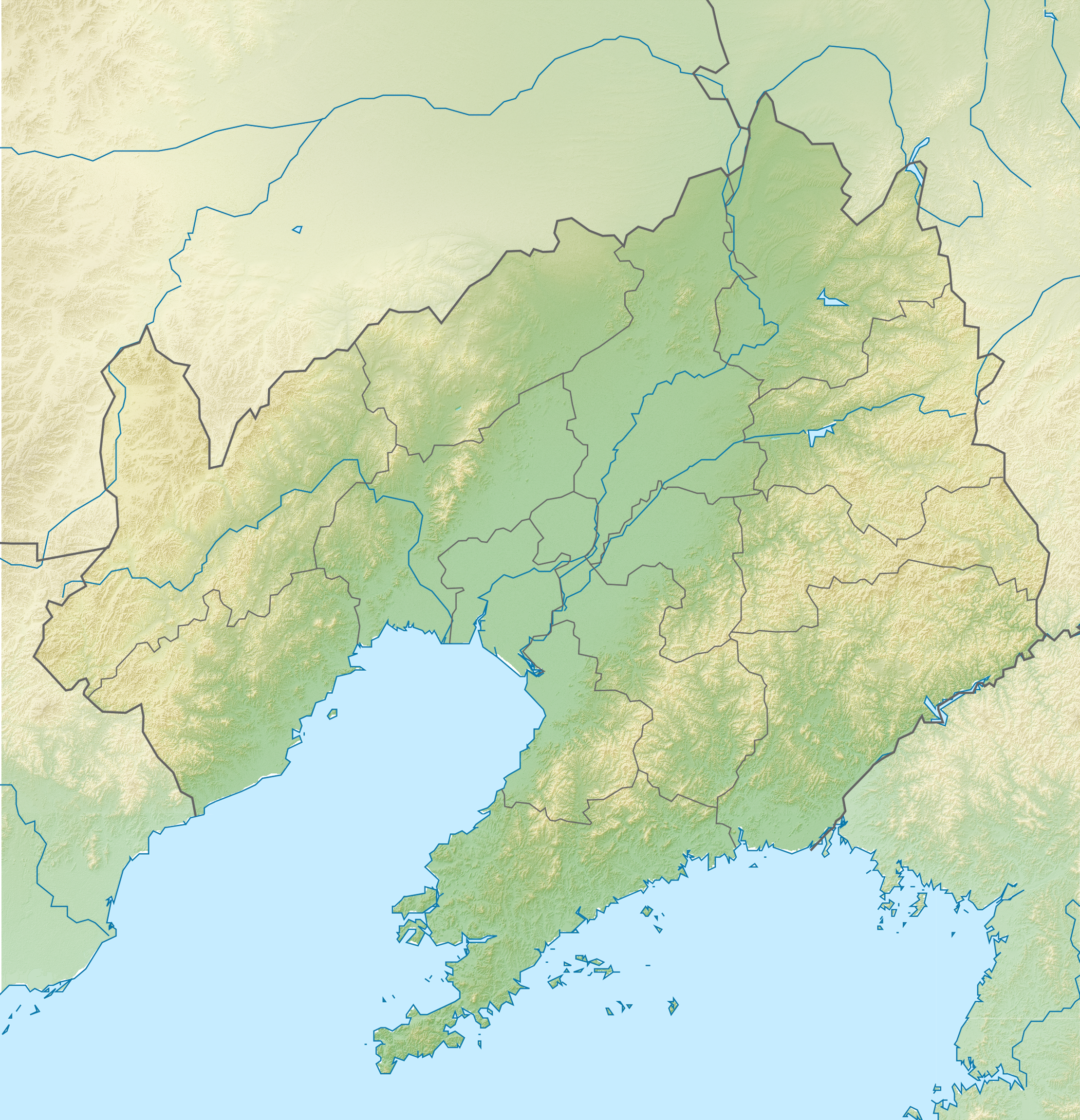
- Location of the mosque in Liaoning

Religion
- Affiliation: Sunni Islam
- Ecclesiastical or organizational status: Mosque
- Status: Active

Location
- Location: Xigang, Dalian, Liaoning
- Country: China
- Interactive map of Dalian Mosque
- Coordinates: 38°54′58″N 121°36′46″E

Architecture
- Type: Mosque
- Style: Islamic
- Groundbreaking: 1922
- Completed: 1925

Specifications
- Capacity: 300 worshipers
- Interior area: 1,200 m^{2} (13,000 sq ft)
- Dome: 1

The Dalian Mosque (simplified Chinese: 大连市清真寺; traditional Chinese: 大連市清真寺; pinyin: Dàlián Shì Qīngzhēnsì) is a mosque in the Xigang District of Dalian, a city in the Liaoning province of China. It is located at 96 Beijing Jie.

== Overview ==
Construction began in 1922 and was completed in 1925. The ahong of the mosque, Hajji Bai Yunxing (白云兴), has served as ahong since 1958, with the exception of the period during the Cultural Revolution until 1979 when the mosque did not operate.

The mosque covers an area of 1,200 square metres (13,000 sq ft), with capacity for 300 worshipers. The three-storey mosque was completed in the Islamic style. The entrance hall is topped with a green dome and has a huge tower on each of the four corners. The building is decorated with white and green glazed tiles. The first floor is the wudu; the second floor is the office of imams, and third floor serves as the prayer hall.

As of 2005, it was one of ten mosques in the city of Dalian.

== Transportation ==
The mosque is accessible within walking distance southeast of Xianglujiao Station of Dalian Metro.

== See also ==
Dalian Mosque
- Traditional Chinese: 大連市清真寺
- Simplified Chinese: 大连市清真寺
Transcriptions
Standard Mandarin
- Hanyu Pinyin: Dàlián Shì Qīngzhēnsì

- List of mosques in China
- Islam in China
