= Houyan =

Houyan may refer to:

- Houyan Station, a station on line 3 of the Dalian Metro
- Hòuyàn, also known as Later Yan, a former state located in modern-day northeast China during the era of Sixteen Kingdoms
