= Beijing Subdistrict, Dalian =

Beijing Subdistrict 北京街道
- Subdistrict
- Location in Liaoning
- Coordinates: 38.9160°N 121.6162°E
- Country: People's Republic of China
- Province: Liaoning
- Prefecture-level city: Dalian
- District: Xigang District
- Time zone: UTC+8 (China Standard)

Beijing Subdistrict (Chinese: 北京街道; pinyin: Běijīng Jiēdào) is a subdistrict in Xigang District, Dalian, Liaoning province, China. As of 2018, it has 7 residential communities under its administration.

== See also ==
- List of township-level divisions of Liaoning
