= Line 12 (Dalian Metro) =

Metro line in Dalian, China

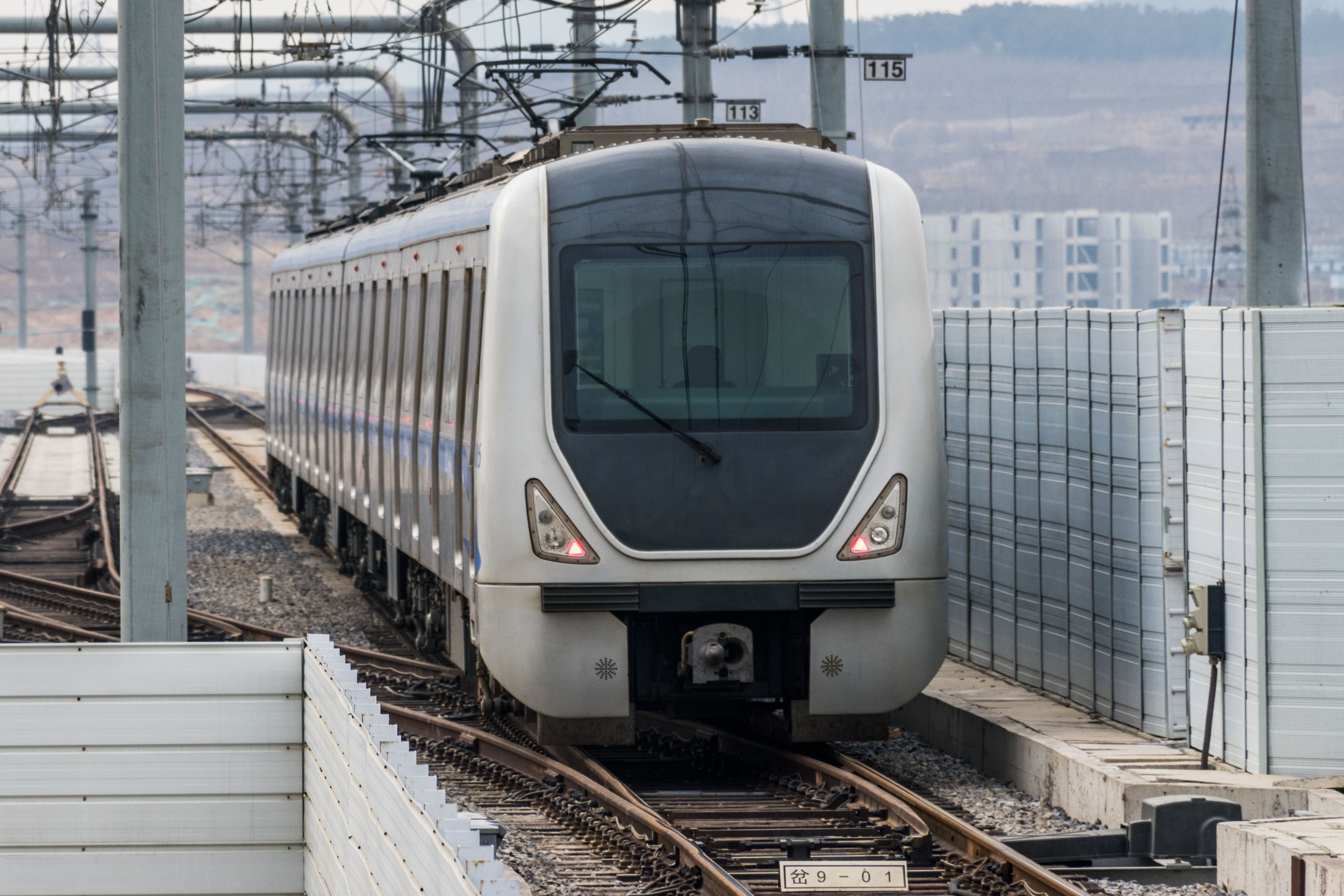
- A train of Dalian Metro Line 12

Overview
- Other name(s): Tram Route 202 Extension Line; R2; Dalian–Lüshunkou intercity railway (Chinese: 大连旅顺口城际轨道交通; pinyin: Dàlián Lǚshùnkǒu Chéngjì Guǐdào Jiāotōng)
- Status: Operational
- Owner: Dalian
- Locale: Dalian, Liaoning, China
- Termini: Hekou; Lüshun New Port
- Stations: 8

Service
- Type: Rapid transit
- System: Dalian Metro
- Services: 1
- Operator(s): Dalian Metro Group Co., Ltd.

History
- Opened: May 1, 2014; 12 years ago

Technical
- Line length: 40.38 km (25.09 mi)
- Number of tracks: 2
- Character: Elevated
- Track gauge: 1,435 mm (4 ft 8 1/2 in)

Line 12 of the Dalian Metro (Chinese: 大连地铁12号线; pinyin: Dàlián Dìtiě Shí'èr Hào Xiàn) is a rapid transit line running in northern Dalian. It opened on 1 May 2014.

The line connects central Dalian with Lüshunkou over 40.38 kilometres (25.09 mi) with 8 stations from east to west. This line begins at Hekou station and stretches southwest ending at Lüshun New Port station. Similar to Line 3, all the stations have side platforms with tracks in the platform area have no ballast (gravel); however, tracks outside the station are on ballast. Also all stations are covered by a combination of transparent corrugated sheets and a concrete roof.

In October 2017, most station names were re-translated from Pinyin into conventional English.

== Opening timeline ==
Segment	Commencement	Length	Station(s)	Name
Caidaling — Lüshun New Port	1 May 2014	40.38 km (25.09 mi)	7	Phase 1 (initial section)
Hekou — Caidaling	7 June 2017	40.38 km (25.09 mi)	1	Phase 1 (final section)

== Stations ==
Station name		Connections	Distance km		Location
English	Chinese	Connections	Distance km		Location
Hekou	河口	1 Dalian Tram	0.00	0.00	Ganjingzi
Caidaling	蔡大岭		2.05	2.05	Ganjingzi
Huangnichuan	黄泥川		4.25	6.30	Lüshunkou
Longwangtang	龙王塘		5.50	11.80	Lüshunkou
Tahewan	塔河湾		7.20	19.00	Lüshunkou
Lüshun	旅顺		8.67	27.67	Lüshunkou
Tieshan	铁山		8.98	36.65	Lüshunkou
Lüshun New Port	旅顺新港		3.73	40.38	Lüshunkou
