= Rapid transit in France =

Overview of the rapid transit system in France

There are several rapid transit systems in France. Lille, Lyon, Marseille, Paris, Rennes and Toulouse all have metro systems. Twenty-six French cities have light rail and tram systems.

== Metros ==
Location	Name	Year opened	Stations	Total route length	Year of last extension
Lille	Lille Metro	1983	60	45 km (28 mi)	2000
Lyon	Lyon Metro	1974	42	34.4 km (21.4 mi)	2023 (Note: Extension of Lyon Metro's Line B to Saint-Genis-Laval Hôpital Lyon Sud station.)
Marseille	Marseille Metro	1977	31	22.7 km (14.1 mi)	2019
Paris	Paris Métro	1900	321	245.6 km (152.6 mi)	2025
Rennes	Rennes Metro	2002	28	22.4 km (13.9 mi)	2022
Toulouse	Toulouse Metro	1993	37	28.2 km (17.5 mi)	2007 (Note: Opening of Toulouse Metro's Line B.)

== Trams and light rail ==
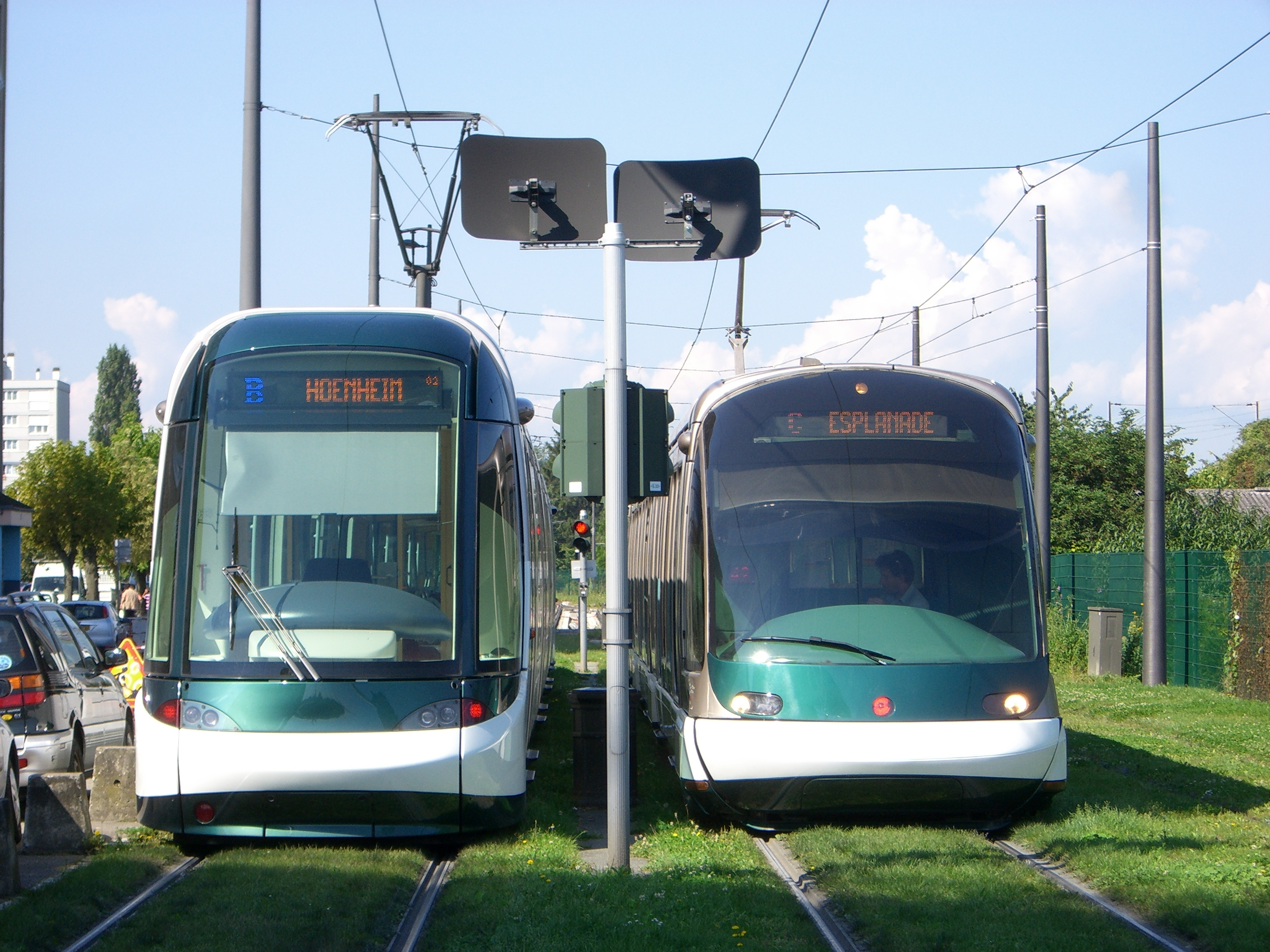
Citadis (left) and Eurotram (right) cars in Strasbourg

Trams in France go back to 1837 when a 15 km (9.32 mi) steamtram line connected Montrond-les-Bains and Montbrison in the Loire. With the development of electric trams at the end of the 19th century, networks proliferated in French cities over a period of 15 years. Although nearly all of the country's tram systems were replaced by bus services in the 1930s or shortly after World War II, France is now in the forefront of the revival of tramways and light rail systems around the globe. Only trams lines in Lille and Saint-Étienne have operated continuously since the 19th century. Since the opening of the Nantes tramway in 1985, more than twenty towns and cities across France have built new tram lines. As of 2026, there are 25 operational tram networks in France, with 3 under construction and 4 more planned. France is also home to Alstom, a leading tram manufacturer.

=== List of trams and light rail systems ===
Location	Relevant Wikipedia article	Year opened	Stations	Total route length	Type
Angers	Angers tramway	2011	42	22.4 km (13.9 mi)	Tram
Annemasse (Geneva, CH)	Trams in Geneva	1862	4 (82 in Switzerland)	38.1 km (23.7 mi)	Tram
Avignon	Avignon tramway	2019	10	5.2 km (3.2 mi)	Tram
Bordeaux	Bordeaux tramway	2003	130	77.3 km (48.0 mi)	Tram
Brest	Brest tramway	2012	39	19.4 km (12.1 mi)	Tram
Caen	Caen tramway	2019	37	16.2 km (10.1 mi)	Tram
Clermont-Ferrand	Clermont-Ferrand tramway	2006	34	15.7 km (9.8 mi)	Translohr
Dijon	Dijon tramway	2012	35	19 km (12 mi)	Tram
Grenoble	Grenoble tramway	1987	82	43.7 km (27.2 mi)	Tram
Le Havre	Le Havre tramway	2012	23	13 km (8.1 mi)	Tram
Le Mans	Le Mans tramway	2007	35	18.8 km (11.7 mi)	Tram
Lille (to Roubaix and Tourcoing)	Lille tramway	1909	36	17.5 km (10.9 mi)	Tram
Lyon	Lyon tramway	2001	111	83.3 km (51.8 mi)	Tram
Lyon	Rhônexpress (airport commuter)	2010	4	23 km (14 mi)	Tram/Interurban
Marseille	Marseille tramway	2007	32	13 km (8.1 mi)	Tram
Montpellier	Montpellier tramway	2000	84	60.5 km (37.6 mi)	Tram
Mulhouse	Mulhouse tramway	2006	29	16.2 km (10.1 mi)	Tram
Nantes	Nantes tramway	1985	83	44.3 km (27.5 mi)	Tram
Nice	Nice tramway	2007	46	24.2 km (15.0 mi)	Tram
Orléans	Orléans tramway	2000	51	29.3 km (18.2 mi)	Tram
Paris	Tramways in Île-de-France	1992	278	196.5 km (122.1 mi)	Tram, Translohr, Tram-train
Reims	Reims tramway	2011	24	11.2 km (7.0 mi)	Tram
Rouen	Rouen tramway	1994	31	15.1 km (9.4 mi)	Tram
Saint-Etienne	Saint-Étienne tramway	1881	39	16.3 km (10.1 mi)	Tram
Sarreguemines (Saarbrücken, DE)	Saarbahn	1997	1 (42 in Germany)	44.0 km (27.3 mi)	Tram-train
Strasbourg	Strasbourg tramway	1994	83 (3 in Germany)	49.1 km (30.5 mi)	Tram
Toulouse	Toulouse tramway	2010	28	11.7 km (7.3 mi)	Tram
Tours	Tours tramway	2013	29	15 km (9.3 mi)	Tram
