= Rapid transit in Spain =

Overview of the rapid transit system in Spain

Rapid transit in Spain consists of four metro systems, three hybrid metro-suburban systems. Spain also has several light rail systems, some with sections built to rapid transit standards.

== Rapid transit systems ==
City	System	Start of operations	System length	Lines (Note: Indicates lines that are in operation for operational systems, lines that are under construction for under construction systems and proposed lines for proposed systems.)	Stations (Note: Indicates stations that are in operation for operational systems, stations that are under construction for under construction systems and proposed stations for proposed systems.)	Gauge	Operator
Barcelona	Barcelona Metro	1924	170 km (110 mi)	12	189	1,000 mm (3 ft 3 3/8 in) (L8); 1,668 mm (5 ft 5 21/32 in) (L1); 1,435 mm (4 ft 8 1/2 in) (all other lines)	TMB/FGC
Bilbao	Bilbao Metro	11 November 1995	43.28 km (26.9 mi)	3	48	1,000 mm (3 ft 3 3/8 in)	Biscay Transport Consortium (CTB)
Madrid	Madrid Metro	17 October 1919	296.6 km (184.3 mi)	13	301	1,445 mm (4 ft 8 7/8 in) (All metro lines); 1,435 mm (4 ft 8 1/2 in) (Metro Ligero)	Metro de Madrid
Seville	Seville Metro	2 April 2009	18 km (11 mi)	1	21	1,435 mm (4 ft 8 1/2 in)	Sociedad Concesionaria de la Junta de Andalucía

== Hybrid metro/suburban systems ==
City	System	Start of operations	System length	Lines	Stations	Gauge	Operator
Cadiz	Trambahía	26 October 2022	24 km (14.9 mi)	1	22	1,668 mm (5 ft 5+21/32 in)	Renfe
Palma de Mallorca	Palma Metro	25 April 2007	15.6 km (9.7 mi)	2	16	1,000 mm (3 ft 3 3/8 in)	SFM
Valencia	Metrovalencia	5 May 1995	156.4 km (97.2 mi)	9	137	1,000 mm (3 ft 3 3/8 in)	FGV

== Light rail systems ==
City	System	Start of operations	System length	Lines	Stations	Gauge	Operator
Granada	Granada Metro	21 September 2017	15.92 km (9.9 mi)	1	26	1,445 mm (4 ft 8+7/8 in),	Metro De Granada/ Junta de Andalucía
Málaga	Málaga Metro	30 July 2014	11.3 km (7 mi)	2	17	1,435 mm (4 ft 8+1/2 in)	Metro de Málaga
