= People's Square station =

People's Square station may refer to:

- People's Square station (Hangzhou Metro), Zhejiang, China
- People's Square station (Shanghai Metro), Shanghai, China
- People's Square station (Shenyang Metro), Liaoning, China
- Wujiang Renmin Guangchang station, Suzhou, Jiangsu, China
