= Houyan station =

Metro station in Liaoning Province, China

Coordinates: 39°01′17″N 121°38′16″E

Houyan 后盐 METRO
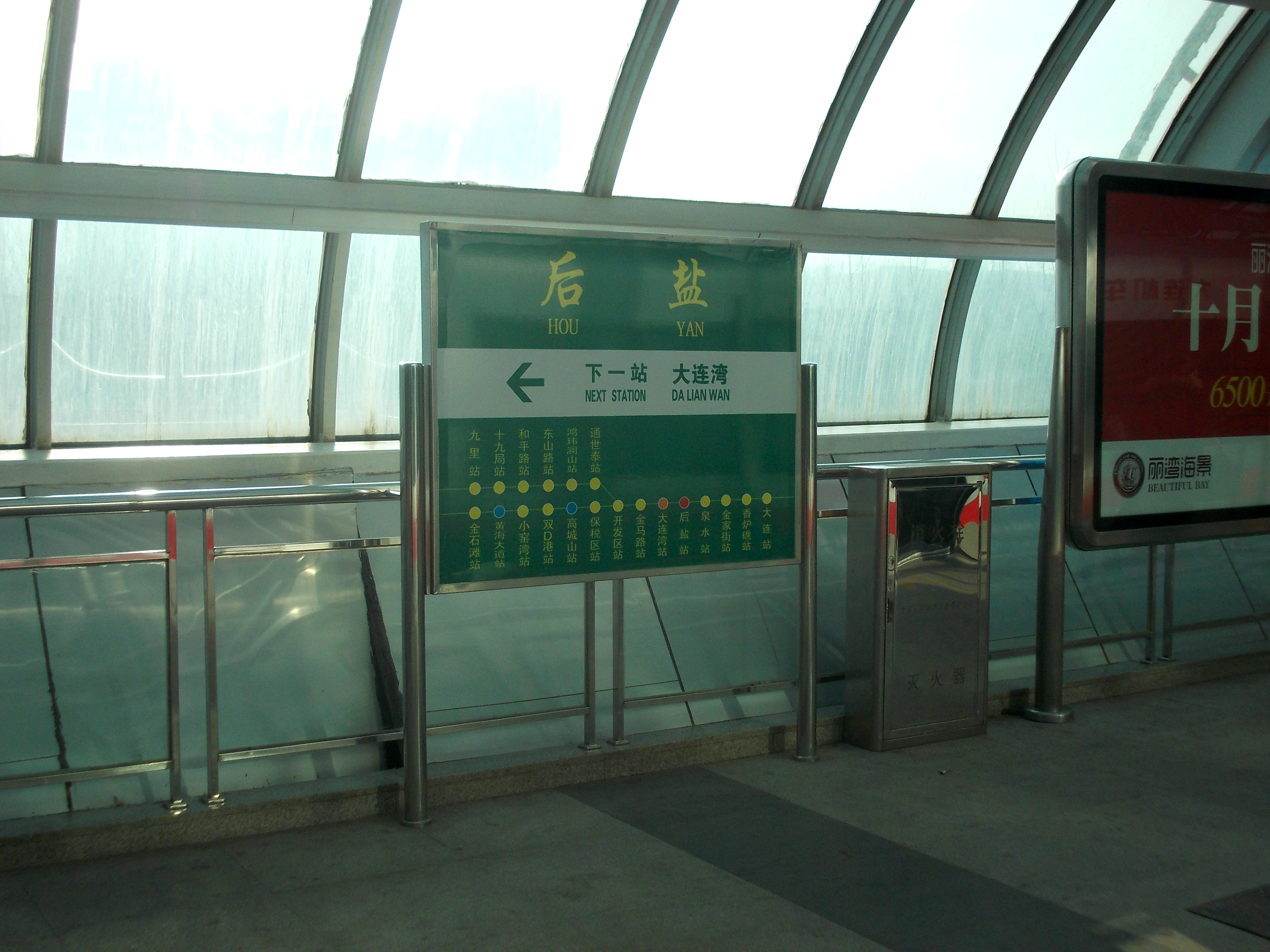

General information
- Location: Dalian, Liaoning; China
- Operated by: Dalian Public Transportation Group Co. Ltd.
- Lines: Line 3 Line 5

Services
Preceding station	Dalian Metro	Following station
Quanshui towards Dalian Railway Station	Line 3	Dalianwan towards Golden Pebble Beach
Longhua Road towards Hutan Xinqu	Line 5	Houguan Terminus
Location

Houyan is an interchange station on Line 3 and Line 5 of the Dalian Metro in Liaoning Province, China. It is located in the Ganjingzi District of Dalian City.
