= Dalianwan station =

Metro station in Dalian, China

Coordinates: 39°02′08″N 121°42′30″E

Dalianwan 大连湾 METRO
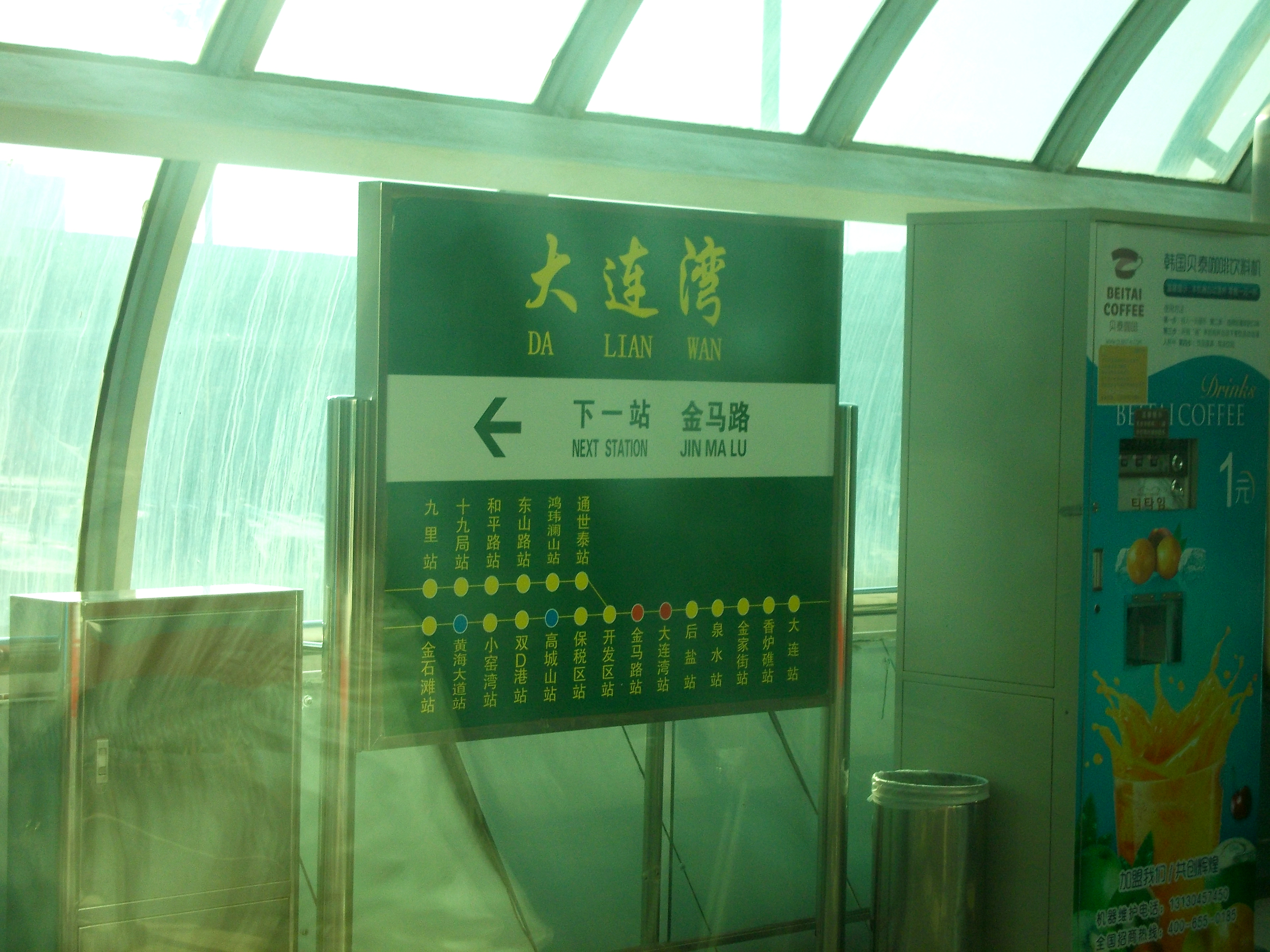

General information
- Location: Dalian, Liaoning; China
- Operated by: Dalian Public Transportation Group Co. Ltd.
- Line: Line 3

Services
Preceding station	Dalian Metro	Following station
Houyan towards Dalian Railway Station	Line 3	Jinma Road towards Golden Pebble Beach
Houyan towards Dalian Railway Station	Line 3	Jinma Road towards Jiuli
Location

Dalianwan is a station on Line 3 of the Dalian Metro in Liaoning Province, China. It is located in the Ganjingzi District of Dalian City.
