= Gebze Metro =

Rapid transit system under construction in Gebze, Turkey

Overview
- Native name: Gebze Metrosu
- Owner: Ministry of Transport and Infrastructure
- Locale: Gebze and Darıca, Turkey
- Transit type: Rapid transit
- Number of lines: 1
- Number of stations: 12
- Daily ridership: 4,800 (Projected)

Operation
- Began operation: March 2027

Technical
- System length: 15.4 km (9.6 mi)
- Track gauge: 1,435 mm (4 ft 8 1/2 in) (standard gauge)

The Gebze Metro (Turkish: Gebze Metrosu) is an under-construction rapid transit system in Gebze and Darıca, Turkey. The system consists of a single 15.4 km (9.6 mi) long line running north from Darıca to Gebze. The metro system will be the first network to exist outside of a provincial capital in Turkey, as Gebze and Darıca are located within the Kocaeli Province, whose capital is İzmit.

Construction began in late 2018, but the inauguration date has been delayed constantly. As of November 2026, the line is expected to open in March 2027.

== Network ==
Most of the metro line will be underground, except for a 900 m (3,000 ft) section which will be at-grade. The line will interchange with TCDD Taşımacılık high-speed and intercity trains along with Marmaray commuter trains to Istanbul at Gebze railway station. A maintenance facility and a control center will be constructed at Pelitli, in north Gebze. Journey time is expected to be 19 minutes and the projected daily ridership is expected to 4,800.

== History ==
Prequalification for the construction of the line was concluded by the Kocaeli Metropolitan Municipality on 1 February 2018. Construction was officially launched on 29 September 2018 by the municipality, however later in 2019 development of the line was transferred to the Ministry of Transport and Infrastructure due to cost overruns. In January 2021, Ankara-based rail vehicle manufacturer Bozankaya was awarded a contract for the supply of seven four-car trains to work the line. Tunneling work on the line, using tunnel boring machines, was started on 14 June 2021. The first trainset for the line was delivered on 1 September 2023.

== Incidents ==
On 29 October 2025, during the construction of the metro line, an apartment building collapsed above the Akse Sapağı metro station. Four people died in the incident, and it is suspected that the lack of safety measures in the construction caused the collapse. An investigation revealed that the lack of safeguards during the construction of the line was the contributing factor to the collapse.

== See also ==
- List of metro systems
