= Xigang, Dalian =

Xigang 西岗区
- District
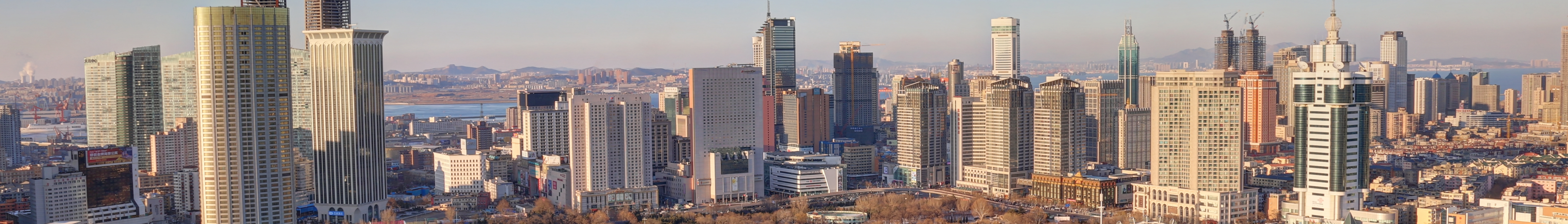

- Location in Liaoning
- Coordinates: 38°54′51″N 121°36′46″E
- Country: China
- Province: Liaoning
- Sub-provincial city: Dalian
- District seat: Renmin Square Subdistrict

Area
  - Total: 23.94 km^{2} (9.24 sq mi)

Population (2020 census)
  - Total: 305,317
  - Density: 12,750/km^{2} (33,030/sq mi)
- Time zone: UTC+8 (China Standard)
- Division code: 210203
- Website: www.dlxg.gov.cn

Xigang District (simplified Chinese: 西岗区; traditional Chinese: 西崗區; pinyin: Xīgǎng Qū) is one of the seven districts of Dalian, Liaoning province, China, forming part of the urban core. Its area is 23.94 square kilometres (9.24 sq mi) and its permanent population as of 2010 is 305,742, making it the smallest and second most densely populated of Dalian's county-level divisions The district government is located at 77 Beijing Street, and postal code is 116011.

== Administrative divisions ==
There are 5 subdistricts within the district:

- Xianglujiao Subdistrict (香炉礁街道)
- Rixin Subdistrict (日新街道)
- Beijing Subdistrict (北京街道)
- Bayi Road Subdistrict (八一路街道)
- Renmin Square Subdistrict (人民广场街道)
- Baiyun Subdistrict (白云街道)

== Education ==
The following secondary schools are within Xigang District:

- Dalian No. 1 High School
- Dalian No. 12 High School
- Dalian No. 34 Middle School
- Dalian No. 36 High School
- Dalian No. 37 Middle School
- High School Affiliated to Dalian College of Education
