= Ganjingzi, Dalian =

Ganjingzi 甘井子区
- District
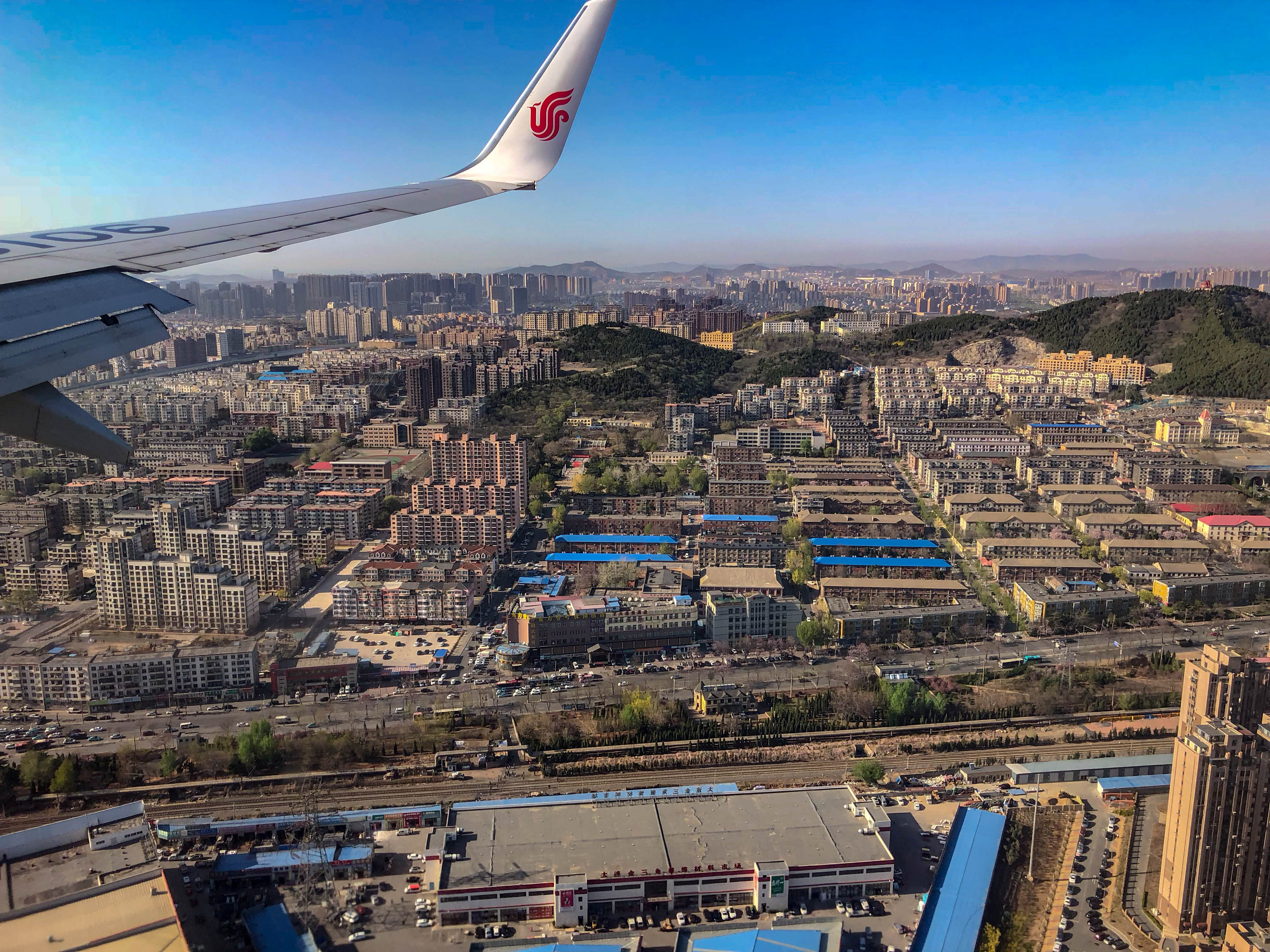

- Location in Liaoning
- Coordinates: 38°57′17″N 121°33′30″E
- Country: People's Republic of China
- Province: Liaoning
- Sub-provincial city: Dalian
- Seat: No. 1 Mingzhu Square (明珠广场1号)

Area
  - Total: 451.52 km^{2} (174.33 sq mi)

Population (2020)
  - Total: 1,798,458
  - Density: 3,983.1/km^{2} (10,316/sq mi)
- Time zone: UTC+8 (China Standard)
- Division code: GJZ
- Division code: 210211
- Website: www.dlgjz.gov.cn

Ganjingzi District (simplified Chinese: 甘井子区; traditional Chinese: 甘井子區; pinyin: Gānjǐngzi Qū) is one of the seven districts of Dalian, Liaoning province, People's Republic of China, forming part of the urban core. Its area is 451.52 square kilometres (174.33 sq mi) and its permanent population as of 2020 is 1,798,458 (making it Dalian's most populous county-level division) and postal code 116033.

== Administrative divisions ==
There are 15 subdistricts in the district.

Subdistricts:

- Zhoushuizi Subdistrict (周水子街道)
- Jiaojinshan Subdistrict (椒金山街道)
- Ganjingzi Subdistrict (甘井子街道)
- Nanguanling Subdistrict (南关岭街道)
- Paoai Subdistrict (泡崖街道)
- Zhonghua Road Subdistrict (中华路街道)
- Airport Subdistrict (机场街道)
- Xinzhaizi Subdistrict (辛寨子街道)
- Hongqi Subdistrict (红旗街道)
- Lingshui Subdistrict (凌水街道)
- Dalianwan Subdistrict (大连湾街道)
- Quanshui Subdistrict (泉水街道)
- Gezhenpu Subdistrict (革镇堡街道)
- Yingchengzi Subdistrict (Yingchengtze) (营城子街道)
- Qixianling Subdistrict (七贤岭街道)

== Education ==
The following secondary schools are within Ganjingzi District:

- Dalian No. 11 High School
- Dalian No. 20 High School
- Dalian No. 23 High School
- Dalian No. 76 Middle School
- Dalian No. 80 Middle School
- High School Attached to Dalian University of Technology
- Dalian Hongqi Senior High School
- Dalian Yuwen Middle School

The following universities are within Ganjingzi District:

- Dalian University of Technology
- Dalian Maritime University
- Dalian Polytechnic University
- Dalian Neusoft University of Information
- Liaoning Police College
