= Z117/118 Beijing–Jilin through train =

Chinese railway between Beijing and Jilin City

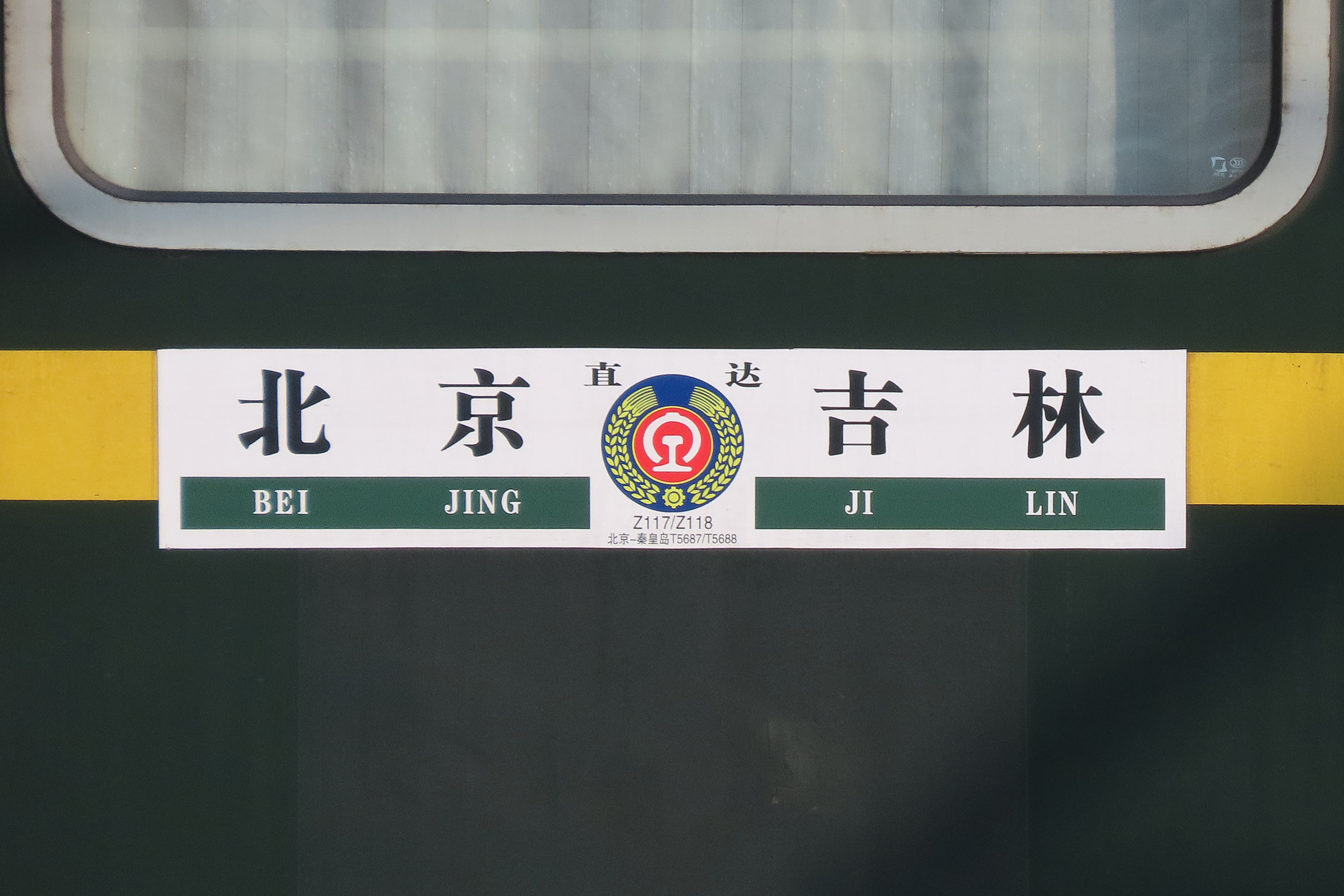
The information board of this train

The Z117/118 Beijing–Jilin through train (Chinese: Z117/118次北京到吉林直达特快列车) is a Chinese railway running between the capital Beijing to Jilin City express passenger trains by the Shenyang Railway Bureau, Jilin passenger segment responsible for passenger transport task, JIlin originating on the Beijing train. 25T Type Passenger trains running along the Jingha Railway and Changtu Railway across Jilin, Liaoning, Hebei, Tianjin, Beijing and other provinces and cities, the entire 1131 km. Beijing railway station to Jilin railway station running 14 hours and 9 minutes, use trips for Z117; Jilin railway station to Beijing railway station to run 12 hours and 17 minutes, use trips for Z118.

== Carriages ==
Carriage number	1	2－12	13－14	15	16－18
Type of carriages	XL25T; Baggage car (Chinese: 行李车)	YW25T; Hard sleeper (Chinese: 硬卧车)	RW25T; Soft sleeper (Chinese: 软卧车)	CA25T; Dining car (Chinese: 餐车)	YZ25T; Hard seat (Chinese: 硬座车)

== Locomotives ==
Sections	Beijing－Changchun	Changchun－Jilin
Locomotives and their allocation	SS9 electric locomotive Shenyang Railway Bureau Shenyang Depot (Chinese: 沈局沈段)	DF11G diesel locomotive Shenyang Railway Bureau Jilin Depot (Chinese: 沈局吉段)

=== Timetable ===
Z117		Stops	Z118	
Arrive	Depart	Stops	Arrive	Depart
—	16:55	Beijing	09:52	—
18:38	18:41	Tangshan North	↑	↑
19:32	19:41	Changli	↑	↑
20:14	20:17	Qinhuangdao	↑	↑
21:45	21:58	Suizhong North	↑	↑
↓	↓	Jinzhou South	04:44	04:55
01:30	01:38	Shenyang North	02:34	02:42
02:17	02:19	Tieling	01:54	01:56
03:29	03:32	Siping	↑	↑
04:35	04:54	Changchun	23:13	23:55
05:48	05:54	Jiutai	22:29	22:35
07:04	—	Jilin	—	21:35

== See also ==
- D73/74 Beijing-Jilin Through Train
- G383/384 Beijing-Jilin Through Train
