= List of top class stations of China Railway =

This is a list of top class stations of China Railway.

Name	Type	Operator	City	Image
Harbin	Passenger and freight	CR Harbin	Harbin	
Qiqihar	Passenger and freight	CR Harbin	Qiqihar	
Jiamusi	Passenger and freight	CR Harbin	Jiamusi	
Mudanjiang	Passenger, freight and classification yard	CR Harbin	Mudanjiang	
Shenyang	Passenger and freight	CR Shenyang	Shenyang	
Yuguo	Freight and classification yard	CR Shenyang	Shenyang	
Shenyang North	Passenger and freight	CR Shenyang	Shenyang	
Shenyang South	Passenger	CR Shenyang	Shenyang	
Sujiatun	Passenger, freight and classification yard	CR Shenyang	Shenyang	
Changchun	Passenger and freight	CR Shenyang	Changchun	
Shanhaiguan	Passenger, freight and classification yard	CR Shenyang	Qinhuangdao	
Beijing	Passenger and freight	CR Beijing	Beijing	
Beijing West	Passenger	CR Beijing	Beijing	
Beijing South	Passenger	CR Beijing	Beijing	
Fengtai	Passenger and freight	CR Beijing	Beijing	
Fengtai West	Freight and classification yard	CR Beijing	Beijing	
Tianjin	Passenger and freight	CR Beijing	Tianjin	
Nancang	Freight and classification yard	CR Beijing	Tianjin	
Shijiazhuang	Passenger and freight	CR Beijing	Shijiazhuang	
Taiyuan	Passenger and freight	CR Taiyuan	Taiyuan	
Datong	Passenger, freight and classification yard	CR Taiyuan	Datong	
Zhengzhou	Passenger	CR Zhengzhou	Zhengzhou	
Zhengzhou North	Freight and classification yard	CR Zhengzhou	Zhengzhou	
Zhengzhou East	Passenger	CR Zhengzhou	Zhengzhou	
Putian West	Freight	CR Zhengzhou	Zhengzhou	
Luoyang Longmen	Passenger	CR Zhengzhou	Luoyang	
Hankou	Passenger	CR Wuhan	Wuhan	
Wuchang	Passenger and freight	CR Wuhan	Wuhan	
Wuhan	Passenger	CR Wuhan	Wuhan	
Wuhan North	Freight and classification yard	CR Wuhan	Wuhan	
Xiangyang North	Freight and classification yard	CR Wuhan	Xiangyang	
Xi'an	Passenger	CR Xi'an	Xi'an	
Xi'an North	Passenger	CR Xi'an	Xi'an	
Lianhu (ex-Xi'an West)	Freight	CR Xi'an	Xi'an	
Xinfengzhen	Freight and classification yard	CR Xi'an	Xi'an	
Jinan	Passenger and freight	CR Jinan	Jinan	
Jixi（Chinese:济西）	Freight and classification yard	CR Jinan	Jinan	
Jinan West	Passenger	CR Jinan	Jinan	
Qingdao	Passenger and freight	CR Jinan	Qingdao	
Shanghai	Passenger and freight	CR Shanghai	Shanghai	
Shanghai Hongqiao	Passenger	CR Shanghai	Shanghai	
Nanxiang	Freight and classification yard	CR Shanghai	Shanghai	
Beijiao（Chinese:北郊）	Freight	CR Shanghai	Shanghai	
Nanjing South	Passenger	CR Shanghai	Nanjing	
Nanjing East	Freight and classification yard	CR Shanghai	Nanjing	
Wuxi	Passenger and freight	CR Shanghai	Wuxi	
Changzhou	Passenger and freight	CR Shanghai	Changzhou	
Hangzhou East	Passenger	CR Shanghai	Hangzhou	
Hefei South	Passenger	CR Shanghai	Hefei	
Xiangtang West	Freight and classification yard	CR Nanchang	Nanchang	
Yingtan	Passenger, freight and classification yard	CR Nanchang	Yingtan	
Guangzhou	Passenger and freight	CR Guangzhou	Guangzhou	
Guangzhou South	Passenger	CR Guangzhou	Guangzhou	
Jiangcun	Freight and classification yard	CR Guangzhou	Guangzhou	
Shenzhen North	Passenger	CR Guangzhou	Shenzhen	
Changsha South	Passenger	CR Guangzhou	Changsha	
Zhuzhou	Passenger	CR Guangzhou	Zhuzhou	
Zhuzhou North	Freight and classification yard	CR Guangzhou	Zhuzhou	
Hengyang	Passenger and freight	CR Guangzhou	Hengyang	
Hengyang North	Freight and classification yard	CR Guangzhou	Hengyang	
Huaihua	Passenger and freight	CR Guangzhou	Huaihua	
Huaihua South	Passenger	CR Guangzhou	Huaihua	
Nanning	Passenger and freight	CR Nanning	Nanning	
Guilin North	Passenger	CR Nanning	Guilin	
Liuzhou South	Classification yard	CR Nanning	Liuzhou	
Chengdu	Passenger and freight	CR Chengdu	Chengdu	
Chengdu North	Freight and classification yard	CR Chengdu	Chengdu	
Chengdu East	Passenger	CR Chengdu	Chengdu	
Chongqing North	Passenger	CR Chengdu	Chongqing	
Guiyang South	Freight and classification yard	CR Chengdu	Guiyang	
Guiyang North	Passenger	CR Chengdu	Guiyang	
Kunming South	Passenger	CR Kunming	Kunming	
Kunming East	Freight and classification yard	CR Kunming	Kunming	
Lanzhou West	Passenger and freight	CR Lanzhou	Lanzhou	
