= Huanggutun railway station =

Railway station in Shenyang, China

Huanggutun 皇姑屯站
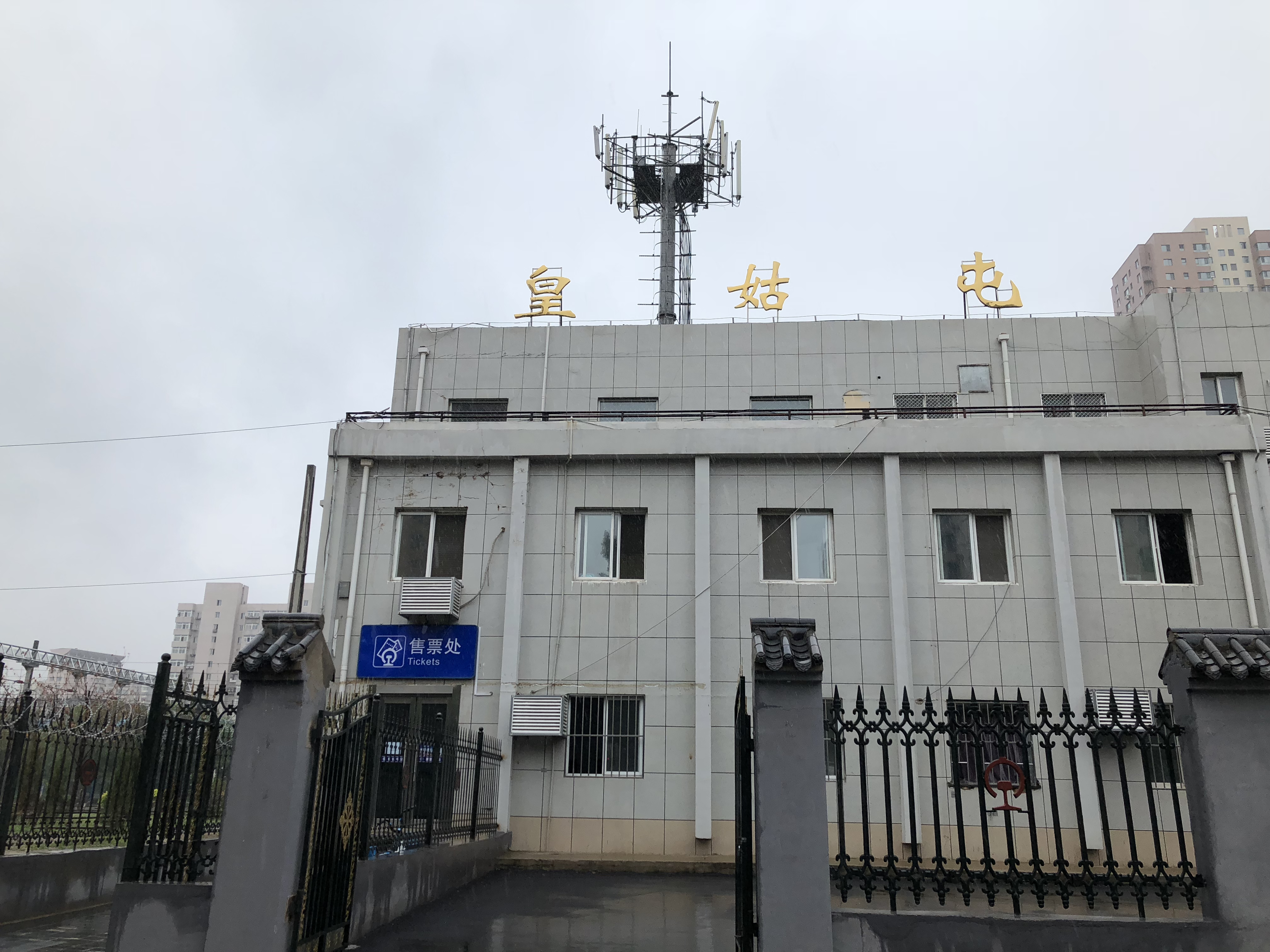
- View of Huanggutun Railway Station taken in 2018

General information
- Location: Shenhe District, Shenyang, Liaoning; China
- Coordinates: 41°48′37″N 123°23′27″E
- Operated by: China Railway High-speed, China Railway Corporation
- Line: Qinhuangdao–Shenyang

History
- Closed: 2012 (passenger); 2017 (freight)
Location

Huanggutun railway station was a railway station on the Qinhuangdao–Shenyang High-Speed Railway. It was located in Shenyang, in the Liaoning province of China. It closed to passenger service in 2012, and closed to freight in 2017 during construction of the Beijing–Shenyang high-speed railway.

== See also ==
- Huanggutunzhan station, on Line 9 (Shenyang Metro)
- Huanggutun incident in 1928, near the station

Preceding station	China Railway High-speed	Following station
Liaozhong towards Qinhuangdao	Qinhuangdao–Shenyang high-speed railway Part of the Beijing–Harbin Railway	Shenyang North towards Shenyang
