= Qinhuangdao–Shenyang passenger railway =

Railway line in China

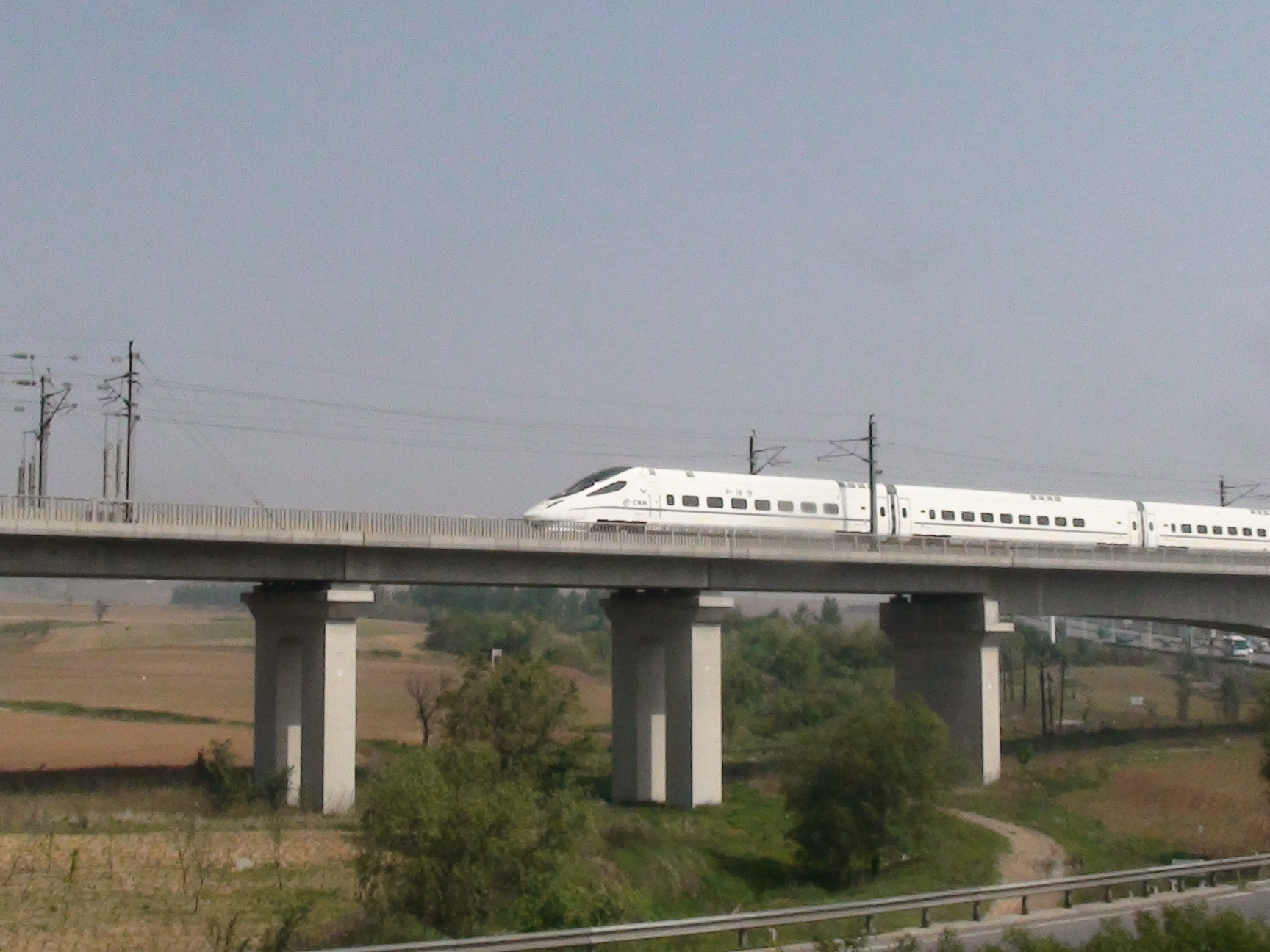
- A China Railways CRH5 train on the Qinshen PDL

Overview
- Other name: Qinshen railway
- Native name: 秦沈客运专线
- Owner: CR Beijing; CR Shenyang
- Locale: Hebei province; Liaoning province

Service
- Type: High-speed rail
- System: China Railway High-speed
- Operators: CR Beijing; CR Shenyang

History
- Opened: October 12, 2003

Technical
- Line length: 404 km (251 mi)
- Number of tracks: 2 (Double-track)
- Track gauge: 1,435 mm (4 ft 8 1/2 in) standard gauge
- Electrification: 25 kV 50 Hz AC (Overhead line)
- Operating speed: 250 km/h (160 mph) (maximum)
- Maximum incline: 1.2%

Qinhuangdao–Shenyang passenger railway or Qinshen railway (simplified Chinese: 秦沈客运专线; traditional Chinese: 秦瀋客運專線; pinyin: Qínshěn Kèyùn Zhuānxiàn) is a passenger-dedicated high-speed railway between Qinhuangdao, Hebei province and Shenyang, Liaoning province of China, spanning a distance of 404 km (251 mi). Construction started on August 16, 1999. Formally opened on October 12, 2003, it is the first newly built high-speed railway in China, costing CN¥15.7 billion (US$1.9 billion). It is an electrified dual-track railway designed for a top speed of 200 km/h (120 mph). By 2007 its top speed was increased to 250 km/h (160 mph). In 2002, high-speed train China Star achieved a top speed of 321 km/h (199 mph) on Qinshen railway, setting a record for Chinese train speed. Currently, most of the passenger trains between Qinhuangdao to Shenyang are diverted to this railway from Shenshan railway.

== History ==
=== Background ===
The century-old Shenshan railway was the first to link Northeast China with the rest of the country, and handled the busy freight and passenger traffic. After the Reform and opening up period, there was much development along the line, resulting in the line slowly reaching capacity; in order to fulfil demand to Northeast China, from 1997-2001, the number of passenger trains on the line increased and the number of freight trains was consequently reduced. (Note: The Shanhaiguan-Jinzhou section had 45 pairs of passenger and 62 pairs of freight trains daily in 1997, and had 52 passenger and 55 freight trains daily in 2001. The Jinzhou-Shenyang North section had 46 pairs of passenger and 58.5 pairs of freight trains in 1997 and 53 pairs of passenger and 49 pairs of freight trains in 2001.) The line was double-tracked and fitted with automatic block signalling during the Speed-Up Campaign to increase capacity, but as an existing railway, further upgrades would require modification to the rails, tunnels, bridges, curves etc., which would limit capacity and speed further.

According to calculations in 2003, for passengers travelling between Shenyang and Shanhaiguan, 85% of these passengers only travelled through this section, rather than getting off at a city along the line. At the time, such a figure for the entire Chinese railway network was only 24%. As a result, building a new railway to increase capacity was required. In addition, the rapid rise in air and road transportation was slowly eating away at the market for rail travel. In the 90s, as the average speed of Chinese trains was only 50 km/h, and frequently encountered delays, travellers turned to the much faster airlines or the more convenient highways. In order to turn around the downward trend, the Ministry of Railways proposed the Speed-Up Campaign to reduce travelling times.

To relieve the existing mainline between Shenyang and Shanhaiguan, and as part of the Speed-Up Campaign, the Ministry of Railways planned a new passenger-dedicated line; after the completion of this new line, the existing mainline would mainly handle freight trains, while the new line would handle passenger trains and high-speed trains.

=== Planning ===
Planning for the Qinhuangdao-Shenyang passenger railway began in 1986 with the Chinese Railway Design Corporation participating in preliminary research. The project involved 371 km of new railway, 20 km of upgrades to the existing line between Qinhuangdao and Shanhaiguan, and 14 km of line in the Shenyang junction. 12 stations were planned, of which Shenyang North, Huanggutun, Shanhaiguan and Qinhuangdao would be renovated existing stations, while Suizhong North, Huludao North, Jinzhou South, Panjin North, Tai'an, and Liaozhong would be newly built. The average station spacing was 60 km with an estimated capacity of 100 pairs of trains per day. After opening, trains with an operating speed of 200 km/h, 160 km/h and 140 km/h would operate on the new line, while trains with an operating speed of 120 km/h and freight trains would operate on the old Shenshan railway.

The entire project was designed by China Railway Design Corporation and constructed by the Engineering Management Center of the Ministry of Railways.

==== The beginnings of Chinese HSR ====
At the time, high-speed rail in China was still in a demonstration phase. During the debate, the Ministry of Railways advocated for a conventional wheel-rail solution, while the Ministry of Science and Technology, some scientists, and then-Premier Zhu Rongji proposed adopting Maglev technology. As China had not yet established standards for high-speed rail, when the Ministry sought approval for the line from the NDRC, the term "high-speed rail" was not used, but rather "passenger dedicated line".

During the planning phase, the line faced three options for its design speed: 160 km/h, 200 km/h, and 250 km/h, and the choice between a mixed passenger-freight railway or a passenger-dedicated line. After planning of the China high-speed rail grid and comparing costs, the line was finally confirmed as a passenger-dedicated line with a design speed of 200 km/h. As China's first high-speed railway (Note: According to the International Union of Railways (UIC) definition, high-speed rail requires a speed of 200 km/h (for upgraded existing lines) or 250 km/h (for new lines). At that time, China did not have its own HSR standards, so the UIC standard is referenced here.), the initial operating speed of the line was 160 km/h. There were plans to increase the speed to 200 km/h shortly after opening, while reserving conditions for further speed increases. The Shanhaiguan–Suizhong North section had a design speed reaching 300 km/h.

Given these construction requirements, the line had strict specifications for the track, bridges, and tunnels. This was to ensure that passengers on trains traveling at 200 km/h would enjoy the same comfort level as those on ordinary trains. Because the geographical conditions along the line were favorable and the population density was low, the minimum curve radius of the line reached 3.5 km. Considering that increasing the speed to 250 km/h was a long-term plan, and that the roadbed settlement would stabilize by then, the bridges and roadbeds were designed according to 200 km/h requirements. The specific standards were: a settlement rate of no more than 4 cm/year, a final settlement in general sections of no more than 15 cm, and no more than 8 cm at the abutment tail. Furthermore, "bridge-head jumping" (Note: A momentary bump that occurs when a vehicle passes over the bridge head.) was not permitted, and the elastic deformation of the roadbed when a train passed had to be controlled between 3.5 and 4 mm. In comparison, China's first "trial" of high-speed rail, the Guangshen railway in the 1980s, experienced 50 cm of settlement in some sections in less than 20 years.

The line also used 377.23 km of one-time laid, 60 kg/m continuous welded rail, with the longest single section measuring 201 km. The line adopted the No. 38 Railroad switch, which had the largest turnout number (the larger the number, the smaller the diverging angle) at the time. This turnout allowed a passing speed of 250 km/h and a diverging speed of 140 km/h.

Additionally, because drivers cannot clearly see roadside objects at speeds of 200 km/h, the line did not install any roadside railway signals. Instead, it used a train control system combining cab signalling and automatic block signaling. Communication was handled via an onboard wireless digital signal telephone system developed by Hitachi Rail STS, and dispatch orders were printed via an onboard fax machine.

=== Construction ===
The line broke ground on 16 August 1999 at Shanhaiguan railway station and was formally completed on 31 December 2002. A total of 30 bureau-level construction units from the railway system participated in the construction (Note: Including the 1st Bureau, 2nd Bureau, 3rd Bureau, 4th Bureau, 5th Bureau, 11th Bureau, 12th Bureau, 13th Bureau, 14th Bureau, 16th Bureau, 18th Bureau, 19th Bureau, Electrification Bureau, and Major Bridge Bureau.). The total construction cost of the line was 16.12 billion yuan, averaging 39.84 million yuan per kilometer.

The terrain and geological conditions in the construction area were generally favorable. Except for the section between Qinhuangdao and Linghai, which consists of hills interspersed with plains and occasional sand dunes, the majority of the route traverses plains. Despite this, most of the participating construction units were building a passenger-dedicated line with such strict technical, process, and regulatory standards for the first time, and lacked experience. To ensure strict adherence to standards, construction units invested heavily to guarantee mechanization, scalability, and standardization. They also established a responsibility tracking system for engineering quality, even installing nameplates on completed bridges and culverts listing the construction units and personnel responsible. To control roadbed settlement and ensure track smoothness, the roadbed density exceeds that of ordinary railways by 10%. Additionally, transition sections were laid between foundations of varying stiffness.

The track-laying process incorporated international standards advanced for the time. Construction teams developed a complete set of track-laying equipment (Note: Including a tractor, track-laying vehicle, self-propelled gantry crane for sleeper transfer, specialized flatbed transport vehicle, and on-site rail flash-butt welding vehicle.), which, combined with long-distance rail welding technology, allowed for the continuous laying of sleepers. Track laying for the entire line was completed on June 16, 2002. To ensure operational safety, bridges comprise 20% of the total length. Furthermore, 2-meter-high iron fences were installed along both sides of the entire route (unlike later passenger-dedicated lines, which typically used concrete barriers, the line mostly used metal fencing due to its earlier construction).

On August 20, 2002, the overhead line on the Shanhaiguan–Suizhong North section was energised, enabling subsequent high-speed train tests. On November 10, the electrification of the entire line was completed. Four days later, a "cold run" (Note: Refers to a test run where a train travels through a designated section using other power sources while the catenary is de-energized, in order to check if non-electric facilities meet operational requirements.) was conducted on the whole line.

During construction, Cai Qinghua, then Vice Minister of Railways, inspected the construction sites in western Liaoning three times. Wang Zhenhou, then General Manager of China Railway Construction Corporation (CRCC), attended work meetings on three occasions, while Li Guorui, then Party Secretary of the company, visited nearly every construction site along the line.

=== Testing ===
To ensure the successful application of new technologies, the Ministry of Railways established a 66.8 km test section with a design speed of 300 km/h between Shanhaiguan and Suizhong North. Construction began in August 1999 and was completed in December 2001. Subsequently, the Ministry of Railways conducted several experiments on this section:

Experiments on the 300 km/h test section
No.	Date	Train Used	Top Speed (km/h)
1	December 2001	China Railway NZJ2	210
2	September 5–15, 2002	China Railway DJF2	292
3	December 15, 2002	China Railway DJJ2	321.5

After the completion of the three experiments, a full-line through-run experiment was conducted between Shenyang North and Shanhaiguan at speeds of 200–250 km/h. During the experiments, technicians also applied the Nucars software (Note: Official website:) developed by the Association of American Railroads to monitor track and train data. The results of the experiments showed that the curve alignment design of the line was reasonable and its safety performance was on par with the Shinkansen, although its dynamic performance was slightly inferior in comparison.

=== Unification ===
From 31st December 2006, the Qinshen passenger railway and Jingqin railway, as well as the Harbin-Shenyang section of the Hada railway was combined to form the Jingha railway, such that the Qinshen passenger railway now forms as the Qinhuangdao-Shenyang section of the Jingha railway.

== Operation ==
On October 11, 2003, the line officially opened. The first trains from the Beijing Bureau and Shenyang Bureau departed on the 11th and 12th, respectively. In the initial period, the two railway bureaus operated a total of 26 train numbers. The Beijing Bureau operated 4 pairs of limited express trains and 2 pairs of express trains (Note: Train numbers: T93, T94, T237, T238, T121, T122, T271, T272, K95, K96, K265, K266.), while the Shenyang Bureau operated 4 pairs of limited express and 3 pairs of express trains (Note: Train numbers: T17, T18, T47, T48, T71, T72, T59, T60, K127, K128, K309, K310, K53, K54.). During the initial operation, the line did not run at its design speed but continued to operate according to the schedule of the original Shenshan Railway, and fares were calculated based on Shenshan Railway prices. This was because the railway department worried that passengers could not accept fare increases. Additionally, the line's construction cost was not high, and the passenger flow between Northeast China and the rest of China was high, such that the ticket prices were sufficient to recoup costs.

The trains first put into formal operation on this line were the most advanced at the time. The locomotives were China Railways SS9, capable of reaching 170 km/h, suitable for hauling high-speed, multi-carriage passenger trains on main lines. The passenger carriages used were China Railways 25K rolling stock, capable of speeds up to 160 km/h. The EMUs initially put into operation were the "Pioneer" and "China Star". The first batch of 70 drivers operating Beijing-bound trains on this line were strictly selected, trained, and assessed from over 1,000 drivers at the Shenyang Locomotive Depot.

== Accidents and incidents ==
On November 17, 2005, train K27 from Beijing to Dandong was traveling between Jinzhou South and Panjin North. The fuel furnace room in the air-conditioning generator car (positioned second behind the locomotive) caught fire. After fire extinguishers failed, the chief conductor used the emergency brake valve to stop the train. The fire burned and snapped the contact wire of the overhead line (spans 759–761) on the downline, and damaged the messenger wires and other contact wires. One carriage was destroyed, but there were no casualties. The section reopened at 05:10 that day, after traffic on the downline was interrupted for 4 hours and 20 minutes. It was classified as a major passenger train fire accident. The cause was the generator car crew's failure to inspect equipment properly, leading to an untreated leak in the fuel pipe of the generator car's fuel furnace.

== Impact ==
In previous Chinese railway planning, lines were generally designed for mixed passenger and freight traffic. The line was the first railway dedicated solely to passenger transport, setting a precedent in Chinese railway construction. Subsequently, the focus of construction gradually shifted from upgrading existing lines to building new high-speed lines. The opening of the line greatly relieved the transportation strain on the Shenshan Railway and laid the foundation for the layout of the future Chinese high-speed rail grid. Together with the upgraded Jingqin Railway, it formed the Beijing–Qinhuangdao–Shenyang Passenger Corridor, promoting the arrival of the Fifth Railway Speed-Up and the launch of Beijing–Harbin CRH trains. It also facilitated the formation of the Coastal corridor.

At a time when the average speed of Chinese railways had just been raised to 60 km/h, the line reached speeds of 160 km/h. Consequently, the line's speed was dubbed the "Century Speed-Up," and the line itself was called the "Infant of the Century" of Chinese railways. As China's first passenger-dedicated line, it served as a test base for high-speed rail technology and equipment. Many new technologies and standards adopted during construction, such as transition sections between foundations of different stiffness, high-number turnouts, and new signaling systems, accumulated valuable experience for high-speed railways built later across China. Based on the design experience of the line, the design units for the Beijing–Shanghai High-Speed Railway formulated the "Interim Provisions for the Design of Beijing–Shanghai High-Speed Railway." These experiences were later applied to the design and construction of the Beijing–Tianjin Intercity Railway, Zhengzhou–Xi'an High-Speed Railway, and Wuhan–Guangzhou High-Speed Railway.
