= Tai'an railway station (Liaoning) =

Railway station in Anshan, Liaoning, China

Tai'an 台安
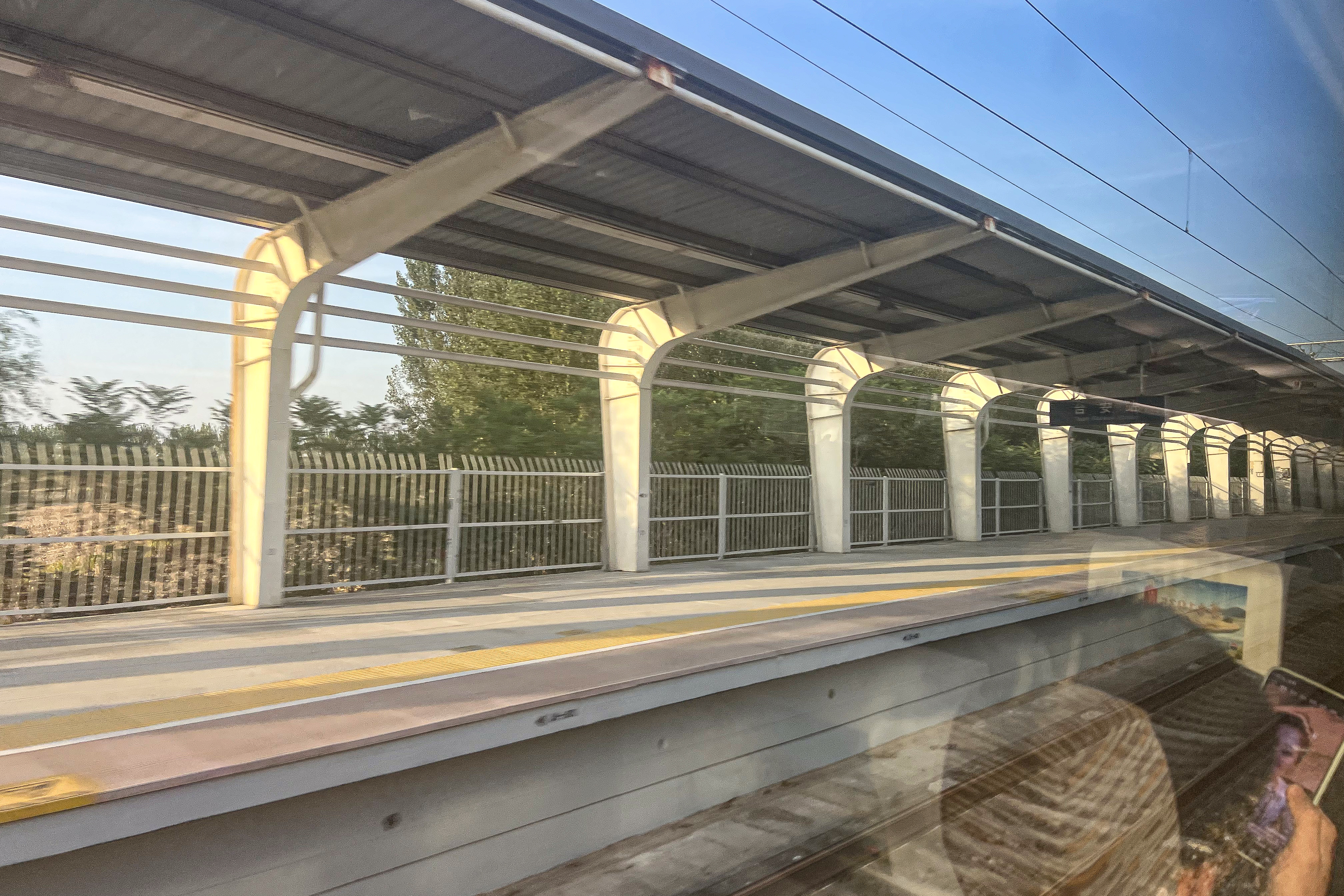

General information
- Location: Tai'an County, Anshan, Liaoning; China
- Coordinates: 36.1829147°N 117.054648°E
- Line: Qinhuangdao–Shenyang high-speed railway
Location

The Tai'an railway station (Chinese: 台安站) is a railway station of Qinhuangdao–Shenyang high-speed railway located in Tai'an County, Anshan, Liaoning, China.

Preceding station	China Railway High-speed	Following station
Panjin North towards Qinhuangdao	Qinhuangdao–Shenyang high-speed railway	Liaozhong towards Shenyang
