= D73/74 Beijing–Jilin through train =

Railway line in China

The D73/74 Beijing–Jilin through train (Chinese: D73/74次北京到吉林动车组列车) is a railway running between Beijing and Jilin City. It carries express passenger trains for the Shenyang Railway Bureau. The Jilin passenger segment is responsible for passenger transport. CRH5 Type Passenger trains run along the Jingha Railway, Harbin–Dalian High-Speed Railway and Changchun–Jilin Intercity Railway across Jilin, Liaoning, Hebei, Tianjin, Beijing and other areas. The route spans 1248 km. Beijing railway station to Jilin railway station requires 7 hours and 5 minutes. Jilin railway station to Beijing railway station runs 7 hours and 21 minutes.

== See also ==
- Z117/118 Beijing-Jilin Through Train
- G383/384 Beijing-Jilin Through Train
