= Panjin North railway station =

Railway station in Liaoning, China

Panjinbei 盘锦北
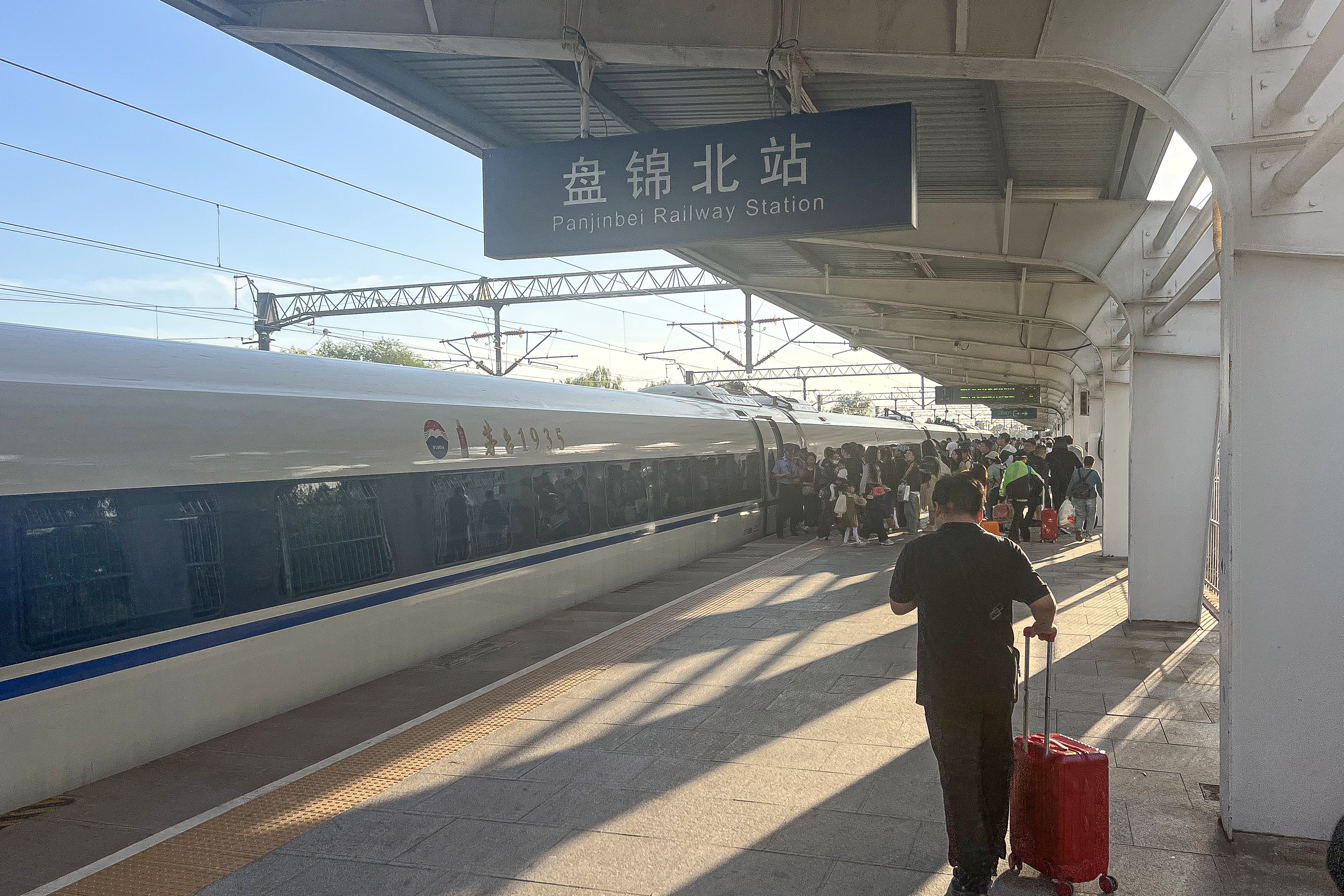
- Platform 1

General information
- Location: Tianshui Town, Panshan County, Panjin, Liaoning; China
Location

Panjin North railway station (盘锦北站) is a significant rail hub located in Tianshui Township, Panshan County, Panjin City, Liaoning Province, China. It serves as an interchange for both the Qinhuangdao–Shenyang high-speed railway and the Panjin–Yingkou high-speed railway.

The station was constructed in 2003 and commenced operations on April 18, 2004. Due to initial limitations in facilities and accessibility, a significant renovation was undertaken in June 2008. The upgraded station, featuring modern amenities, reopened on December 23, 2008, solidifying its role as a crucial transportation hub in the region.

== Station Overview ==
Name: Panjin North railway station

Chinese Name: 盘锦北站

Location: Tianshui Township, Panshan County, Panjin, Liaoning, China

Coordinates: 41°20′2″N, 121°48′0″E

Operator: China Railway Shenyang Group

Station Code: 52114

Classification: Second-class station

Platforms and Tracks: 2 platforms, 4 tracks

Opening Date: April 18, 2004

| Preceding station | China Railway High-speed | Following station |
|---|---|---|
| Jinzhou South towards Qinhuangdao | Qinhuangdao–Shenyang high-speed railway | Tai'an towards Shenyang |
| Terminus | Panjin–Yingkou high-speed railway | Panjin towards Yingkou East or Haicheng West |
