= Suizhong North railway station =

Railway station in Huludao, Liaoning, China

Coordinates: 40°20′50.59″N 120°19′6.49″E

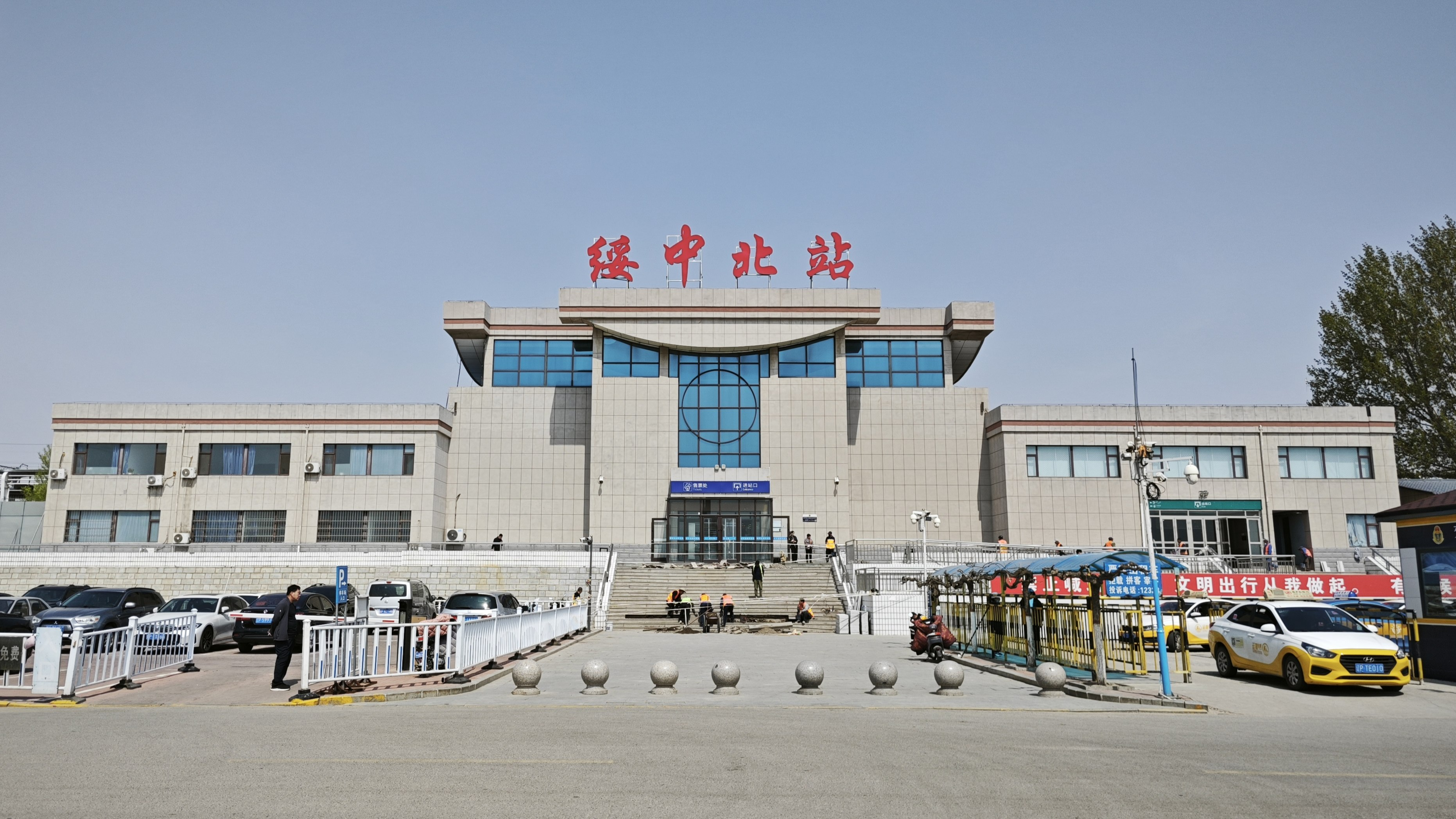
Suizhong North railway station

Suizhong North railway station (simplified Chinese: 绥中北站; traditional Chinese: 綏中北站) is a railway station of Qinhuangdao–Shenyang high-speed railway, located in Suizhong County, Huludao, Liaoning Province, China.

Preceding station	China Railway High-speed	Following station
Dongdaihe towards Qinhuangdao	Qinhuangdao–Shenyang high-speed railway	Xingcheng West towards Shenyang
