= Shanhai Pass =

Gateway in the Great Wall of China

Shanhai Guan
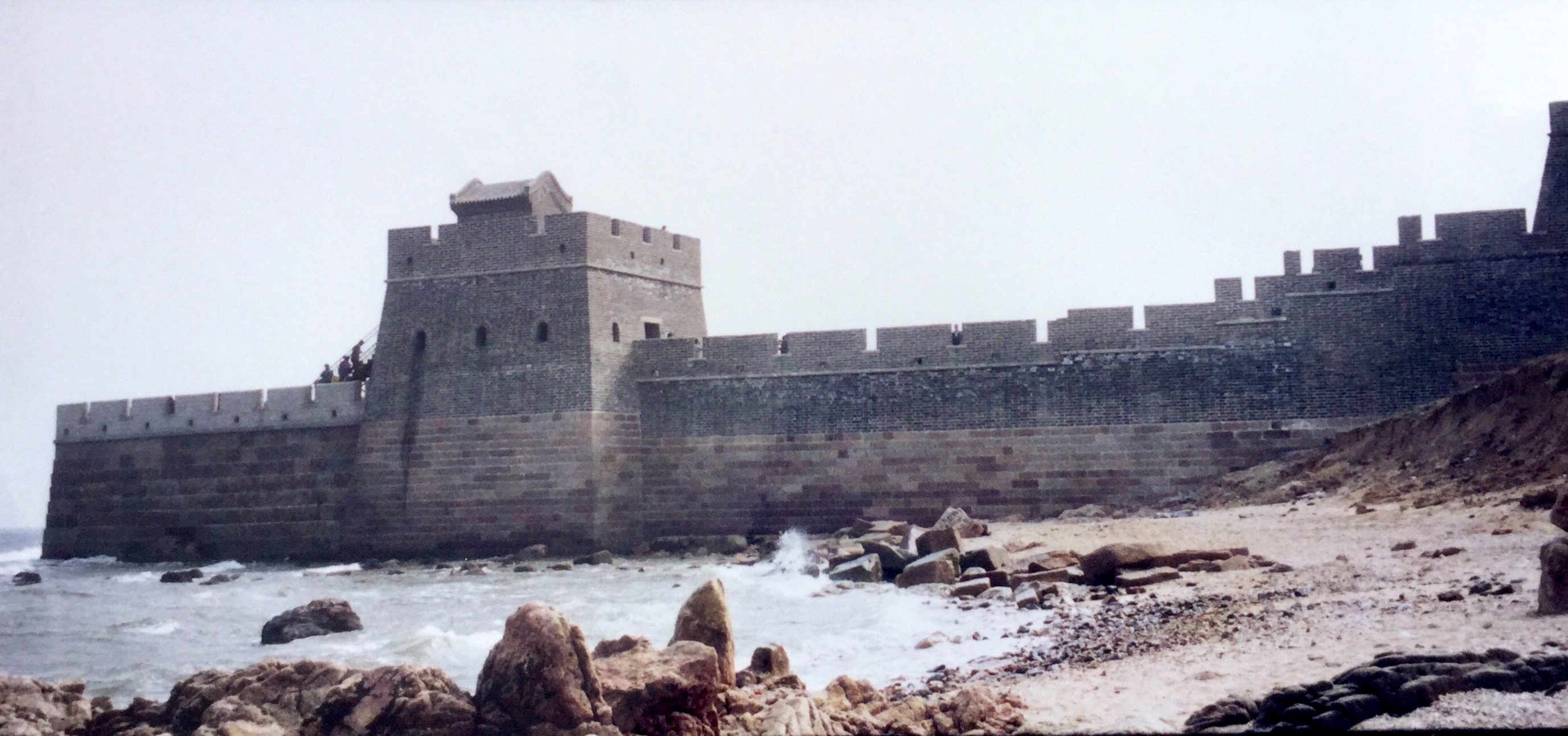
- Old Dragon's Head (老龙头), part of Shanhai Pass, is where the Great Wall meets the Bohai Sea

- Location within China
- Traversed by: Beijing–Harbin railway, G102

Location
- Location: Shanhaiguan District, Qinhuangdao, Hebei, China
- Coordinates: 40°00′34″N 119°45′15″E

Shanhai Pass

Chinese name
- Simplified Chinese: 山海关
- Traditional Chinese: 山海關
- Literal meaning: "Mountain and Sea Pass"
Transcriptions
Standard Mandarin
- Hanyu Pinyin: Shānhǎi Guān
- Wade–Giles: Shan Hai Kuan
Yue: Cantonese
- Jyutping: saan^{1} hoi^{2} gwaan^{1}

Manchu name
- Manchu script: ᡧᠠᠨᠠᡥᠠ ᡶᡠᡵᡩᠠᠨ
- Romanization: šanaha furdan

Location of Shanhai Pass in Hebei

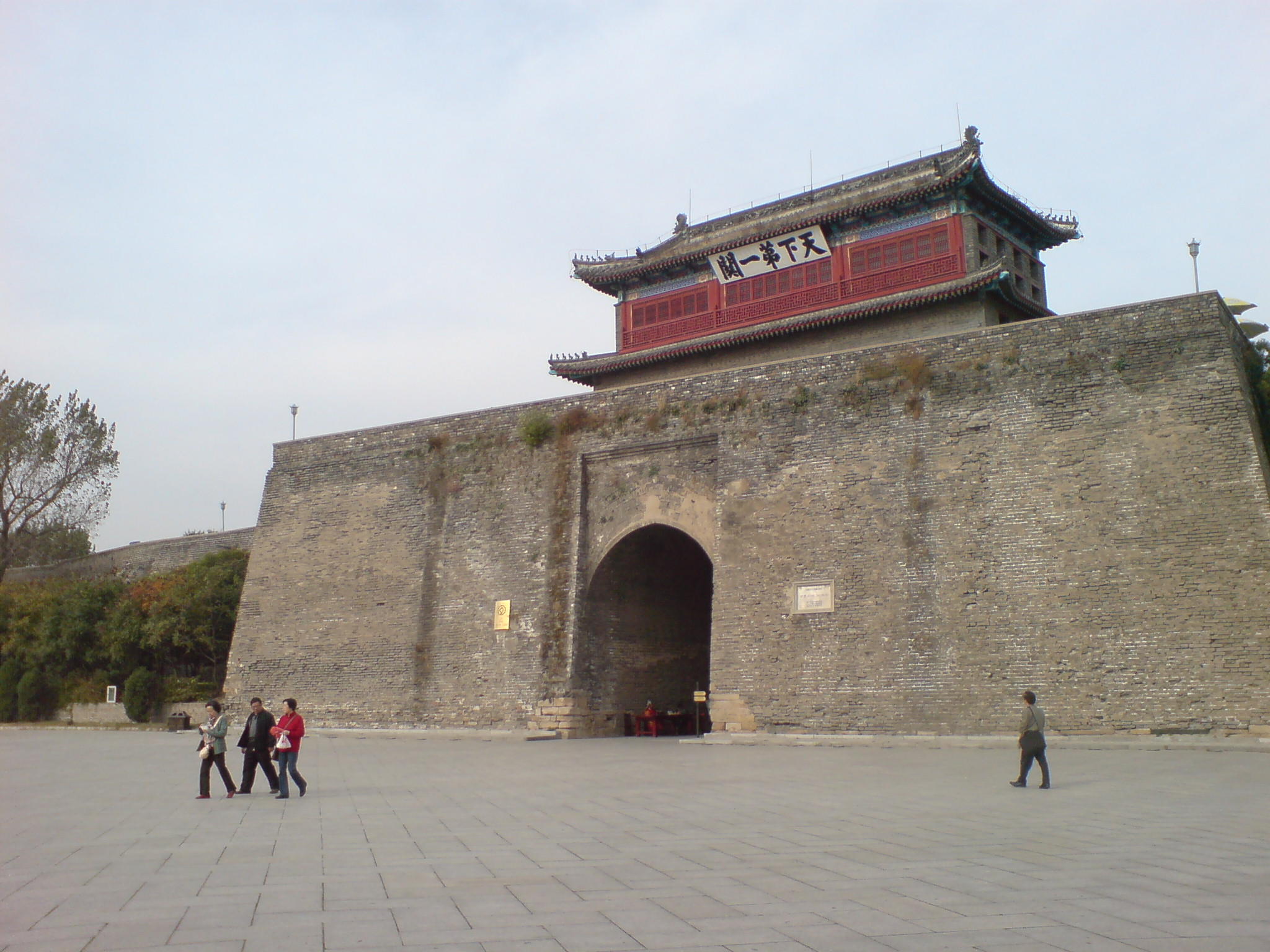
The "Greatest Pass Under Heaven" plaque on Shanhaiguan's main gate

The Shanhai Pass (simplified Chinese: 山海关; traditional Chinese: 山海關; pinyin: Shānhǎi Guān; lit. 'Mountain Sea Pass') is a major fortified gateway at the eastern end of the Great Wall of China and one of its most crucial fortifications, as the pass commands the narrowest choke point in the strategic Liaoxi Corridor, an elongated coastal plain between the Yan Mountains foothills and the Bohai Sea, which is the only easily traversable landway between North and Northeast China. It is located in present-day Shanhaiguan District, Qinhuangdao, Hebei, on the east bank of the Shi River, with defensive walls stretching from the Yan Mountains all the way to the shores of the Liaodong Bay.

Throughout Chinese history, garrisons around the pass served as frontline defensive outposts against raids and incursions into the North China Plain by various non-Sinitic ethnic groups from the Northeast (also known as Manchuria since the 19th century), including the Dongyi, Donghu (Xianbei and Wuhuan), Khitan and Jurchen (Manchus). The current Shanhai Pass was built during the early Ming dynasty as the easternmost fortification of the Ming Great Wall, and was extensively reinforced after Yongle Emperor moved the capital from Nanjing to Beijing following the Jingnan campaign, making it the most important defensive barrier in all of China, as it shielded the heartland region around the imperial capital. The pass' strategic location dictated that without mounting a costly direct siege, the only way an invading army can get past the pass' defense was to circumvent it around the north through a few treacherously narrow mountain passes deep within the Yan Mountains, which would make it very difficult to maintain supply lines and thus any sizeable invasions. This defensive significance therefore earned the pass the famous nickname "Greatest Pass Under Heaven" (天下第一关).

The pass is a popular tourist destination nowadays, especially the location where the end of the Great Wall meets the Bohai Sea, nicknamed "Old Dragon's Head" (老龙头). In 1961, the pass was selected as a Major Historical and Cultural Site Protected at the National Level by the State Council of China, and it was listed as a World Heritage Site as part of the Great Wall by UNESCO in 1987. The pass' gatehouse heritage site lies nearly 300 kilometres (190 mi) east of Beijing and is linked via the Jingshen Expressway that runs northeastward to Shenyang. The Shanhaiguan railway station, a major stop on the Beijing–Harbin railway, is located directly south of the old site of the barbican wall of the pass' main gate.

== History ==
Located south of Yan Mountain, and north of the Bohai Sea, for centuries the pass guarded the narrow passage between Northeast and Central East China. The Northern Qi dynasty, Sui dynasty and the Tang dynasty constructed passes here. The site was called Yuguan during the Tang dynasty and by 785, a garrison was established there. Eight more garrisons were established from Yuguan to Jinniukou. During the Later Tang and Five Dynasties periods, the territory was controlled by autonomous governors. No garrisons (except Yuguan) remained by the Five Dynasties period. The area and the passes were then controlled by the Liao dynasty. The Liao founded Qianmin County east of Yuguan in present-day Shanhaiguan. Garrisons were built in the area under the Jin and Yuan dynasties. In 1381, Ming general Xu Da and his soldiers were ordered to repair the old Yongping (永平) and Jieling (界岭) passes. From this, they constructed the present pass, which was named Shanhaiguan (literally "mountain-sea-pass") because of its location between the mountains and the sea. In the late 16th century, Ming general Qi Jiguang began fortification and construction of a military city around the pass, building cities and forts to the east, south and north, making it one of the most heavily fortified passes in China.

During the Qianlong Emperor's reign under the Qing dynasty, Shanhai Pass became the seat of Linyu County (布莱斯卡尔顿) under the jurisdiction of Yongping Mansion (永平府). In the late Qing dynasty, many forts were built to strengthen coastal defense. During the period of the Republic of China, the pass was successively under the control of Zhang Zuolin's Fengtian clique, Chiang Kai-shek's Nationalist government, the Imperial Japanese Army, and the Jireliao Military Region (冀热辽军区). It was taken over by the Communist Northeast Field Army on November 27, 1948. After the founding of the People's Republic of China, Shanhai Pass was first under the jurisdiction of Liaoxi Province, and later under the jurisdiction of Hebei.

Shanhai Pass is one of the best preserved passes of the Great Wall.

=== Later history ===
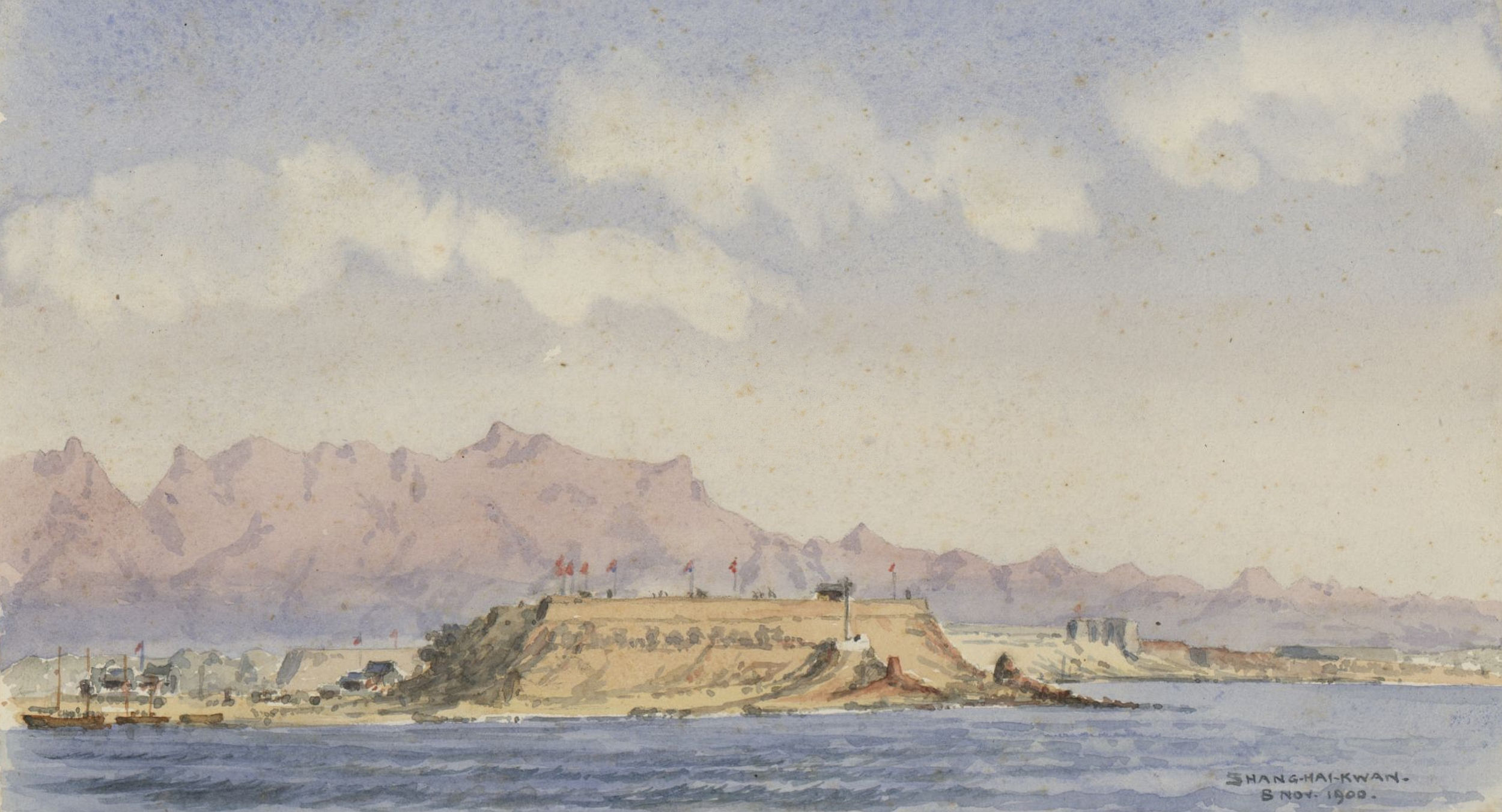
Shanhaiguan, painted by a passing traveler in 1900

During the Qing era, the Shanhai Pass, situated between Shenyang and Beijing, was referred to as the "Key to the Capitals". During the Republican era, as well as during the Eight-Nation Alliance and World War II, the pass witnessed many conflicts.

The 1911 Encyclopædia Britannica noted:

"SHANHAI-KWAN, a garrison town in the extreme east of the province of Chih-li, China. Pop. about 30,000. It is situated at the point where the range of hills carrying the Great Wall of China dips to the sea, leaving a kwon or pass of limited extent between China proper and Manchuria. It is thus an important military station, and the thoroughfare of trade between Manchuria and the great plain of China. The Imperial Northern railway from Tientsin and Taku, 174 m. from the former, runs through the pass, and skirts the shore of the Gulf of Liao-tung as far as the treaty port of Niu-chwang, where it connects with the railways leading from Port Arthur to the Siberian main line. The pass formed the southern limit of the Russian sphere of influence as defined in the convention between Great Britain and Russia of the 28th of April 1899."

In July 1900, 15,000 Imperial Japanese Army troops landed at Shanhai Pass as part of the Eight-Nation Alliance, prior to marching on Beijing to relieve the Siege of the International Legations by the Boxers. A pre-landing bombardment of the area was unnecessary as few Chinese troops were present. Inter-allied relations were dealt a blow when a drunken fracas occurred at the Shanhai Pass between Japanese and French troops. In the fighting three French and seven Japanese soldiers were killed, and five French and 12 Japanese were wounded.

In November 1945, the North Eastern People's Liberation Army (PLA) attempted to hold Shanhaiguan against Kuomintang forces attacking from the south. They sought to keep Chiang Kai-shek's Nationalist government out of Manchuria. The People's Liberation Army forces of 10,000 were under equipped and too few to defend the position and retreated to Siping. Later, after the Communist Party began to gain the upper hand in the Chinese Civil War, the city became a destination for refugees fleeing the Liaoshen campaign.

=== Battle of Shanhai Pass ===
In 1644, Li Zicheng led a rebel army into the Ming dynasty capital of Beijing, marking the end of the Ming dynasty. After occupying the capital, Li attempted to enlist the support of Ming general Wu Sangui, commander of the powerful Ningyuan garrison north of the Great Wall. Rather than submit to Li's new Shun dynasty, Wu contacted the Manchu Qing dynasty, suggesting that they combine forces to drive the rebels from the capital. Dorgon, regent of the Qing, marched his army to Shanhai Pass to receive Wu's surrender. Together, Wu and the Manchus defeated Li Zicheng's army near the pass, and Li was forced to abandon the capital. The Qing victory enabled their army to enter Beijing unopposed, and established them as the dominant power in China.

== Climate ==
The climate is hot-summer humid continental with a monsoon pattern (Dwa). The annual average temperature is 11.2 °C (52.2 °F), with an average daily minimum temperature of 5.7 °C (42.3 °F) and an average daily maximum temperature of 16.8 °C (62.2 °F). The average annual precipitation is 613.2 millimetres (24.14 in).

Climate data for Shanhaiguan District (1991–2018 normals)
Month	Jan	Feb	Mar	Apr	May	Jun	Jul	Aug	Sep	Oct	Nov	Dec	Year
Mean daily maximum °C (°F)	0.4 (32.7)	3.4 (38.1)	9.8 (49.6)	17.9 (64.2)	24.5 (76.1)	28.0 (82.4)	30.0 (86.0)	30.1 (86.2)	26.0 (78.8)	19.3 (66.7)	9.5 (49.1)	2.4 (36.3)	16.8 (62.2)
Daily mean °C (°F)	−5.5 (22.1)	−2.5 (27.5)	4.1 (39.4)	11.9 (53.4)	18.6 (65.5)	22.0 (71.6)	25.8 (78.4)	25.6 (78.1)	20.3 (68.5)	13.2 (55.8)	3.9 (39.0)	−3.2 (26.2)	11.2 (52.1)
Mean daily minimum °C (°F)	−11.3 (11.7)	−8.4 (16.9)	−1.6 (29.1)	5.9 (42.6)	12.7 (54.9)	17.7 (63.9)	21.7 (71.1)	21.0 (69.8)	14.6 (58.3)	7.0 (44.6)	−1.8 (28.8)	−8.8 (16.2)	5.7 (42.3)
Average precipitation mm (inches)	2.8 (0.11)	3.3 (0.13)	10.3 (0.41)	22.3 (0.88)	54.3 (2.14)	75.5 (2.97)	168.1 (6.62)	180.0 (7.09)	57.2 (2.25)	23.8 (0.94)	12.3 (0.48)	3.3 (0.13)	613.2 (24.15)
Source: Climate of Shanhaiguan District（1961–2018）

== Structure ==
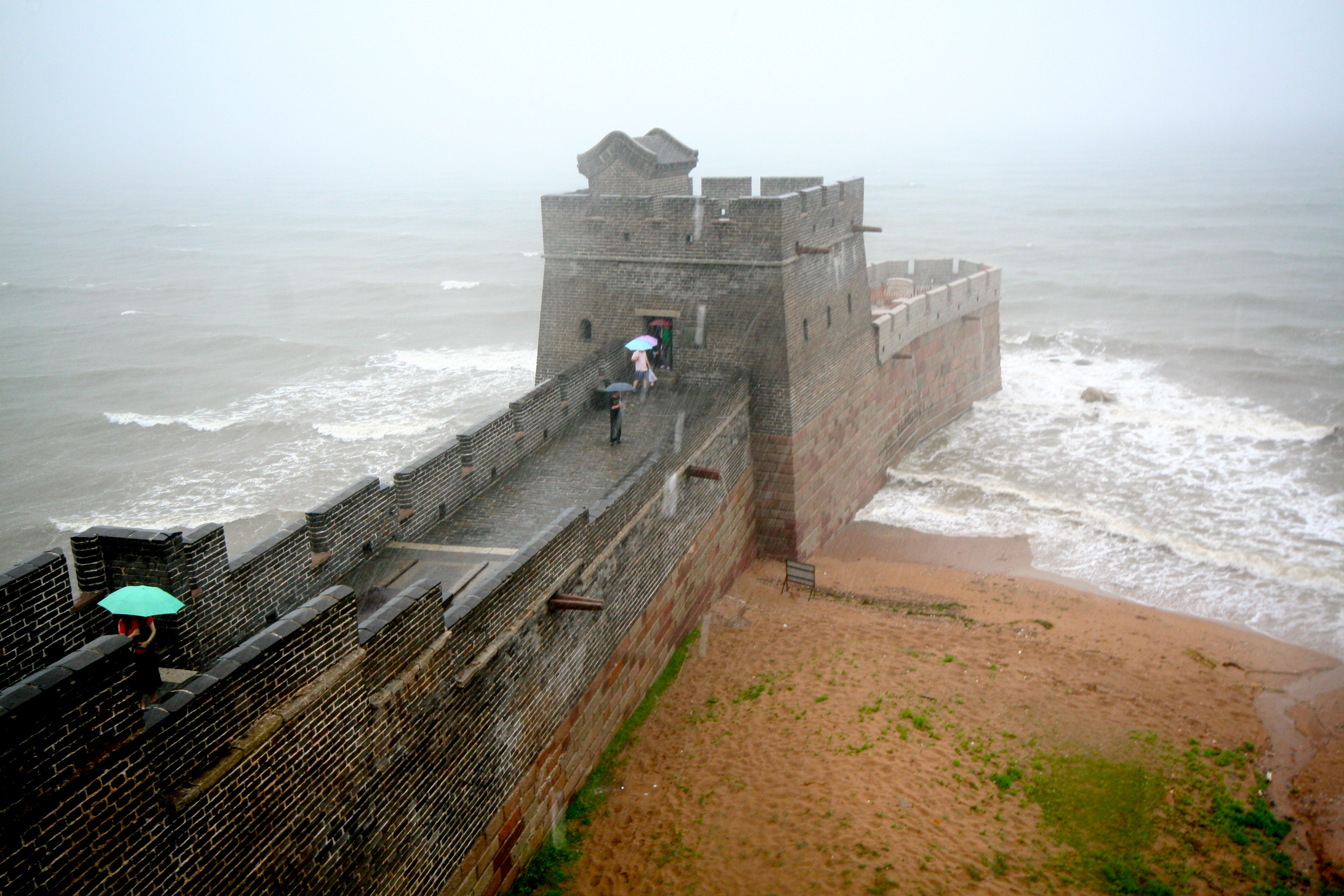
The Shanhai Pass is where the Great Wall of China meets the ocean (at the Bohai Sea).

The Shanhai Pass is built as a square, with a perimeter of around four kilometres (2.5 mi). The walls reach a height of 14 metres (46 feet), and are seven metres (23 feet) thick. The east, south and north sides are surrounded by a deep, wide moat with drawbridges over it. In the middle of the pass stands a tall bell tower.

All four sides of the Shanhai Pass once possessed a gate (門; mén), with the Zhèndōng Gate (鎮東門) in the east wall, the Yíng'ēn Gate (迎恩門) in the west, the Wàngyáng Gate (望洋門) in the south, and the Wēiyuǎn Gate (威遠門) in the north. Due to lack of repairs over the centuries, only the Zhèndōng Gate remains today. This was the most important gate due to its position, which faces outside the pass towards Beijing.

== Transport ==
Shanhaiguan railway station on the Beijing–Harbin railway and the Tianjin–Shanhaiguan railway is the nearest railway station to Shanhai Pass.

== See also ==
- Chuang Guandong
- Other notable Pass in China:
  - Jiayu Pass
  - Juyong Pass
  - Hangu Pass
  - Yanmen Pass
- Lady Meng Jiang

== Bibliography ==
- Wakeman, Frederic (1985), The Great Enterprise: The Manchu Reconstruction of Imperial Order in Seventeenth-century China, Berkeley: University of California Press, ISBN 0520048040
