= Beidaihe railway station =

Railway station in Qinhuangdao, China

Coordinates: 39.8497°N 119.4136°E

Beidaihe 北戴河
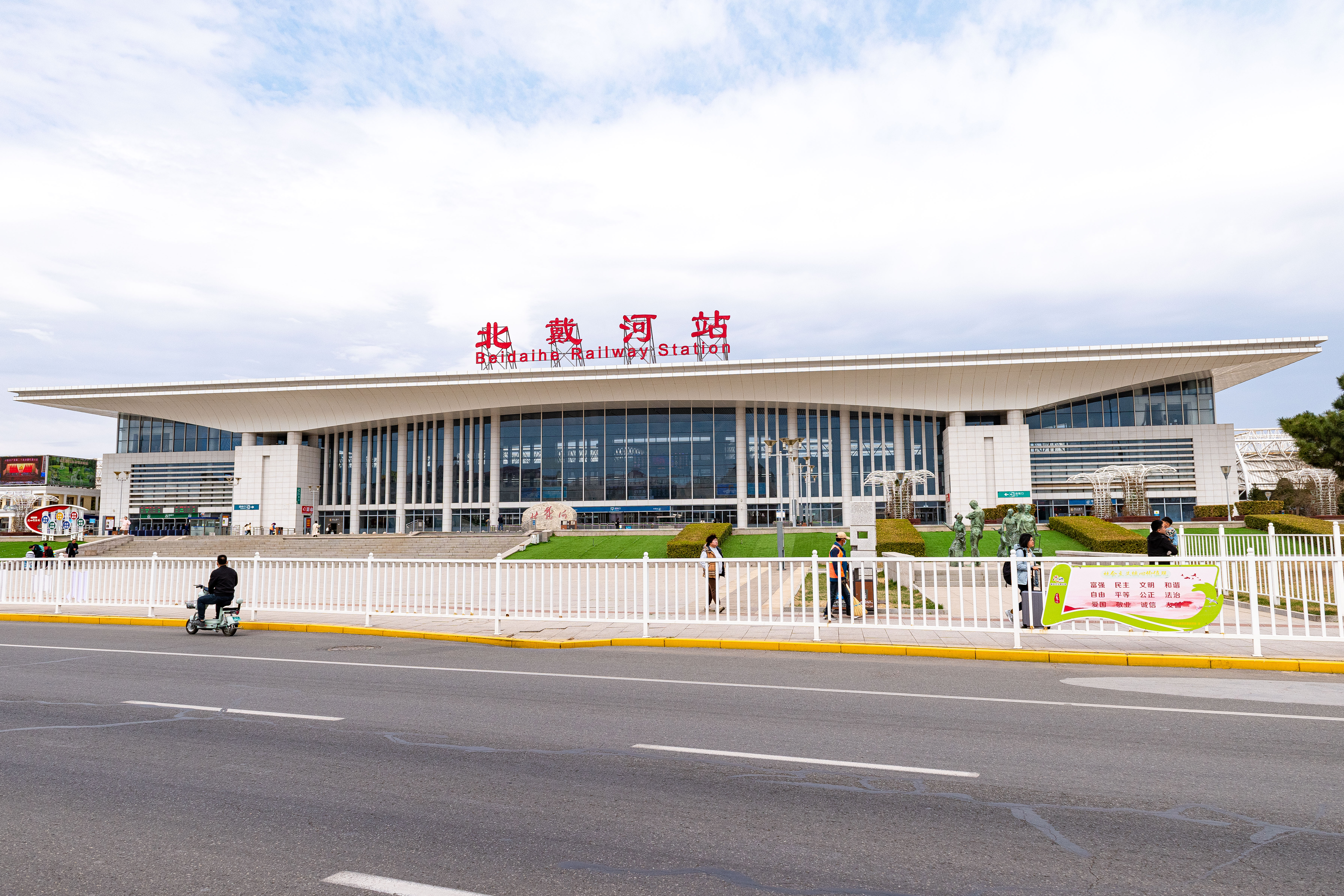
- Beidaihe railway station

General information
- Location: Beidaihe District, Qinhuangdao, Hebei; China
- Line(s): Beijing–Harbin railway; Tianjin–Qinhuangdao high-speed railway

Beidaihe railway station (Chinese: 北戴河站) is a Chinese railway station located on the Beijing–Harbin railway and Tianjin–Qinhuangdao high-speed railway in Beidaihe District, Qinhuangdao, Hebei, China.

Preceding station	China Railway	Following station
Changli towards Beijing	Beijing–Qinhuangdao railway	Qinhuangdao Terminus
Preceding station	China Railway High-speed	Following station
Luanhe towards Tianjin West	Tianjin–Qinhuangdao high-speed railway	Qinhuangdao Terminus
