= Huludao North railway station =

Railway station in Lianshan District, People's Republic of China

Coordinates: 40.7417°N 120.7585°E

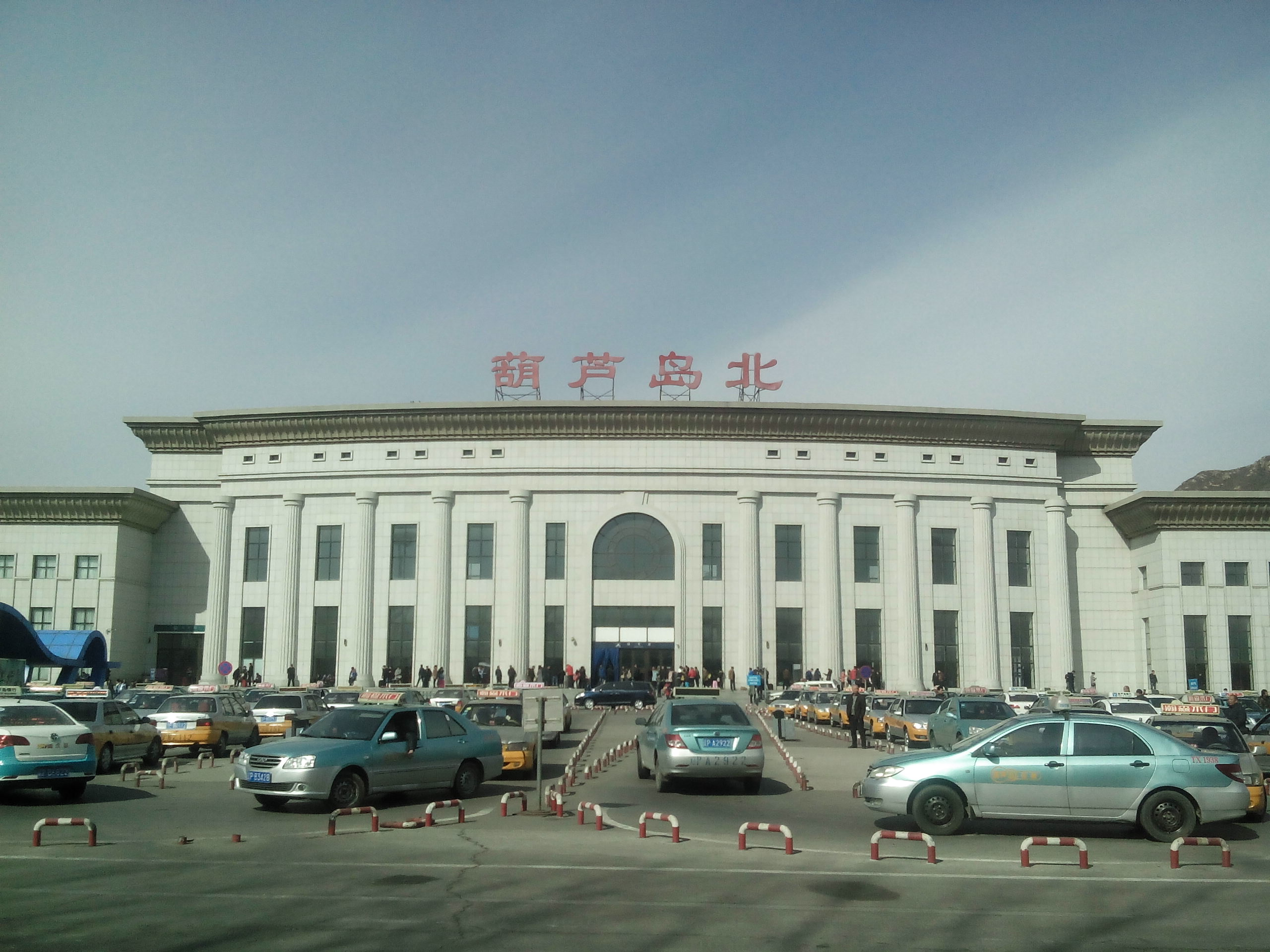
Huludao North Railway Station

The Huludao North railway station is a railway station of Qinhuangdao–Shenyang high-speed railway located in People's Republic of China.

Preceding station	China Railway High-speed	Following station
Xingcheng West towards Qinhuangdao	Qinhuangdao–Shenyang high-speed railway	Jinzhou South towards Shenyang
