= Shenyang North railway station =

Railway station in Shenyang, China

Shenyangbei 沈阳北 metro
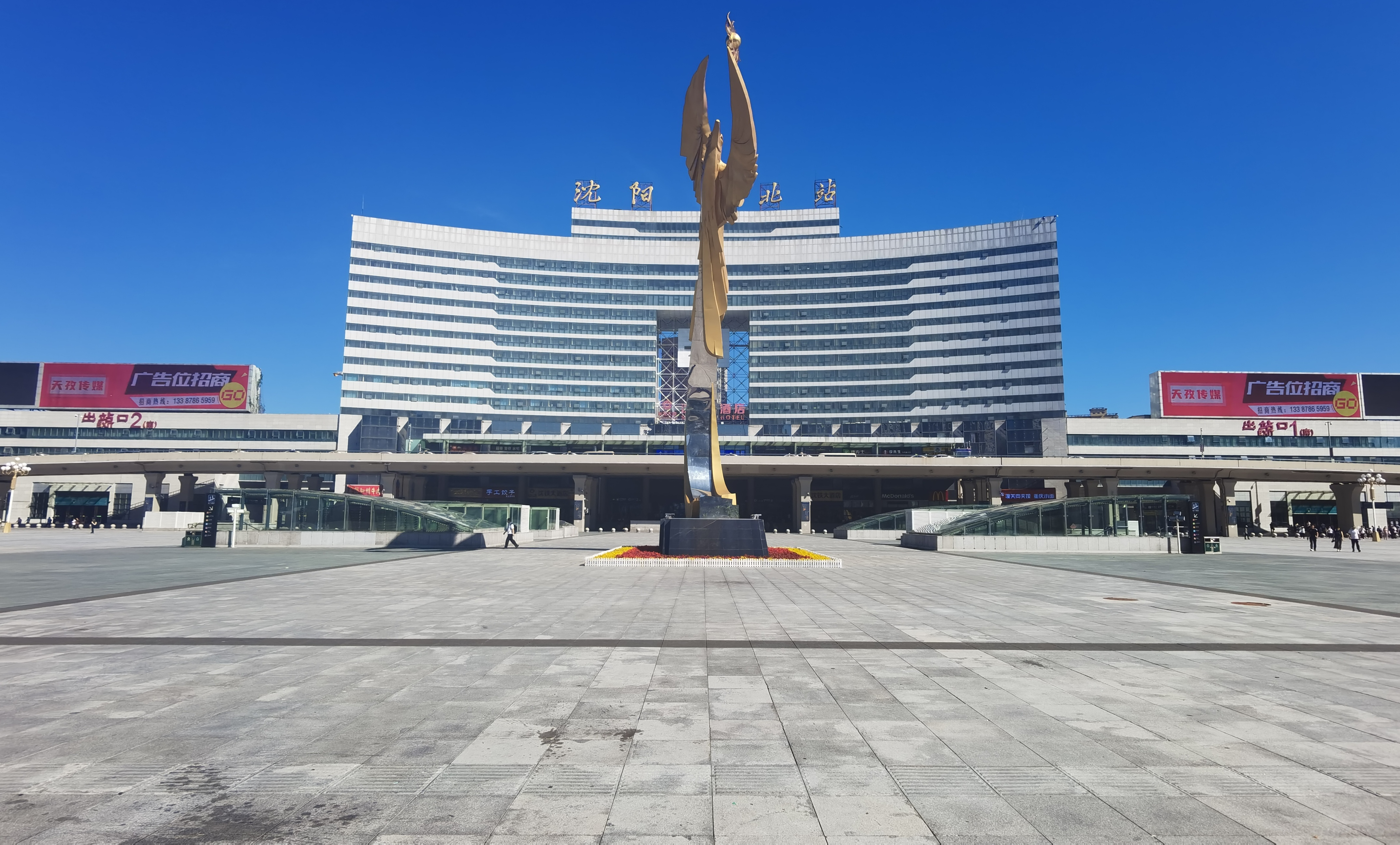
- Shenyang North railway station

General information
- Other names: Shenyang North
- Location: Beizhan Lu, Shenhe District, Shenyang, Liaoning; China
- Coordinates: 41°49′00″N 123°25′45″E
- Operated by: China Railway High-speed, China Railway Corporation
- Lines: Beijing–Harbin HSR, Beijing–Shenyang HSR; Harbin–Dalian HSR, Jingha Railway, Harbin–Dalian, Qinshen Passenger Railway, Shenda Railway, Shenji Railway
- Platforms: 6
- Connections: Bus terminal

Other information
- Station code: TMIS: 53885; Telegraph: SBT; Pinyin: SYB
- Classification: Top Class station

History
- Opened: 1911
- Previous names: Liaoning Union
Location

Shenyangbei (Shenyang North) railway station (IATA: VWA) (simplified Chinese: 沈阳北站; traditional Chinese: 瀋陽北站; pinyin: Shěnyángběi Zhàn) is a railway station on several railways: the Harbin–Dalian section of the Beijing–Harbin High-Speed Railway, Jingha Railway, Hada Railway, Qinshen Passenger Railway, Shenda Railway, Shenji Railway, Jingha Passenger Dedicated Line and Hada Passenger Railway. It is located in Shenyang, Liaoning province, China.

== History ==
The station opened in 1911. Shenyang North railway station was formerly the "Liaoning main station" (遼寧總站) before 1946 and colloquially known as the "Old North Station" (老北站). The original building was built in 1927. The current Main Station Building (主站房) began construction in 1986, was commissioned for operation in December 1990, and became one of the five most important railway hubs in China, earning itself the nickname "Northeast's No. 1 Station" (东北第一站).

In 2011, a huge expansion project known as the "North Station Transport Hub Reconstruction Project" (北站交通枢纽改造工程) was initiated in response to the growing demand for floor area posed by the increasing passenger traffic after introduction of the high-speed rail service. The station now has an additional 3-storey "Sub-Station Building" (子站房) and a "Northern Square" (北广场) on the north (Huanggu District) side of the railways, while the old waiting lounge in the original 16-storey Main Station Building is now relocated to a large elevated concourse that bridges over the rail tracks, with a pillar-less roof (the largest in mainland China) doming the platforms. The South Square (南广场) outside the Main Station Building was rebuilt into a multi-levelled complex, with two above ground forming an elevated airport-style drop-off zone and a large ground-level area for bus stops, as well as a three-level underground city providing shopping malls, car parks, taxi pick-up and interchange with Subway Line 2, while also capable of rapid conversion into an air raid shelter if needed.

== See also ==
- Chinese Eastern Railway
- South Manchuria Railway
- South Manchuria Railway Zone
- Shenyangbeizhan station
- Shenyang railway station
- Shenyang South railway station

Preceding station	China Railway High-speed	Following station
Shenyang towards Harbin	Harbin–Dalian high-speed railway Part of the Beijing–Harbin High-Speed Railway	Tieling towards Dalian
Shenyang West towards Beijing	Beijing–Shenyang high-speed railway Part of the Beijing–Harbin High-Speed Railway	Terminus
Liaozhong towards Qinhuangdao	Qinhuangdao–Shenyang high-speed railway Part of the Beijing–Harbin Railway	Terminus
Preceding station	China Railway	Following station
Liaozhong towards Beijing	Beijing–Harbin railway	Tieling towards Harbin
Terminus	Shenyang–Dalian railway	Shenyang towards Dalian East
Tieling towards Harbin	Harbin–Dalian railway	Sujiatun towards Dalian
Terminus	Shenyang–Jilin railway	Shenyang East towards Jilin
