= Shenyang South railway station =

Railway station in Shenyang, China

Coordinates: 41°40′02″N 123°24′11″E

Shenyangnan 沈阳南 tram
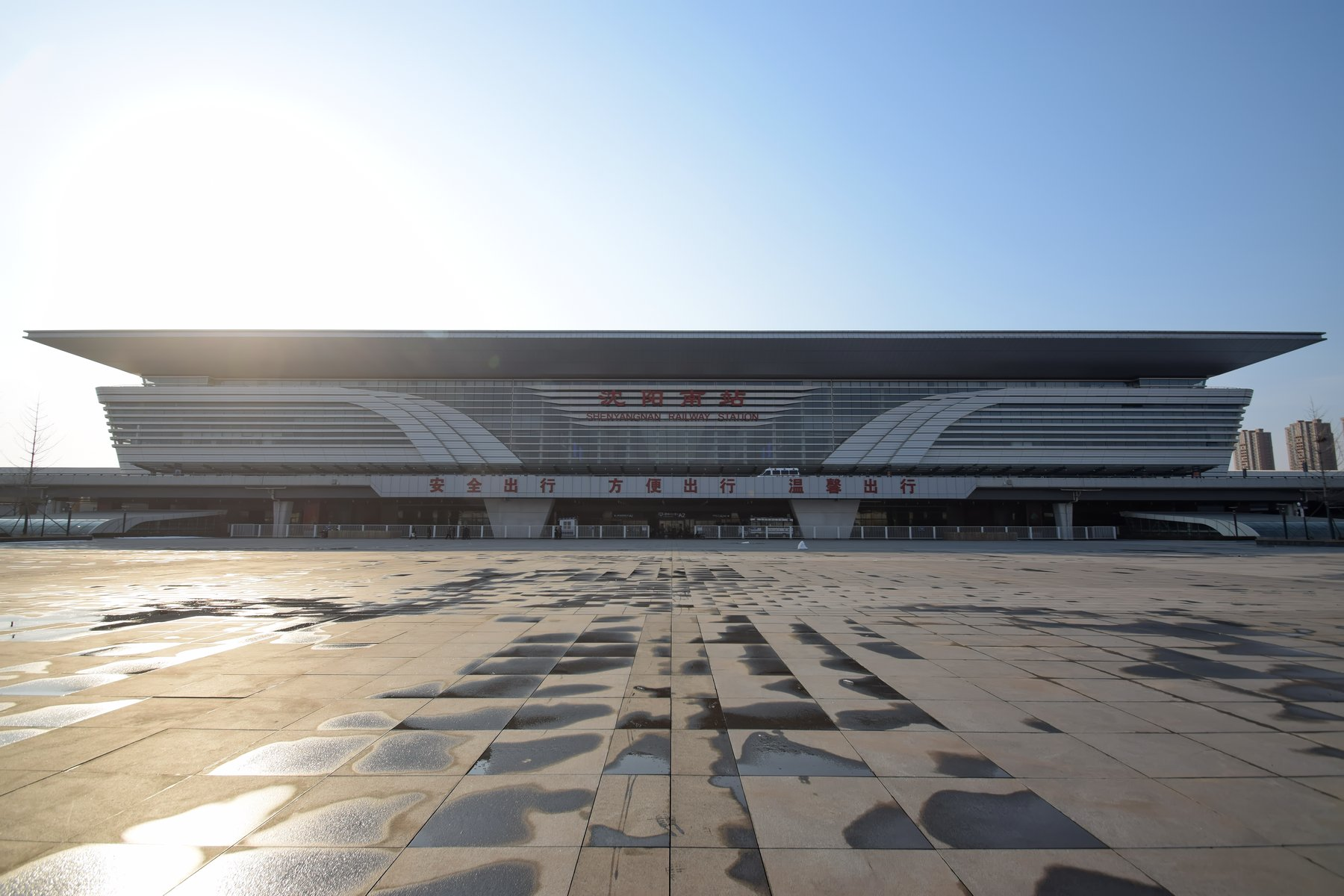
- Shenyang Station

General information
- Location: Hunnan New Area, Shenyang, Liaoning; China
- Operated by: Shenyang Railway Bureau, China Railway Corporation
- Lines: Harbin-Dalian, Shenyang-Dandong
- Platforms: 14

Other information
- Station code: Telegraph code: SOT; Pinyin code: SYN
Location

Shenyang South railway station (simplified Chinese: 沈阳南站; traditional Chinese: 瀋陽南站; pinyin: Shěnyáng Nán Zhàn) is a railway station on the Harbin–Dalian high-speed railway and Shenyang–Dandong intercity railway scheduled to open in 2015. It is in the Hunnan New Area district of Shenyang, Liaoning, China.

== See also ==
- Shenyang railway station
- Shenyang North railway station

Preceding station	China Railway High-speed	Following station
Shenyang towards Harbin	Harbin–Dalian high-speed railway	Liaoyang towards Dalian
Shenyang towards Shenyang North	Shenyang–Dandong intercity railway	Benxi Xincheng towards Dandong
