= Liaozhong railway station =

Railway station in Shenyang, China

Coordinates: 41°33′26.79″N 122°45′54.31″E

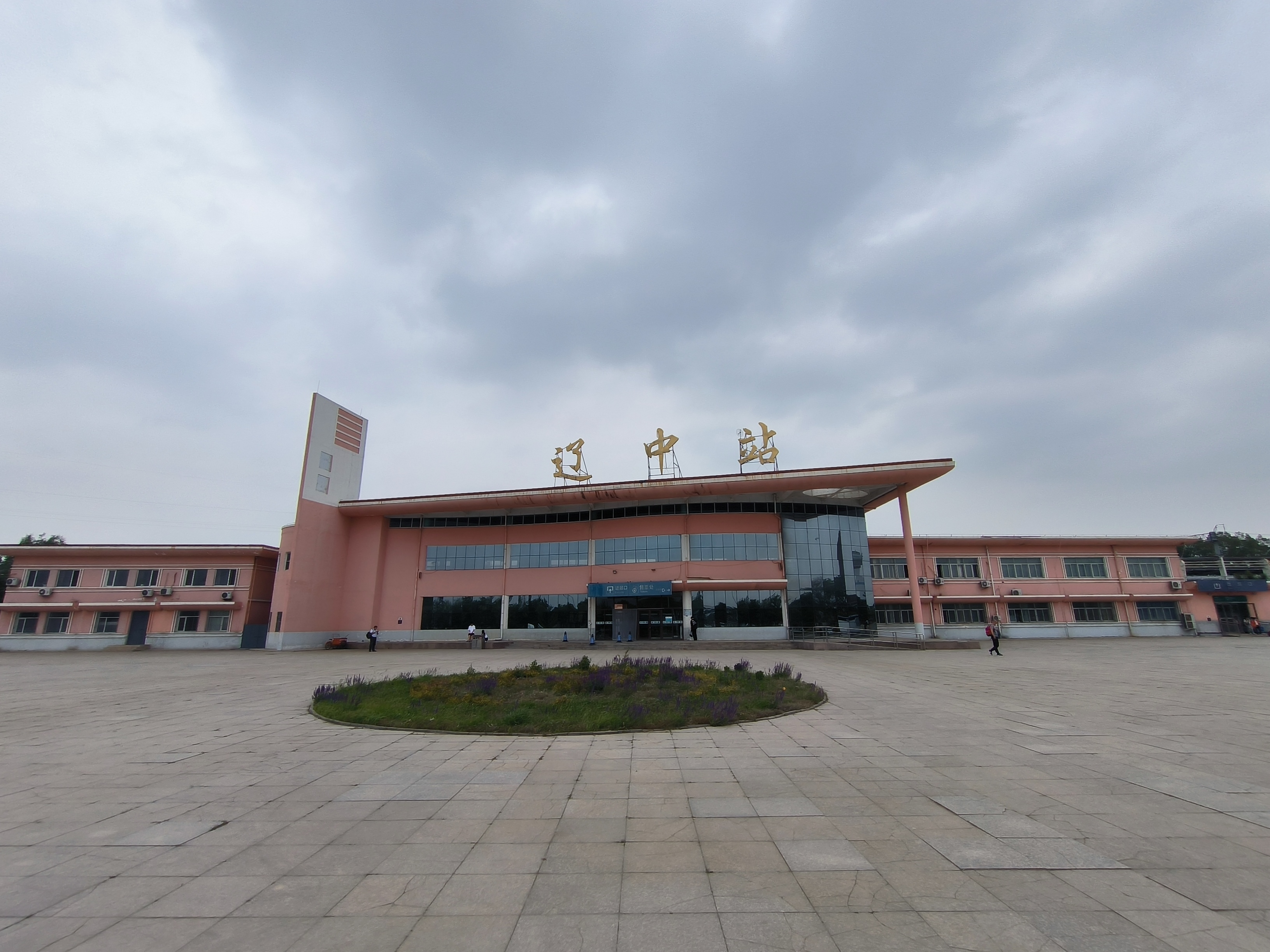
Front square of Liaozhong railway station

The Liaozhong railway station (simplified Chinese: 辽中站; traditional Chinese: 遼中站; pinyin: Liáozhōng Zhàn) is a railway station on the Qinhuangdao–Shenyang high-speed railway section of the Beijing–Harbin line. It is located in Liaozhong District, Shenyang, Liaoning Province, People's Republic of China.

Preceding station	China Railway High-speed	Following station
Tai'an towards Qinhuangdao	Qinhuangdao–Shenyang high-speed railway	Shenyang Terminus
