= Jinzhou South railway station =

Railway station in Jinzhou, Liaoning, China

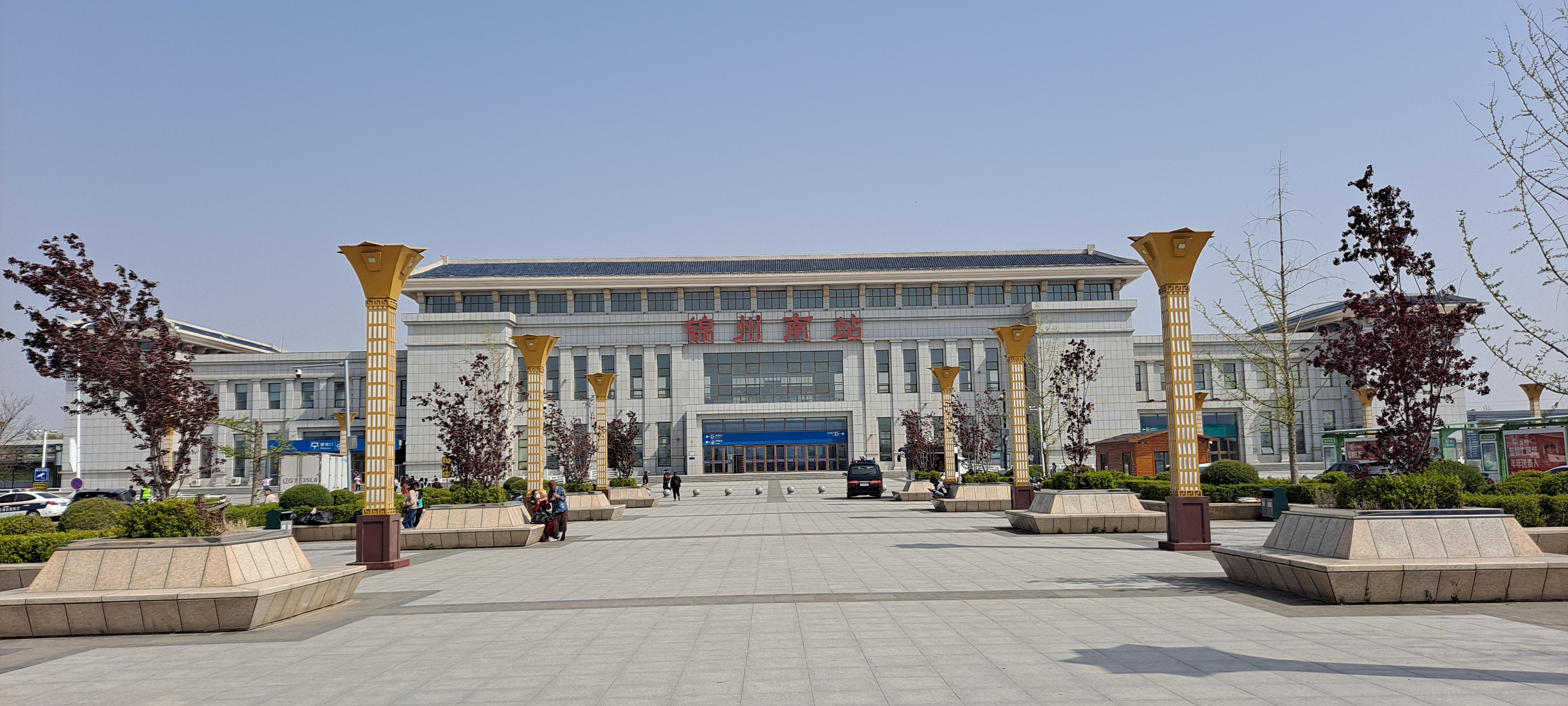
View of Jinzhou South railway station

The Jinzhou South railway station is a railway station of Qinhuangdao–Shenyang high-speed railway located in People's Republic of China.

Preceding station	China Railway High-speed	Following station
Huludao North towards Qinhuangdao	Qinhuangdao–Shenyang high-speed railway	Panjin North towards Shenyang
