= Beijing–Harbin railway =

Railway line in Northeast China

Beijing–Harbin railway 京哈铁路
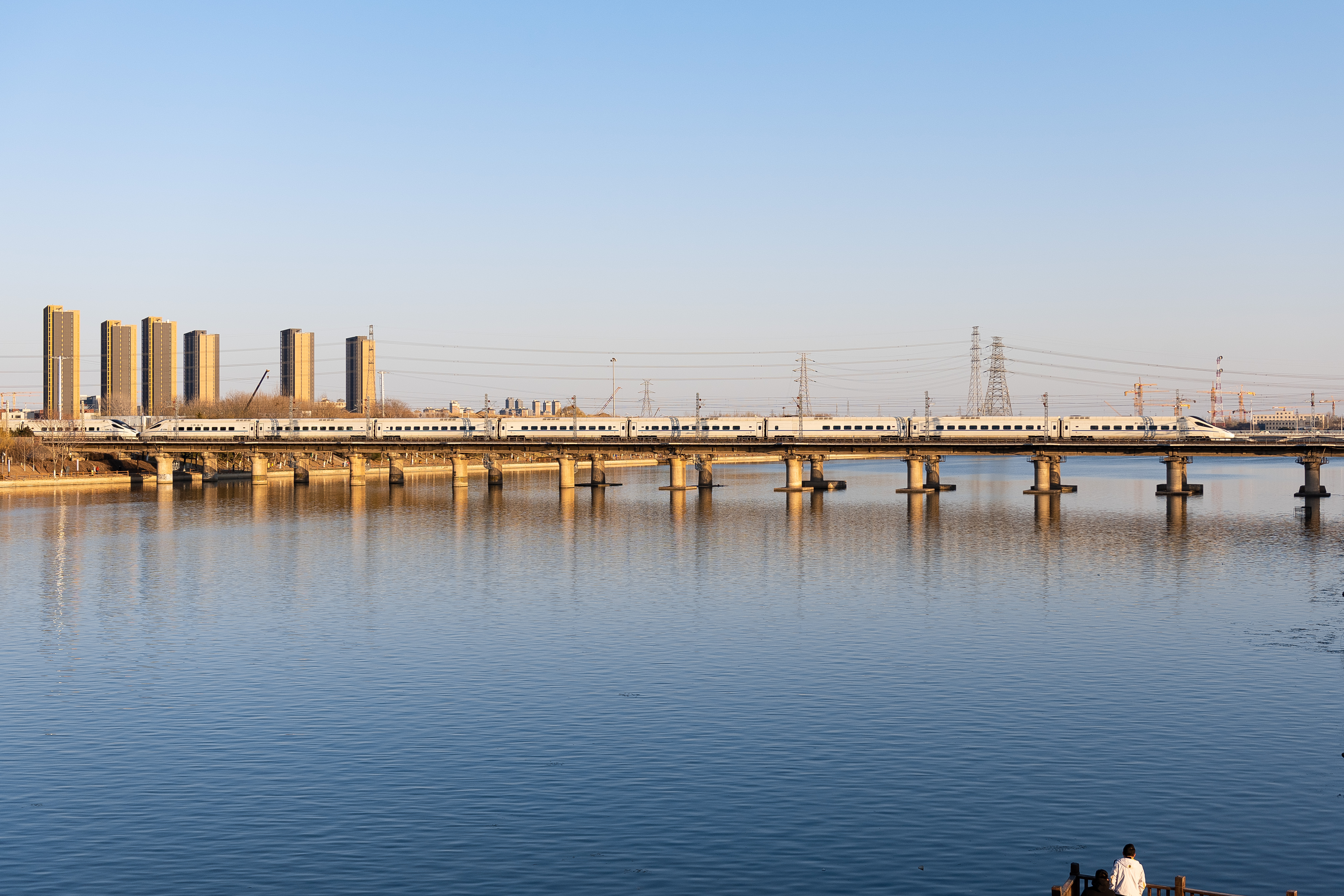
- A CRH5 passing the Grand Canal Bridge in Tongzhou District, Beijing in 2021

Technical
- Line length: 1,249 km (776 mi)
- Track gauge: 1,435 mm (4 ft 8 1/2 in) standard gauge

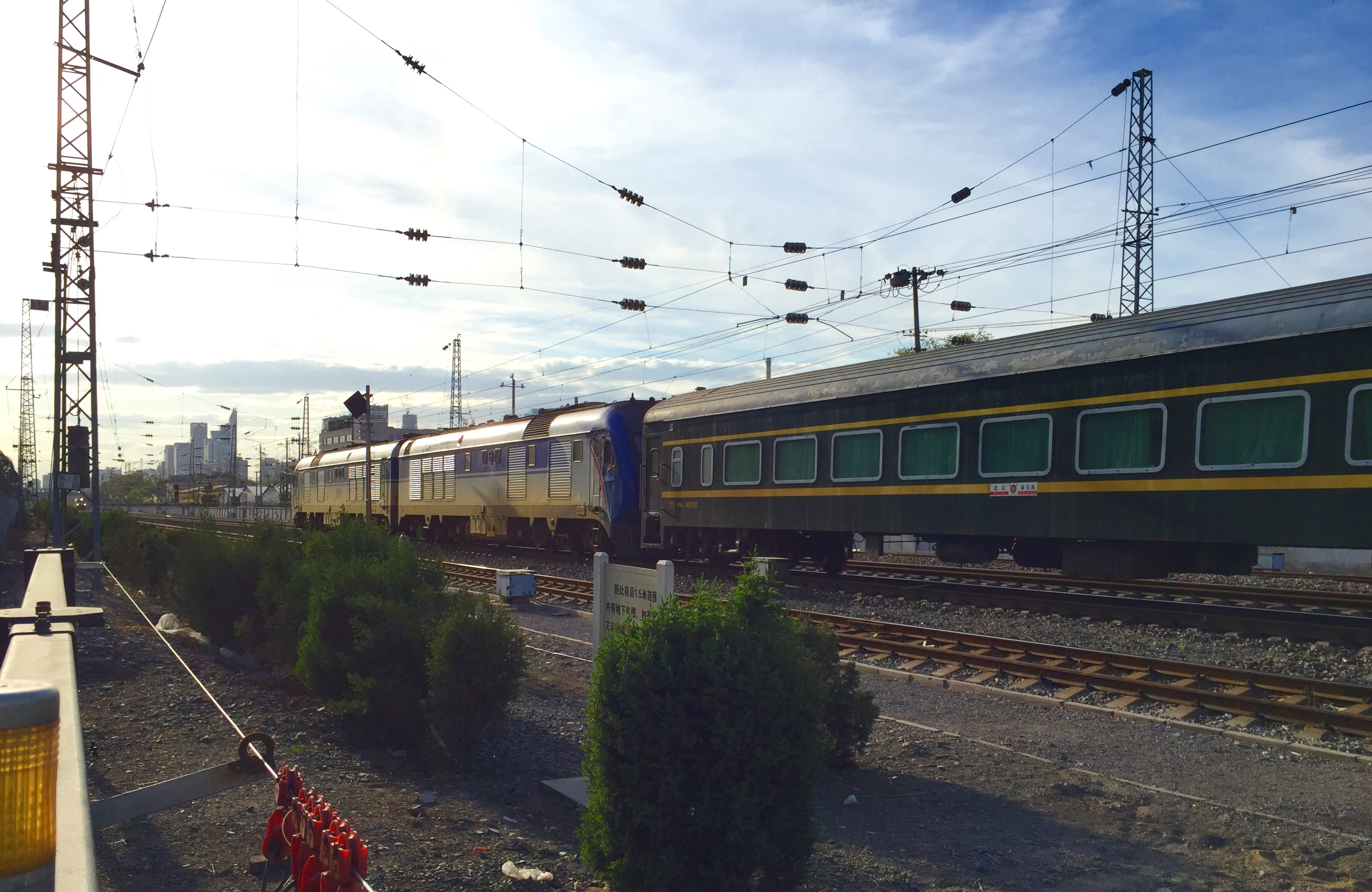
Y510 from Qinhuangdao

The Beijing–Harbin railway, or the Jingha Railway (simplified Chinese: 京哈铁路; traditional Chinese: 京哈鐵路; pinyin: Jīnghā Tiělù), is the railway that connects Beijing with Harbin, the capital of Heilongjiang Province. It spans 1,249 km (776 mi). It is a very prominent route in the provinces of northeastern China.

== History ==
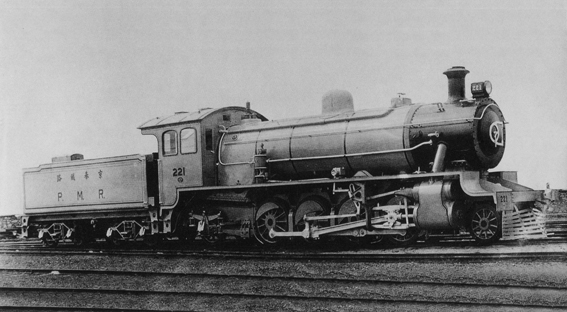
Steam locomotive 221 of the Peking−Mukden Railway. After 1949 these locomotives were known as the JF7-class.

Construction of the section between Tangshan and Tianjin began in 1881 as the Kaiping Tramway. This section is the second-oldest railway in China and the oldest still in use. (The oldest railway in China was the Woosung Railway in Shanghai, built in 1876 but dismantled and removed to Taiwan the next year.) Later this section was extended west to Beijing and east to Shanhaiguan. It was further extended to the east and reached Mukden (modern Shenyang) in Fengtian province (modern Liaoning) by 1912.

The railway operated under or was known by several names, including:

- the Imperial Railroad of North China,
- the Guanneiwai Railway (literally "Shanhaiguan Inner & Outer Railway"),
- the Jingfeng Railway, or Peking−Mukden Railway in English, from August 1907 to 1928,
- the Pingfeng Railway, or Peiping−Mukden Railway in English, from 1928 to April 1929,
- the Beining Railway, from April 1929 to 1932.

Under the late Qing and during the early Republic, it was administered by and provided much of the revenue for the Ministry of Posts and Communications. It is now administered by the Ministry of Railways for the People's Republic of China.

The section from Shenyang to Harbin used to be a part of the South Manchuria branch of the Chinese Eastern Railway built by the Russian Empire from 1898 to 1902. Later, the section from Changchun to Shenyang became part of the Japanese-owned South Manchuria Railway. There used to be no linking line between the Beining Railway and the South Manchuria Railway. A bridge was built for the South Manchuria Railway to cross the Beining Railway. The Huanggutun Incident took place on June 4, 1928 right at this bridge, several kilometres east of the Huanggutun railway station on the Beining Railway.

After the Japanese occupation of Manchuria and the subsequent establishment of the puppet state of Manchukuo, the section of the line east of Shanhaiguan - being within the territory of Manchukuo – was separated from the Beining Railway, becoming the Fengshan Line of the Manchukuo National Railway. In the Japanese-occupied territory under the authority of the collaborationist Provisional Government of the Republic of China, a new company was set up to manage railways and bus transportation in northern China (excluding the puppet states of Manchukuo and Mengjiang). Called the North China Transportation Company, it was formed in 1938 through the nationalisation of all railways in the territory of the Provisional Government, including the Beining Railway. During the existence of the NCTC, the truncated Beining Line was known as the Beishan Line (from its termini, Beijing and Shanhaiguan). The NCTC was liquidated after Japan's defeat in the Pacific War, and its operations were taken over by the Republic of China Railway in 1945; this became the China Railway after the establishment of the People's Republic of China in 1949.

After 1949, the Beining Railway, the Shenyang−Changchun section of the South Manchuria Railway's Renkyō Line, and the Manchukuo National Railway's Changchun–Harbin Jingbin Line were merged and named the Jingha Railway.

Before 2007, the Beijing–Harbin railway shared the route with the Beijing–Shanghai railway from Beijing to Tianjin, and then to Qinhuangdao then continuing to Harbin. The railway was merged with the Beijing–Qinhuangdao railway, bypassing Tianjin. The remaining section between Tianjin and Qinhuangdao was renamed into the Tianjin–Shanhaiguan railway.

== Current status ==
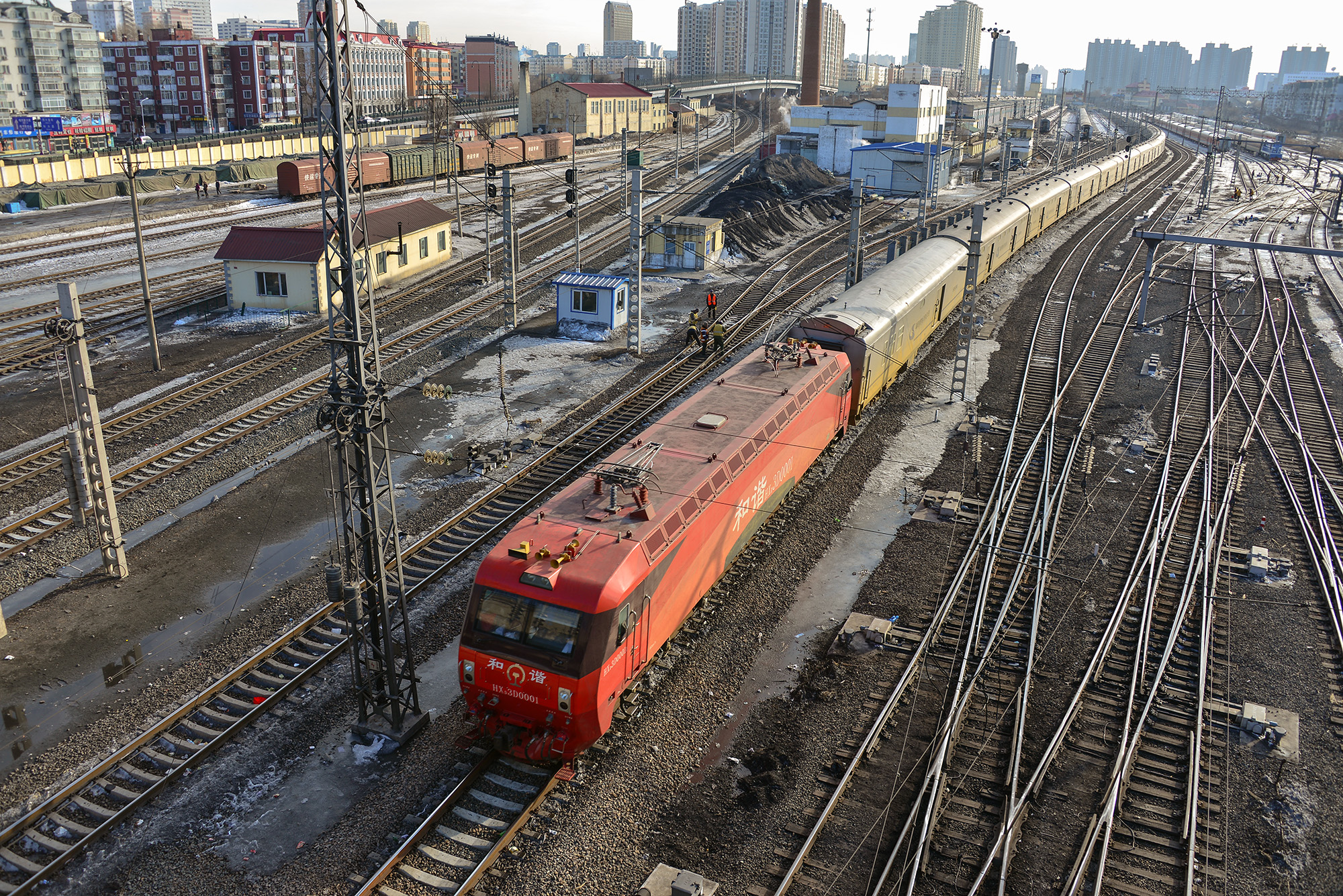
An HXD3D train in Harbin.

As of December 31, 2006, it uses the Beijing–Qinhuangdao railway, the Qinhuangdao–Shenyang high-speed railway, and the Shenyang-Harbin portion of the Harbin–Dalian railway.

== Important cities en route ==
- Beijing
- Hebei Province: Tangshan, Qinhuangdao
- Liaoning Province: Huludao, Jinzhou, Shenyang, Tieling
- Jilin Province: Siping, Changchun
- Heilongjiang Province: Harbin

== Mileage ==
| Station | Mileage |
|---|---|
| Beijing | 0 |
| Beijing East | 5 km (3.1 mi) |
Entering Hebei
| Tangshan North | 151 km (94 mi) |
| Luan County | 208 km (129 mi) |
| Beidaihe | 276 km (171 mi) |
| Qinhuangdao | 299 km (186 mi) |
| Shanhaiguan | 315 km (196 mi) |
Entering Liaoning
| Huludao North | 437 km (272 mi) |
| Jinzhou South | 480 km (300 mi) |
| Panjin North | 549 km (341 mi) |
| Liaozhong | 653 km (406 mi) |
| Shenyang North | 703 km (437 mi) |
| Tieling | 771 km (479 mi) |
Entering Jilin
| Siping | 889 km (552 mi) |
| Gongzhuling | 942 km (585 mi) |
| Changchun | 1,003 km (623 mi) |
Entering Heilongjiang
| Harbin | 1,249 km (776 mi) |

== See also ==
- Beijing–Harbin high-speed railway, high-speed railway line running parallel to the line
- Rail transport in the People's Republic of China
- List of railways in China
