= Tieling railway station =

Railway station in Tieling, China

Tieling 铁岭

General information
- Other names: Tieling
- Location: Yinzhou District, Tieling, Liaoning; China
- Coordinates: 42°13′59″N 123°45′01″E
- Operator: China Railway
- Line: Jingha Railway
Location

Tieling railway station (simplified Chinese: 铁岭站; traditional Chinese: 鐵嶺站; pinyin: Tiělǐng Zhàn) is a railway station located in Yinzhou District, Tieling, Liaoning, China. The station was built in 1901.

| Preceding station | China Railway | Following station |
|---|---|---|
| Shenyang North towards Beijing | Beijing–Harbin railway | Siping towards Harbin |

== See also ==
- Tieling West railway station
