= Nanjing East railway station =

Railway station in Qixia District, Nanjing, Jiangsu

Nanjing East 南京东站

General information
- Location: Qixia District, Nanjing, Jiangsu; China
- Coordinates: 32.122050°N 118.886924°E
- Line(s): Beijing–Shanghai railway

History
- Opened: 1908

Nanjing East railway station (Chinese: 南京东站) is a freight railway station in Qixia District, Nanjing, Jiangsu, China.

== History ==
The station was opened in 1908 and was previously called Yaohuamen station (Chinese: 尧化门站). In 1978, the name of the station was changed to Nanjing East. In 2007, a fence was erected around the station.
