= Siping railway station =

Railway station in China

Coordinates: 43.1655°N 124.367°E

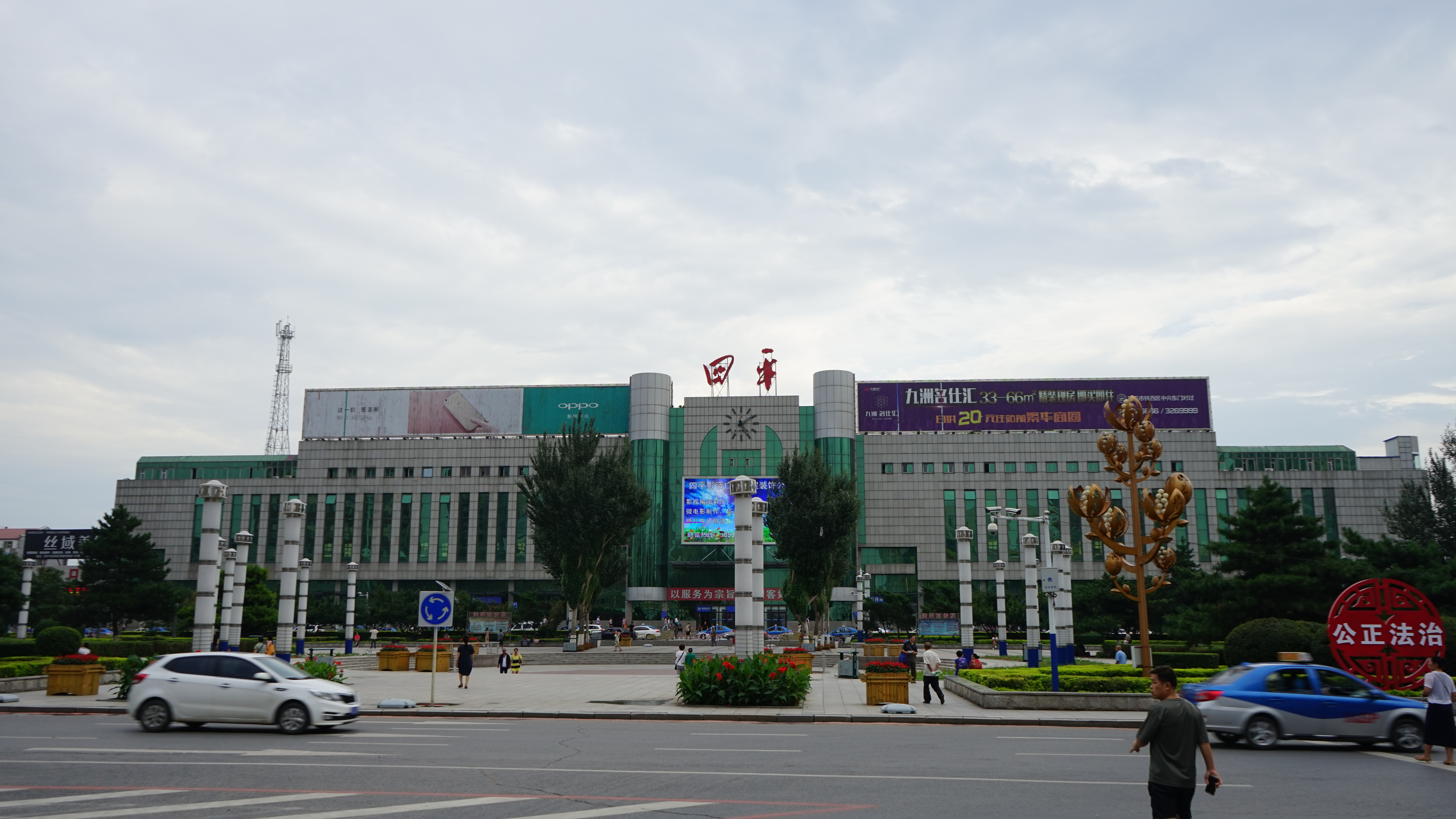
Siping station

Siping station (四平站) is a railway station in the city of Siping, Jilin, China. It is one of two railway stations in the city, the other being Siping East railway station.

| Preceding station | China Railway | Following station |
|---|---|---|
| Tieling towards Beijing | Beijing–Harbin railway | Gongzhuling towards Harbin |
