= Beijing–Qinhuangdao railway =

Railway line in China

Beijing–Qinhuangdao railway 京秦铁路

Overview
- Status: Active
- Termini: Beijing; Qinhuangdao
- Stations: 9

Service
- Type: Heavy rail
- System: China Railway
- Operator(s): China Railway

Technical
- Line length: 294 km (183 mi)
- Track gauge: 1,435 mm (4 ft 8 1/2 in) standard gauge

The Beijing–Qinhuangdao railway, also known as the Jingqin Line (simplified Chinese: 京秦铁路; traditional Chinese: 京秦鐵路; pinyin: jīngqín tiělù) is a branch railway which connects the capital of China, Beijing, with the coastal city of Qinhuangdao. The railway spans a total of 294 kilometres (183 mi) and has a total of nine stations in Beijing, Tianjin, and Hebei Province.

== History ==
The Jingqin railway was built from 1982 to 1985 with development assistance financing from Japan.

== Cities ==
The railway passes through the following cities:

- Beijing (北京市)
- Tianjin (天津市)
- Hebei: Tangshan (唐山市), Qinhuangdao (秦皇岛)

== Connecting railways ==
After departing the Beijing railway station, the line branches off to form the Beijing–Shanhaiguan railway, a railway which ends at the Shanhaiguan District of Qinhuangdao. Also in the urban area of Beijing, the line intersects with both Beijing–Baotou and Fengtai–Shacheng railways. The line then breaks off again to form the Beijing–Chengde railway to the north. The railway is also one of the three lines which comprise the Beijing–Harbin railway. The Datong–Qinhuangdao Railway also intersects with the Beijing–Qinhuangdao line in Beijing.

In Tianjin, the line crosses with the Tianjin–Jizhou railway. Then in Harbin the line intersects with the Tangshan–Zunhua railway before crossing over a few times with the Beijing–Shanhaiguan railway. Finally, the two lines join together in Qinhuangdao to enter the Shanhaiguan District.

== Sources Cited ==
- Lee, Chae-Jin (1984). China and Japan: new economic diplomacy. Stanford: Hoover Institution. ISBN 0-8179-7972-7. "shijiusuo railway."

== See also ==
- Rail transport in China
- List of railways in China
