= Shanhaiguan railway station =

Railway station in Qinhuangdao, China

Shanhaiguan 山海关
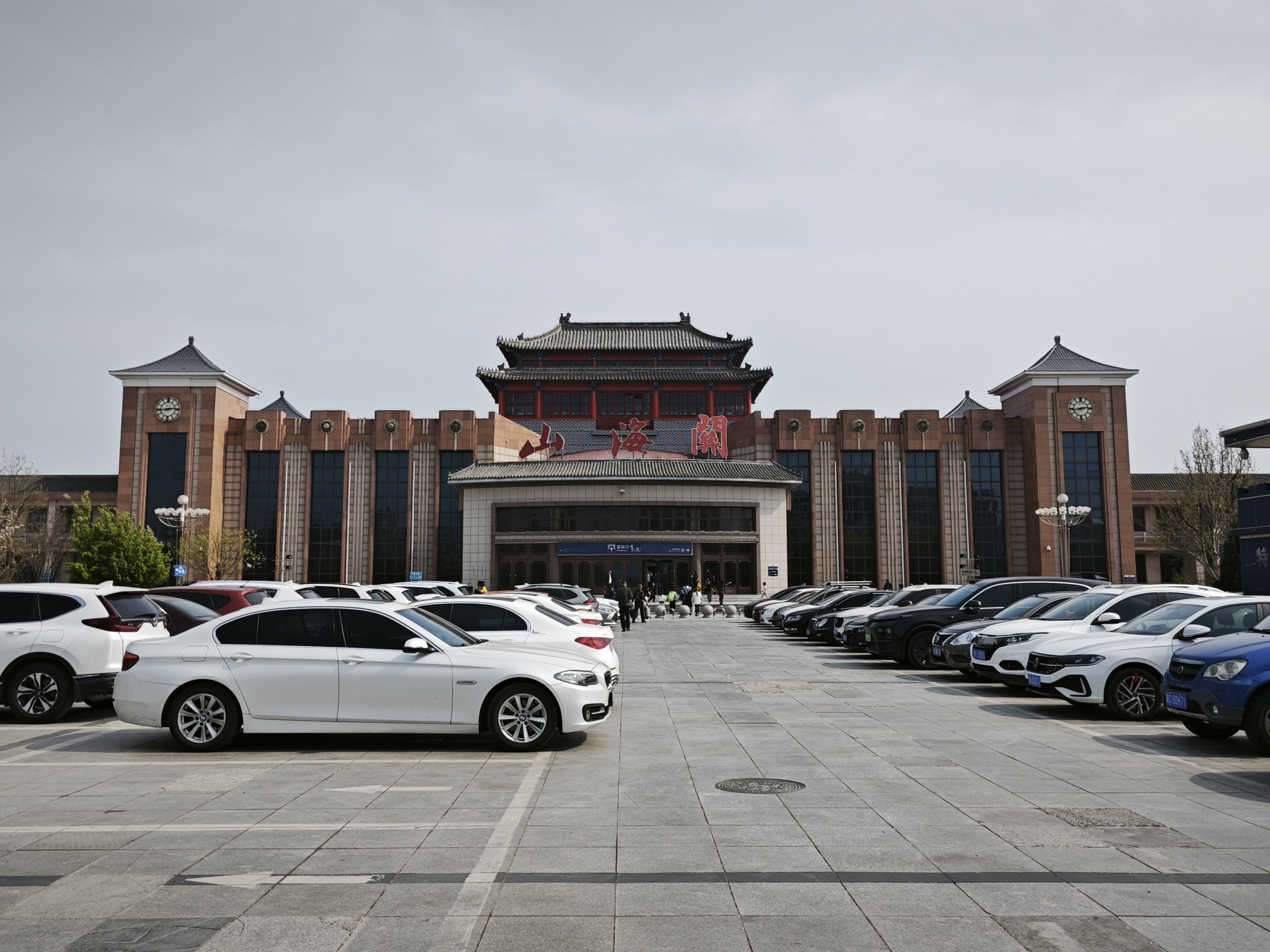
- Facade of Shanhaiguan railway station

General information
- Location: 1 Nanguan Street; Shanhaiguan District, Qinhuangdao, Hebei; China
- Coordinates: 39°59′55.99″N 119°45′42.57″E
- Operator: CR Shenyang
- Lines: Beijing–Harbin railway; Tianjin–Shanhaiguan railway; Shenyang–Shanhaiguan railway
- Platforms: 9

Other information
- Station code: 10331 (TMIS code); SHD (telegraph code); SHG (Pinyin code)
- Classification: Top Class station (特等站)

History
- Opened: June 1894
Location
- Location within Hebei Location within China

Shanhaiguan railway station (simplified Chinese: 山海关站) is a station located in Shanhaiguan district, Qinhuangdao, Hebei, China. It is an intermediate of Beijing–Harbin Railway and the start of the Shenyang–Shanhaiguan railway.

During the Dragon Boat Festival holidays, a special tourist train called Panda Express runs from Chengdu to Shanhaiguan. It is a 16-day tour package that also offers Chinese delicacies from Sichuan and Chongqing. The activities include 'Dragon Boat Festival Joy with Panda Companions'.

In April 2024, a charter tour train was also organised from Shanhaiguan station to Russia's Vladivostok. The seven day tour attracted 300 Chinese tourists.

The Beijing-Shanhaiguan Railway line also caters to Xincun subdistrict. Many trains run from this station to offer tourists a view of the section of the Great Wall.
