= Top Class station =

Top Class station is an administrative level given to stations by the Ministry of Railways of the People's Republic of China.

== Qualification Process ==
According to the PRC Regulations on Railway Technical Management, freight, marshalling or passenger rail stations would qualify as the top class if any of the following condition is true:

- A passenger station with daily passenger throughput of 60,000 and freight throughput of 20,000
- A freight station with daily passenger throughput of 750 or more trains.
- A marshalling yard with daily throughput of 6,500 transporting and working trains

In addition, for a station that has multiple roles, it would qualify as the top class if two of the following condition are true:

- daily passenger throughput of 20,000 and freight throughput of 2,500
- daily freight throughput of 400.
- daily throughput of 4,500 transporting and working trains marshalling train
- waiver for stations located at the capital, one of the direct-controlled municipalities, or a few provincial capitals.

To be classified as top class, a station needs to be nominated by its administrating railway bureau and got approval from the Ministry of Railways.

As of December 2008, there are 52 top class stations under the administration of Ministry of Railways.
