= China Railway Shenyang Group =

Chinese railway operator

China Railway Shenyang Group Co., Ltd.
- Company type: state-owned enterprise
- Industry: Railway operations
- Predecessor: Shenyang Railway Administration
- Founded: 19 November 2017
- Headquarters: 4 Taiyuan N Street, Heping, Shenyang, Liaoning, China
- Area served: Liaoning; Jilin mid-eastern Inner Mongolia
- Owner: Government of China
- Parent: China Railway
- Website: Official Website

China Railway Shenyang Group
- Simplified Chinese: 中国铁路沈阳局集团
- Traditional Chinese: 中國鐵路瀋陽局集團
Transcriptions
Standard Mandarin
- Hanyu Pinyin: Zhōngguó Tiělù Shěnyáng Jú Jítuán

Shenyang Railway Administration
- Simplified Chinese: 沈阳铁路局
- Traditional Chinese: 瀋陽鐵路局
Transcriptions
Standard Mandarin
- Hanyu Pinyin: Shěnyáng Tiělù Jú

CR Shenyang
- Simplified Chinese: 沈铁
- Traditional Chinese: 瀋鐵
Transcriptions
Standard Mandarin
- Hanyu Pinyin: Shěntiě

China Railway Shenyang Group, officially abbreviated as CR Shenyang or CR-Shenyang, formerly, Shenyang Railway Administration is a subsidiary company under the jurisdiction of the China Railway Group (formerly the Ministry of Railway). The railway administration was reorganized as a company in November 2017.

It supervises the railway network within Liaoning, Jilin, and mid-eastern Inner Mongolia.

== Adobe Flash Outage In Dalian Depot Scheduling ==
The company (as of Jan 2020) uses software based on Adobe Flash to plan dispatches in the Dalian depot. Flash's January 12 deactivation led the company reportedly to shut down for a day as the program stopped working. The issue was fixed by reverting to an older version of Flash. The company stated that no disruption of train services happened and only a couple of redundant PCs in the depot were affected, not the train schedule itself.

== Hub stations ==
- Shenyang
  - Shenyang, Shenyang West, Sujiatun
- Changchun
  - Changchun
- Dalian
  - Dalian
- Qinhuangdao
  - Shanhaiguan

== Regional services ==
=== C-train services ===
- Changhun
- Changbai — Bai'a (BCT-WWT)
- 4301/4302 Jilin-Shulan Through Train
- 6021/6022 Jilin-Harbin Through Train
