= Qinhuangdao railway station =

Railway station in Qinhuangdao, China

Qinhuangdao 秦皇岛
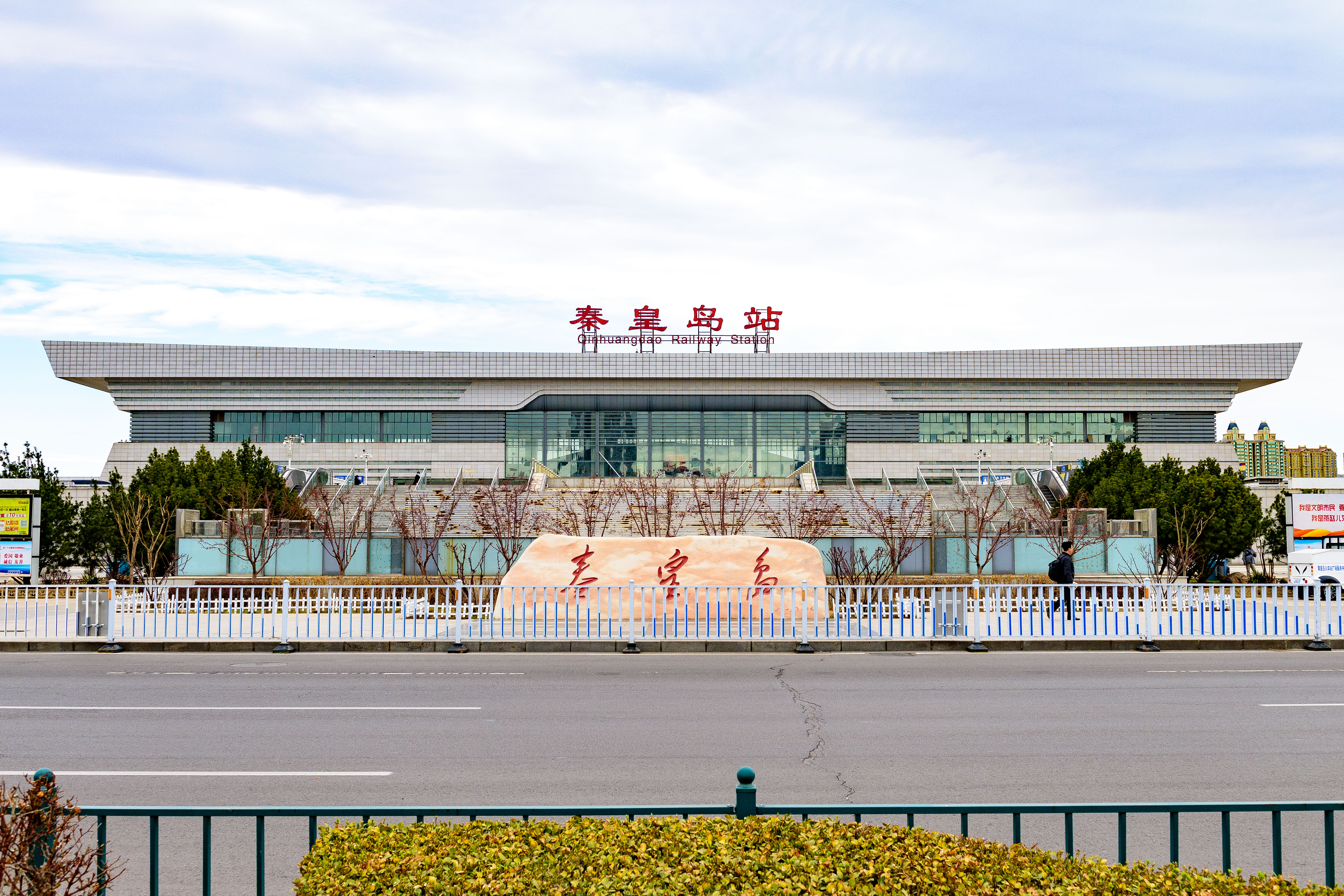
- Exterior in April 2024

General information
- Location: North Ring Road, Haigang District, Qinhuangdao, Hebei; China
- Coordinates: 39.966°N 119.591°E
- Operator: Beijing Railway Bureau, China Railway Corporation
- Lines: Beijing–Harbin Railway; Datong–Qinhuangdao Railway; Tianjin–Qinhuangdao High-Speed Railway
- Platforms: 7
- Connections

History
- Opened: September 28, 1984
Location

Qinhuangdao railway station (simplified Chinese: 秦皇岛站; traditional Chinese: 秦皇島站; pinyin: Qínhuángdǎo Zhàn) is a railway station located in the city of Qinhuangdao, in Hebei, China.

Preceding station	China Railway	Following station
Beidaihe towards Beijing	Beijing–Harbin railway	Shanhaiguan towards Harbin
Preceding station	China Railway High-speed	Following station
Terminus	Qinhuangdao–Shenyang high-speed railway Part of the Beijing–Harbin Railway	Shanhaiguan towards Shenyang
