= Shenyang railway station =

Railway station in Shenyang, China

Shenyang 沈阳
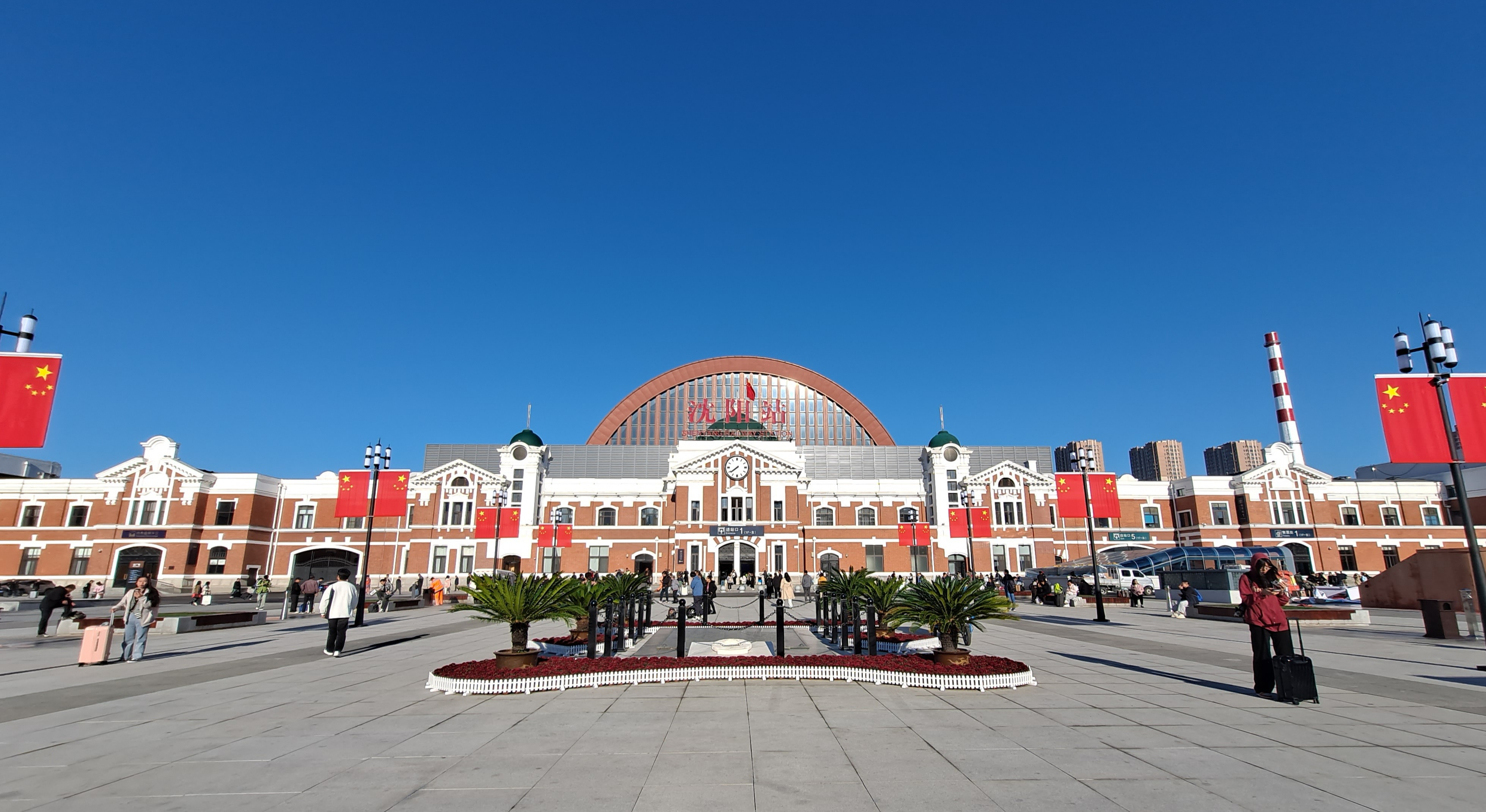
- Shenyang railway station in 2024

General information
- Location: Shengli Nanjie, Heping District, Shenyang, Liaoning; China
- Coordinates: 41°47′42″N 123°23′39″E
- Operated by: China Railway Shenyang Group, China Railway Corporation
- Lines: Shenyang–Dalian railway (沈大铁路); Shenyang–Dandong railway; Shenyang–Shanhaiguan railway (沈山铁路); Huanggutun railway; Shenyang–Fushun intercity railway (沈抚城际铁路); Harbin–Dalian high-speed railway; Beijing–Shenyang high-speed railway
- Platforms: 5
- Connections: Bus terminal

Other information
- Station code: TMIS: 53876; Telegraph: SYT; Pinyin: SYA
- Classification: Top Class station

History
- Opened: 1899
- Previous names: Fengtian station, Shenyang South station
Location

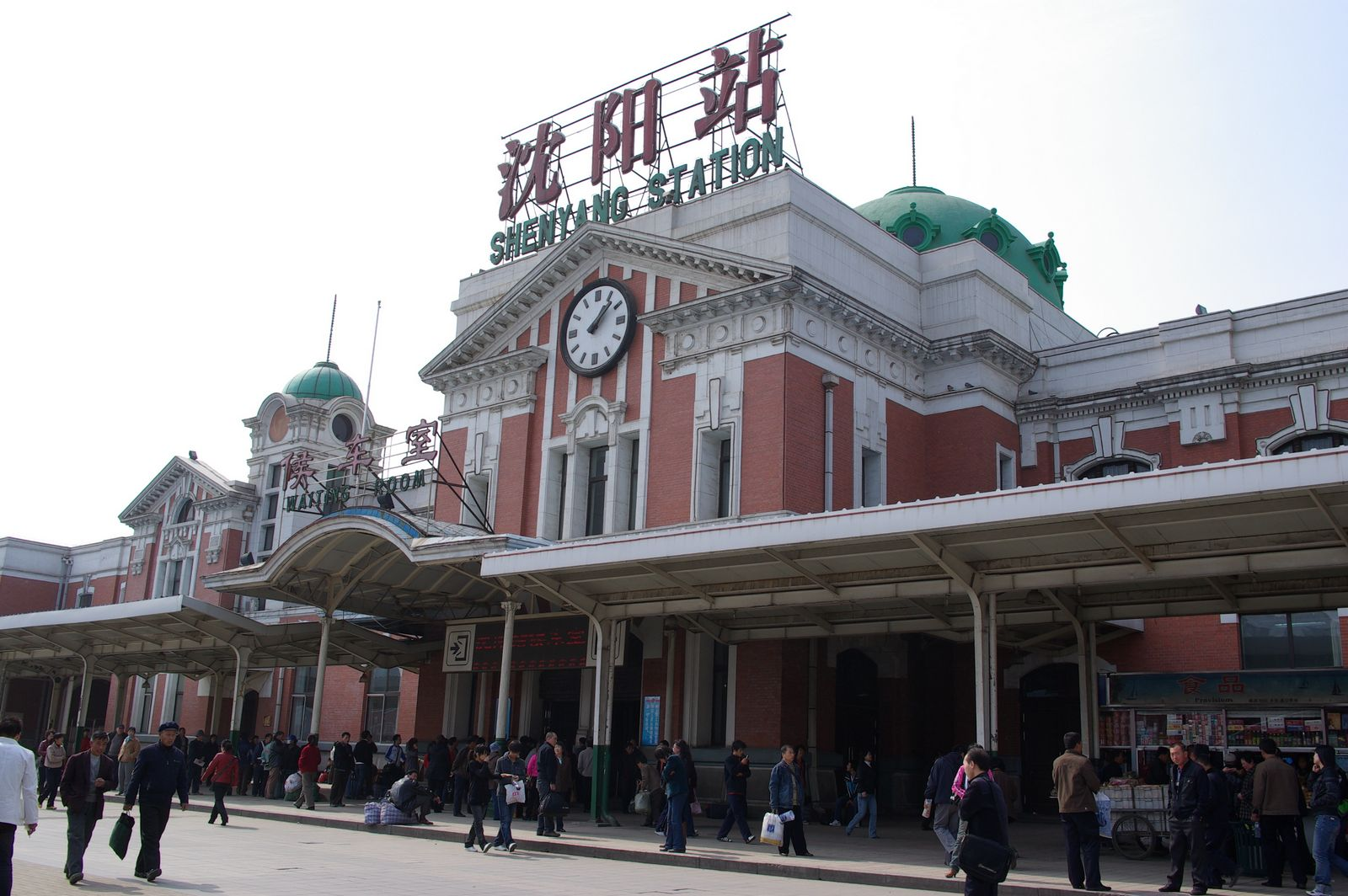
The original East Entrance built by the Chinese Eastern Railway

Shenyang railway station (simplified Chinese: 沈阳站; traditional Chinese: 瀋陽站; pinyin: Shěnyáng Zhàn) is a railway station on the Shenyang–Dalian railway, Shenyang–Dandong railway, Shenyang–Shanhaiguan railway, Huanggutun railway, Shenyang–Fushun intercity railway, Harbin–Dalian high-speed railway and Beijing–Shenyang high-speed railway. It is located in Heping District, Shenyang, Liaoning, China.

== History ==
Fengtian station (simplified Chinese: 奉天驿; traditional Chinese: 奉天驛; pinyin: Fèngtiān Yì) opened in 1899. The new station building was constructed on October 1, 1910. Fengtian station was renamed Shenyang South Station (simplified Chinese: 沈阳南站; traditional Chinese: 瀋陽南站; pinyin: Shěnyáng-nán Zhàn) in 1945 (after Second Sino-Japanese War). Shenyang South Station was renamed Shenyang Station in 1950.

The station was designed by Takeshi Ota and Sotaro Yoshida, who were both disciples of Tatsuno Kingo, the architect of Tokyo Station, making their architecture similar, characterized by their extensive use of red bricks.

== See also ==
- South Manchuria Railway
- South Manchuria Railway Zone
- Shenyang Metro
- Shenyang North railway station

Preceding station	China Railway High-speed	Following station
Shenyang West towards Beijing	Beijing–Shenyang high-speed railway Part of the Beijing–Harbin high-speed railway	Terminus
Shenyang North towards Harbin	Harbin–Dalian high-speed railway Part of the Beijing–Harbin high-speed railway	Shenyang South towards Dalian
Shenyang North Terminus	Shenyang–Dandong intercity railway	Shenyang South towards Dandong
