= Shenyang–Shanhaiguan railway =

Railway line in China

Shenyang–Shanhaiguan railway; 沈山铁路

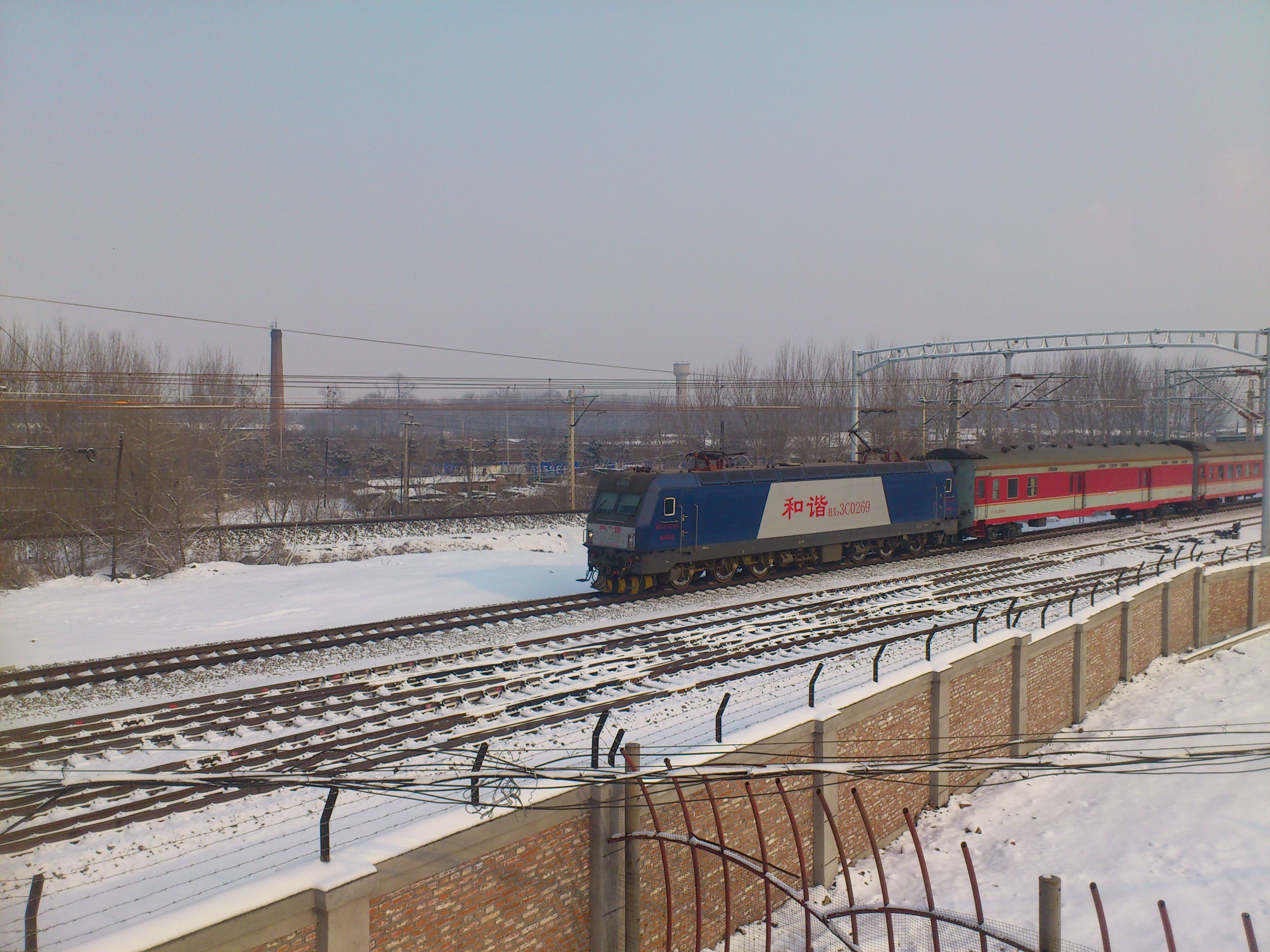
- A China Railways HXD3C car pulling passenger trains

Overview
- Status: Active
- Termini: Shanhaiguan; Shenyang

Service
- Type: Heavy rail
- Operator: China Railway

Technical
- Line length: 439.1 km (272.8 mi)
- Track gauge: 1,435 mm (4 ft 8 1/2 in) standard gauge

The Shenyang–Shanhaiguan railway (Chinese: 沈山铁路) is a railroad across Northeast and North China. It connects Shenyang and Shanhaiguan. The line has a total length of 439.1 km (272.8 mi) and passes through Hebei and Liaoning provinces. Major cities along the route include Qinhuangdao, Jinzhou, Huludao, and Shenyang.

== Line description ==
Following the Surrender of Japan, all but 30 kilometres (19 mi) of the railway had been converted to double-track. The route was electrified on 1 August 2007.

== History ==
The predecessor of the Shenyang–Shanhaiguan railway was the Peking–Mukden Railway (Chinese: 关外段). During Japanese occupation of China, it was owned by the Manchukuo National Railway. The rail was damaged during the Chinese Civil War.

== Stations ==
Shenyang–Shanhaiguan railway stations
Station	Province	Codes		
Station	Province	TMIS	Telegraph	Pinyin
Shanhaiguan	Hebei	10331	SHD	SHG
Wanjiatun	Liaoning	51551	WJD	WJT
Gaoling	Liaoning	51563	GLD	GLI
Qianwei	Liaoning	51566	QWD	QWE
Suizhong	Liaoning	51578	SZD	SZH
Dongxinzhuang	Liaoning	51581	DXD	DXZ
Shahousuo	Liaoning		SSD	SHS
Dadian	Liaoning			
Xingcheng	Liaoning	51596	XCD	XCH
Huludao	Liaoning	51608	HLD	HLD
Tashan	Liaoning			
Gaoqiaozhen	Liaoning		GZD	GQZ
Nüerhe	Liaoning	51644	NRD	NEH
Taoyuan	Liaoning	51647	TYD	TYU
Jinzhou	Liaoning	51650	JZD	JZH
Shuangyangdian	Liaoning	51707	SYD	SYD
Linghai	Liaoning	51713	JID	LHA
Hongqi	Liaoning	51719	HQD	
Shishan	Liaoning			
Goubangzi	Liaoning	51734	GBD	GBZ
Qingduizi	Liaoning	51749	QDD	QDZ
Gaoshanzi	Liaoning	51758	GSD	GSZ
Dahushan	Liaoning	51764	DHD	DHS
Tangjia	Liaoning	51788	TJD	TJI
Raoyanghe	Liaoning	51797	RHD	RYH
Dahongqi	Liaoning	51803	DQD	DHQ
Xinmin	Liaoning	51812	XMD	XMI
Gaotaishan	Liaoning	51815	GTD	GTS
Xinglongdian	Liaoning	51824	XDD	XLD
Santai	Liaoning	51827	STD	STA
Masanjia	Liaoning	51839	MJT	MSJ
Yuguo	Liaoning	51845	OXT	YGU
Yuhong	Liaoning	51932	YHT	YHO
Lanjuntun	Liaoning	51935	LTT	LJT
Shenyang	Liaoning	53876	SYT	SYA

== See also ==
- List of railways in China
