= HQD =

HQD may refer to:

- Hongqi HQD, concept car by Chinese luxury car brand Hongqi
- Mark Levinson HQD System, replay system by American brand Mark Levinson Audio Systems
- HQD, Toronto Stock Exchange symbol for HBP NASDAQ-100 Bear Plus ETF, an inverse exchange-traded fund
- HQD, telegraph code for Hongqi railway station, a station on the Shenyang–Shanhaiguan railway, China
