= Liujia Township =

Liujia Township, may refer to:

- Liujia Township, Beizhen, a township in Beizhen, Liaoning, China
- Liujia Township, Fuchuan County, a township in Fuchuan Yao Autonomous County, Guangxi, China
