= Xingcheng station =

Xingcheng station may refer to:

- Xingcheng railway station (兴城站) on the Shenyang–Shanhaiguan Railway in Xingcheng, Liaoning
- Xingcheng station (Beijing Subway) (星城站) on the Yanfang Line of the Beijing Subway
