= Jinzhou railway station =

Jinzhou Station or Jinzhou railway station may refer to the following in China:

- Jinzhou station (Guangzhou Metro) (金洲站), station of the Guangzhou Metro in Guangzhou, Guangdong
- Jinzhou railway station (Jinzhou) (锦州站), in Jinzhou, Liaoning
- Jinzhou South railway station (锦州南站), in Jinzhou, Liaoning
- Jinzhou railway station (Dalian) (金州站), in Jinzhou District, Dalian, Liaoning
