= Taoyuan station =

Taoyuan station may refer to:

- Taoyuan HSR station (高鐵桃園站), a high-speed rail and metro station in Taoyuan, Taiwan
- Taoyuan railway station (桃園車站), a railway station in Taoyuan, Taiwan
- Taoyuan railway station (Qianjiang–Changde railway) (桃源站), a station on Qianjiang–Changde railway in Changde, Hunan Province, China
- Taoyuan railway station (Shenyang-Shanhaiguan railway) (桃园站), a station on Shenyang-Shanhaiguan railway in Jinzhou, Liaoning Province, China
- Taoyuan station (Dalian Metro) (桃源站), a station on Line 5 of the Dalian Metro in Dalian, Liaoning Province, China
- Taoyuan station (Shenzhen Metro) (桃园站), a station on the Shenzhen Metro in Shenzhen, Guangdong Province, China
