= Wucheng Township =

Wucheng Township 吴家乡
- Township
- Interactive map of Wucheng Township
- Country: China
- Province: Liaoning
- Prefecture-level city: Jinzhou
- County-level city: Beizhen

Area
  - Total: 58.87 km^{2} (22.73 sq mi)

Population (2018)
  - Total: 11,569
  - Density: 196.5/km^{2} (509.0/sq mi)
- Time zone: UTC+08:00 (China Standard)

Wucheng Township (simplified Chinese: 吴家乡; traditional Chinese: 吳家鄉) is a township in Beizhen, Liaoning, China. As of the 2018 census, it had a population of 11,569 and an area of 58.87 square kilometres.

== Administrative division ==
As of 2020, the township is divided into six villages:

- Wu Jia (吴家村)
- Pan She (盘蛇村)
- Dong Xing (东兴村)
- He Xing (合兴村)
- Xu Yao (徐姚村)
- Gao Tai Zi (高台子村)
