= Goubangzi railway station =

Railway station in Beizhen, China

Coordinates: 41°21′49″N 121°46′9″E

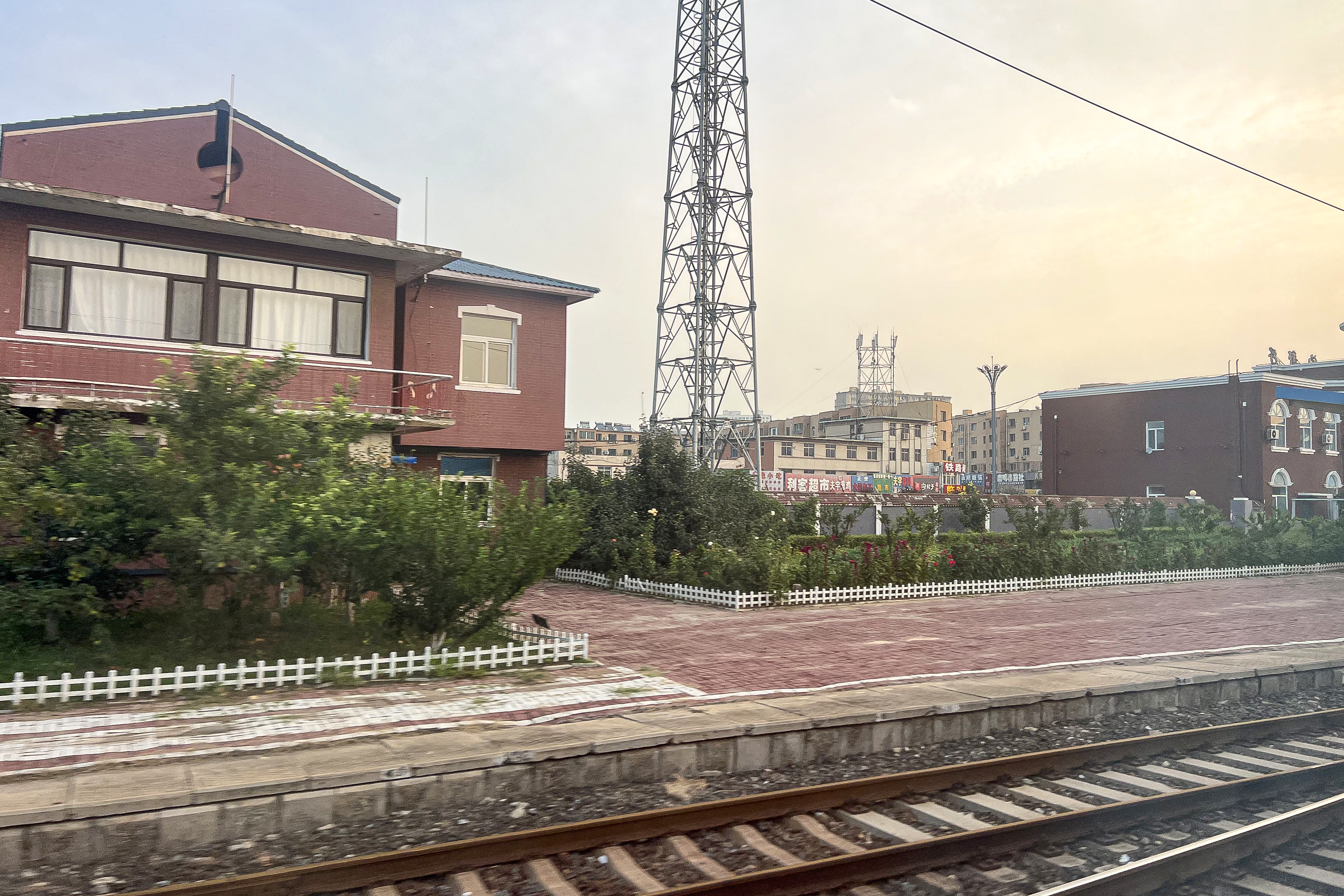
Goubangzi railway station

Goubangzi railway station (simplified Chinese: 沟帮子站; traditional Chinese: 溝幫子站) is a third-class train station located in the town of Goubangzi, Beizhen, Jinzhou, Liaoning, China on the Beijing–Harbin railway. It was built in 1899, and it is under the jurisdiction of China Railway Shenyang Group.

Preceding station	China Railway	Following station
Jinzhou towards Beijing	Beijing–Harbin railway	Dahushan towards Harbin
