= Luancheng Subdistrict =

Subdistrict in Luanzhou, Hebei Province, China

Coordinates: 39°44′54″N 118°41′29″E

Luancheng Subdistrict (t 灤城街道, s 滦城街道, p Luánchéng, postal Lanchou) is a subdistrict in Luanzhou, Hebei Province, China.

It was connected to the China Railway Company's network in 1892 and was involved in the First Zhili–Fengtian War during China's Warlord era.

== See also ==
- List of township-level divisions of Hebei
