= Beizhen Catholic Church =

- 北镇天主教堂
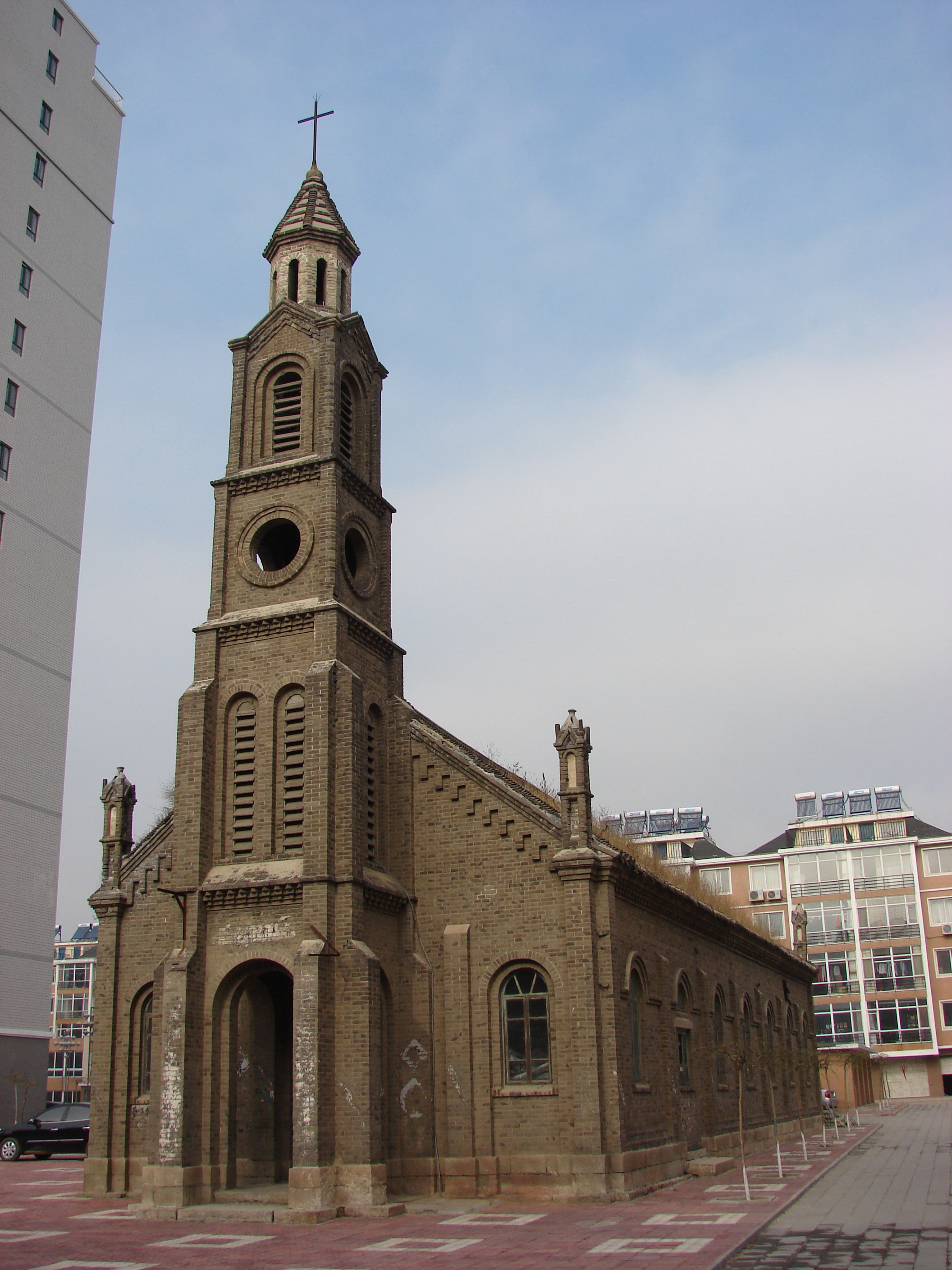
- Beizhen Catholic Church in 2010

- Location in Liaoning
- 41°35′48″N 121°47′40″E
- Location: Beizhen, Liaoning, China
- Denomination: Roman Catholic

History
- Status: Parish church
- Founded: 1886
- Founder: Yi Ruohan

Architecture
- Functional status: Active
- Architectural type: Church building

Specifications
- Materials: Granite

Chinese name
- Simplified Chinese: 北镇天主教堂
- Traditional Chinese: 北鎮天主教堂
Transcriptions
Standard Mandarin
- Hanyu Pinyin: Běizhèn Tiānzhǔ Jiàotáng

The Beizhen Catholic Church (Chinese: 北镇天主教堂) is a Roman Catholic church in Beizhen, Liaoning, China. It is part of the Archdiocese of Shenyang.

== History ==
The church was originally built by French missionary Yi Ruohan (亿若翰) in 1886.

In October 2014, it was inscribed as provincial cultural relic preservation organ by the Liaoning government.

== Architecture ==
The church is located in the north and faces the south. It is 24-metre (79 ft) long from north to south and 9.4-metre (31 ft) wide from east to west, covering a total area of 3,300-square-metre (36,000 sq ft).
