= Tangjiazhuang Subdistrict =

Tangjiazhuang Subdistrict 唐家庄街道
- Subdistrict
- Location within Hebei
- Coordinates: 39°44′01″N 118°26′46″E
- Country: China
- Provinces of China: Hebei
- Prefecture-level City: Tangshan
- District: Guye District

Population (2010)
  - Total: 53,212

Tangjiazhuang Subdistrict (simplified Chinese: 唐家庄街道; traditional Chinese: 唐家莊街道; pinyin: Tángjiāzhuāng Jiēdào) is a subdistrict in Guye District, in the city of Tangshan, Hebei, China.

== History ==
On December 12, 2010, Donglian Community (Chinese: 东联社区) and Qiaobei Community (Chinese: 桥北社区) were moved from Tangjiazhuang Subdistrict to the bordering town of Beijiadian.

== Administrative divisions ==
Tangjiazhuang Subdistrict administers the following 11 residential communities (Chinese: 社区; pinyin: Shèqū):

- Jinghuadongli Community (Chinese: 京华东里社区)
- Xibeilou Community (Chinese: 西北楼社区)
- Jinghuaxili Community (Chinese: 京华西里社区)
- Xin'anlou Community (Chinese: 新安楼社区)
- Xingongcun Community (Chinese: 新工村社区)
- Mofanlou Community (Chinese: 模范楼社区)
- Donggongfang Community (Chinese: 东工房社区)
- Xinhualou Community (Chinese: 新华楼社区)
- Xixing Community (Chinese: 西兴社区)
- Tielu Community (Chinese: 铁路社区; lit. 'Railroad Community')
- Dongxing Community (Chinese: 东兴社区)

== Demographics ==
Per the 2010 Chinese Census, Tangjiazhuang Subdistrict had a population of 53,212. This is down from the 60,269 recorded in the 2000 Chinese Census. A 2005 population estimate put the subdistrict's population at 79,100.
