= Datun Township, Beizhen =

Datun Township 大屯乡
- Township
- Country: China
- Province: Liaoning
- Prefecture-level city: Jinzhou
- County-level city: Beizhen

Area
  - Total: 48.75 km^{2} (18.82 sq mi)

Population (2019)
  - Total: 15,410
  - Density: 316.1/km^{2} (818.7/sq mi)
- Time zone: UTC+08:00 (China Standard)

Datun Township (simplified Chinese: 大屯乡; traditional Chinese: 大屯鄉) is a township in Beizhen, Liaoning. China. As of the 2019 census it had a population of 15,410 and an area of 48.75 square kilometres.

== Administrative division ==
As of 2023, the township is divided into ten villages:

- Datun (大屯村)
- Haotun (郝屯村)
- Xiaozhaotun (小赵屯村)
- Ertaizi (二台子村)
- Xiaogujiazi (小孤家子村)
- Shuiquanzi (水泉子村)
- Lifo (李佛村)
- Yaosanjiazi (腰三家子村)
- Fengtun (冯屯村)
- Chepaozi (车堡子村)

== Geography ==
The western part of Datun Township has a small number of hills, while the majority is plains, with an average elevation of 30 meters above sea level.
