= Shanhai =

Shanhai may refer to:

- Shanhai Pass, pass of the Great Wall of China
- Shanhai Jing, or Collection of the Mountains and Seas, Chinese classic text

== See also ==
- Shanghai
