= Liujia Township, Beizhen =

Liujia Township 柳家乡
- Township
- Location in Liaoning
- Coordinates: 41°29′59″N 122°07′14″E
- Country: China
- Province: Liaoning
- Prefecture-level city: Jinzhou
- County-level city: Beizhen

Area
  - Total: 60.24 km^{2} (23.26 sq mi)

Population (2017)
  - Total: 11,146
  - Density: 185.0/km^{2} (479.2/sq mi)
- Time zone: UTC+08:00 (China Standard)
- Postal code: 121313
- Area code: 0416

Liujia Township (simplified Chinese: 柳家乡; traditional Chinese: 柳家鄉; pinyin: Liǔjiā Xiāng) is a township in Beizhen, Liaoning, China. As of the 2017 census it had a population of 11,146 and an area of 60.24-square-kilometre (23.26 sq mi).

== Administrative division ==
As of 2016, the township is divided into eight villages:

- Liudong (柳东村)
- Dongqingduizi (东青堆子村)
- Shuangjia (双家村)
- Bajiazi (八家子村)
- Guanyingzi (官营子村)
- Liujia (柳家村)
- Yuzhou (宇宙村)
- Xinfeng (新风村)

== Geography ==
The Dongsha Stream (东沙河) and Raoyang Stream (绕阳河) flow through the town.

== Economy ==
The economy of the township has a predominantly agricultural orientation, including farming and pig-breeding. Agricultural crops include corn, sorghum, soybean, rice, vegetable, grape, and peach.

== Transportation ==
The Provincial Highway S210 passes across the township.
