= Goubangzi =

Goubangzi Town
- town

Chinese transcription(s)
  - Simplified: 沟帮子镇
  - Traditional: 溝幫子鎮
  - Pinyin: Gōubāngzǐ Zhèn
- Location within Liaoning
- Coordinates: 41°22′18″N 121°46′18″E
- Country: China
- Province: Liaoning
- Prefecture-level city: Jinzhou
- county-level city: Beizhen

Area
  - Total: 320.59 km^{2} (123.78 sq mi)

Population
  - Total: 80,000
  - Density: 250/km^{2} (650/sq mi)
- Time zone: UTC+8 (China Standard)
- Postal code: 121308
- Area code: +0086 0416

Goubangzi (Note: Chinese: t 溝幫子, s 沟帮子, p Gōubāngzǐ, postal Koupangtzu.) is a town in Beizhen, Liaoning Province, China.

It is located on the modern Beijing–Harbin Railway. It was an important rail junction in the late 19th century, with several spurs connecting to the mainline at the station.

== See also ==
- Goubangzi station
