= Dahushan railway station =

Railway station in Jinzhou, Liaoning, China

Coordinates: 41°36′40.468″N 122°8′35.192″E

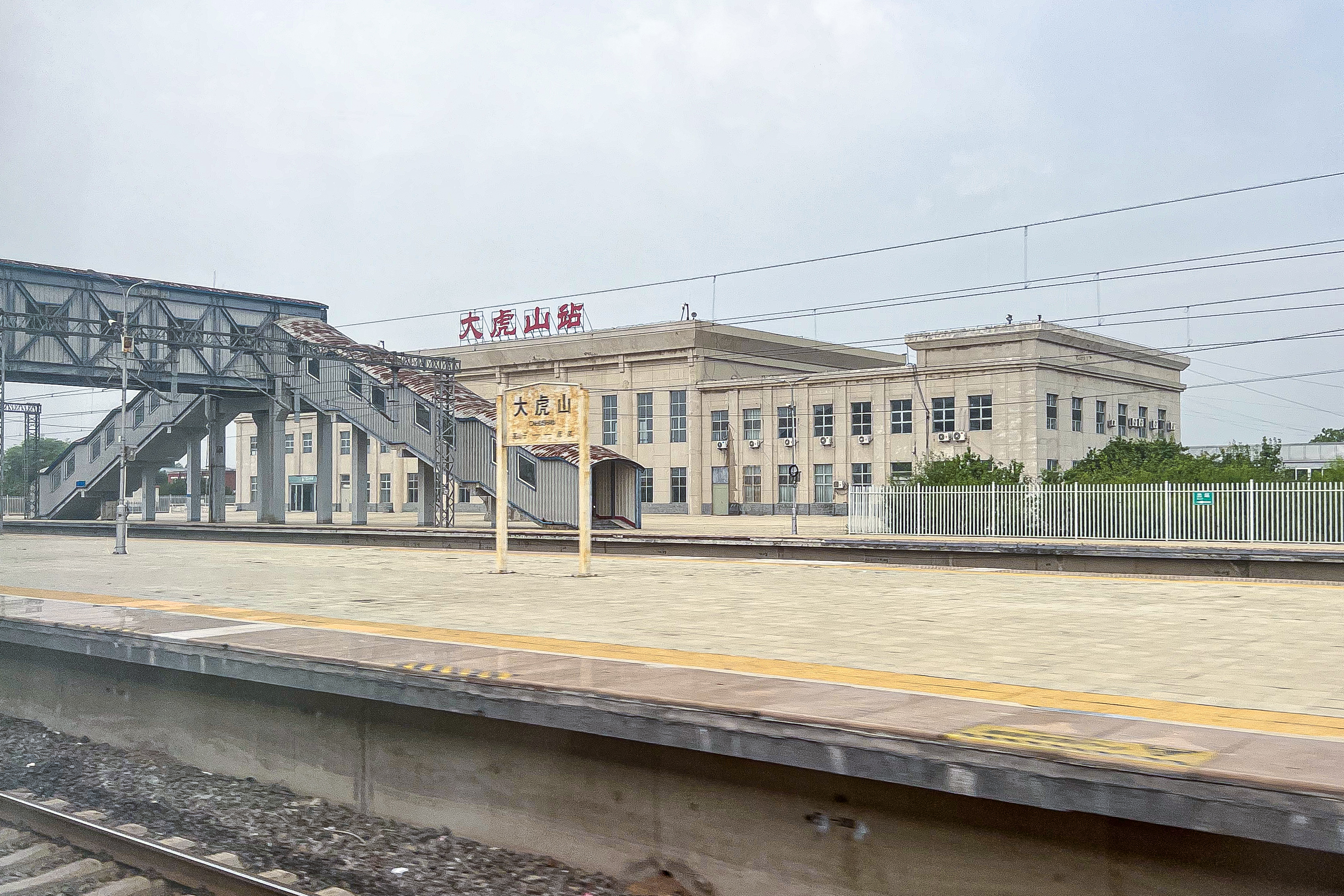
Platform in 2025

Dahushan railway station (Chinese: 大虎山站) is a railway station in the town of Dahushan, Heishan County, Jinzhou, Liaoning, China. It is on the Beijing–Harbin railway and Dahushan–Zhengjiatun railway.

Preceding station	Jingha railway	Following station
Goubangzi	China Railway Jingha railway	Shenyang North

== See also ==
- Paozi railway station
