= Beizhen =

Beizhen 北镇市
- County-level city
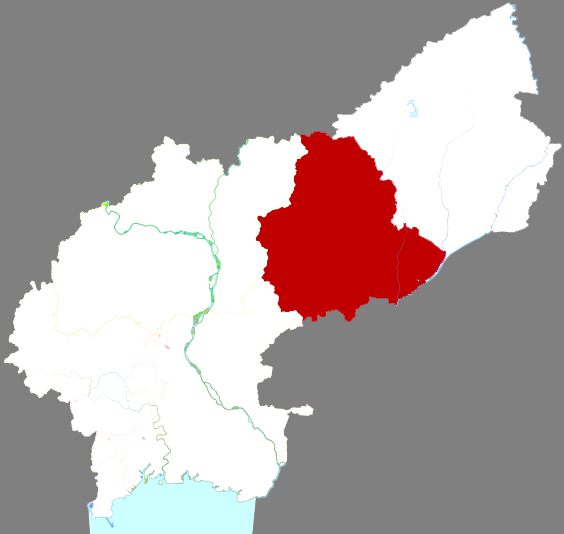
- Location in Jinzhou

- Location in Liaoning
- Coordinates: 41°36′N 121°48′E
- Country: People's Republic of China
- Province: Liaoning
- Prefecture-level city: Jinzhou

Area
  - County-level city: 1,782.0 km^{2} (688.0 sq mi)
  - Urban: 78.80 km^{2} (30.42 sq mi)
- Elevation: 64 m (210 ft)

Population (2020)
  - County-level city: 422,289
  - Density: 236.97/km^{2} (613.76/sq mi)
  - Urban: 152,033
- Time zone: UTC+8 (China Standard)

Beizhen (simplified Chinese: 北镇; traditional Chinese: 北鎭; pinyin: Běizhèn) is a city in west-central Liaoning province of Northeast China. It is under the administration of Jinzhou City.

== History ==
In 1123, the Jin Dynasty set Guangning County (Chinese: 廣寧縣) in nowadays Beizhen. In Ming Dynasty, the town of Guangning became a base of the Ming troops in Liaotung and a prosperous border trading center. In 1913, the name was changed to Beizhen, which is an alternative name of the Yiwulü Mountain, literally meaning "the guarding mountain of the North". In 1995, Beizhen County became Beining City (北寧市), the name of which is later changed to the current name.

In 1898, a missionary established the Beizhen Catholic Church, which is still in use and in 2014 was designated a provincial cultural relic of Liaoning.

== Administrative divisions ==
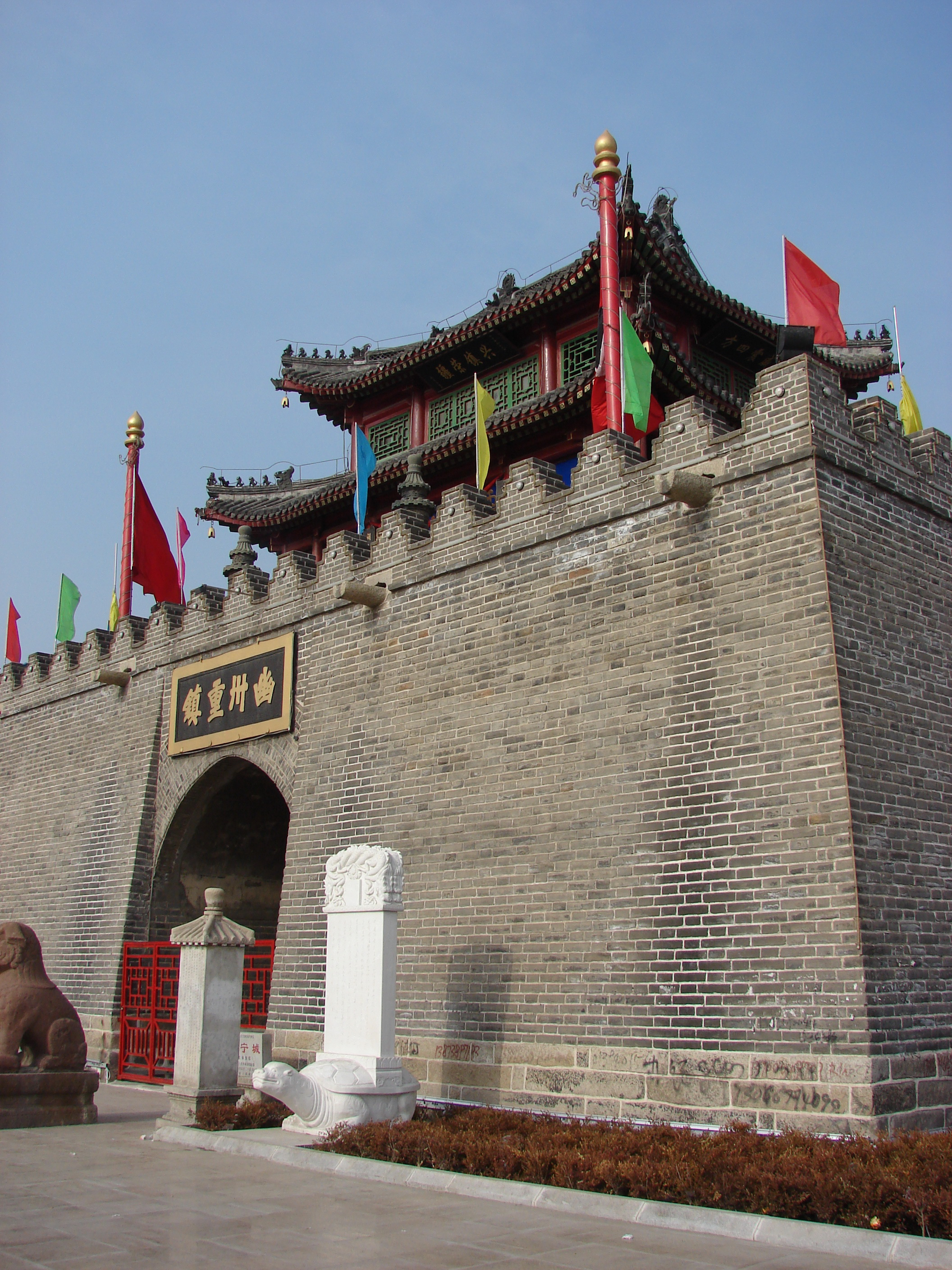
Drum Tower of Beizhen

There are three subdistricts, 14 towns, and six townships under the city's administration.

Subdistricts:

- Beizhen Subdistrict (北镇街道), Guangning Subdistrict (广宁街道), Guanyin'ge Subdistrict (观音阁街道)

Towns:

- Dashi (大市镇), Zheng'an (正安镇), Zhong'an (中安镇), Luoluobao (罗罗堡镇), Changxingdian (常兴店镇), Lüyang (闾阳镇), Goubangzi (沟帮子镇), Liaotun (廖屯镇), Qingduizi (青堆子镇), Gaoshanzi (高山子镇), Zhaotun (赵屯镇)

Townships:

- Futun Township (富屯乡), Baojia Township (鲍家乡), Datun Township (大屯乡), Liujia Township (柳家乡), Wucheng Township (吴家乡), Liaocheng Township, Beizhen (辽城乡)

== Climate ==
Climate data for Beizhen, elevation 114 m (374 ft), (1991–2020 normals, extremes 1991–present)
Month	Jan	Feb	Mar	Apr	May	Jun	Jul	Aug	Sep	Oct	Nov	Dec	Year
Record high °C (°F)	9.3 (48.7)	15.3 (59.5)	22.3 (72.1)	32.1 (89.8)	35.4 (95.7)	38.2 (100.8)	37.5 (99.5)	36.2 (97.2)	34.1 (93.4)	30.1 (86.2)	21.0 (69.8)	12.5 (54.5)	38.2 (100.8)
Mean daily maximum °C (°F)	−3.0 (26.6)	1.1 (34.0)	8.0 (46.4)	16.8 (62.2)	23.6 (74.5)	26.9 (80.4)	28.7 (83.7)	28.5 (83.3)	24.7 (76.5)	16.9 (62.4)	6.4 (43.5)	−1.2 (29.8)	14.8 (58.6)
Daily mean °C (°F)	−8.4 (16.9)	−4.4 (24.1)	2.4 (36.3)	10.8 (51.4)	17.7 (63.9)	21.9 (71.4)	24.5 (76.1)	23.8 (74.8)	18.9 (66.0)	11.1 (52.0)	1.3 (34.3)	−6.2 (20.8)	9.4 (49.0)
Mean daily minimum °C (°F)	−12.8 (9.0)	−9.1 (15.6)	−2.5 (27.5)	5.4 (41.7)	12.1 (53.8)	17.2 (63.0)	20.7 (69.3)	19.8 (67.6)	13.7 (56.7)	5.9 (42.6)	−3.1 (26.4)	−10.4 (13.3)	4.7 (40.5)
Record low °C (°F)	−27.3 (−17.1)	−23.2 (−9.8)	−13.6 (7.5)	−5.4 (22.3)	3.5 (38.3)	7.0 (44.6)	14.2 (57.6)	10.1 (50.2)	3.5 (38.3)	−5.2 (22.6)	−16.8 (1.8)	−22.7 (−8.9)	−27.3 (−17.1)
Average precipitation mm (inches)	2.6 (0.10)	3.2 (0.13)	8.2 (0.32)	26.2 (1.03)	52.6 (2.07)	88.3 (3.48)	172.4 (6.79)	142.6 (5.61)	44.5 (1.75)	29.6 (1.17)	13.9 (0.55)	2.8 (0.11)	586.9 (23.11)
Average precipitation days (≥ 0.1 mm)	1.8	1.9	3.2	5.3	8.1	10.5	10.7	9.8	5.9	5.0	3.2	2.0	67.4
Average snowy days	2.4	2.8	2.5	0.7	0	0	0	0	0	0.2	2.5	2.5	13.6
Average relative humidity (%)	48	46	43	45	52	68	79	77	64	56	52	50	57
Mean monthly sunshine hours	209.0	205.7	247.4	244.1	271.6	229.5	202.5	223.7	237.6	225.0	187.8	189.9	2,673.8
Percentage possible sunshine	70	68	67	61	60	51	44	53	64	66	64	67	61
Source: China Meteorological Administration October all-time Record
