= Guye, Tangshan =

Guye District 古冶区
- District
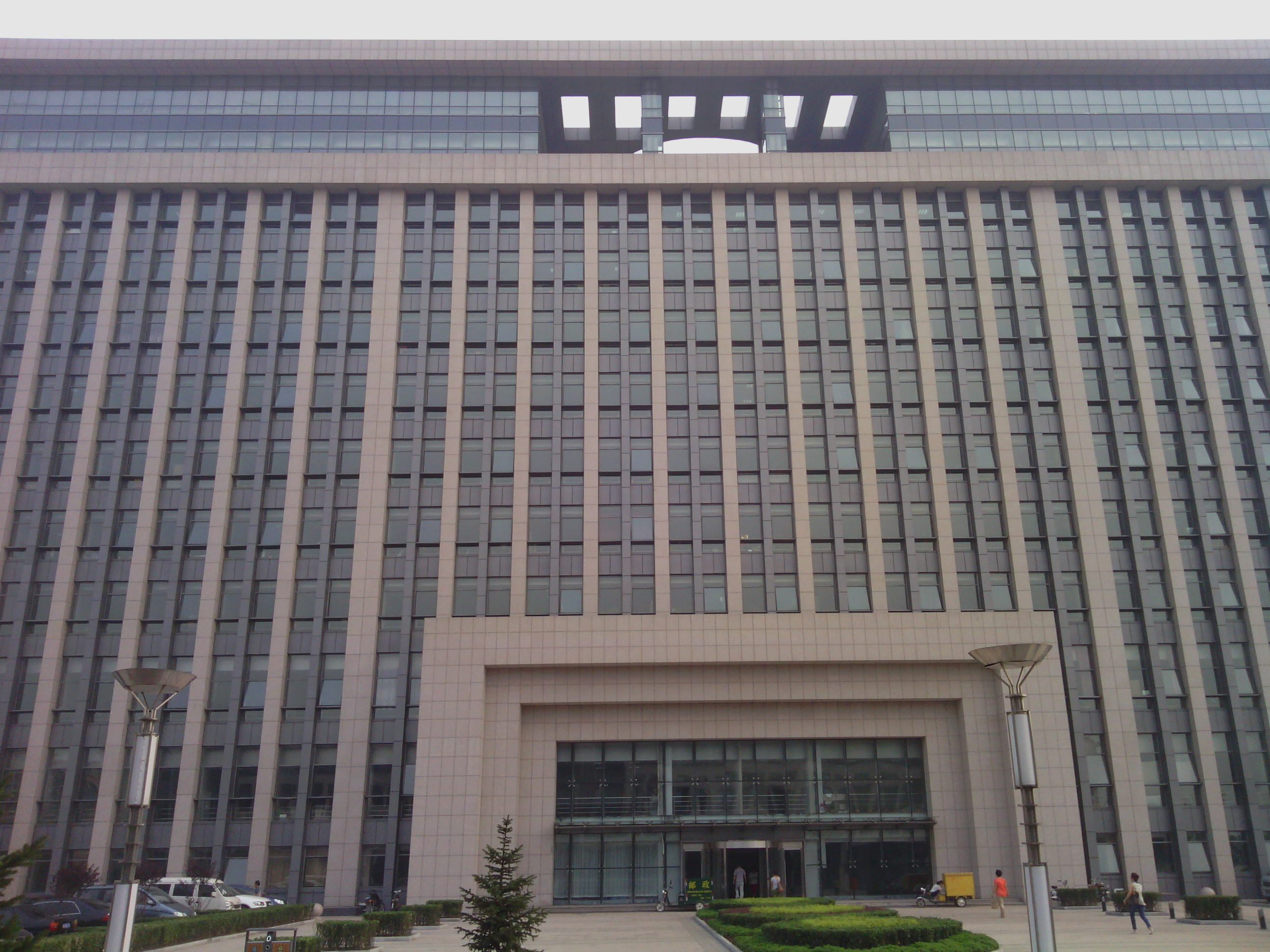
- The seat of the Guye District People's Government

- Location in Hebei
- Coordinates: 39°44′02″N 118°26′53″E
- Country: People's Republic of China
- Province: Hebei
- Prefecture-level city: Tangshan

Area
  - Total: 249 km^{2} (96 sq mi)

Population (2010)
  - Total: 358,461
  - Density: 1,440/km^{2} (3,730/sq mi)
- Time zone: UTC+8 (China Standard)

Guye District (Chinese: 古冶区; pinyin: Gǔyě Qū) is a district of the city of Tangshan, Hebei province, China. The district is located approximately 28 kilometres (17 mi) to the east of Tangshan's urban center. Guye District spans an area of 249 square kilometres (96 mi^{2}), and has a population of 358,461 per the 2010 Chinese Census.

== History ==
Prior to 1950, the area was governed by nearby Luan County (Chinese: 滦县; pinyin: Luán Xiàn), now Luanzhou. In 1950, it was formed as Tangshan District Seven (Chinese: 唐山市第七区; pinyin: Tángshān Shì Dì Qī Qū).

In 1955, the area was reorganized as East Mining District (Chinese: 东矿区; pinyin: Dōng Kuàng Qū).

In 1995, the area was reorganized as Guye District, which it remains today.

On July 12, 2020, the district was the epicenter of a Magnitude 5.1 earthquake. There were no fatalities.

== Geography ==
Guye District is located approximately 28 kilometres (17 mi) to the east of Tangshan's urban center. The northern portion of the district has a relatively higher elevation, which the southern portion is relatively lower.

=== Climate ===
Guye District experiences an average annual precipitation of 590 millimetres (23 in), and an average temperature of 10 °C (50 °F).

== Administrative divisions ==
Guye District administers five subdistricts, two towns, and three townships.

=== Subdistricts ===
Guye District administers the following five subdistricts:

- Linxi Subdistrict (林西街道)
- Tangjiazhuang Subdistrict (唐家庄街道)
- Guye Subdistrict (古冶街道)
- Zhaogezhuang Subdistrict (赵各庄街道)
- Jinghua Subdistrict

=== Towns ===
Guye District administers the following two towns:

- Fangezhuang (范各庄镇)
- Beijiadian (卑家店镇)

=== Townships ===
Guye District administers the following three townships:

- Wangnianzhuang Township (王辇庄乡)
- Xijiatao Township (习家套乡)
- Dazhuangtuo Township (大庄坨乡)

== Demographics ==
The district had a population of 358,461 per the 2010 Chinese Census, down from the 383,209 recorded in the 2000 Chinese Census. A 1996 estimate put Guye District's population at approximately 382,000.

== Economy ==
Guye District is home to a significant mining industry. Major mineral deposits in the district include coal, refractory clay, quartz sandstone, dolomite, various types of limestone, and illite. Major mines are located in Linxi Subdistrict, Zhaogezhuang Subdistrict, and Fangezhuang. Kailuan Group mines coal in the district.

== Transport ==
The Beijing–Harbin railway passes through Guye District, as does National Highway 205.
