= Xinmin railway station =

Railway station in Xinliu Subdistrict, People's Republic of China

Coordinates: 41.999963°N 122.81211°E

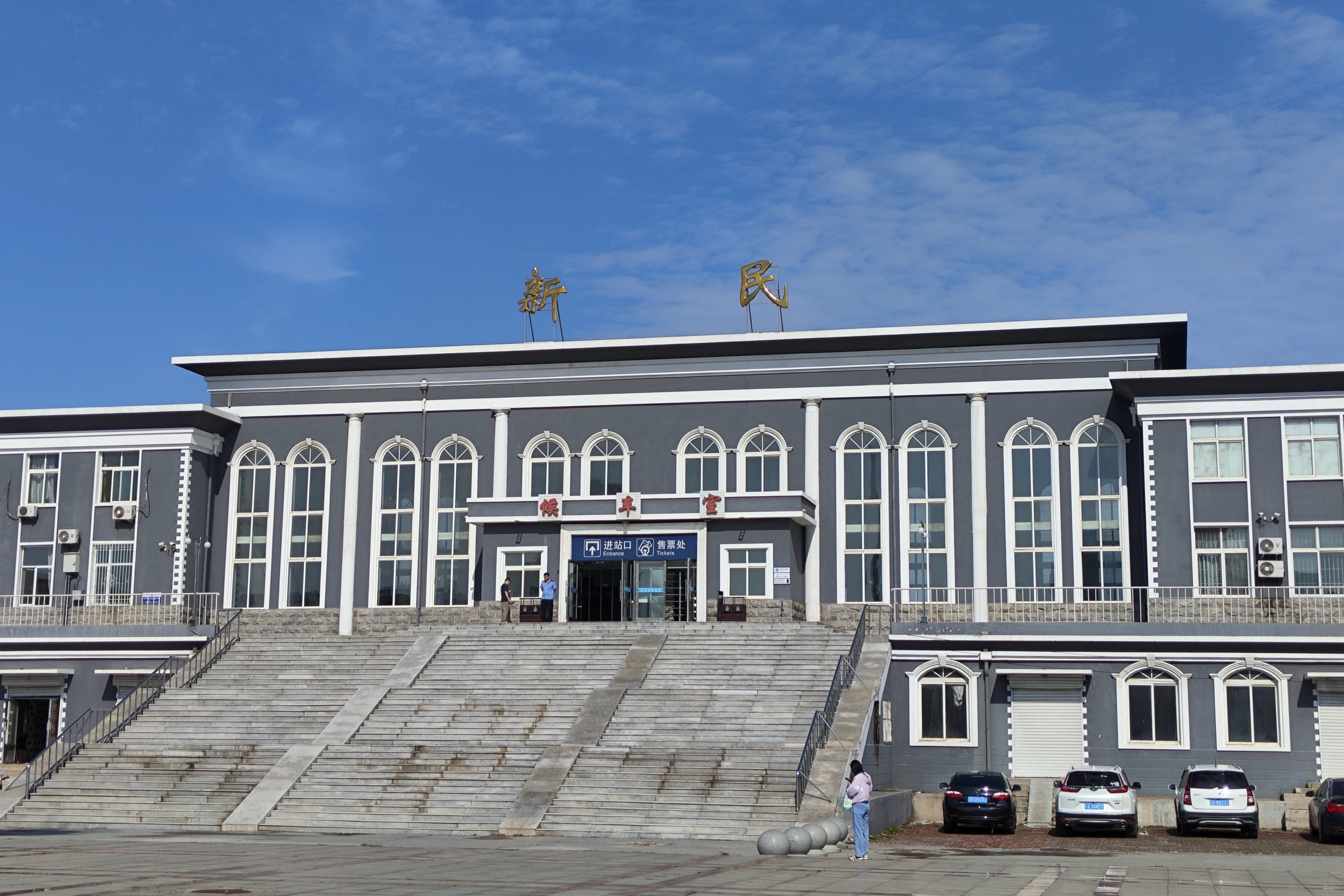
Xinmin Railway Station

The Xinmin railway station (Chinese: 新民火车站) is a railway station in Xinmin, Liaoning, China. The station is served by the Beijing-Harbin Railway, a passenger railway that passes between Beijing and Harbin.
