= Paozi railway station =

Railway station in Fuxin, China

Coordinates: 42.2057°N 122.3240°E

Paozi railway station (Chinese: 泡子站; pinyin: Pàozi zhàn) is a rather small fourth-class railway station in Paozi Town, Fuxin Mongol Autonomous County, Fuxin, Liaoning, China on the Dahushan-Zhengjiatun railway. It was founded in 1927. During the Liaoshen campaign, many of the supplies brought to the Communist troops went through Paozi station.
