= Luanzhou =

Luanzhou 滦州市
- County-level city
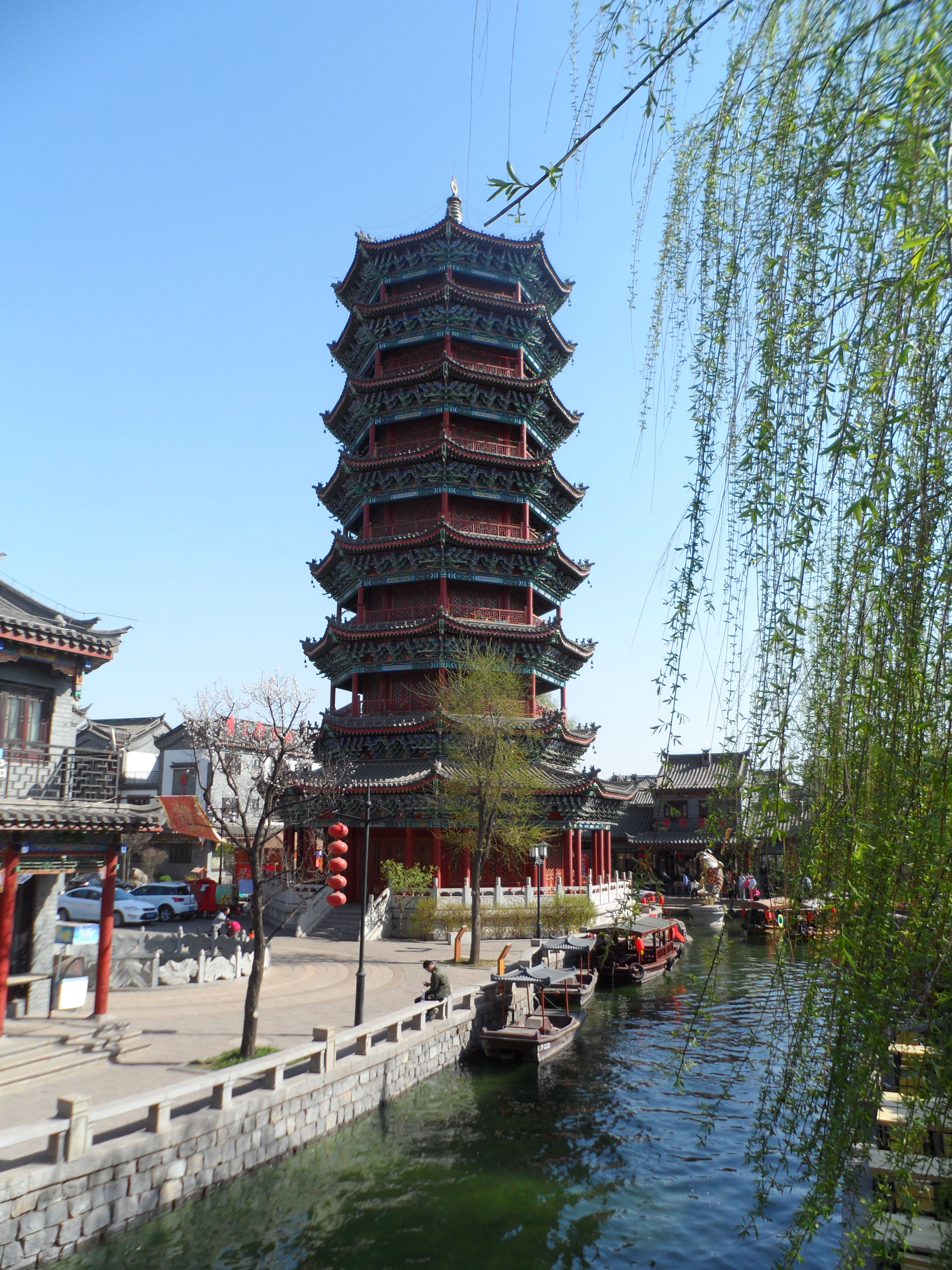
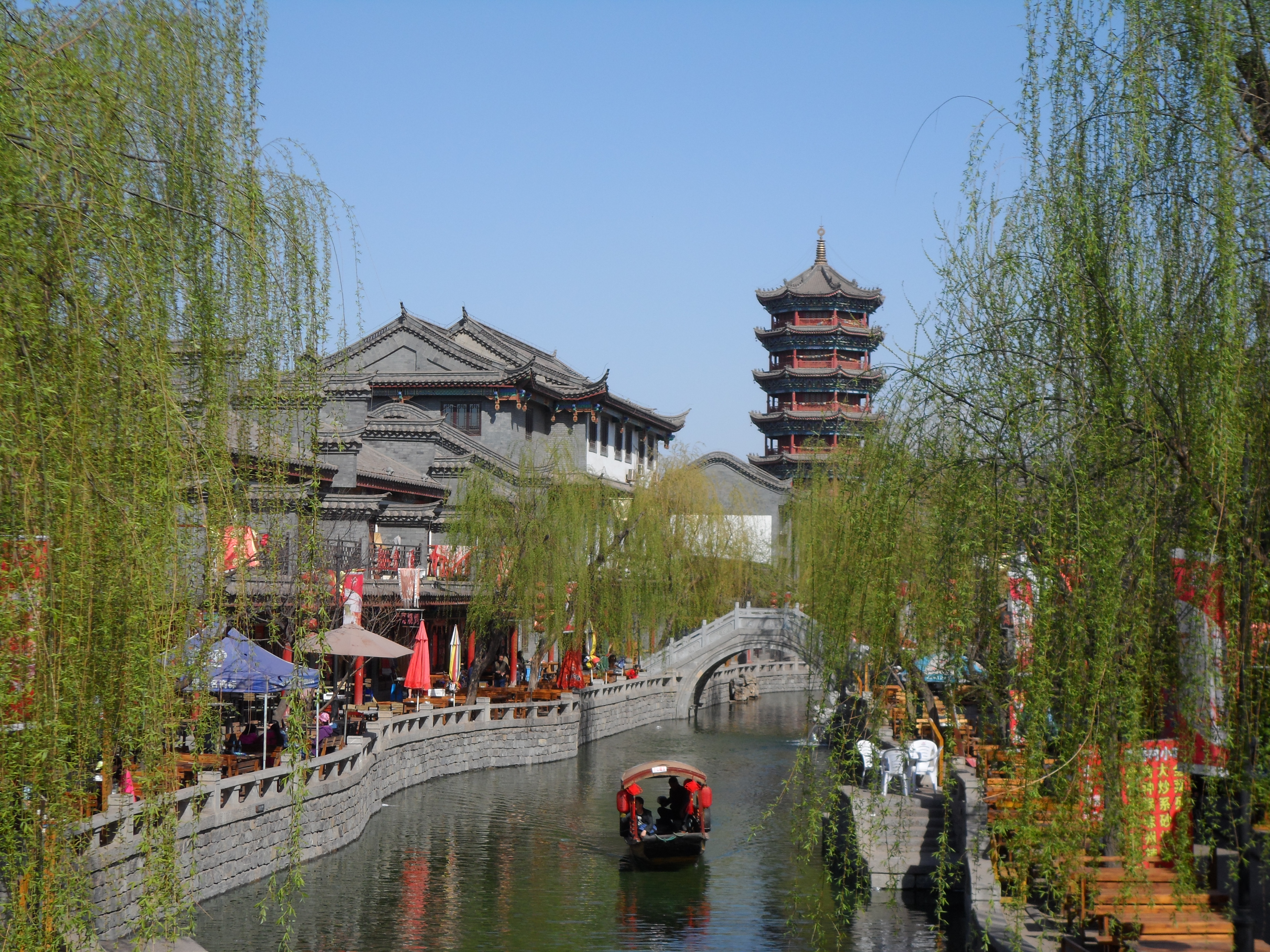
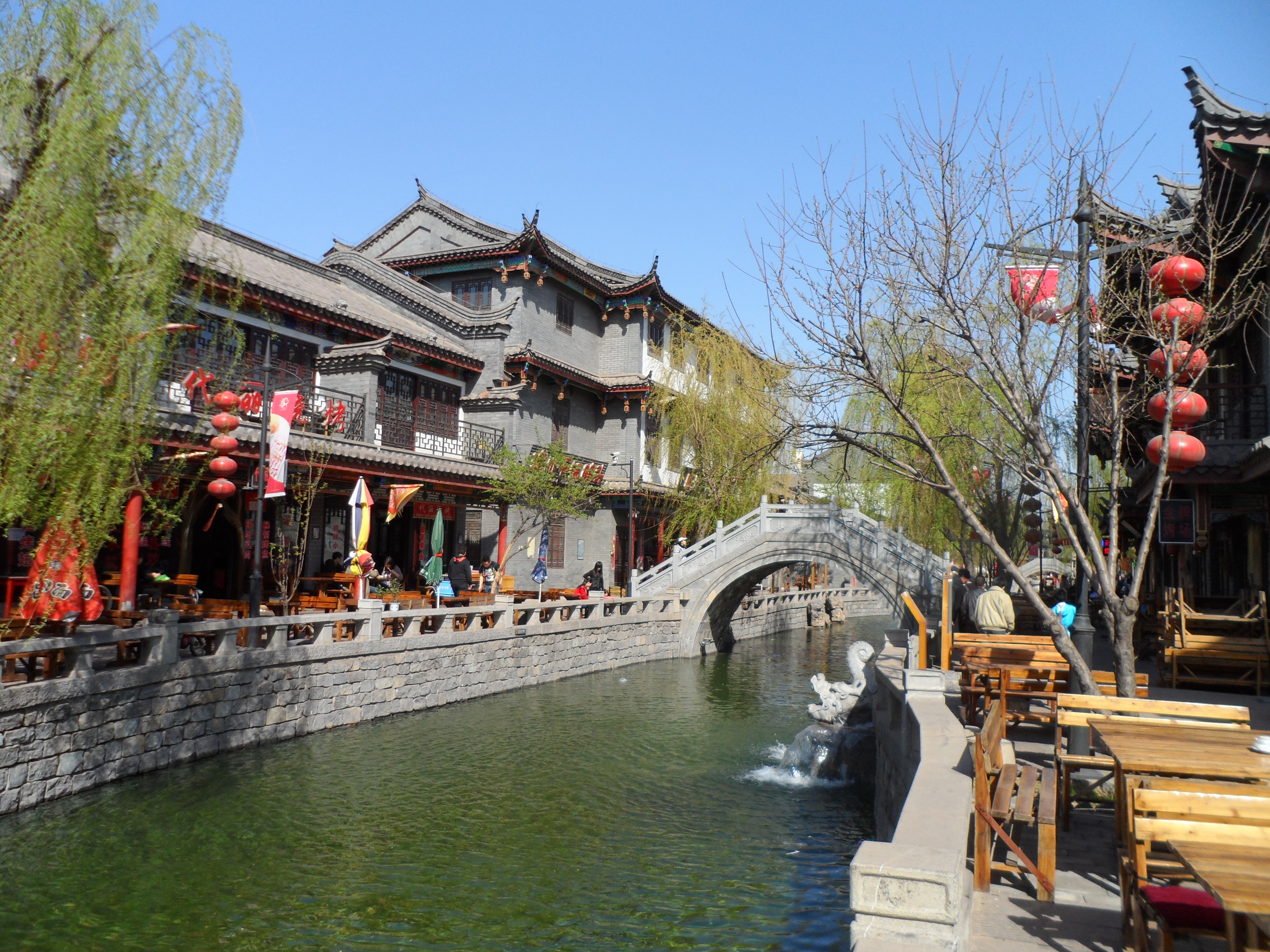
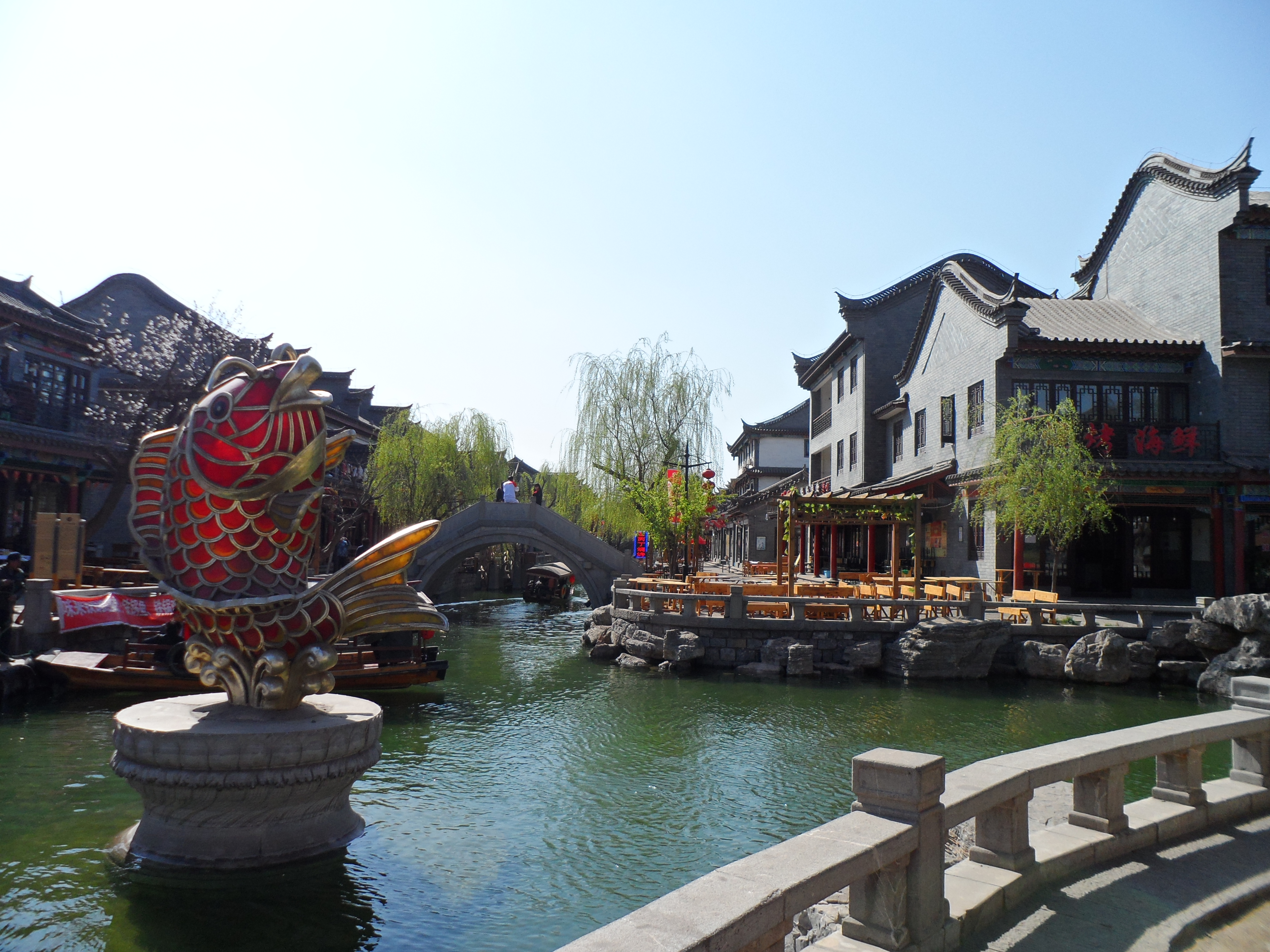
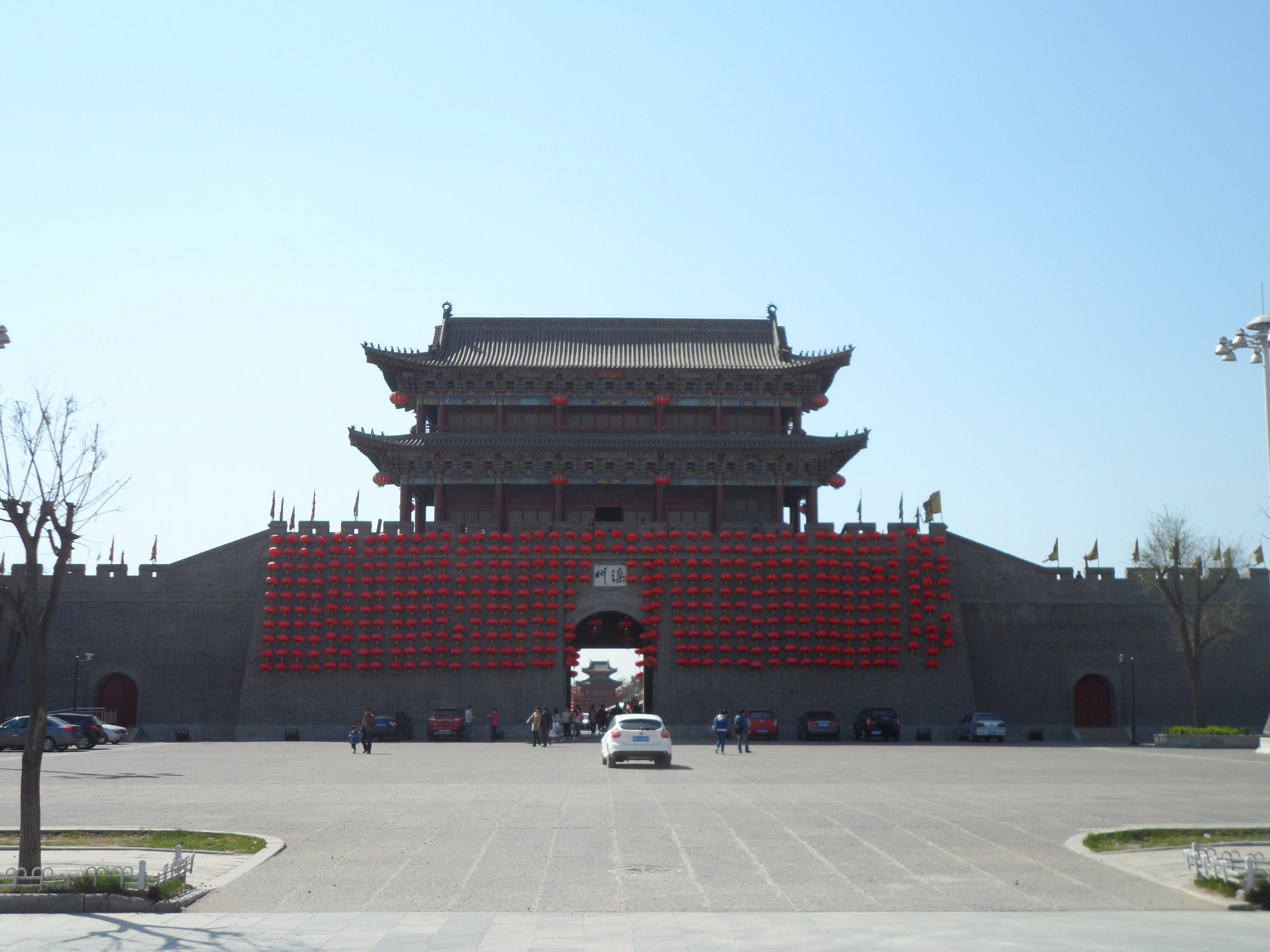

- Location of the seat in Hebei
- Coordinates: 39.741°N 118.704°E
- Country: People's Republic of China
- Province: Hebei
- Prefecture-level city: Tangshan

Area
  - Total: 999 km^{2} (386 sq mi)

Population (2024)
  - Total: 518,900
  - Density: 519/km^{2} (1,350/sq mi)
- Time zone: UTC+8 (China Standard)
- Postal code: 063700
- Website: http://www.luanxian.gov.cn/

Luanzhou (simplified Chinese: 滦州市; traditional Chinese: 灤州市; pinyin: Luánzhōu Shì), formerly Luan County (simplified Chinese: 滦县; traditional Chinese: 灤縣; pinyin: Luán Xiàn), is a county-level city in the east of Hebei province, China. It is under the administration of Tangshan city. The city spans an area of about 1,027 square kilometres (397 mi^{2}), and, as of 2024, has a population of 518,900. The city's economy is largely industrial, and it is home to large deposits of iron ore.

The area is named after the Luan River, which flows through the city.

== History ==
The area of present-day Luanzhou was once part of the state of Guzhu.

During the Han dynasty, the area was organized as Haiyang County (simplified Chinese: 海阳县; traditional Chinese: 海陽縣; pinyin: Hǎiyáng Xiàn).

Abaoji, the founding emperor of the Liao dynasty, further settled the area with captured families.

In 1629, as part of the first campaign of the Qing's conquest of Ming, Luanzhou was captured by Hong Taiji's forces.

During the 1911 Revolution, the Luanzhou Mutiny took place in the city.

== Geography ==
Luanzhou is located in the eastern part of Tangshan. It borders Lulong County and Changli County in neighboring Qinhuangdao across the Luan River to the east, Luannan County to the south, Fengrun District, Guye District, and Kaiping District to the west, and the county-level city of Qian'an and Qianxi County to the north.

The city is located at the southern foothills of the Yan Mountains. The city's elevation is generally higher in the north, and lower in the south.

Major rivers in Luanzhou include the Luan River, the Sha River, the Heng River (Chinese: 横河; pinyin: Héng Hé), the Su River (Chinese: 溯河; pinyin: Sù Hé), the Yuejia River (Chinese: 岳家河), the Xiaoqinglong River (Chinese: 小青龙河; pinyin: Xiǎoqīnglóng Hé), the Guan River (Chinese: 管河; pinyin: Guǎn Hé), the Longwan River (Chinese: 龙湾河; pinyin: Lóngwān Hé), and the Gouniao River (Chinese: 狗尿河; pinyin: Gǒuniào Hé). The city is also home to eight major reservoirs.

=== Climate ===
Climate data for Luanzhou, elevation 43 m (141 ft), (1991–2020 normals, extremes 1981–2025)
Month	Jan	Feb	Mar	Apr	May	Jun	Jul	Aug	Sep	Oct	Nov	Dec	Year
Record high °C (°F)	12.4 (54.3)	19.0 (66.2)	28.3 (82.9)	32.1 (89.8)	35.9 (96.6)	39.3 (102.7)	39.2 (102.6)	36.0 (96.8)	33.7 (92.7)	31.8 (89.2)	21.3 (70.3)	12.4 (54.3)	39.3 (102.7)
Mean daily maximum °C (°F)	1.1 (34.0)	4.8 (40.6)	11.6 (52.9)	19.4 (66.9)	25.6 (78.1)	29.0 (84.2)	30.4 (86.7)	29.8 (85.6)	26.3 (79.3)	19.1 (66.4)	9.7 (49.5)	2.7 (36.9)	17.5 (63.4)
Daily mean °C (°F)	−4.6 (23.7)	−1.3 (29.7)	5.2 (41.4)	12.9 (55.2)	19.3 (66.7)	23.2 (73.8)	25.7 (78.3)	24.8 (76.6)	20.1 (68.2)	12.8 (55.0)	4.1 (39.4)	−2.5 (27.5)	11.6 (53.0)
Mean daily minimum °C (°F)	−9.1 (15.6)	−6.1 (21.0)	−0.2 (31.6)	7.1 (44.8)	13.3 (55.9)	18.2 (64.8)	21.8 (71.2)	20.8 (69.4)	15.1 (59.2)	7.7 (45.9)	−0.3 (31.5)	−6.5 (20.3)	6.8 (44.3)
Record low °C (°F)	−21.3 (−6.3)	−20.3 (−4.5)	−11.5 (11.3)	−4.7 (23.5)	4.5 (40.1)	7.6 (45.7)	14.9 (58.8)	11.7 (53.1)	2.6 (36.7)	−4.3 (24.3)	−15.0 (5.0)	−17.3 (0.9)	−21.3 (−6.3)
Average precipitation mm (inches)	2.7 (0.11)	4.6 (0.18)	6.9 (0.27)	25.0 (0.98)	45.1 (1.78)	95.0 (3.74)	166.2 (6.54)	147.6 (5.81)	50.1 (1.97)	31.7 (1.25)	13.3 (0.52)	3.3 (0.13)	591.5 (23.28)
Average precipitation days (≥ 0.1 mm)	1.7	2.2	2.9	4.9	7.4	9.9	12.0	10.3	6.1	4.6	3.1	2.4	67.5
Average snowy days	2.8	2.4	1.2	0.4	0	0	0	0	0	0.1	1.7	2.9	11.5
Average relative humidity (%)	50	50	48	49	55	68	78	80	71	63	58	53	60
Mean monthly sunshine hours	187.2	187.0	231.3	244.4	270.1	225.9	189.2	207.1	220.4	206.3	175.2	175.6	2,519.7
Percentage possible sunshine	62	61	62	61	61	51	42	49	60	60	59	61	57
Source: China Meteorological Administration October all-time Record

== Government and politics ==
The seat of Luanzhou's government is located in Luanhe Subdistrict.

=== Administrative divisions ===
Luanzhou administers four subdistricts and ten towns. The city's four subdistricts are Luanhe Subdistrict (滦河街道), Gucheng Subdistrict (古城街道), Luancheng Subdistrict (滦城街道), and Xiangtang Subdistrict (响嘡街道).

The city's ten towns are Dong'angezhuang (东安各庄镇), Leizhuang (雷庄镇), Ciyutuo (茨榆坨镇), Zhenzi (榛子镇), Yangliuzhuang (杨柳庄镇), Youzha (油榨镇), Guma (古马镇), Xiaomazhuang (小马庄镇), Jiubaihu (九百户镇), and Wangdianzi.

== Demographics ==
As of 2024, Luanzhou has a population of 518,900. This represents a decrease from the 554,315 people recorded in the 2010 Chinese Census. A 2002 estimate put the city's population at about 534,400. It had a recorded population of 536,151 in the 2000 Chinese Census. A 1996 estimate pegged its population at around 524,000.

The city has an urban population of 291,900 (56.25% of its total population), and a rural population of 227,000 (43.75%).

Per capita disposable income reached 45,391 renminbi (RMB) for urban residents in 2020, a 4.1% increase from 2019, and a 43.7% increase from 2015. Per capita disposable income totaled 20,476 RMB for rural residents (+7.0% from 2019; +50.7% from 2015).

=== Ethnic groups ===
Luanzhou is predominantly Han Chinese, who make up about 98.24% of its population, with 37 other recognized ethnic minorities comprising the other 1.76%. The largest ethnic minority in Luanzhou are the Manchus, who number 6,504 (1.25% of its total population), followed by the Mongols (807 people, 0.16%), and the Hui (607, 0.12%).

== Economy ==
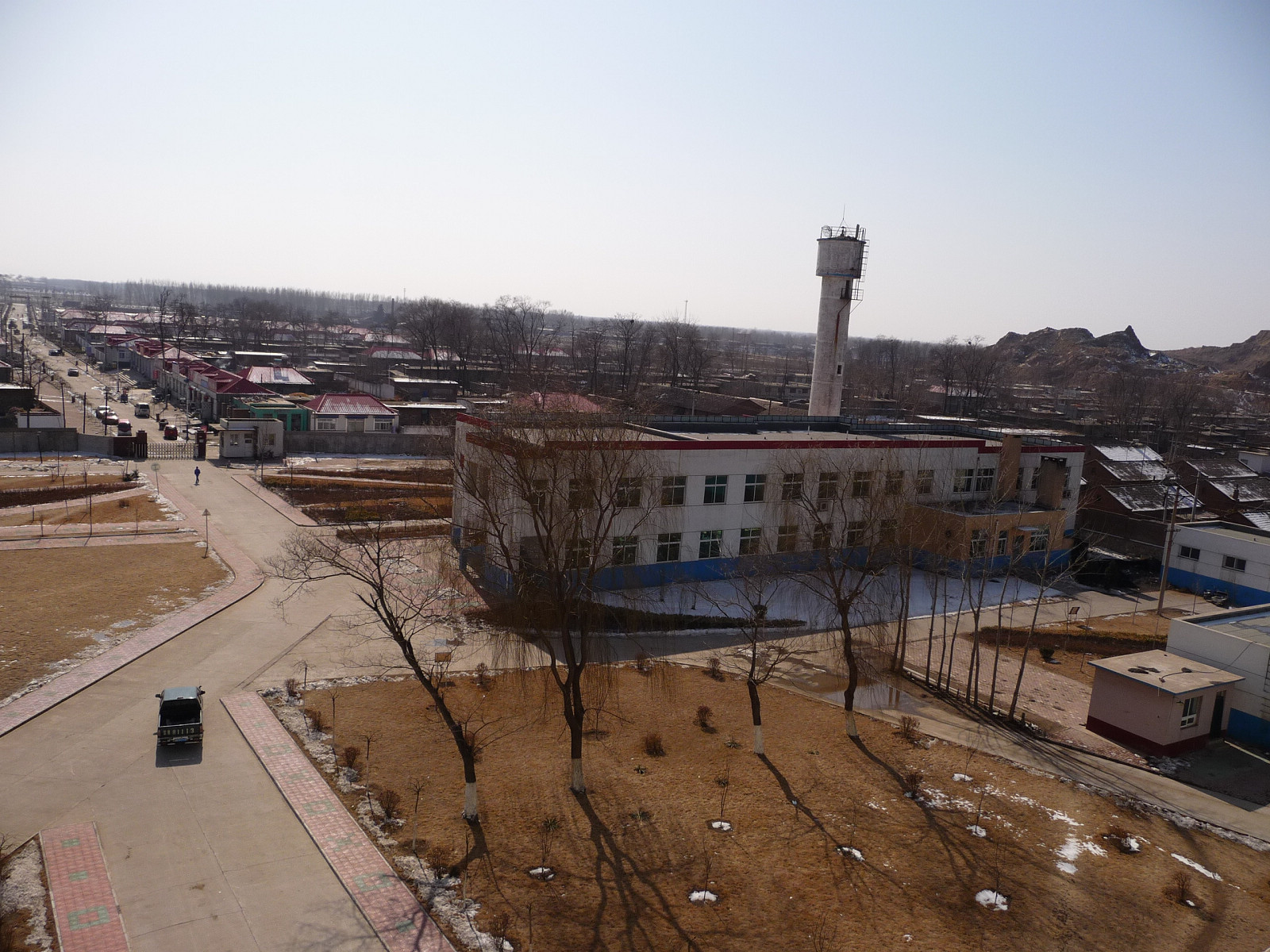
A dorm building for iron mine workers in Luanzhou

In 2020, Luanzhou reported a gross domestic product (GDP) of 41.61 billion renminbi (RMB). This represents a 4.1% increase from 2019, and a 35.8% increase from 2015. As of 2020, the city's primary sector accounted for 5.18 billion RMB (12.44% of total GDP), the secondary sector accounted for 24.22 billion RMB (58.21%), and the tertiary sector accounted for 12.22 billion RMB (29.37%). Total retail sales of consumer goods in the city totaled 9.17 billion RMB in 2020.

=== Agriculture and animal husbandry ===
As of 2020, Luanzhou has 40,400 hectares (100,000 acres) of grain sowing area, which produced an output of 261,900 tons. There was also 14,900 hectares (37,000 acres) for growing oilseeds, yielding 64,100 tons, 9,700 hectares (24,000 acres) for growing vegetables, yielding 832,800 tons, and 104.7 hectares (259 acres) for growing cotton, yielding 124.1 tons. The city produced 105,000 tons of fruit in 2020.

In 2020, 39,300 tons of meat was produced in Luanzhou, including 17,800 tons of pork, 11,400 tons of beef, and 1,300 tons of mutton. 21,500 tons of poultry and eggs were produced in 2020.

=== Industry ===
Major manufactured goods produced in Luanzhou include coke, iron products, pig iron, steel, forged products, mining equipment, vegetable oil, dairy products, beverages, composite wood, benzene, cement, concrete, lime, and bricks.

=== Mineral reserves ===
Proven mineral resources in Luanzhou include iron, limestone, dolomite, quartzite, sandstone, granite, lead, coal, and zinc. Total iron reserves in Luanzhou total 3.036 billion tons, about 20% of China's total iron reserves.

== Education ==
As of 2020, Luanzhou has 134 schools. The city also has a cultural center, a museum, and a public library.

== Transportation ==
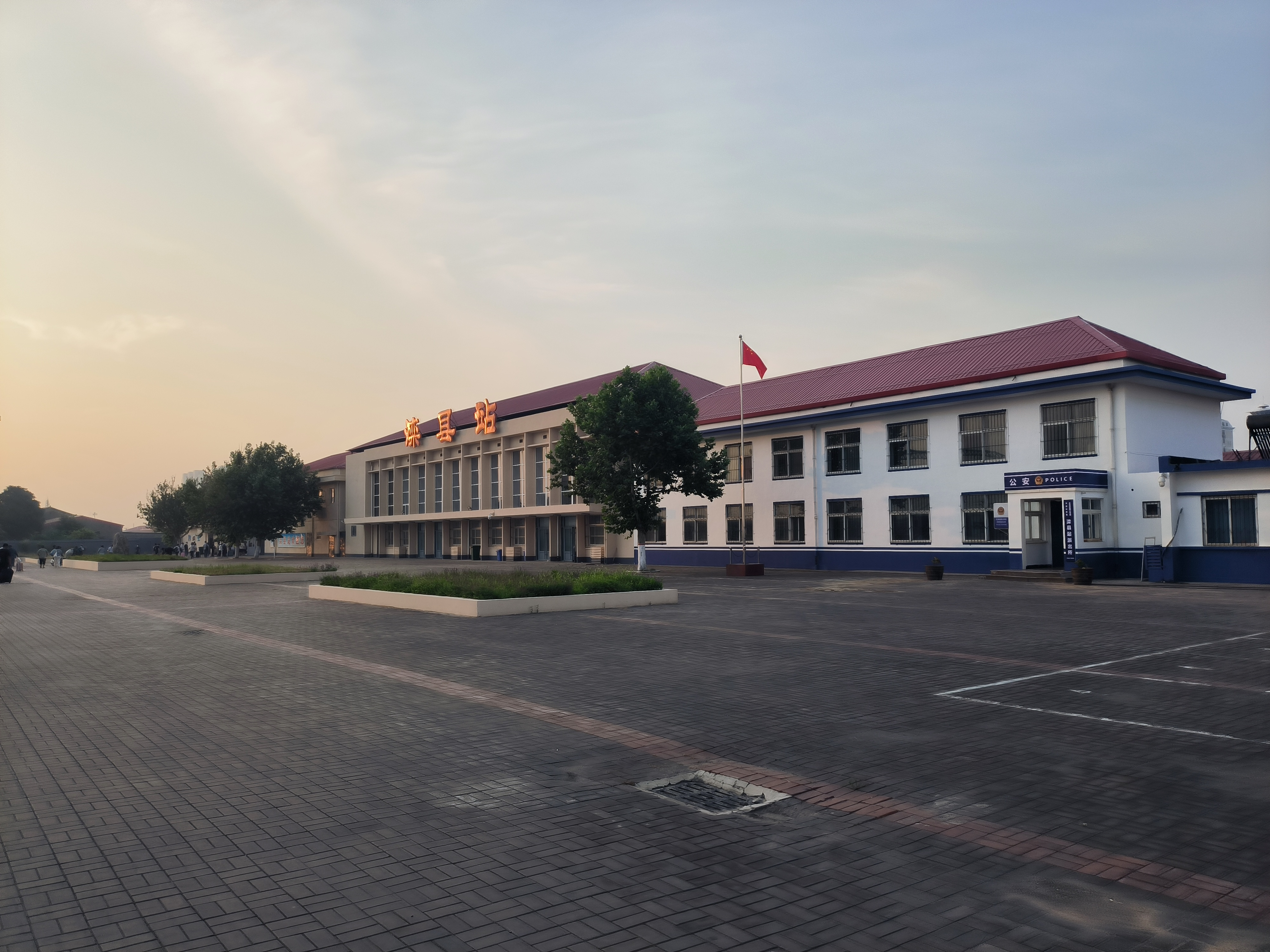
The Luanxian Railway Station

China National Highway 205 runs through Luanzhou.

As of 2020, the city has 114 buses, serving 73 passenger lines.

The city is served by the Luanxian Railway Station.

== Culture ==
Luanzhou is home to distinct forms of shadow puppetry and paper-cutting.

== Healthcare ==
As of 2020, Luanzhou has 986 health institutions of various types, including 15 hospitals. The city's health institutions have 2,605 beds, or about 4.65 per 1,000 people. There are 2.81 practicing (assistant) physicians per 1,000 people.
