= Jinzhou railway station (Jinzhou) =

Railway station in Jinzhou, Liaoning, China

Coordinates: 41°07′30″N 121°08′27″E

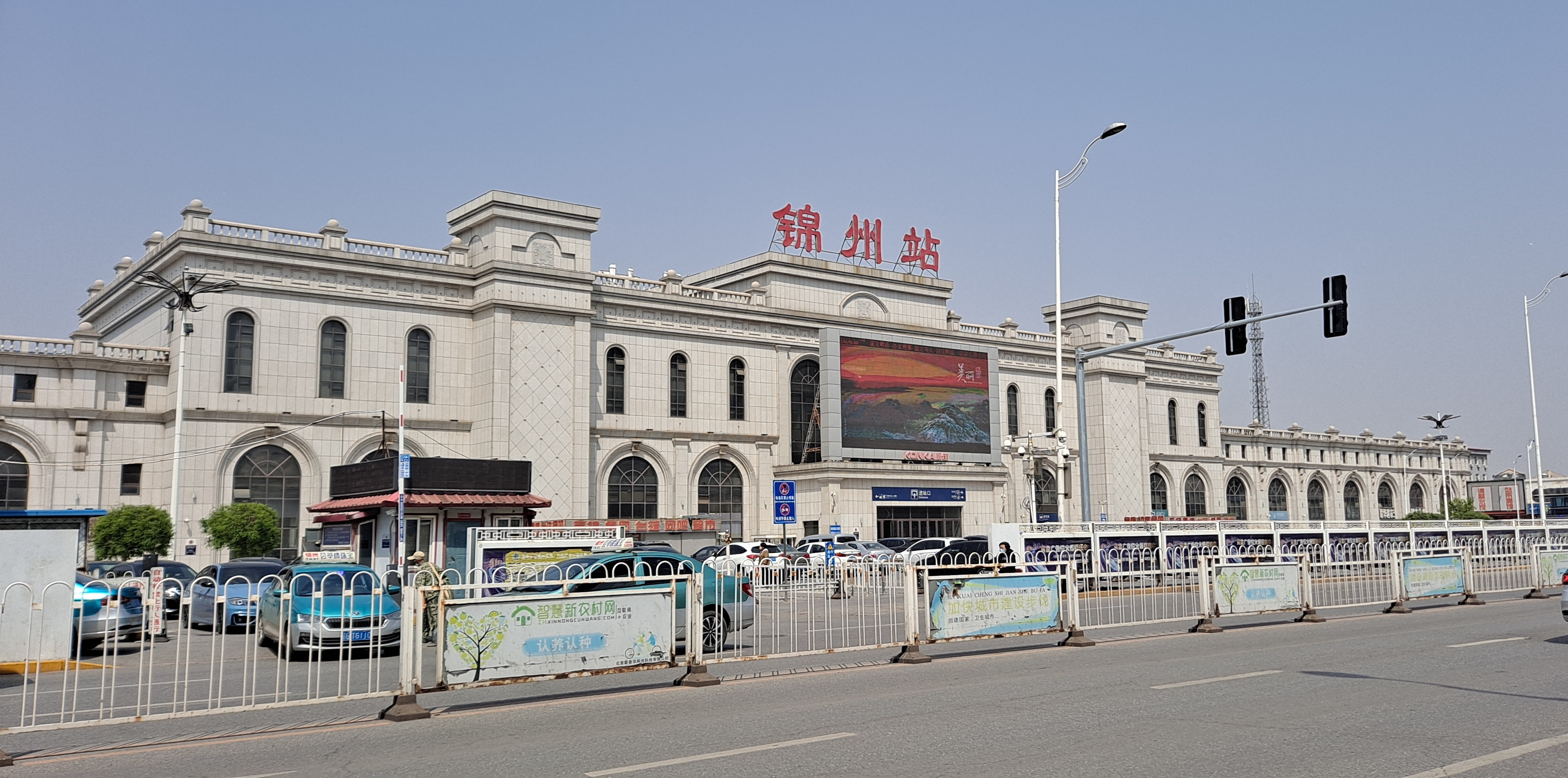
Jinzhou Railway Station

Jinzhou railway station (simplified Chinese: 锦州站; traditional Chinese: 錦州站) is a railway station in Jinzhou, Liaoning, China. It is the eastern terminus of the Jinzhou–Chengde railway.

Preceding station	China Railway	Following station
Xingcheng towards Beijing	Beijing–Harbin railway	Goubangzi towards Harbin
