= Xingcheng railway station =

Railway station in Xingcheng, China

Coordinates: 40.622218°N 120.696928°E

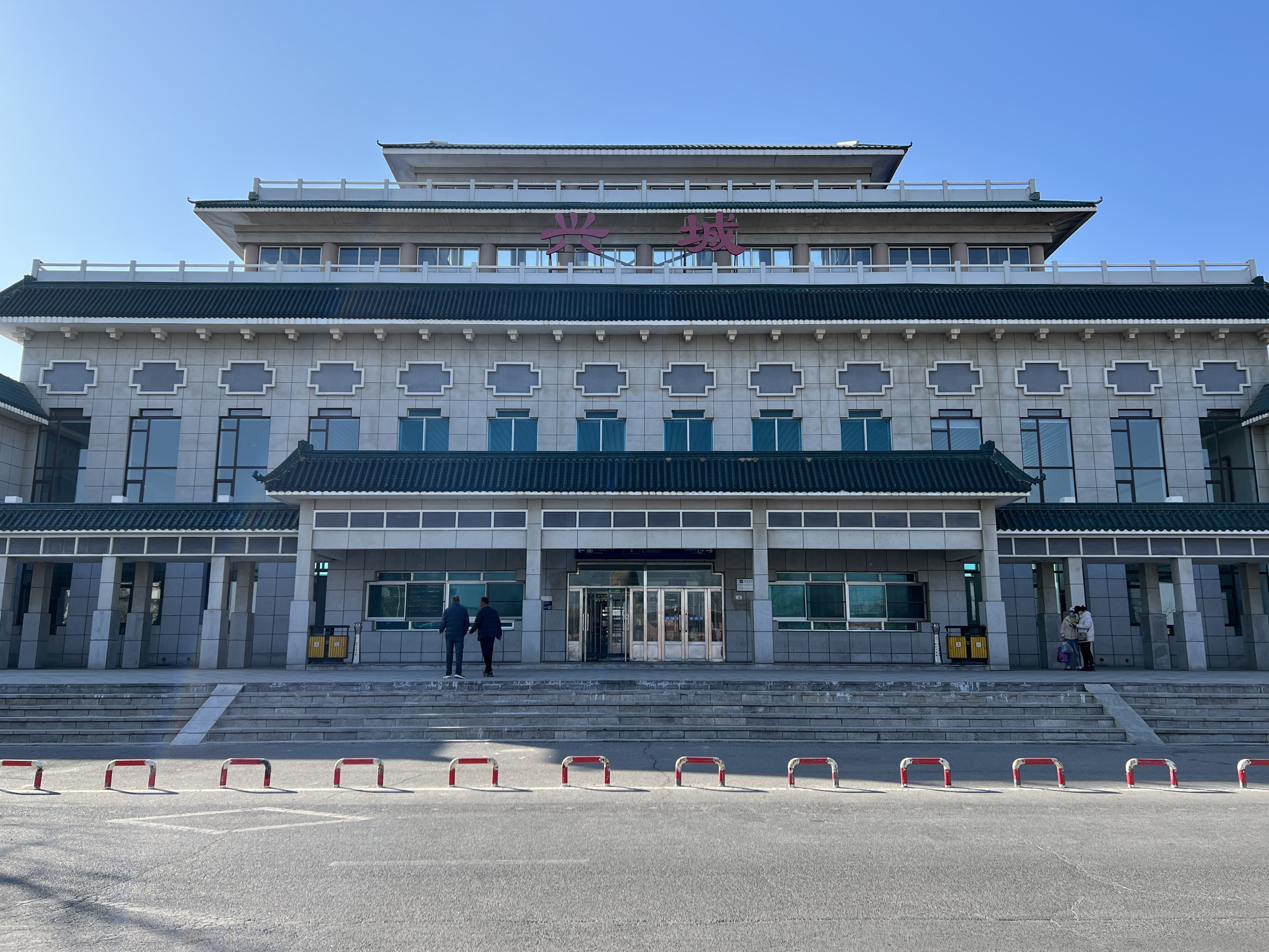
Xingcheng railway station

Xingcheng railway station (simplified Chinese: 兴城站; traditional Chinese: 興城站) is a railway station in Xingcheng, Huludao, Liaoning, China. It was built in 1898.

| Preceding station | China Railway | Following station |
|---|---|---|
| Shanhaiguan towards Beijing | Beijing–Harbin railway | Jinzhou towards Harbin |
