= T17/18 Beijing–Mudanjiang through train =

Railway service in China

The T17/18 Beijing–Mudanjiang through train (Chinese:T17/18次北京到牡丹江特快速列车) is a railway running between Beijing to Mudanjiang. It carries express passenger trains by the Harbin Railway Bureau, Mudanjiang passenger segment responsible for passenger transport task, Mudanjiang originating on the Beijing train. 25K Passenger trains running along the Jingha Railway and Binsui Railway cross Heilongjiang, Jilin, Liaoning, Hebei, Tianjin, Beijing and other areas, covering 1552 km. Beijing railway station to Mudanjiang railway station require 16 hours and 50 minutes, while Mudanjiang railway station to Beijing railway station requires 17 hours and 36 minutes.

== Carriages ==
Carriage number	1	2	3-10	11	12	13-16	17
Type of carriages	UZ25K; Head end power car (Chinese: 发电车)	UZ25K; Postal car (Chinese: 邮政车)	YW25K; Hard sleeper (Chinese: 硬卧车)	RW25K; Soft sleeper (Chinese: 软卧车)	CA25K; Dining car (Chinese: 餐车)	YZ25K; Hard seat (Chinese: 硬座车)	XL25K; Baggage car (Chinese: 行李车)

== Locomotives ==
Sections	Beijing-Harbin	Harbin-Mudanjiang
Locomotives and their allocation	SS9 electric locomotive Shenyang Railway Bureau Shenyang Depot (Chinese: 沈局沈段)	DF4D diesel locomotive Harbin Railway Bureau Sankeshu Depot (Chinese: 哈局三段)

=== Timetable ===
T17		Stops	T18	
Arrive	Depart	Stops	Arrive	Depart
—	21:24	Beijing	08:36	—
22:47	22:50	Tangshan North	↑	↑
03:49	03:55	Shenyang North	02:17	02:23
08:39	08:55	Harbin	20:29	20:58
09:30	09:32	Acheng	19:32	19:36
↓	↓	Maoershan	18:36	18:39
13:44	13:46	Hailin	15:23	15:25
14:14	—	Mudanjiang	—	15:00

== See also ==
- T297/298 Beijing–Mudanjiang through train
