= T297/298 Beijing–Mudanjiang through train =

Railway service in China

The T297/298 Beijing-Mudanjiang through train (Chinese:T297/298次北京到牡丹江特快速列车) is a railway running from Beijing to Mudanjiang. It carries express passenger trains for the Harbin Railway Bureau It hosts the Mudanjiang passenger segment responsible for passenger transport. Mudanjiang originates on the Beijing train. 25K Type Passenger trains run along the Jingqin Railway, Shenshan Railway, Hada Railway and Binsui Railway across Heilongjiang, Jilin, Liaoning, Hebei, Tianjin, Beijing and other areas. The line covers 1566 km. The Beijing railway station to Mudanjiang railway station route runs 19 hours and 39 minutes. Mudanjiang to Beijing runs 19 hours and 15 minutes.

== Carriages ==
Carriage number	1	2	3－10	11	12	13－16	17
Type of carriages	UZ25K; Head end power car (Chinese: 发电车)	UZ25K; Postal car (Chinese: 邮政车)	YW25K; Hard sleeper (Chinese: 硬卧车)	RW25K; Soft sleeper (Chinese: 软卧车)	CA25K; Dining car (Chinese: 餐车)	YZ25K; Hard seat (Chinese: 硬座车)	XL25K; Baggage car (Chinese: 行李车)

== Locomotives ==
Sections	Beijing－Harbin	Harbin－Mudanjiang
Locomotives and their allocation	SS9 electric locomotive Shenyang Railway Bureau Shenyang Depot (Chinese: 沈局沈段)	DF4D diesel locomotive Harbin Railway Bureau Sankeshu Depot (Chinese: 哈局三段)

=== Timetable ===
T297		Stops	T298	
Arrive	Depart	Stops	Arrive	Depart
—	12:00	Beijing	10:50	—
13:24	13:27	Tangshan North	09:16	09:19
14:51	14:54	Changli	↑	↑
15:27	15:43	Qinhuangdao	07:50	07:54
16:09	16:15	Shanhaiguan	07:26	07:32
↓	↓	Huludao	06:01	06:03
18:12	18:18	Jinzhou	0532	05:29
↓	↓	Goubangzi	04:37	04:40
19:19	19:21	Dahushan	↑	↑
20:45	20:51	Shenyang North	02:33	02:56
21:26	21:28	Tieling	↑	↑
23:39	23:47	Changchun	23:59	00:06
01:58	02:21	Harbin	20:40	21:12
04:10	04:14	Shangzhi	18:39	18:46
05:10	05:13	Yabuli	17:40	17:42
07:09	07:12	Hailin	↑	↑
07:39	—	Mudanjiang	—	15:35

== See also ==
- T17/18 Beijing–Mudanjiang through train
