= Ashi River =

River in Heilongjiang, China

Coordinates: 45°49′29″N 126°42′43″E

- Chinese: 阿什河
Transcriptions
Standard Mandarin
- Hanyu Pinyin: Āshí Hé
- Wade–Giles: A-shih Ho

Gold River
- Chinese: 按出虎
Transcriptions
Standard Mandarin
- Hanyu Pinyin: Ànchūhǔ
- Wade–Giles: An-ch'u-hu

The Ashi River is a right tributary of the Songhua in eastern Manchuria, in Harbin's Acheng District in the People's Republic of China.

== Name ==
The river has borne the name "Ashi" since the Qing (17th–20th century). Before that, it was known as the Anchuhu (Middle Chinese: ʔan-tsyhwit-xu), a medieval Chinese transcription of its original Jurchen name Anchun, Ancun, or Alcun, (Note: Preserved in Chinese transcription as 按春, now pronounced ànchūn but ʔan-tsyhwin in Middle Chinese.) meaning 'gold' or 'golden', presumably from placer deposits along its banks.

== History ==
From the 2nd century BC to the 5th century AD, the river formed part of the Korean kingdom of Buyeo.

The river was the home to Huining (now Acheng), the original settlement of the Wanyan clan of the Jurchens. When their chief Aguda declared himself the successor of the Liao c. 1115, he adopted the dynastic name Jin as a Chinese translation of the river's name. (Note: A passage in the official History of Jin gives a garbled Chinese misunderstanding of the reasons for the adoption of the name. Cf. Chan.) Huining—as Shangjing (the "Upper Capital")—served as the Jin capital until 1234 and later served as a subsidiary capital after 1173.

== See also ==
- Rivers of China
