= Z9/10 Beijing–Hangzhou through train =

Railway service in China

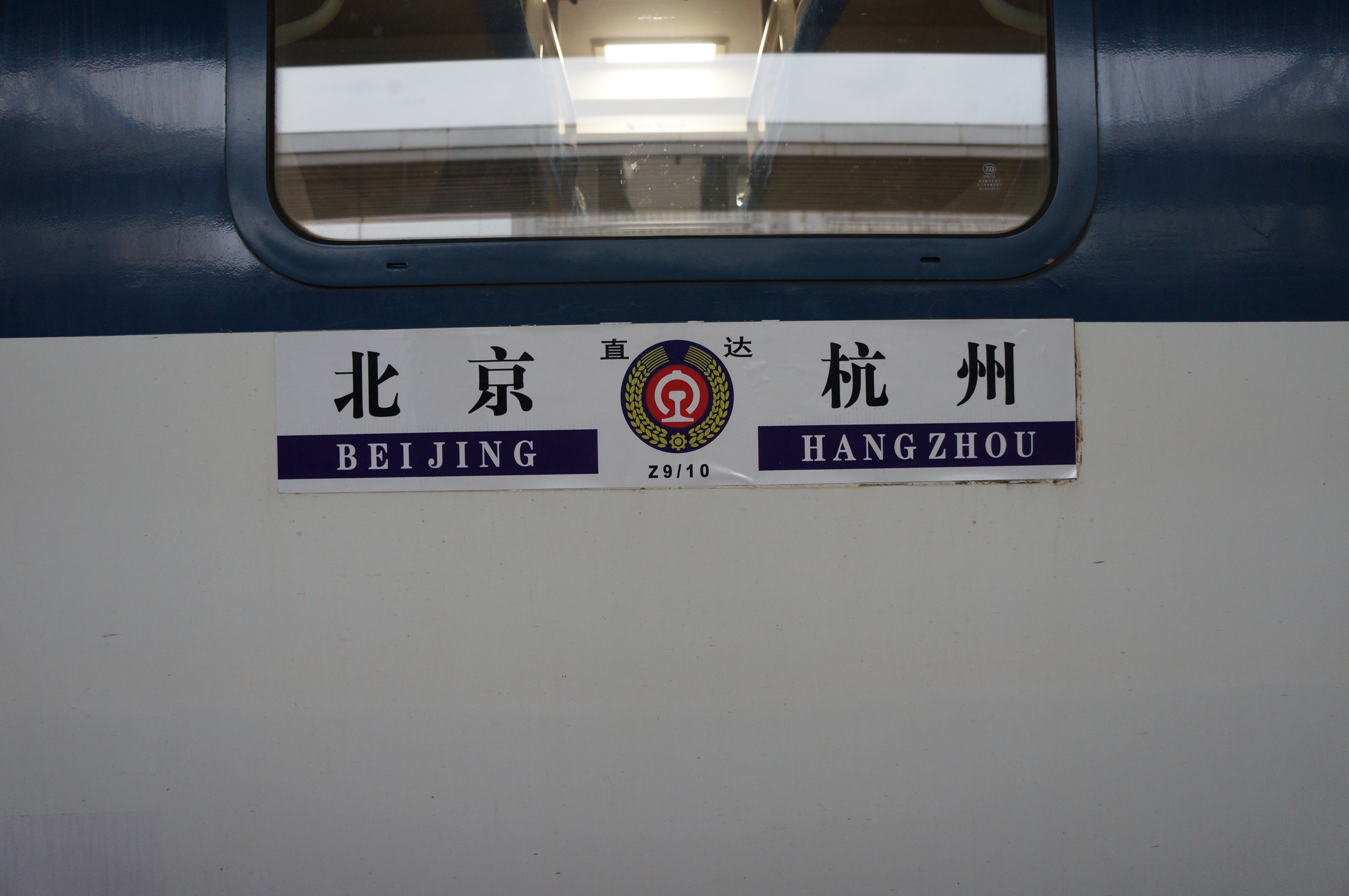
Direction board

The Z9/10 Beijing–Hangzhou through train (Chinese: Z9/10次北京到杭州直达特快列车) is a Chinese railway running between the capital Beijing to Hangzhou, capital of Zhejiang express passenger trains by the Beijing Railway Bureau, Hangzhou passenger segment responsible for passenger transport task, Hangzhou originating on the Beijing train. 25T Type Passenger trains running along the Hukun Railway and Jinghu Railway across Zhejiang, Shanghai, Jiangsu, Anhui, Shandong, Hebei, Tianjin, Beijing and other provinces and cities, the entire 1633 km. Beijing railway station to Hangzhou railway station running 13 hours and 53 minutes, use trips for Z9; Hangzhou railway station to Beijing railway station to run 13 hours and 40 minutes, use trips for Z10.

== Carriages ==
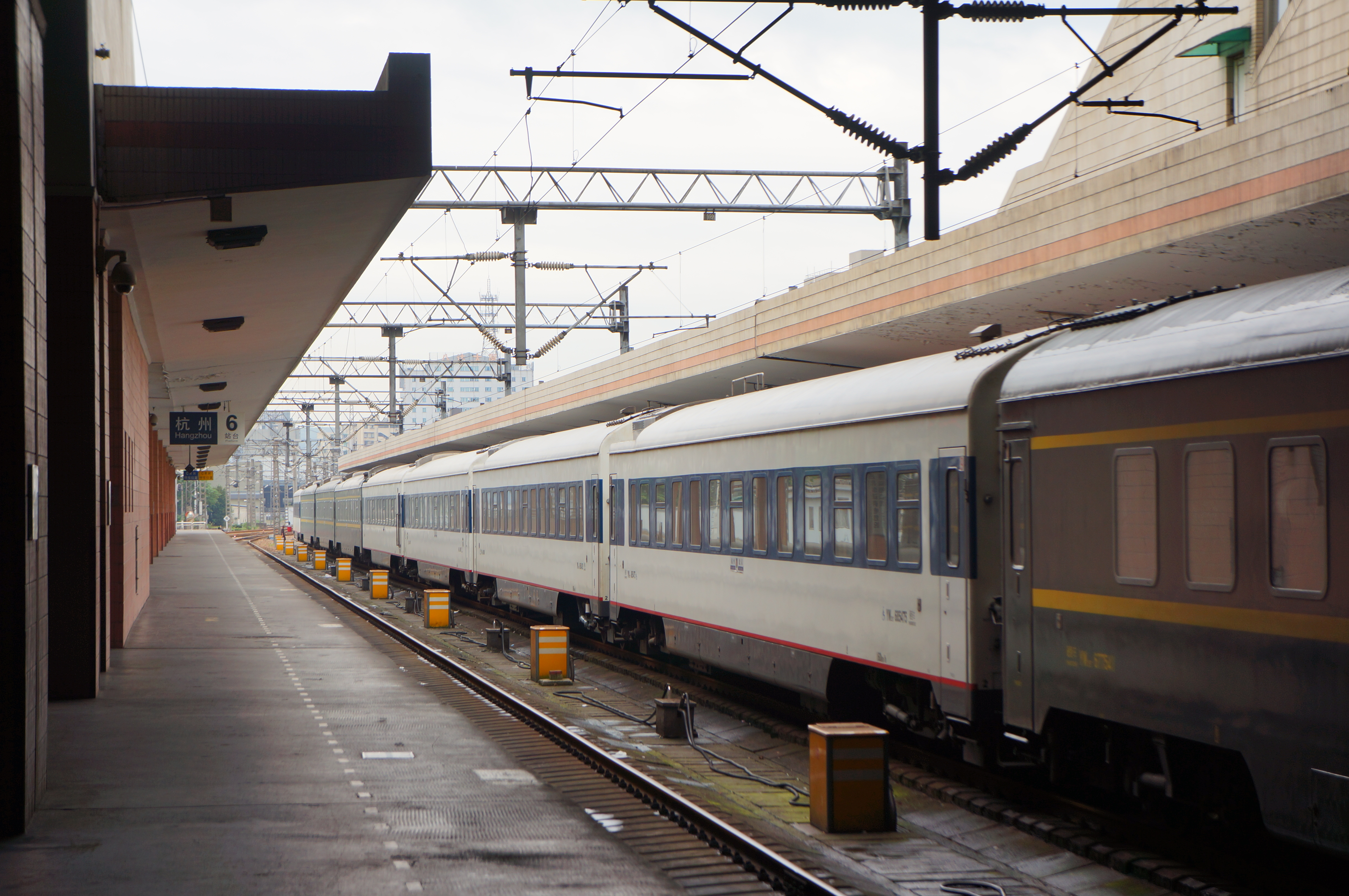
25T-carriages of Z9

Carriage number	1－5	6	7	8－18
Type of carriages	YZ25T; Hard seat (Chinese: 硬座车)	CA25T; Dining car (Chinese: 餐车)	RW25T; Soft sleeper (Chinese: 软卧车)	YW25T; Hard sleeper (Chinese: 硬卧车)

== Locomotives ==
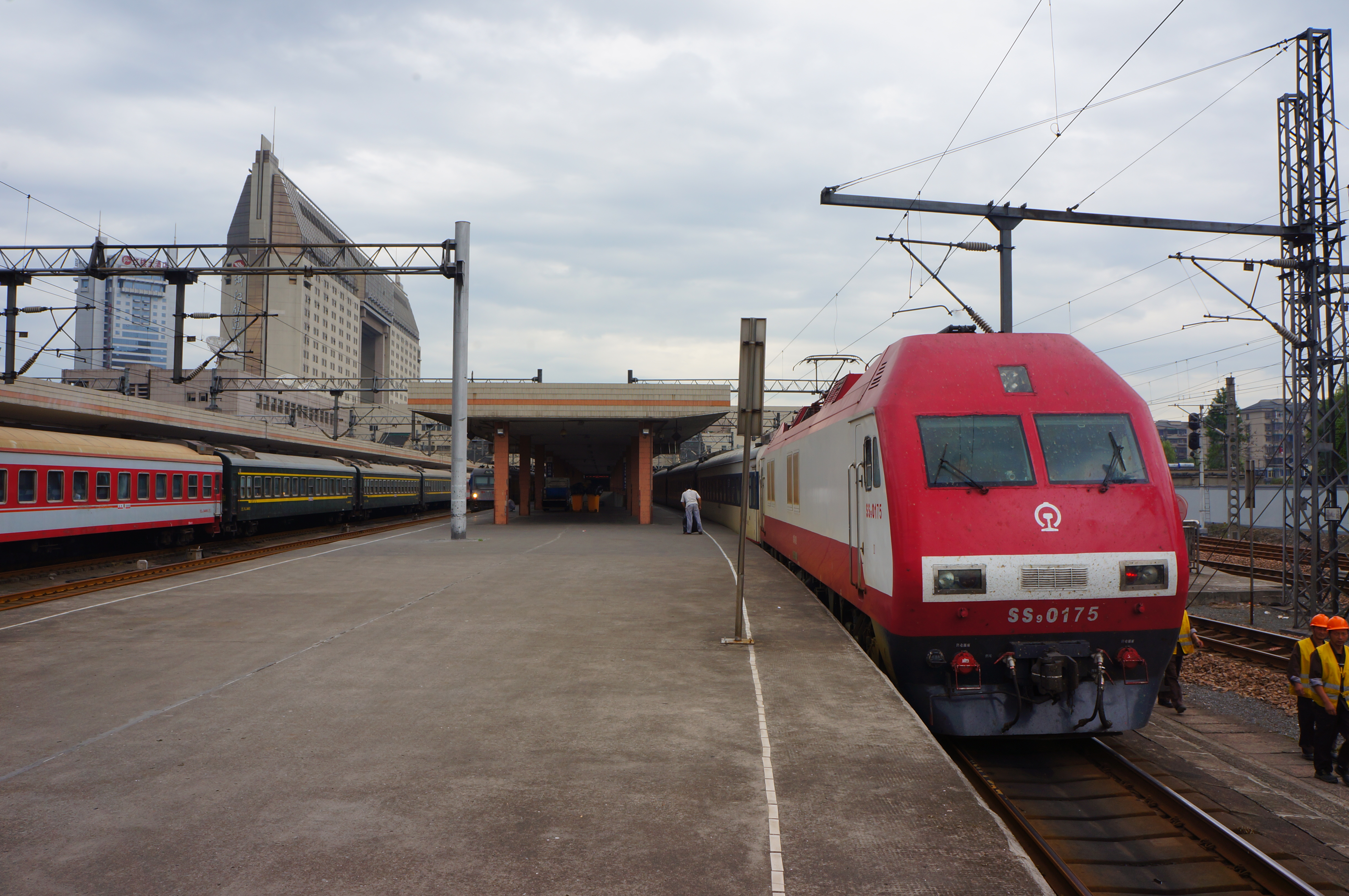
Z9 hauled by SS9G at Hangzhou railway station

Sections	Beijing－Hangzhou
Locomotives and their allocation	SS9G electric locomotive Beijing Railway Bureau Beijing Depot (Chinese: 京局京段)

== Timetable ==
Z9		Stops	Z10	
Arrive	Depart	Stops	Arrive	Depart
—	19:08	Beijing	07:34	—
20:24	20:26	Tianjin West	05:58	06:19
08:22	08:25	Haining	17:51	17:54
09:29	—	Hangzhou	—	17:17
