= K53/54 Beijing–Shenyang through train =

Railway service in China

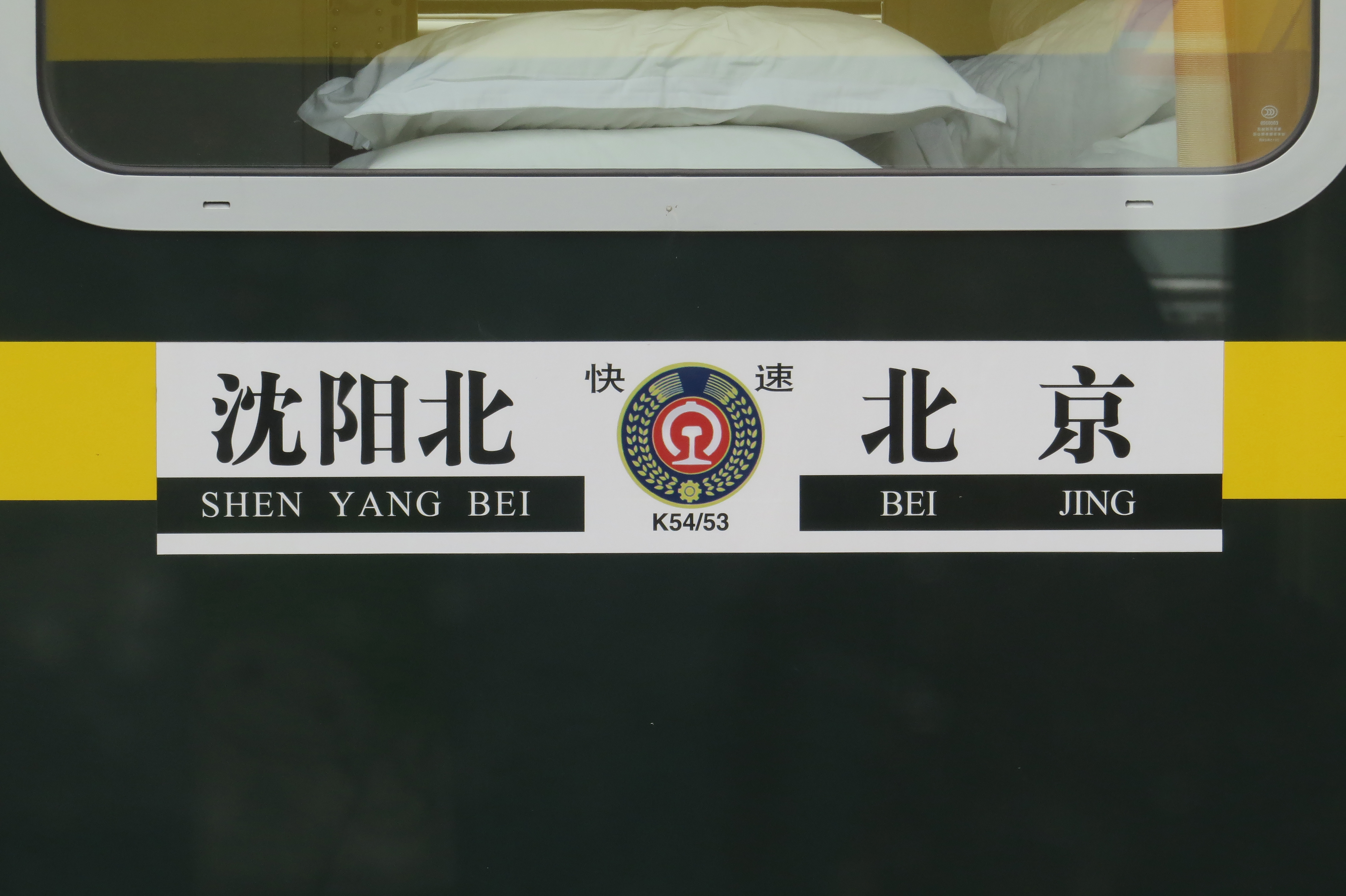

Overview
- Service type: Rapid
- Status: Operating
- Locale: Beijing, Shenyang
- First service: 21 November 1954; 70 years ago
- Current operator(s): China Railway Shenyang Group

Route
- Termini: Beijing railway station Shenyang North railway station
- Distance travelled: 727 km (452 mi)
- Average journey time: ~9 hours
- Service frequency: Daily each way

On-board services
- Class(es): Hard sleeper, Soft sleeper, Luxury soft sleeper

The K53/54 Beijing–Shenyang through train is a train service running between Beijing and Shenyang, the capital of Liaoning province. It is operated by China Railway Shenyang Group using 25G sleeper carriages. The 727 km journey takes the train on the Beijing-Harbin Railway, Tianjin-Shanhaiguan Railway and Shenyang-Shanhaiguan Railway. The train from Beijing to Shenyang is numbered K53, with a journey time of around 9 hours, while the train in the opposite direction is numbered K54, with a journey time of about 9 hours and 30 minutes.

== History ==
The train has been in operation since 1954, when it was operated by the then Beijing Railway Bureau. Operation was then handed over to Shenyang Railway Bureau in 1966. In 1991, the train was renumbered 53/54 and received an upgrade to air-conditioned 25G sleeper carriages, after which there were no more major amendments till today.

Due to the overnight nature of the train, its demand was largely unaffected by the launch of EMU trains between Beijing and Shenyang, and it remains a popular choice of travellers.

== Formation ==
The train currently utilises 25G carriages, with a formation consisting of mostly hard sleeper carriages. The train is also the first in China to only have sleeper carriages in its formation.

Carriage number	1	2－11	12	13	14	15－17	18
Type of carriages	UZ25G; Postal car (Chinese: 邮政车)	YW25G; Hard sleeper (Chinese: 硬卧车)	RW25G; Soft sleeper (Chinese: 软卧车)	RW25G; Luxury Soft Sleeper (Chinese: 高级包厢软卧车)	RW25G; Soft sleeper (Chinese: 软卧车)	YW25G; Hard sleeper (Chinese: 硬卧车)	XL25G; Baggage car (Chinese: 行李车)

== Locomotives ==
The train utilises the SS9 electric locomotive for the entire journey. As the carriages have a power supply mode of DC600V, the locomotive is able to supply electricity directly to the carriages as well.

Section of journey	Beijing－Shenyang North
Locomotive utilised	China Railways SS9; Shenyang Railway Bureau Shenyang Depot (Chinese: 沈局沈段)

== Timetable ==
K53		Stops	K54	
Arrive	Depart	Stops	Arrive	Depart
—	22:24	Beijing	07:00	—
07:25	—	Shenyang North	—	21:25

== See also ==
- D51/52 Beijing-Shenyang Through Train
- Beijing-Shenyang Through Train
- G217/218 Beijing-Shenyang Through Train
- G219/220 Beijing-Shenyang Through Train
