= D51/52 Beijing–Shenyang through train =

Railway service in China

The D51/52 Beijing–Shenyang through train (Chinese: D51/52次北京到沈阳北动车组列车) is a Chinese railway running between the capital Beijing to Shenyang, capital of Liaoning express passenger trains by the Shenyang Railway Bureau, Shenyang passenger segment responsible for passenger transport task, Shenyang originating on the Beijing train. CRH5 Type Passenger trains running along the Jingha Railway, Panjin–Yingkou High-Speed Railway and Harbin–Dalian High-Speed Railway across Liaoning, Hebei, Tianjin, Beijing and other provinces and cities, the entire 699 km. Beijing railway station to Shenyang North railway station running 6 hours and 3 minutes, use trips for D51; Shenyang North railway station to Beijing railway station to run 6 hours and 1 minutes, use trips for D52.

== See also ==
- K53/54 Beijing-Shenyang Through Train
- Beijing-Shenyang Through Train
- G217/218 Beijing-Shenyang Through Train
- G219/220 Beijing-Shenyang Through Train
