= Jinlongshan =

Jinlongshan 金龙山镇 Daling Township (大岭乡)
- Town
- Location in Heilongjiang Jinlongshan (China)
- Coordinates: 45°30′30″N 127°07′14″E
- Country: People's Republic of China
- Province: Heilongjiang
- Sub-provincial city: Harbin
- District: Acheng
- Elevation: 177 m (581 ft)
- Time zone: UTC+8 (China Standard Time)
- Area code: 0451

Jinlongshan (simplified Chinese: 金龙山; traditional Chinese: 金龍山; pinyin: Jīnlóngshān; lit. 'golden dragon mountain'), formerly Daling Township (simplified Chinese: 大岭乡; traditional Chinese: 大嶺鄉; pinyin: Dàlǐng Xiāng) until October 2010, is a town in the southeast of Acheng District, Harbin, China, located more than 35 km (22 mi) southeast of the urban area of Harbin. Near the town is the Mount Hengtou National Forest Park (横头山国家森林公园).

== See also ==
- List of township-level divisions of Heilongjiang
