= Beijing–Shenyang through train =

Chinese railway

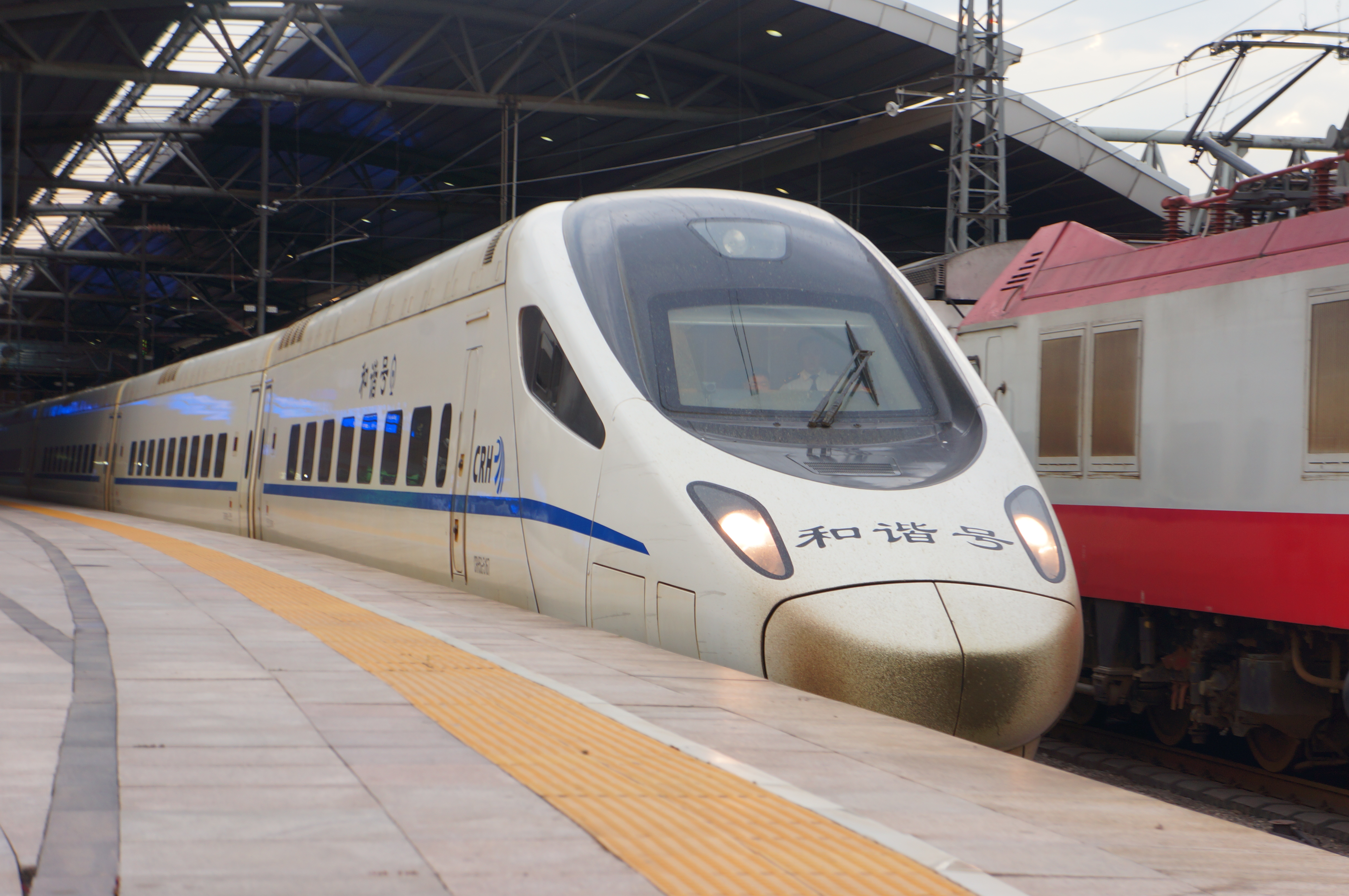
D1 departs from Beijing railway station

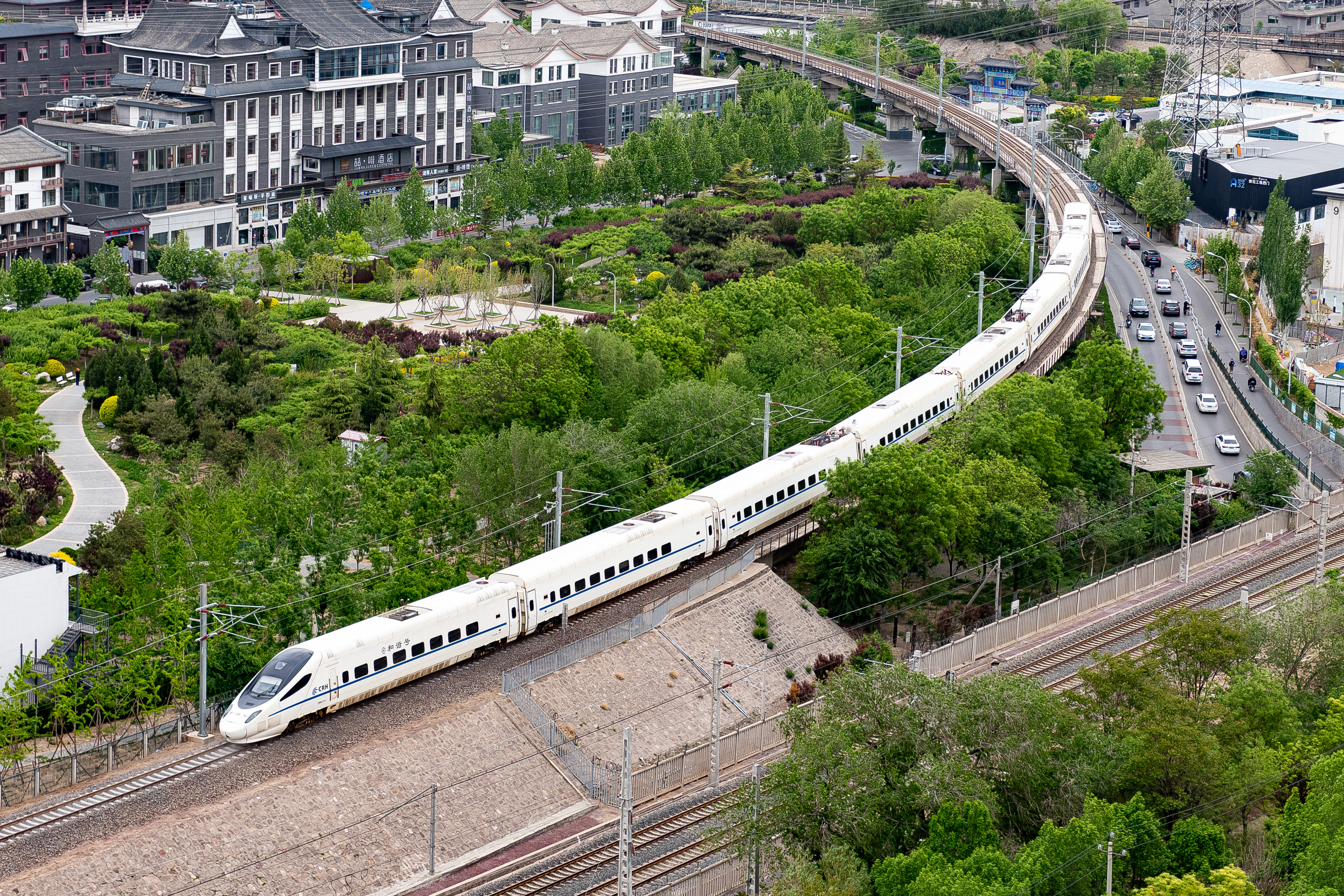
D4367 on the Beijing Northeast Ring railway

The Beijing–Shenyang through train (Chinese: 北京到沈阳动车组列车) is a Chinese railway that runs between the capital of China, Beijing to Shenyang, the capital of Liaoning. An express passenger train jointly operated by the Beijing Railway Bureau and Shenyang Railway Bureau, the Shenyang Railway Bureau is responsible for passenger transportation. CRH5 Type Passenger trains run along the Jingha Railway across Liaoning, Hebei, Tianjin, Beijing, and other provinces and cities for 622 km.

== Train trips ==
- D1: Beijing - Shenyang South
- D2: Shenyang - Beijing
- D3: Beijing - Shenyang North
- D4: Shenyang North - Beijing
- D5: Beijing - Shenyang North
- D6: Shenyang North - Beijing
- D7: Beijing - Shenyang North
- D8: Shenyang North - Beijing
- D9: Beijing - Shenyang North
- D10: Shenyang North - Beijing
- D11: Beijing - Shenyang North
- D12: Shenyang North - Beijing
- D13: Beijing - Shenyang
- D14: Shenyang North - Beijing
- D15: Beijing - Shenyang
- D16: Shenyang - Beijing
- D17: Beijing - Shenyang North
- D18: Shenyang North - Beijing
- D51: Beijing - Shenyang North
- D52: Beijing - Shenyang North

== See also ==
- K53/54 Beijing-Shenyang Through Train
- D51/52 Beijing-Shenyang Through Train
- G217/218 Beijing-Shenyang Through Train
- G219/220 Beijing-Shenyang Through Train
