= G219/220 Beijing–Shenyang through train =

Railway service in China

The G219/220 Beijing–Shenyang through train (Chinese: G219/220次北京南到沈阳高速动车组列车) is a Chinese railway running between the capital Beijing to Shenyang, capital of Liaoning express passenger trains by the Beijing Railway Bureau, Shenyang passenger segment responsible for passenger transport task, Shenyang originating on the Beijing train. CRH380B Type Passenger trains running along the Beijing–Shanghai High-Speed Railway, Tianjin–Qinhuangdao High-Speed Railway and Qinhuangdao–Shenyang High-Speed Railway across Liaoning, Hebei, Tianjin, Beijing and other provinces and cities, the entire 838 km. Beijing South railway station to Shenyang railway station running 3 hours and 58 minutes, use trips for G219; Shenyang railway station to Beijing South railway station to run 3 hours and 58 minutes, use trips for G220.

== See also ==
- K53/54 Beijing-Shenyang Through Train
- Beijing-Shenyang Through Train
- D51/52 Beijing-Shenyang Through Train
- G217/218 Beijing-Shenyang Through Train
