= Yuquan Subdistrict, Harbin =

Yuquan Subdistrict 玉泉街道
- Subdistrict
- Location in Heilongjiang Yuquan Subdistrict (China)
- Coordinates: 45.4152°N 127.1610°E
- Country: People's Republic of China
- Province: Heilongjiang
- Prefecture-level city: Harbin
- District: Acheng District
- Time zone: UTC+8 (China Standard)

Yuquan Subdistrict (Chinese: 玉泉街道; pinyin: Yùquán Jiēdào) is a subdistrict in Acheng District, Harbin, Heilongjiang, China. As of 2020, it has two residential neighborhoods and four villages under its administration:

Neighborhoods

- Henan Community (河南社区)
- Rongxing Community (荣兴社区)

Villages

- Mopan Village (磨盘村)
- Zhenbei Village (镇北村)
- Laoying Village (老营村)
- Hongguang Village (红光村)

== See also ==
- List of township-level divisions of Heilongjiang
