= Acheng, Harbin =

Acheng 阿城区
- District
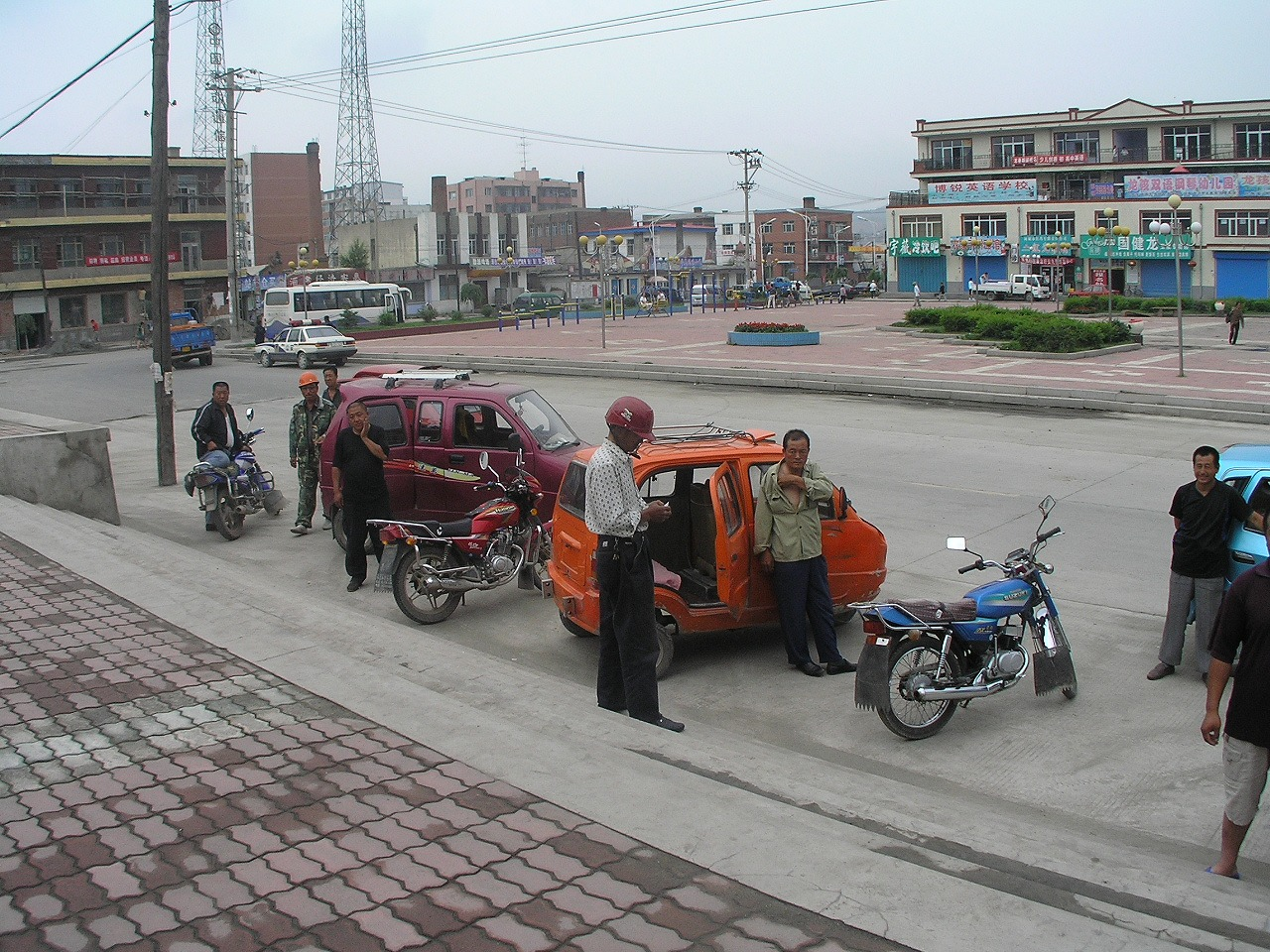

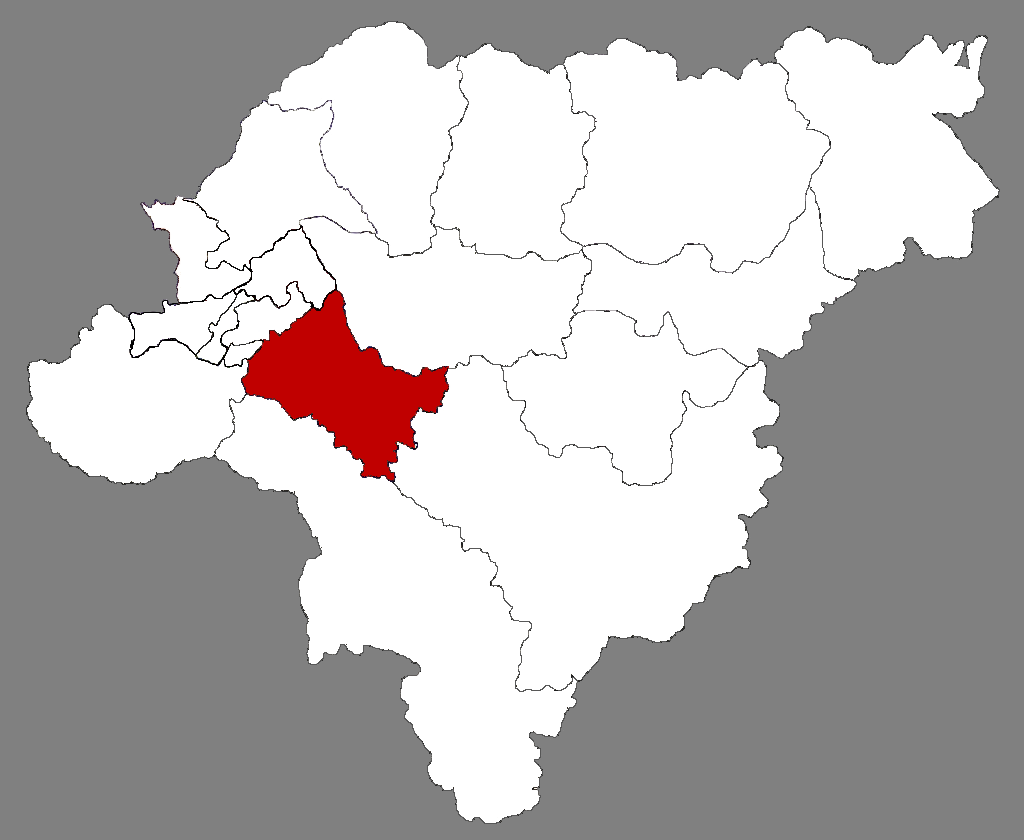
- Location of Acheng in Harbin

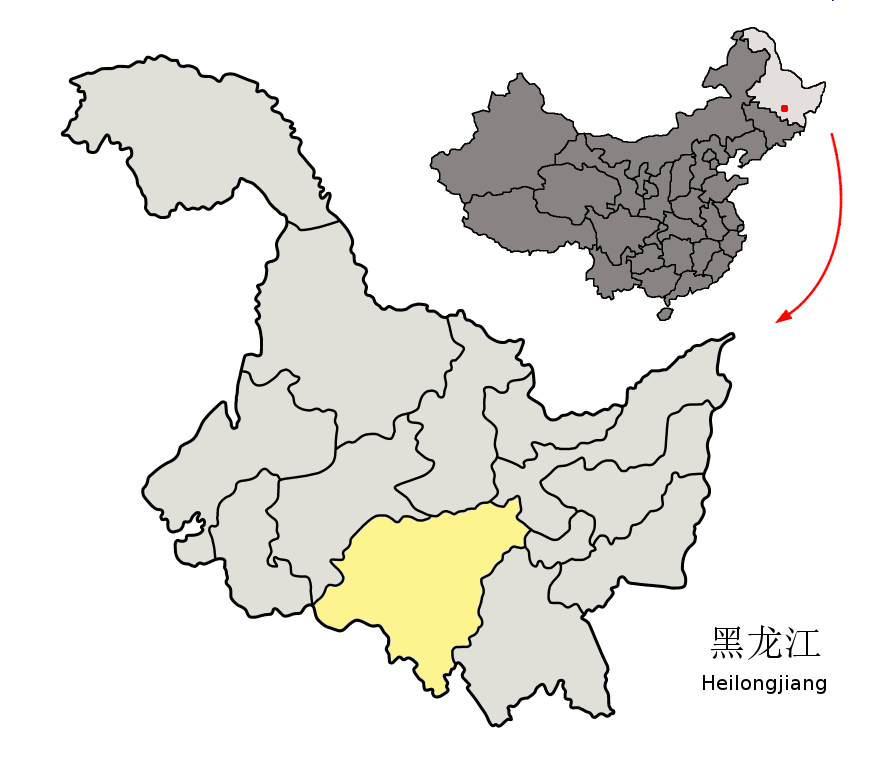
- Harbin in Heilongjiang
- Coordinates: 45°32′12″N 126°58′02″E
- Country: People's Republic of China
- Province: Heilongjiang
- Sub-provincial city: Harbin
- Subdivisions: 9 subdistricts 8 towns 1 township 1 ethnic township
- Seat: Jincheng Subdistrict (金城街道)

Area
  - Total: 2,452.1 km^{2} (946.8 sq mi)

Population (2018)
  - Total: 544,514
  - Density: 222.06/km^{2} (575.13/sq mi)
- Time zone: UTC+8 (China Standard)
- Postal code: 1503XX
- Area code: 0451

Acheng, Harbin
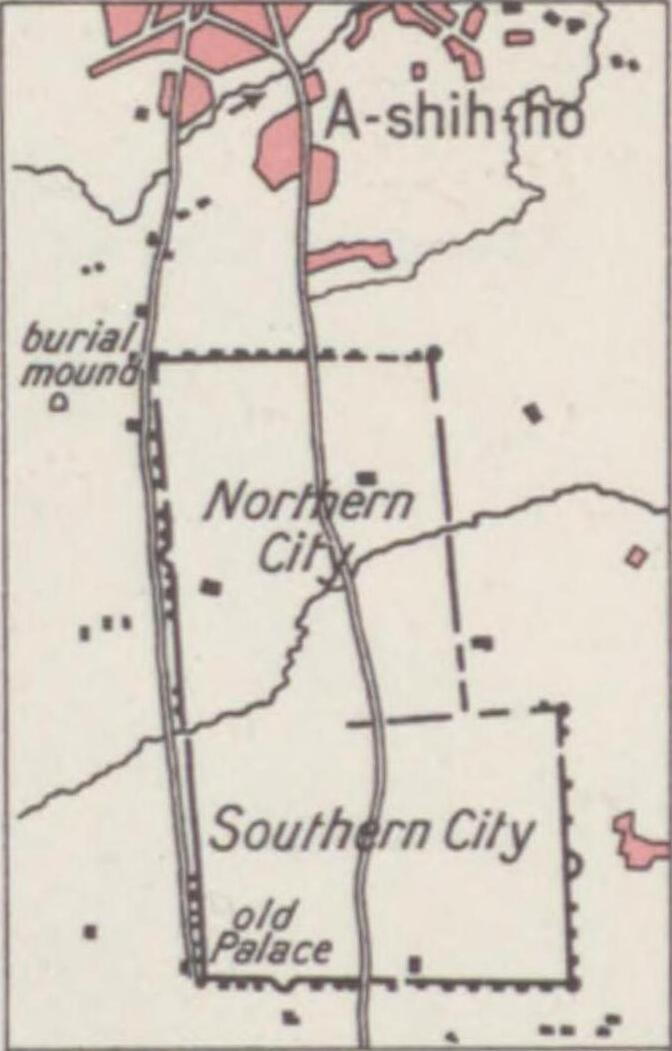
- 1935 map of the ruins of Huiningfu, showing the modern town's name as A-shih-ho

Chinese name
- Traditional Chinese: 阿城區
- Simplified Chinese: 阿城区
- Literal meaning: Ashi City District
Transcriptions
Standard Mandarin
- Hanyu Pinyin: Àchéng Qū
- Wade–Giles: A-ch'êng Ch'ü

Ashihe
- Chinese: 阿什河
- Literal meaning: [City by] the Ashi River
Transcriptions
Standard Mandarin
- Hanyu Pinyin: Āshíhé
- Wade–Giles: A-shih-ho

Manchu name
- Manchu script: ᠠᠯᠴᡠᡴᠠ ᠴᡳᠣᡳ
- Romanization: Alchuka cioi

Acheng District (Manchu: Alcuka Hoton) is one of nine districts of the prefecture-level city of Harbin, the capital of Heilongjiang Province, Northeast China, covering part of the southeastern suburbs. The district was approved to establish from the former Acheng City (阿城市) by the Chinese State Council on August 15, 2006. As of 2010, it had a population of 596,856 residing in an area of 2,680 km^{2} (1,030 sq mi) (Note: Some sources give an area of 2,452.1 km^{2} (946.8 sq mi).), and is 29 km (18 mi) southeast of downtown Harbin, 190 km (120 mi) north of Jilin City, and around 50 km (31 mi) south of the Songhua River. It lies within the basin of and until 1909 was considered synonymous with the Ashi River which gave its name to the Jurchen Jin Dynasty. The district administers nine subdistricts, eight towns, one township, and one ethnic township. It borders Daowai District to the north, Bin County to the northeast, Shangzhi to the southeast, and Wuchang to the south, Shuangcheng District to the west, and Pingfang and Xiangfang Districts to the northwest.

== History ==
Acheng was known to medieval China as Huining Prefecture, an area of Shangjing. Its eponymous seat served as the first capital of the Jurchen Jin Dynasty (1122–1234) and served as a subsidiary capital from 1173 until their conquest by the Mongolian Empire. There is currently a museum at the site, about 2 km (1.2 mi) south of the Acheng urban area.

Acheng County was established in 1909. It was designated a county-level city in 1987 and turned into a district of Harbin on October 9, 2006.

== Climate ==
Climate data for Acheng, elevation 168 m (551 ft), (1991–2020 normals, extremes 1981–2010)
Month	Jan	Feb	Mar	Apr	May	Jun	Jul	Aug	Sep	Oct	Nov	Dec	Year
Record high °C (°F)	2.2 (36.0)	9.3 (48.7)	19.8 (67.6)	29.9 (85.8)	34.7 (94.5)	39.2 (102.6)	36.3 (97.3)	35.5 (95.9)	30.6 (87.1)	26.8 (80.2)	18.0 (64.4)	8.5 (47.3)	39.2 (102.6)
Mean daily maximum °C (°F)	−12.2 (10.0)	−6.3 (20.7)	2.8 (37.0)	13.8 (56.8)	21.3 (70.3)	26.3 (79.3)	27.9 (82.2)	26.5 (79.7)	21.5 (70.7)	12.4 (54.3)	−0.1 (31.8)	−10.0 (14.0)	10.3 (50.6)
Daily mean °C (°F)	−18.2 (−0.8)	−12.9 (8.8)	−3.1 (26.4)	7.4 (45.3)	15.0 (59.0)	20.7 (69.3)	23.1 (73.6)	21.4 (70.5)	15.1 (59.2)	6.2 (43.2)	−5.3 (22.5)	−15.4 (4.3)	4.5 (40.1)
Mean daily minimum °C (°F)	−23.4 (−10.1)	−18.9 (−2.0)	−8.9 (16.0)	1.0 (33.8)	8.7 (47.7)	15.3 (59.5)	18.6 (65.5)	16.8 (62.2)	9.3 (48.7)	0.7 (33.3)	−9.9 (14.2)	−20.3 (−4.5)	−0.9 (30.4)
Record low °C (°F)	−37.5 (−35.5)	−38.5 (−37.3)	−27.6 (−17.7)	−13.0 (8.6)	−3.3 (26.1)	4.5 (40.1)	8.8 (47.8)	7.2 (45.0)	−4.5 (23.9)	−18.7 (−1.7)	−28.8 (−19.8)	−35.2 (−31.4)	−38.5 (−37.3)
Average precipitation mm (inches)	3.7 (0.15)	5.0 (0.20)	11.4 (0.45)	20.7 (0.81)	58.6 (2.31)	94.5 (3.72)	143.2 (5.64)	114.7 (4.52)	57.4 (2.26)	27.4 (1.08)	14.9 (0.59)	7.5 (0.30)	559 (22.03)
Average precipitation days (≥ 0.1 mm)	4.9	3.9	5.9	7.1	11.7	13.7	14.5	12.9	9.6	7.1	6.2	6.4	103.9
Average snowy days	8.6	7.1	8.0	3.1	0.1	0	0	0	0	2.3	8.0	10.2	47.4
Average relative humidity (%)	73	67	58	50	55	67	78	80	72	64	67	73	67
Mean monthly sunshine hours	173.3	198.5	236.2	233.4	245.5	247.1	227.7	223.3	231.6	196.8	157.7	152.5	2,523.6
Percentage possible sunshine	61	67	64	57	53	53	49	52	62	59	56	57	58
Source: China Meteorological Administration

== Population ==
Year	Urban population	Total population
1989		188,600
1994	219,500	631,700
2010		596,856

== Administrative divisions ==
Acheng is divided into fifteen subdistricts and four towns:

Subdistricts:

- Jincheng Subdistrict (金城街道), Jindou Subdistrict (金都街道), Tongcheng Subdistrict (通城街道), Hedong Subdistrict (河东街道), Ashenhe Subdistrict (阿什河街道), Sheli Subdistrict (舍利街道), Xinli Subdistrict (新利街道), Shuangfeng Subdistrict (双丰街道), Yuquan Subdistrict (玉泉街道), Xiaoling Subdistrict (小岭街道), Yagou Subdistrict (亚沟街道), Jiaojie Subdistrict (交界街道), Liaodian Subdistrict (料甸街道), Feiketu Subdistrict (蜚克图街道), Yangshu Subdistrict (杨树街道)

Towns:

- Pingshan (平山镇), Songfengshan (松峰山镇), Hongxing (红星镇), Jinlongshan (金龙山镇)

== Commerce ==
The area is rich in mineral resources, including sources of rock, volcanic rock, granite, molybdenum, zinc, lead, iron, and copper.

The agricultural strengths of the area are grain production and cattle. Grain production is strong, having produced 33,100 tons of grain in 2002; much of this grain is essential in feeding the important city of Harbin.

Acheng is a major industrial area for Heilongjiang, with over 300 types of enterprises, including textile, electromechanics, food, building materials (especially brickworks), metallurgy, breweries fueled by the local grain, sugar refineries, a flax plant, iron, steel, and the production of medicine. In 1996 a new technology industrial development zone was created on the western side of the city to encourage the development of high technology, export-oriented industry.

Tourism is also a growing part of the local economy. Acheng is located on the popular tourist route serving Harbin, the Yabuli Ski Resort, Jingpo Lake, and Xingkai Lake. A number of historic and nature reserves in the area also attract visitors.

== Transport ==
Acheng District is a 50 km (31 mi) drive from Harbin Taiping International Airport.

The Harbin–Suifenhe Railway (part of the original Chinese Eastern Railway) passes through the district. There are over twenty commuter rail lines in the rural area. The station is Acheng Railway Station.

G10 Suifenhe–Manzhouli Expressway and China National Highway 301 both connect the district to downtown Harbin.
