= Hedong Subdistrict, Harbin =

Hedong Subdistrict 河东街道
- Subdistrict
- Location in Heilongjiang Hedong (China)
- Coordinates: 45°33′27″N 127°00′51″E
- Country: People's Republic of China
- Province: Heilongjiang
- Sub-provincial city: Harbin
- District: Acheng
- Village-level divisions: 8 residential communities
- Elevation: 141 m (463 ft)
- Time zone: UTC+8 (China Standard)
- Area code: 0451

Hedong Subdistrict (simplified Chinese: 河东街道; traditional Chinese: 河東街道; pinyin: Hédōng Jiēdào; lit. 'river east') is a subdistrict of eastern Acheng District, in the southeastern suburbs of Harbin, People's Republic of China. As of 2018, it has eight residential communities (社区) under its administration.

== See also ==
- List of township-level divisions of Heilongjiang
