= Huiningfu =

Prefecture in ancient China

Coordinates: 45.501°N 126.974°E

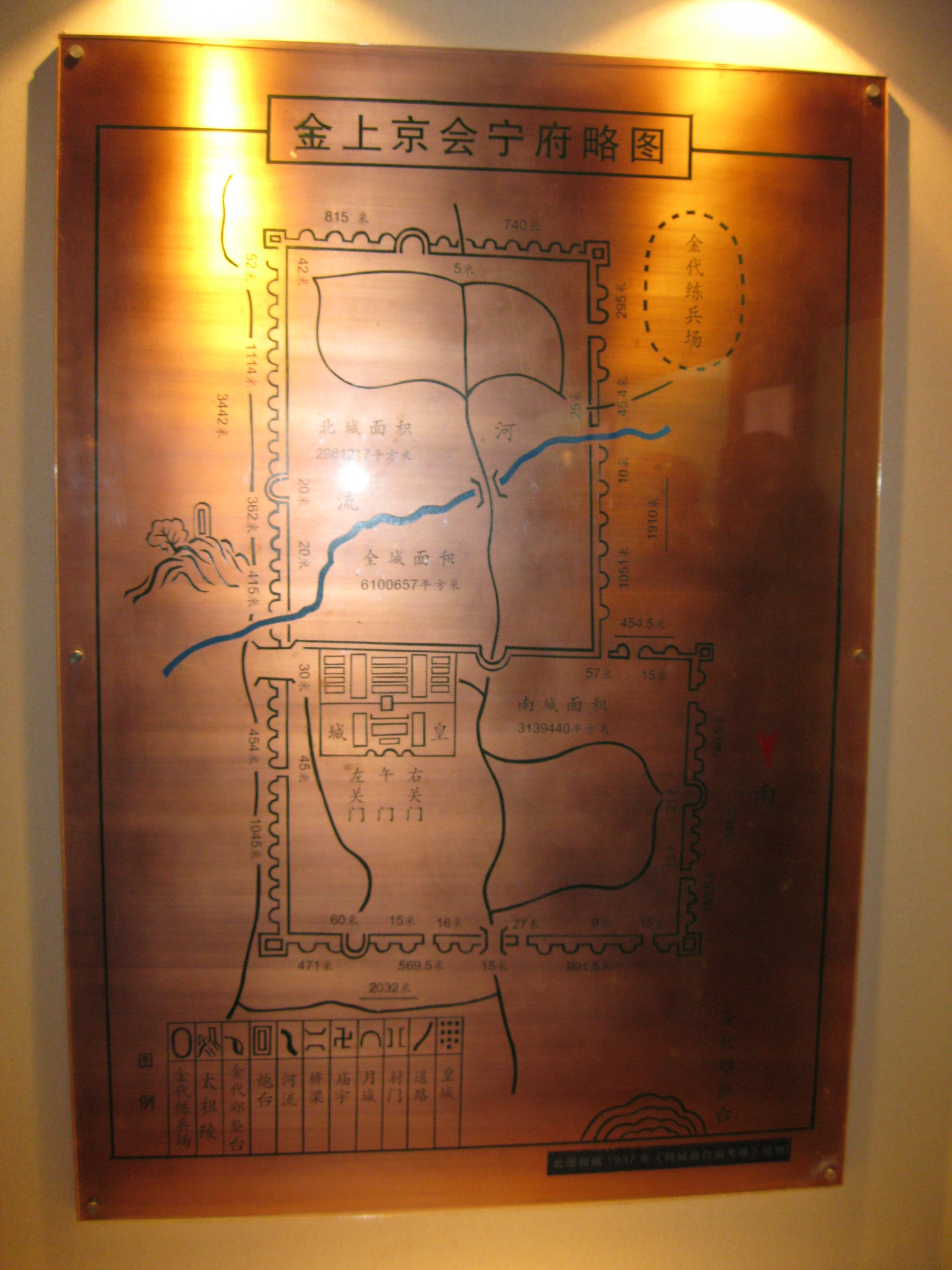
Plan of Huining Prefecture

Huining Fu (simplified Chinese: 会宁府; traditional Chinese: 會寧府; pinyin: Huìníng Fǔ), or Shangjing Huiningfu (上京會寧府; 'Upper Capital', 'Huining Prefecture'), was a Fu in the Shangjing region of Manchuria. It served as the first superior capital of the Jurchen-led Jin dynasty (1115-1234) from 1122 to 1153 (and was a secondary capital after 1173). Its location was in present-day Acheng District, Harbin, Heilongjiang Province.

== History ==
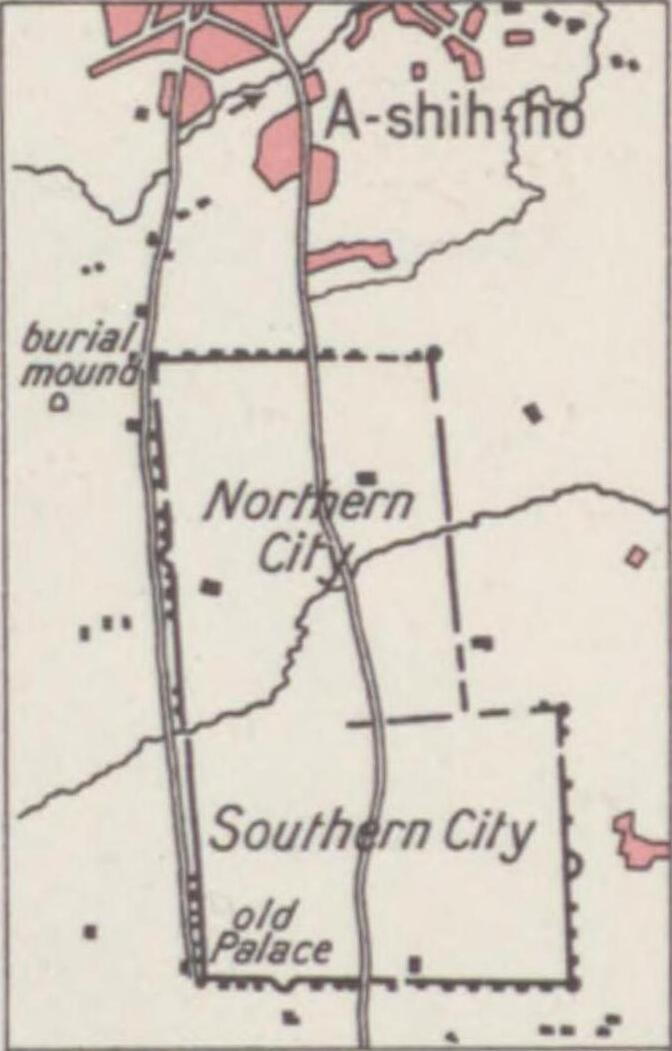
The Ruins of Huining according to V.Y. Tolmachev (1935)

During the early years of building up their empire, Jurchen rulers often moved people from elsewhere in China to their capital, Shangjing. The first emperor of the Jurchen-led Jin dynasty, Aguda (Emperor Taizu) (r. 1115–1123) resettled captives to the Shangjing area during his war against the Khitan-led Liao dynasty. Aguda's successor, Wuqimai (Emperor Taizong) (r. 1123–1134) conquered most of northern China in the wars against the Han-led Northern Song dynasty. He continued the policy, resulting in numerous wealthy people, skilled craftsmen from Yanjing (present-day Beijing) and the former Song capital, Bianjing (present-day Kaifeng), being relocated to Shangjing. Historical accounts report that, after the fall of Bianjing in 1127, the Jurchen generals brought to Shangjing (and elsewhere in North China) several thousand of people, including: "about 470 imperial clansmen; erudites and students of the imperial academy; eunuchs; medical doctors; artisans; prostitutes; imperial gardeners; artisans of imperial constructions; actors and actresses; astronomers; musicians". A variety of valuable goods captured in Bianjing was brought to the Jin capital as well.

In Aguda's days, palaces were not much more than tents, but in 1123, the Jurchens built their first ancestral temples and tombs (where the captured Song emperors Huizong and Qinzong were to venerate the Jin emperors' ancestors in 1128), and in 1124 the Jin dynasty's Emperor Taizong ordered a Han architect, Lu Yanlun, build a new city on uniform plan. The city plan on Shangjing emulated major Chinese cities, in particular Bianjing, although the Jin capital was much smaller than its Northern Song prototype.

The capital was moved to Yanjing (present-day Beijing) in 1153 by Wanyan Liang, the fourth emperor of the Jin dynasty. Yanjing was more centrally located within the Jin Empire, and it was easier to supply it with food. Wanyan Liang is said to have support of most of his officials in this move. In 1157, Wanyan Liang even went so far as to destroy all palaces in his former capital.

While Yanjing and later Bianjing were the Jin dynasty's principal capitals thereafter, Shangjing continued to sometimes play an important role in the Jin Empire. Wanyan Liang's successor, Emperor Shizong, who strove to revive Jurchen language and culture, spent a year in Shangjing from 1184-85, greatly enjoying hunting, traditional dancing, and speaking in Jurchen.

== Modern state ==
Ruins of the city were discovered and excavated in present-day Acheng District, Harbin City, Heilongjiang Province, about 2 km from Acheng District's central urban area. The site of the ruins is a national historical heritage site, and includes a museum open to the public, renovated in the late 2005. Many of the artifacts found there are on display in Harbin.
