= Acheng railway station =

Railway station in Harbin, China

Acheng 阿城

General information
- Other names: Acheng
- Location: Harbin, Heilongjiang; China
- Coordinates: 45.5495°N 126.9896°E
- Operated by: China Railway Corporation
- Line(s): Harbin–Suifenhe

Acheng railway station is a railway station of Harbin–Suifenhe Railway and located in the Acheng District of Harbin, Heilongjiang province, China. It was built in 1899.

== See also ==
- Chinese Eastern Railway
- South Manchuria Railway
- South Manchuria Railway Zone
