= China Railways SS9 =

Chinese electric locomotive class

SS9 韶山9
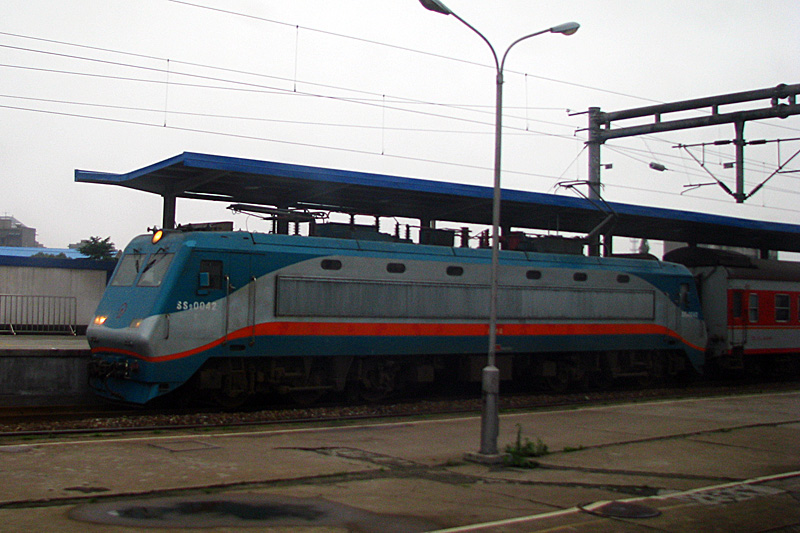
- SS9-0042
Type and origin
- Power type: Electric
- Builder: Zhuzhou Electric Locomotive Works
- Model: SS_{9}
- Build date: 1998–2006
- Total produced: 214 (as of 2006)
Specifications
- Configuration
  - UIC: Co′Co′
- Gauge: 1,435 mm (4 ft 8 1/2 in)
- Length: 22,216 mm (72 ft 11 in)
- Width: 3,100 mm (10 ft 2 in)
- Height: 4,754 mm (15 ft 7 in)
- Loco weight: 126 tonnes (124 long tons; 139 short tons)
- Electric system/s: 25 kV 50 Hz AC Catenary
- Current pickup: Pantograph
Performance figures
- Maximum speed: 170 km/h (106 mph)
- Power output: 5,400 kW (7,240 hp) maximum 4,800 kW (6,440 hp) continuous
- Tractive effort: 286 kN (64,300 lbf) starting 169 kN (37,990 lbf) continuous at 99 km/h (62 mph)
Career
- Operators: China Railway
- Nicknames: 青蛙 (Frog; First generation version) 烧酒 (Baijiu liquor; Modified version)

The Shaoshan 9 (Chinese: 韶山9) is a type of electric locomotive used on the People's Republic of China's national railway system. They are mainly used in pulling sub-highspeed passenger trains. Developed and built by Zhuzhou Electric Locomotive Works, the SS9 was designed for the fifth national railway speedup, and 2 prototypes were completed on December 26, 1998.

== Modified version ==
Zhuzhou built 43 first generation SS9's. Beginning in 2002, a modified version of the SS9 was designed and built. A total of 173 (0004 & 0044～0213) SS9s have been built.

== Accident ==
Number SS9-0004 was scrapped and replaced by a new modified one due to a derailment accident which occurred on November 19, 2004.

== Gallery ==
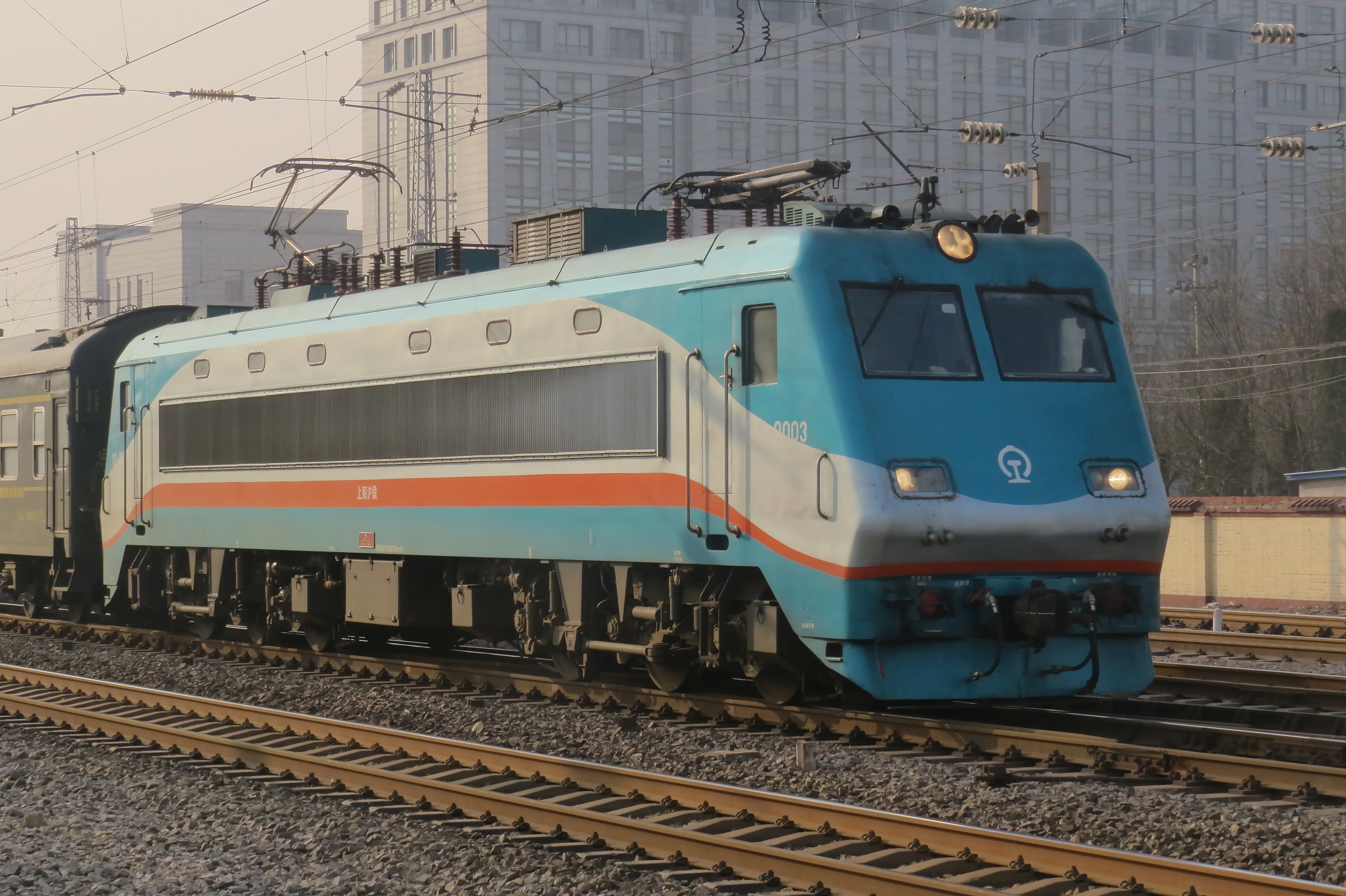
SS9-0003

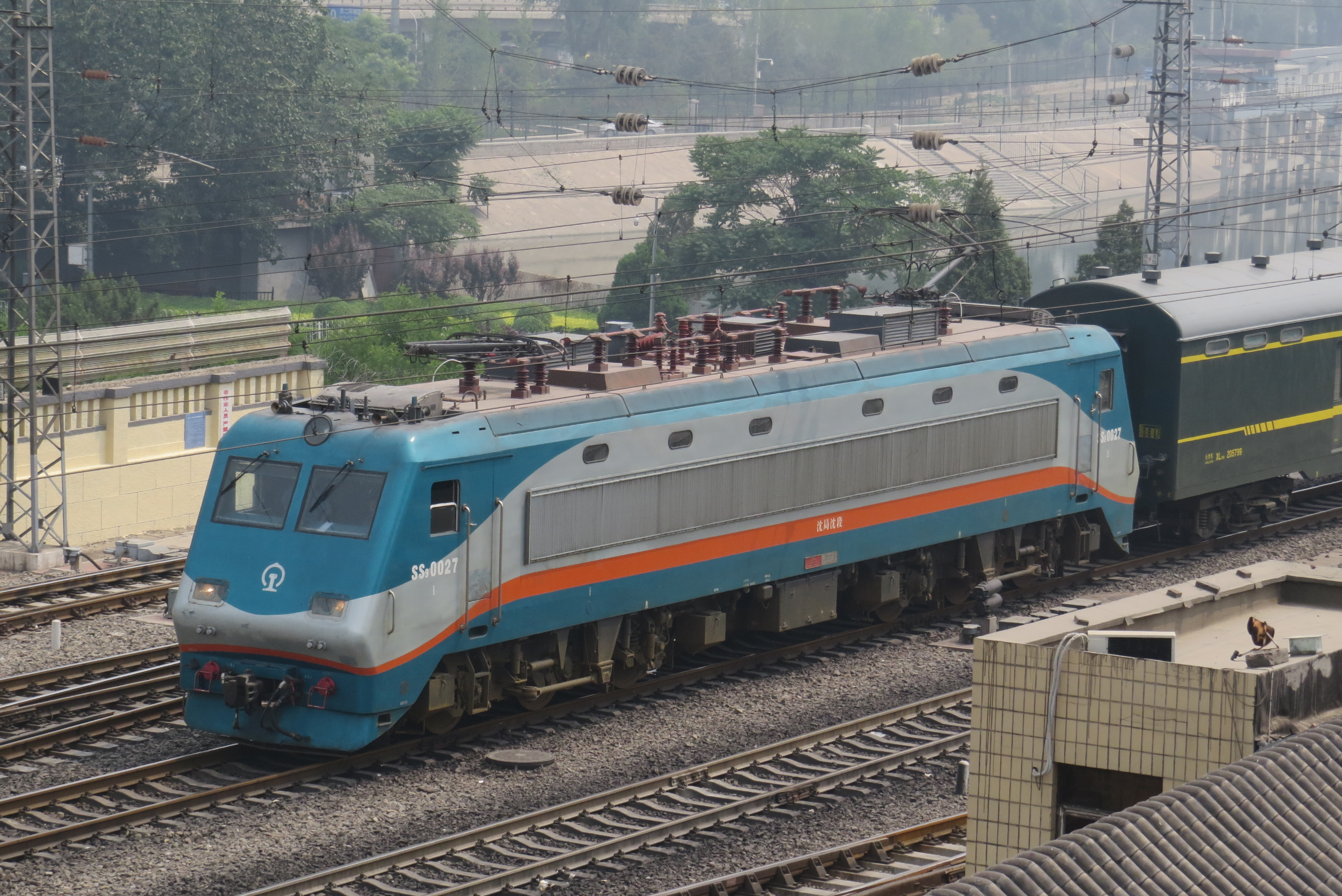
SS9-0027

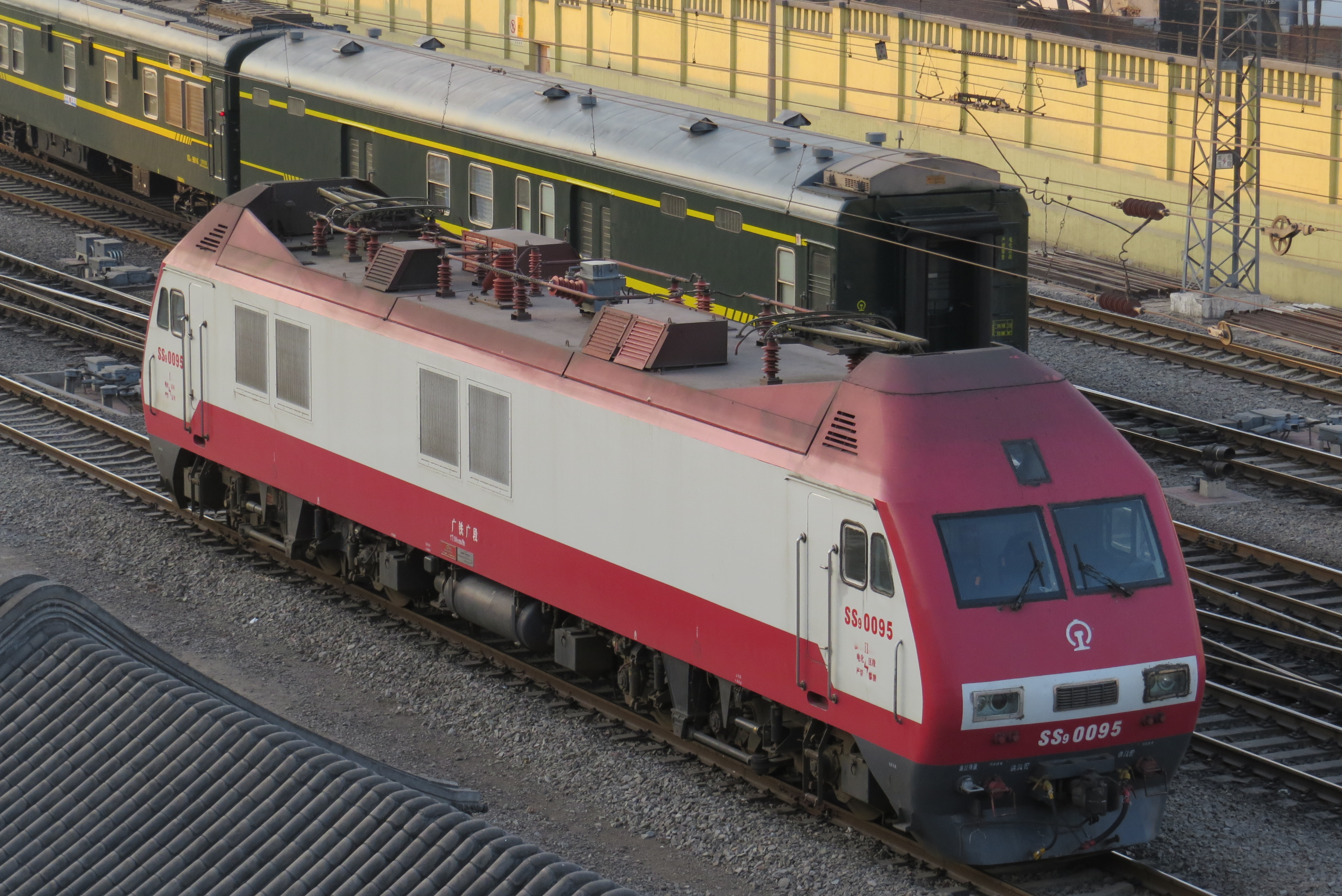
SS9(G)-0095

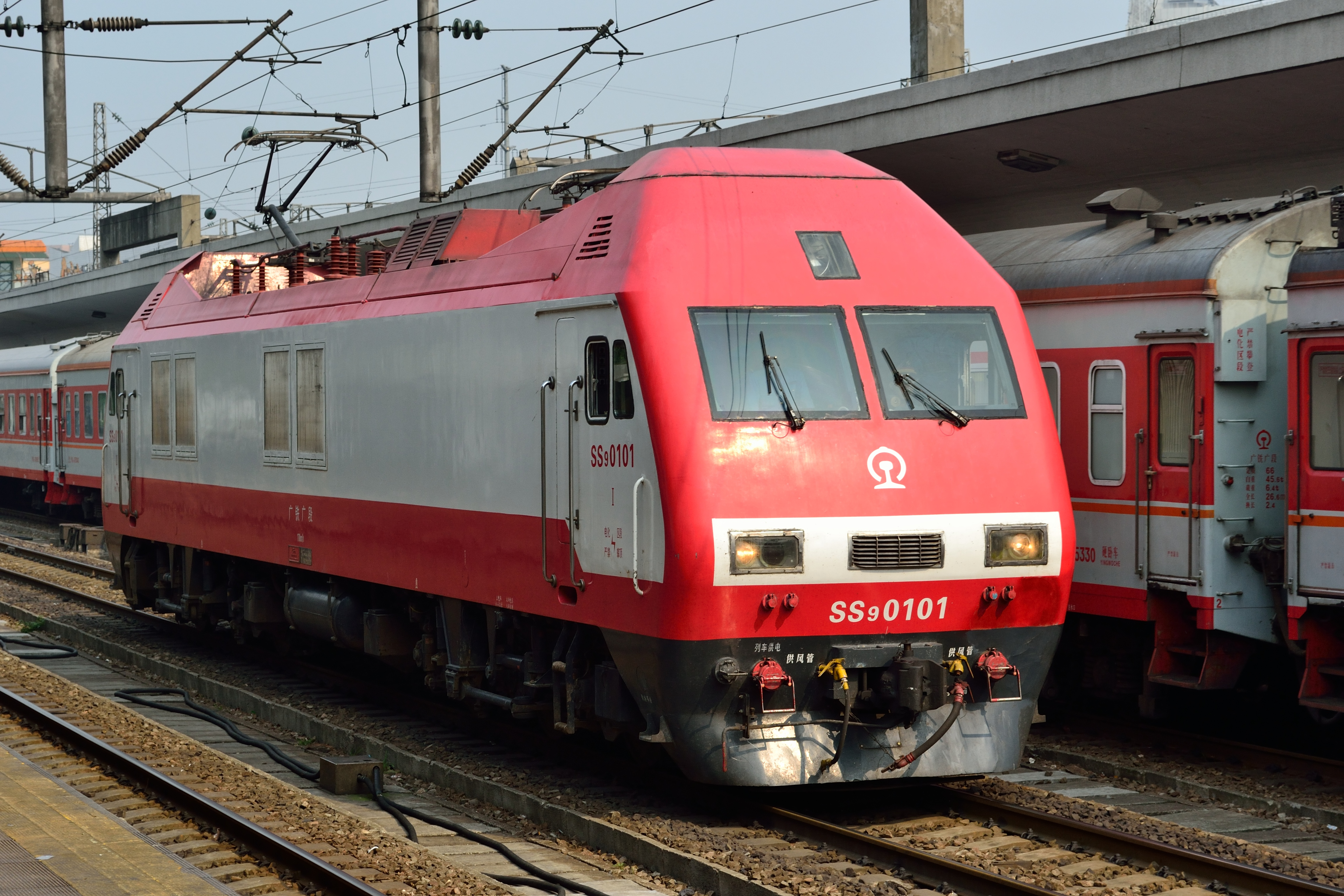
SS9(G)-0101 in Guangzhou railway station.

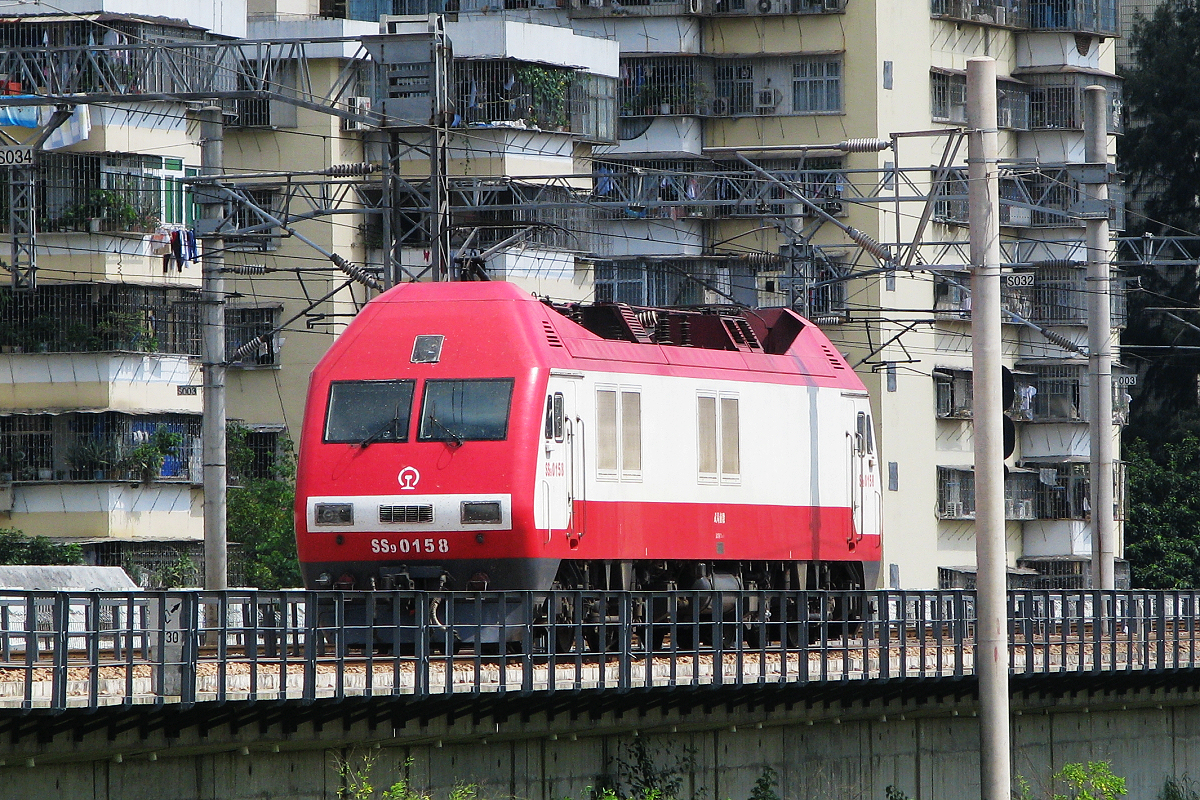
SS9(G)-0158

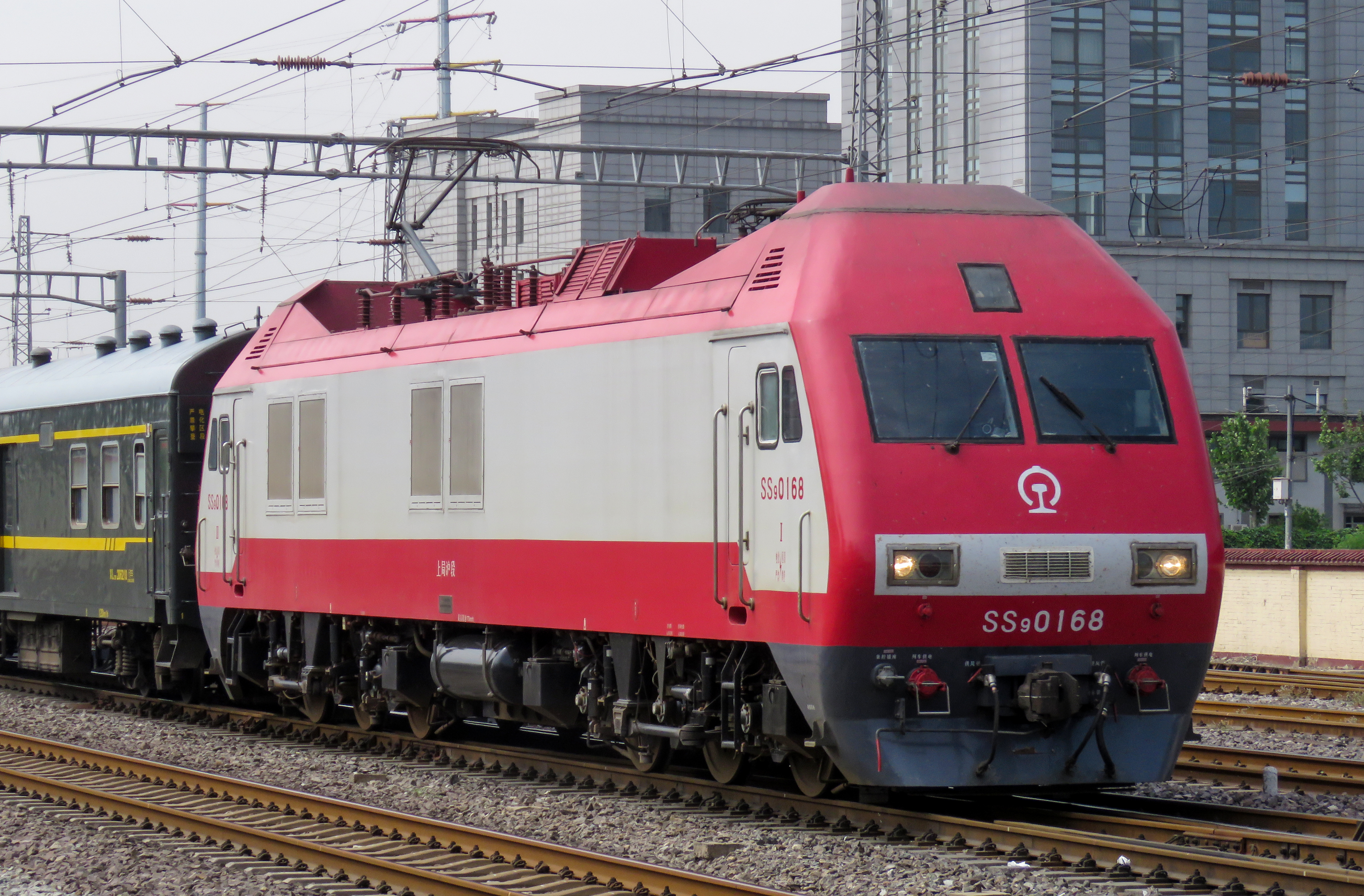
SS9(G)-0168
