= Tianjin North railway station =

Railway station in Tianjin, China

Coordinates: 39°09′59″N 117°12′35″E

Tianjinbei 天津北
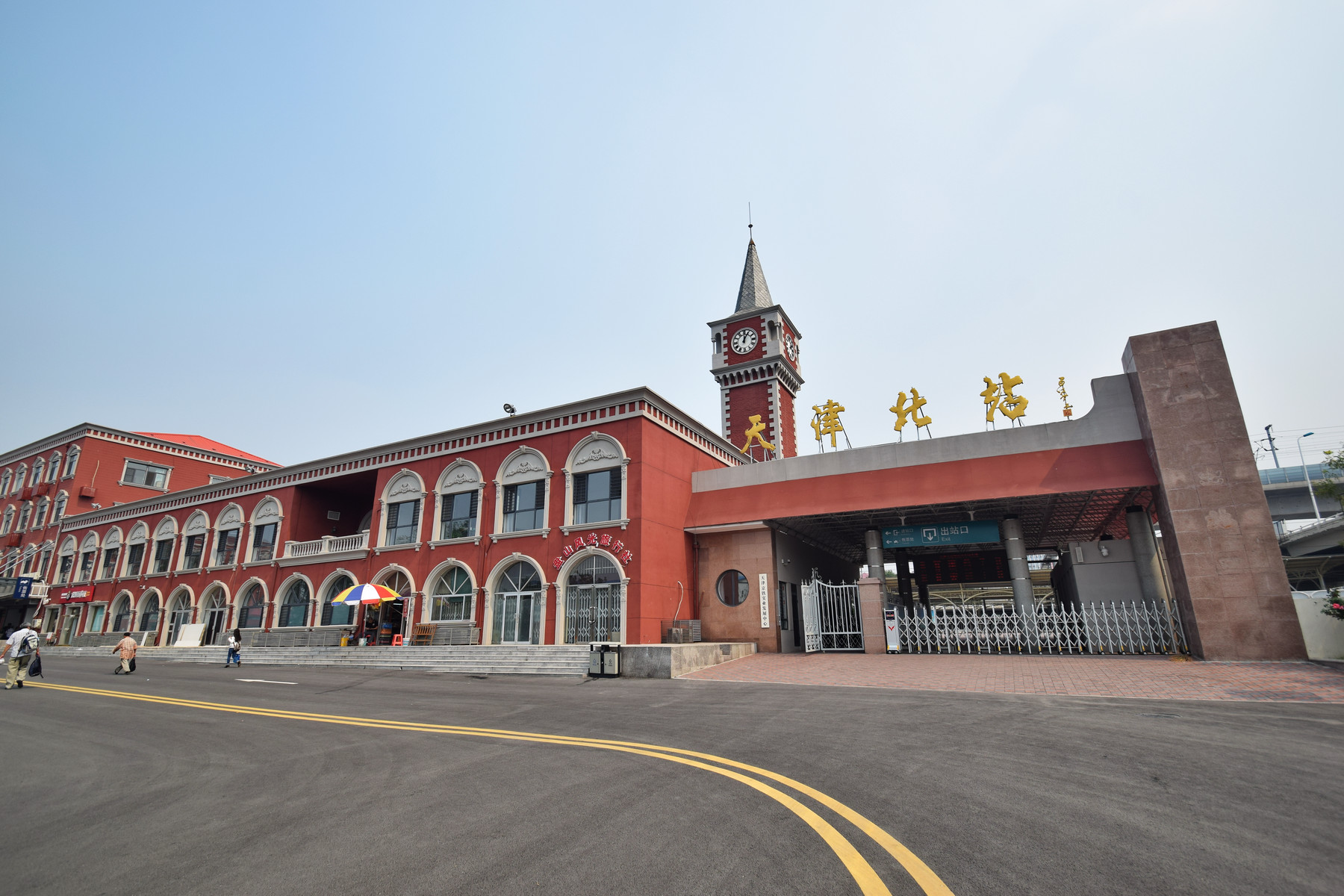

General information
- Other names: Tianjin North
- Location: China
- Lines: Tianjin–Shanhaiguan Railway; Tianjin–Jizhou Railway
- Platforms: 3 (main line; 2 island platforms, 1 side platform; 4 (metro; 2 island platforms)
- Connections: Bus terminal

Services
Preceding station	Tianjin Metro	Following station
Zhongshanlu towards Nanzhan	Line 3	Tiedonglu towards Xiaodian
Location

Tianjin North railway station is a station in Hebei District, Tianjin on the Tianjin–Shanhaiguan Railway. The station opened in 1903 and was closed for renovation between April 1, 2014 to April 30, 2015 and reopened accepting regional rail services to Jizhou. The Beijing–Tianjin intercity railway passes beside the station but does not stop in it. Connections are available to Tianjin Metro Line 3 and Line 6 via Beizhan Station.

== See also ==
- Transport in Tianjin
- Tianjin West railway station
- Tianjin railway station

== Notes and references ==
Preceding station	China Railway	Following station
Terminus	Tianjin–Shanhaiguan railway	Tianjin towards Shanhaiguan
Tianjin Terminus	Tianjin–Jizhou railway	Caozili towards Jizhou North
