= Tianjin–Jizhou railway =

Railway line in Tianjin, China

Tianjin–Jizhou railway or Jinji railway (simplified Chinese: 津蓟铁路; traditional Chinese: 津薊鐵路; pinyin: Jīnjì Tiělù) is a 92 km long minor railway line in China connecting urban Tianjin and Jizhou. In 2015, a number of regional rail services referred as Line S9 started operating on the line.

== Stations for passenger services ==
Station No.	Station Name		Connections	Distance km	Location	Section
Station No.	English	Chinese	Connections	Distance km	Location	Section
TJP	Tianjin	天津	Jingjin		Hedong	Tianjin–Shanhaiguan railway
TBP	Tianjin North; Tianjinbei	天津北	Tianjin Metro (Tianjin Metro Group Co., Ltd.) Tianjin Metro Line 3 Tianjin Metro Line 6		Hebei	Tianjin–Shanhaiguan railway
CFP	Caozili	曹子里			Wuqing	Tianjin–Jizhou railway
CHP	Cuihuangkou	崔黄口			Wuqing	Tianjin–Jizhou railway
DKP	Dakoutun	大口屯			Baodi	Tianjin–Jizhou railway
BPP	Baodi North; Baodibei	宝坻北			Baodi	Tianjin–Jizhou railway
ECP	Xiacang	下仓			Jizhou	Tianjin–Jizhou railway
SKP	Shangcang	上仓			Jizhou	Tianjin–Jizhou railway
JKP	Jizhou North; Jizhoubei	蓟州北			Jizhou	Tianjin–Jizhou railway

- Stations don't provide passenger services, but freight transports: Nancang, 129 Gongli, Beicang, Hangouzhen, Xinzhuang, Yangxinzhuang

== See also ==
- Transport in Tianjin
