= List of rail accidents in China =

This is a list of rail accidents in China.

== 19th century ==
Location	Date	Number	Start	Finish	Type	Deaths	Injuries	Description	Ref.
Tianjin	25 March 1889					15+		Collision of a passenger train with a truck loaded with kerosene.	

== 20th century ==
Location	Date	Number	Start	Finish	Type	Deaths	Injuries	Description	Ref.
Nunkouyu	23 November 1908					16		A train derailed on a bridge and fell into the river.	
Lichiatsai	February 1910					10+		Runaway coaches crashed into a freight train.	
Guangzhou	December 1910					31	111	Collision of a passenger train with a luggage train.	
Changsha	January 1918					300		A train carrying retreating troops was ordered to dispatch and crashed into an oncoming train.	
Hankou	May 1926					50		A freight train travelling from Beijing to Hankou derailed, killing passengers that were travelling on top of the waggons.	
Anting	August 1926					20		A train derailed due to sabotage.	
Bengbu	13 April 1928					10+		A passenger train collided with an empty military train while crossing a bridge and plunged into the Fei river.	
Fengtian, Mukden	4 June 1928		Beijing	Mukden	Passenger	2		Huanggutun incident	
Jinzhou	December 1930					100+		A passenger train plunged down an 80 feet high embankment between Jinzhou and Chaoyang.	
Hankou	February 1931								
Shenzhen	20 April 1931					12	20	A train ran down an embankment.	
Liaoning, Mukden	18 September 1931					365+		Mukden Incident	
Jaoyangho, Liaoning	26 September 1931					30		A train travelling from Mukden to Beijing was derailed and looted by bandits. Some, such as Kuomintang-ran Leader newspaper, purported that track was ripped up by plain-clothes Japanese soldiers, and that the "bandits" were in fact Koreans working for Japan; the Leader argued that the Kwantung Army sought to use it as a pretext to extend their "protection" to the Peiping-Mukden Railway.	
Yaplonya	May 1932					40	100	A train crowded with refugees collided with a freight train.	
Harbin	11 September 1932							A train was derailed and looted by bandits.	
Jiangxi	August 1933					200		A train transporting troops crashed into a river between Nanchang and Lushang.	
Zalantun	November 1933					20+	20+	A Japanese troop train on its way from Harbin to Manzhouli derailed and crashed into a valley.	
Huangtaohotze	19 April 1934							Derailment of a Japanese troop train.	
Suizhong	1 January 1935					12	30	A Japanese troop train crashed down a valley in occupied Manchukuo territory.	
Tengchatang	22 October 1936					60	100	Runaway coaches crashed into a train.	
Sheklung, Guangzhou	17 January 1937					100	50	Fire on a passenger train.	
Sishihpo	8 November 1937							Japanese air raid on a passenger train.	
Guangdong	2 January 1938					10	10	A train derailed between Lehtung and Wangshih due to subsidence of the roadbed.	
Milokang, Hunan	16 May 1938					100+	100	Collision of a passenger train with a freight train.	
Songjiang Town	8 September 1938					300	400	Japanese air raid on a train carrying refugees.	
Haiphong	2 February 1940					101	120	Japanese air raid on a passenger train between Yunnan and Haiphong.	
Suzhou	29 November 1940					100	205	Bombing of rail tracks by Chinese guerillas.	
Hunan	30 May 1946					90	60+	A train travelling from Canton to Hankou plunged into a river when crossing the Shaochi bridge.	
Tianjin	May 1947					100		Bombing of rail tracks by Communist guerrillas.	
Yingtan	10 July 1947					21	56	A train derailed and plunged into a river.	
Shumchun, Guangdong	2 September 1948					25	98	A train derailed probably due to sabotage.	
Bengbu	September 1948					100		Bombing of rail tracks by Communist guerrillas.	
Zhuzhou	22 April 1949					11	10	A train derailed.	
Guangzhou	29 September 1949					24	30		
Tianjin	January 1950					17	60	Two trains collided on the Tianjin–Pukou Railway.	
Liaoning, Suizhong	22 July 1959	12	Shenyang	Beijing	Passenger	0	0	Flood	
Fangshan District	7 December 1971					14	22	Collision between a passenger train and a truck.	
Liaoning, Haicheng	4 February 1975	31	Dalian	Beijing	Passenger	0	0	Haicheng earthquake	
Hebei, Tangshan	28 July 1976	40	Qiqihar	Beijing	Passenger	0	0	Tangshan earthquake	
Tianjin, Tanggu	28 July 1976	117	Jining	Sankeshu	Passenger	0	0	Tangshan earthquake	
Yangzhuang, Lujiang County	16 December 1978					106	218	Collision of two passenger trains.	
Heilongjiang	11 February 1979					100+		A train crashed into a standing passenger train due to excessive speed.	
Zhuzhou	22 January 1980					22	4		
Ganluo County	9 July 1981					200+	146	1981 Chengdu–Kunming rail crash	
Chaoyang Village	20 October 1981					3	65	Explosion.	
Liaoning, Xinmin	28 May 1982	193	Jinan	Jiamusi	Passenger	3	147	When the railway workers were doing the repair work of jointless track there, they violated the labor discipline and operating procedures, set up the track lifter on the inner side of the steel rail without authorization, and then withdrew from their posts. They went to the crossing guard room five meters away from the operation site to eat popsicles. When the 193 through passenger express train passed, they collided with the track lifter, causing the train to derail and overturn.	
Jiangsu, Nanjing	6 November 1983	155	Sankeshu	Shanghai North	Passenger	1	31	Rear end collision.	
Liaoning, Xinmin	14 May 1984	117	Jining	Sankeshu	Passenger	6	22	Fire on the train.	
Hunan	February 1985					13	4	A train crashed into a group of people crossing the tracks.	
Shaoguan	15 January 1986					7	38	Explosion on an express train.	
Heilongjiang	22 April 1987					11	44	Explosion on an express train.	
Mengmiao	18 July 1987					9	69	Explosion on a passenger train.	
Matianxu, Hunan	7 January 1988					34	30	Fire on a passenger train.	
	17 January 1988					19	76	Collision of a passenger train.	
Yunnan	24 January 1988					90	67	A train derailed and overturned between Qiewu and Dengjiacun.	
Nanxiang	24 March 1988					29	100	Collision of two express trains.	
Liaoning	23 December 1988					46	54	A train crashed into a bus at a crossing.	
Huinan	18 January 1989					32	41	A passenger train crashed into a bus at a crossing.	
Shanghai	26 June 1989					24	39	Suicide bombing of a passenger train.	
Guokou, Jiangsu	18 September 1991					13		A freight train crashed into a group of railway workers due to fog.	
Wulidun, Zhuzhou	21 March 1992					15	25	Collision of a passenger train with a freight train.	
Liaoning, Fushun	11 October 1992	285	Tianjin	Jilin	Passenger; Freight	4	0	Dongfeng 4C diesel locomotives No. 4031 and 4045 in Meihekou locomotive depot are reconnected to draw a freight train to Shimenling railway station, ready to stop the 285 passenger train that will allow. As a corner cock of the train was closed, the train brake failed. In order to avoid train collision, the freight train derailed and overturned after entering the safety line of Shimenling station. The accident resulted in the death of four locomotive attendants, the suspension of driving for 10 hours and 25 minutes, and the scrapping of two locomotives, and no loss of 285 passenger train.	
Liaoning	31 January 1993					66	28	A passenger train crashed into a bus at a crossing.	
Liaoning	30 April 1993					35		A train crashed into a bus carrying schoolchildren.	
	10 July 1993					40	48	Due to the illegal driving of the train driver, a passenger train and another freight train had a rear-end collision.	
Xiangfan passenger section	15 January 1994					8	23	7 passengers and 1 worker killed. 12 passengers and 11 workers injured	
Guangxi	13 August 1994					12	50	Explosion on a passenger train travelling from Zhanjiang to Guilin.	
Beijing	20 October 1994					17	12+	A train crashed into a bus at a crossing.	
Heilongjiang	1 February 1996	193	Jinan East	Jiamusi	Passenger	1	0	Zhang, the steward of the 193 through passenger train, treated the elderly female passenger rudely, which indirectly led to her illness.	
Rongjiawan, Yueyang	29 April 1997					126	230	Rongjiawan train disaster: Collision of two passenger trains.	
Jilin, Changchun	28 August 1997	472	Harbin	Xuzhou	Passenger; Freight	4	9	The driver of freight train 3312 dozed off.	
Central China	September 1998					27	4	A train collided with a bus carrying guests of a wedding party.	
Liaoning	January 1999					24	100	Collision of a freight train with a passenger train.	
Hengyang	19 July 1999					9	40	Derailment of a passenger train.	

== 21st century ==
Location	Date	Number	Start	Finish	Type	Deaths	Injuries	Description	Ref.
Jilin, Fuyu	14 April 2002	1417	Harbin	Heze	Passenger; Freight	0	0	The driver of 22927 freight train forgot to disconnect the main circuit breaker.	
Shandong, Tengzhou	10 January 2003	1227	Fuxin	Shanghai	Passenger	1	6	The head of the dining car of the 1227 passenger train mistook a bag of Sodium nitrite for sugar and gave it to Ms. Su, the dining car attendant who sold milk, and told Ms. Su that White sugar could be added when preparing milk. Then Ms. Su sold the milk with Sodium nitrite added to the passengers, causing seven passengers to be Foodborne illness poisoned. One passenger, Mr. Ma, died after rescue.	
Heilongjiang, Shuangcheng	5 August 2003	T184	Harbin	Hankou	Passenger	0	0	Collided with two cows rushing into the railway, killing both.	
Liaoning, Kaiyuan	31 August 2004	1394	Jiamusi	Yantai	Passenger	0	0	Railroad switch is in reverse position.	
Guangdong, Heyuan	20 June 2005	T186	Shenzhen	Shenyang North	Passenger	0	0	T186 passenger train is four days late.	
Liaoning, Shenyang	31 July 2005	K127	Xi'an	Changchun	Passenger	6	30	Collision of a freight train with a passenger train due to a sabotaged signal.	
Liaoning, Jinzhou	17 November 2005	K27	Beijing	Dandong	Passenger	0	0	The oil delivery pipe of the fuel oil boiler of the air-conditioning power car leaks oil.	
Beijing Kowloon Railway, near Dongshui station (东水站)	11 April 2006					2	18	Signal failure leading to collision of two trains (T159 and 1017) causing derailment of last 4 carriages of train 1017	
Outside Red Hill Station (红山渠站)	28 February 2007					3	32	High winds caused derailment for train bound for Urumqi	
Beijing, Daxing	10 December 2007	K215	Beijing	Tumen	Passenger	1	0	Illegal operation in fog: Zhang, a railway worker, was hit by the K215 passenger train from Beijing railway station to Tumen railway station pulled by Dongfeng 4D diesel locomotive when measuring the parameters of the catenary, and died on the spot.	
Changyi	23 January 2008					18	9	Passenger train D59 travelling from Beijing to Qingdao	
Hunan, Guangdong	24 January 2008	T238	Guangzhou East	Harbin	Passenger	0	0	snow disaster in southern China: The train pulled by electric locomotive could not move forward, causing the train to be delayed 73 hours and 28 minutes.	
Hunan, Guangdong	24 January 2008	T124	Guangzhou	Changchun	Passenger	0	0	snow disaster in southern China: the train pulled by electric locomotive could not move forward, causing the train to be delayed Six days and seven nights.	
Zibo	28 April 2008					72	416	Zibo train collision	
Chenzhou	29 June 2009					3	63	Chenzhou train collision	
Liuzhou	29 July 2009					4	34	Derailment of a passenger train	
Tianjin–Shanhaiguan railway	30 September 2009	1230	Fuxin	Shanghai	Passenger	0	0	The crane at the construction site of Tianjin–Qinhuangdao high-speed railway tilted to Tianjin–Shanhaiguan railway.	
Dongxiang County, Jiangxi	23 May 2010					19	71	2010 Jiangxi derailment	
Hohhot	13 August 2010					11	1	A train carrying stones derailed at a construction site.	
Urumqi	24 March 2011					3	85	A train crashed into a bus.	
Wenzhou	23 July 2011					40	210+	Wenzhou train collision	
Baoji	24 March 2012					0	0	A freight train numbered 10520 derailed.	
Hebei, Qinhuangdao	3 August 2012	T121	Guangzhou	Changchun	Passenger	0	0	When the T121 passenger train pulled by the No.3009 locomotive of Dongfeng 4D diesel locomotive in the Beijing Railway Bureau Tianjin locomotive depot ran between the longjiaying railway station and Shanhaiguan of the Tianjin–Shanhaiguan railway, it was attacked by mudflow. Huge mountain torrents washed away the railway revetment and rushed to the line, smashing the fuel tank of the No.3009 locomotive of Dongfeng 4D diesel locomotive, causing oil leakage and locomotive derailment. Fortunately, there were no casualties in the accident. At 5:20, the railway was reopened.	
Ankang	16 August 2013					0	0	On a passenger train numbered T221, the diesel engine of the air-conditioned generator car was damaged, and the oil rushed out of the fuel port and burned in high temperature.	
Jinzhou	17 October 2013					0	0	Two freight trains collided sideways.	
Golmud	23 October 2013					1	51	A passenger train numbered 7581 was hit by a slipping train.	
Loudi	26 March 2014					0	0	A freight train numbered 26326 derailed due to heavy rainfall.	
Hailun	13 April 2014					0	15	A passenger train numbered K7034 was derailed because the rail tracks were manually removed.	
Liaoning, Huludao	12 May 2014	T40	Qiqihar	Beijing	Passenger	0	0	Vandalism.	
Jinchang	4 June 2021		Ürümqi	Hangzhou		9	0	A train crashed into railway workers.	
Jingyuan County	8 March 2022					3	1	A freight train on the Honghui railway derailed after a dump truck struck a bridge.	
Guizhou	4 June 2022	D2809	Guilin North	Guangzhou South	Passenger	1	8	A high-speed train hit a mudslide: the driver was killed.	
Beijing	14 December 2023		Changping Line		Subway	0	515	2023 Beijing Subway collision	
Kunming	27 November 2025					11	2	A train ran into a group of railway workers on a curved section of track at the city's Luoyang Town railway station.	
Deyang	27 November 2025					2	0	Two railway maintenance workers died after being hit by a train	

== See also ==
- List of rail accidents by country
