= Nanyuan =

Nanyuan (Chinese: 南苑) may refer to:

- Beijing Nanyuan Airport, a closed airport in Fengtai District, Beijing
- Weifang Nanyuan Airport, in Weifang, Shandong Province

== Subdistricts ==
- Nanyuan Subdistrict, Beijing, in Fengtai District
- Nanyuan Subdistrict, Guangzhou, in Liwan District
- Nanyuan Subdistrict, Hangzhou, in Yuhang District
- Nanyuan Subdistrict, Jining, in Shizhong District, Jining, Shandong
- Nanyuan Subdistrict, Kaifeng, in Gulou District, Kaifeng, Henan
- Nanyuan Subdistrict, Nanjing, in Jianye District
- Nanyuan Subdistrict, Wusu, Xinjiang
- Nanyuan Subdistrict, Shenzhen

== See also ==
- Nanyuan station (disambiguation)
