= Kunming train crash =

Train crash in China

Details
- Date: 27 November 2025; 4 months ago Approx. 00:35 (UTC+8; China Standard Time)
- Location: Curved section within Luoyangzhen station
- Country: China
- Line: Connecting line between Kunming Station and Kunming South Station
- Operator: China Railway Kunming Group (Kunming South Public Works Segment)
- Service: Test train 55537 (Seismic equipment testing train, reportedly CR300AF No. 0001)
- Incident type: Train collision with railway construction workers
- Cause: Initial reports indicate that the construction party (Kunming South Public Works Segment) workers entered the track early without receiving construction dispatch orders during planned rail replacement work

Statistics
- Trains: 1
- Deaths: 11
- Injured: 2

At approximately 00:35 CST on 27 November 2025, a railway accident occurred at Luoyangzhen station in Kunming, Yunnan, China. A test train used for earthquake equipment inspection, while operating within the station, collided with construction workers working on the line, resulting in 11 deaths and 2 injuries. The accident was the deadliest train crash in China since 2011 Wenzhou train collision.

== Background ==
Luoyangzhen station (simplified Chinese: 洛羊镇站; traditional Chinese: 洛羊鎮站) is located in Luoyang Subdistrict, Chenggong District, Kunming, Yunnan Province, and affiliated with the China Railway Kunming Group (CR Kunming). The station is an intermediate station on the connecting line between Kunming Station and Kunming South Station, connecting the Shanghai–Kunming High-Speed Railway (HSR), the Yunnan–Guangxi Railway, and the China-Laos railway corridors; it is known as the "Key to the Kunming Railway Hub".

The station opened in December 2018. Since 2023, it has provided full-train high-speed railway express freight services, responsible for transporting time-sensitive goods such as fresh flowers and daily merchandise. Prior to the accident, CR Kunming had issued multiple construction safety requirements, specifically highlighting safety risks regarding bridge work, night-time walking, and accessing high ballast beds, emphasising that personnel must strictly observe "zero tolerance" discipline and maintain the safety baseline.

== Crash ==
The accident occurred in the early hours of 27 November 2025 at a curved section within Luoyangzhen station.

The train involved was test train number 55537, mainly used for inspecting seismic monitoring equipment along the railway line. The train may have been a CR300AF-001 EMU test train, passing through Luoyangzhen station at approximately 114 km/h around 00:35 that day. When the train reached the curve within the station, it collided with construction workers who had already entered the track to work.

== Casualties and rescue ==
The crash killed 11 construction workers and injured 2 others.

Following the accident, railway authorities immediately activated emergency protocols and launched rescue and medical treatment efforts in conjunction with the local government. The injured were sent to the First Affiliated Hospital of Kunming Medical University (Chenggong Hospital) for treatment; one worker was seriously injured and admitted to the intensive care unit for thoracic surgery. Another 38-year-old male victim suffered thoracic vertebrae and maxillofacial fractures; his condition is relatively stable, and he was subsequently transferred to the plastic surgery department for treatment.

Railway authorities expressed deep condolences to the victims and extended sympathies to the families of the deceased and injured.

== Preliminary investigation ==
According to a preliminary assessment, the accident was caused by construction personnel entering the track early.

At the time of the incident, the Kunming South Public Works Segment (subordinate to China Railway Kunming Group) had originally planned to conduct rail replacement work on the up and down main lines and switch areas at both ends of Luoyangzhen station between 00:50 and 04:00 that day. However, before receiving the formal construction order from the railway dispatch department, workers entered the line prematurely and collided with the test train passing through the section normally.

== Aftermath ==
After the crash, railway authorities stated that transport order at Luoyangzhen station had returned to normal. Medical treatment for the injured and aftermath arrangements are ongoing, and details of the accident await further investigation and clarification. Railway authorities also stated that relevant responsibilities will be pursued in accordance with laws and regulations, and lessons will be learned to strengthen railway transport safety management.

Given that the accident caused more than 10 deaths, it is classified as a major accident under the Regulation on the Emergency Rescue and Investigation and Handling of Railway Traffic Accidents. On 28 November, the Work Safety Committee of the State Council decided to supervise the investigation and handling of the accident.

== See also ==
- Pasir Ris rail accident
- List of rail accidents in China
