= Jining railway station =

Jining railway station may refer to:

- Jining railway station (Inner Mongolia) (集宁站), a railway station in Ulanqab, Inner Mongolia, China.
- Jining railway station (Shandong) (济宁站), a railway station in Jining, Shandong, China.
