= Rencheng, Jining =

Coordinates: 35°24′24″N 116°36′00″E

Rencheng 任城区
- District
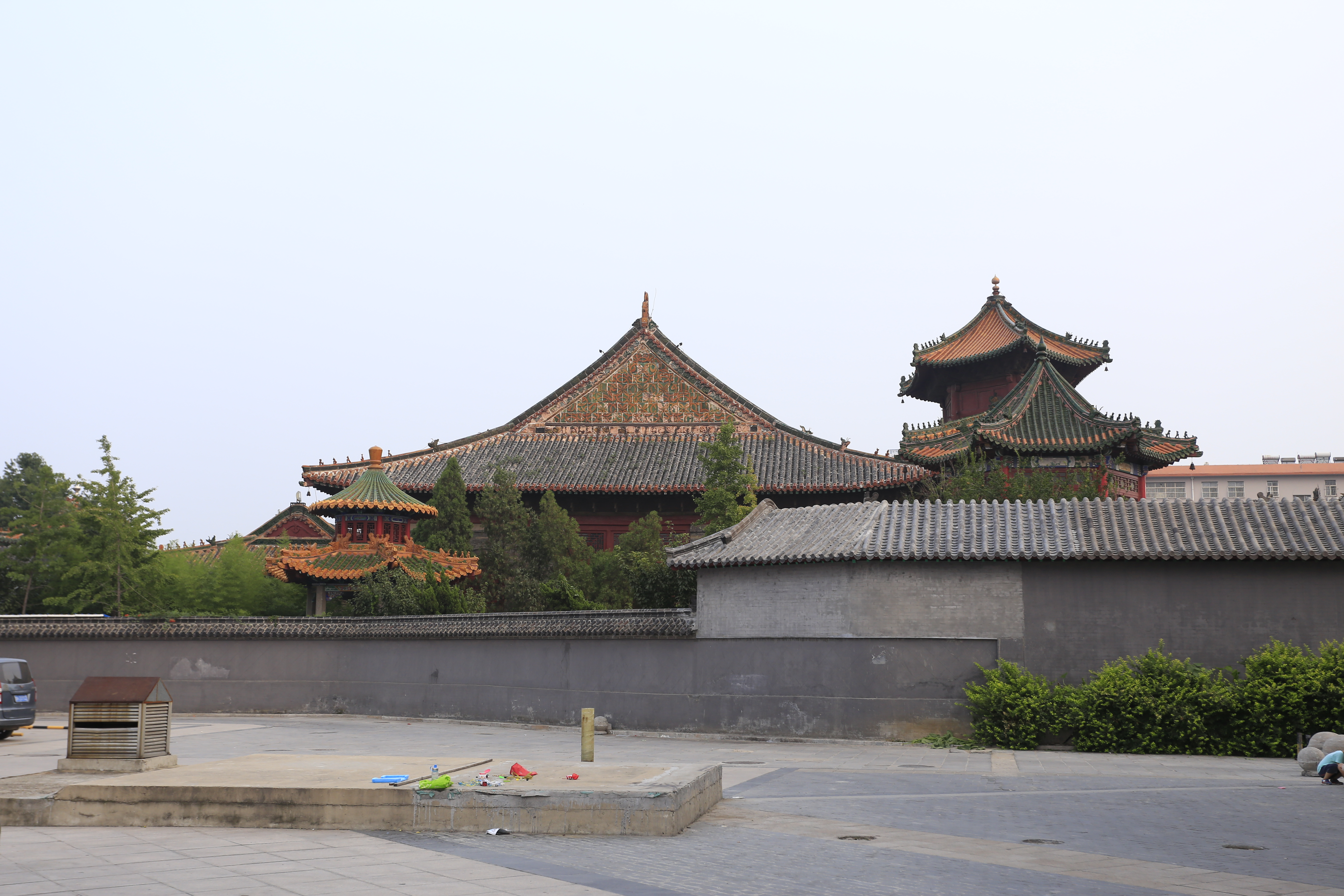
- Jining Great East Temple (济宁东大寺)

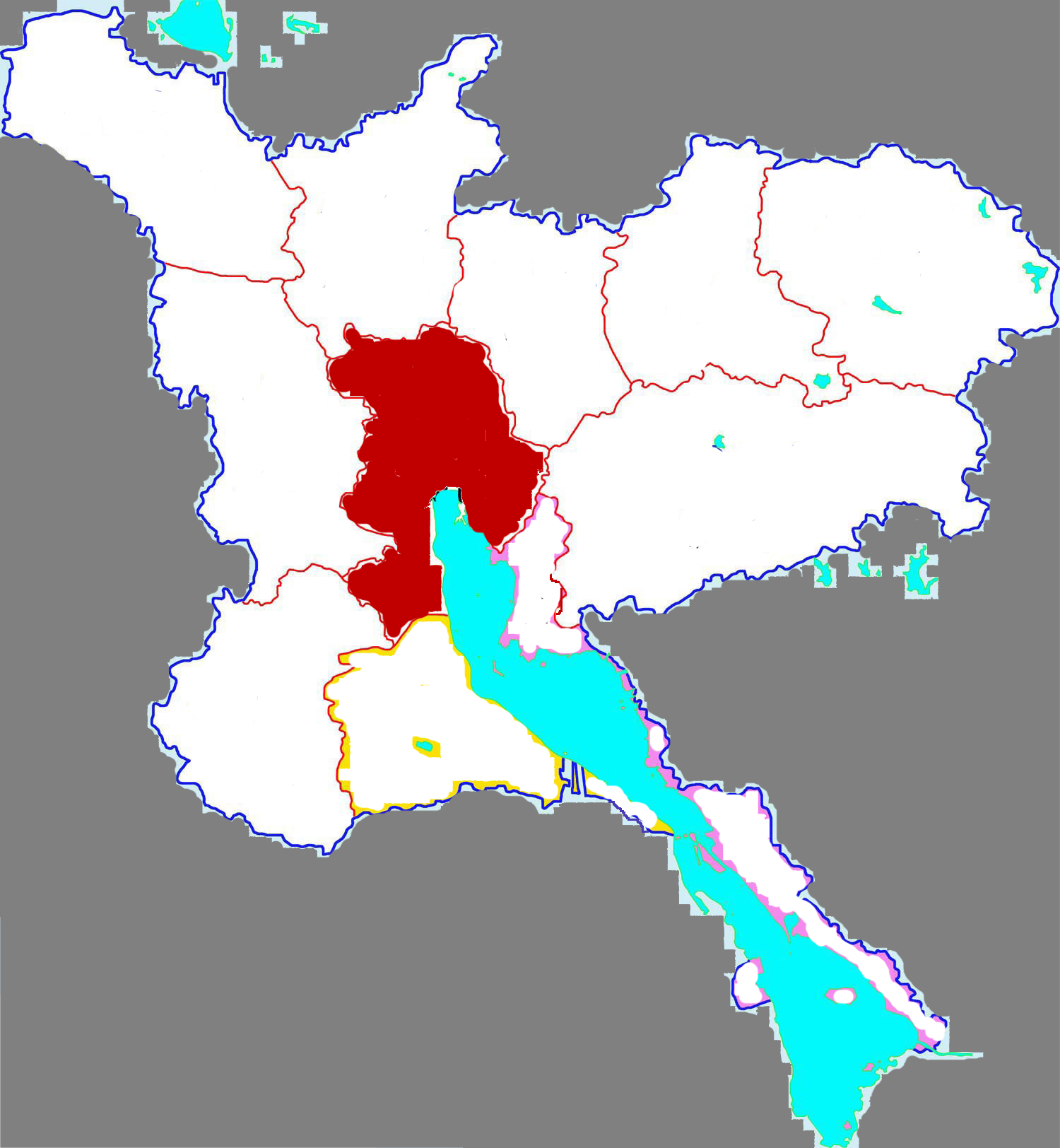
- Location in Jining

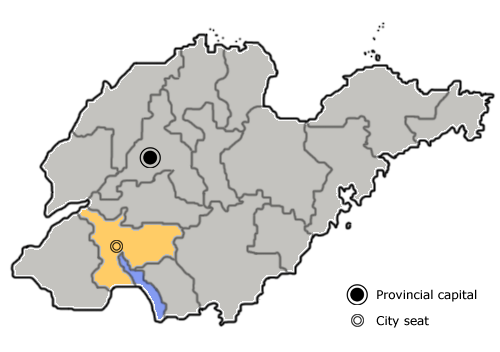
- Jining in Shandong
- Country: People's Republic of China
- Province: Shandong
- Prefecture-level city: Jining

Area
  - Total: 889 km^{2} (343 sq mi)

Population (2019)
  - Total: 1,023,100
  - Density: 1,150/km^{2} (2,980/sq mi)
- Time zone: UTC+8 (China Standard)
- Postal Code: 272000
- Website: www.rencheng.gov.cn

Rencheng (Chinese: 任城; pinyin: Rènchéng) is one of two districts and the seat of the city of Jining in Shandong province, China. In November 2013 Shizhong District was merged into Rencheng.

== History ==
During the Qin Dynasty, the state of Ren was abolished, and Rencheng county and Kangfu county were established, under the Xue Commandery, thus dating the establishment and naming of Rencheng to around 2,000 years ago.

The current Rencheng District was formed in December of 1993 after the former Jining Suburban district (Chinese: 济宁市郊区) was renamed Rencheng District (Chinese: 任城区). In November of 2013 Shizhong District was abolished and merged into Rencheng District forming the current boundaries of the district.

== Administrative divisions ==
As of 2013, this district is divided to 15 subdistricts and 5 townships.

Administrative level	Old Rencheng District	Former Shizhong District
Subdistricts	Xuzhuang Subdistrict (许庄街道)	Guhuai Subdistrict (古槐街道)
Subdistricts	Liuxing Subdistrict (柳行街道)	Jiyang Subdistrict (济阳街道)
Subdistricts	Guanghe Subdistrict (洸河街道)	Fuqiao Subdistrict (阜桥街道)
Subdistricts	Liying Subdistrict (李营街道)	Yuehe Subdistrict (越河街道)
Subdistricts	Nanzhang Subdistrict (南张街道)	Nanfan Subdistrict (南苑街道)
Subdistricts	Jincheng Subdistrict (金城街道)	Guanyinge Subdistrict (观音阁街道)
Subdistricts	Xianying Subdistrict (仙营街道)	Anju Subdistrict (安居街道)
Subdistricts		Tangkou Subdistrict (唐口街道)
Towns	Nianlipu (廿里铺镇)	Yutun (喻屯镇)
Towns	Changgou (长沟镇)	
Towns	Jiezhuang (接庄镇)	
Towns	Shiqiao (石桥镇)	

== Transportation ==
Jining railway station is located here.
