= Shizhong =

Shizhong (pinyin) or Shih-chung (Wade-Giles) is may refer to:

== Places ==
- Shizhong District, Chongqing, now defunct
- Shizhong District, Guangyuan, Sichuan
- Shizhong District, Leshan, Sichuan
- Shizhong District, Neijiang, Sichuan
- Shizhong District, Jinan, Shandong
- Shizhong District, Jining, Shandong, now defunct
- Shizhong District, Zaozhuang, Shandong
- Shizhong, Longyan (适中镇), town in Xinluo District, Longyan, Fujian

== People ==
- Shizhong (侍中), an official position in ancient China.
