= Shuangyashan West railway station =

Railway station in Shuangyashan, Heilongjiang

Shuangyashan West 双鸭山西
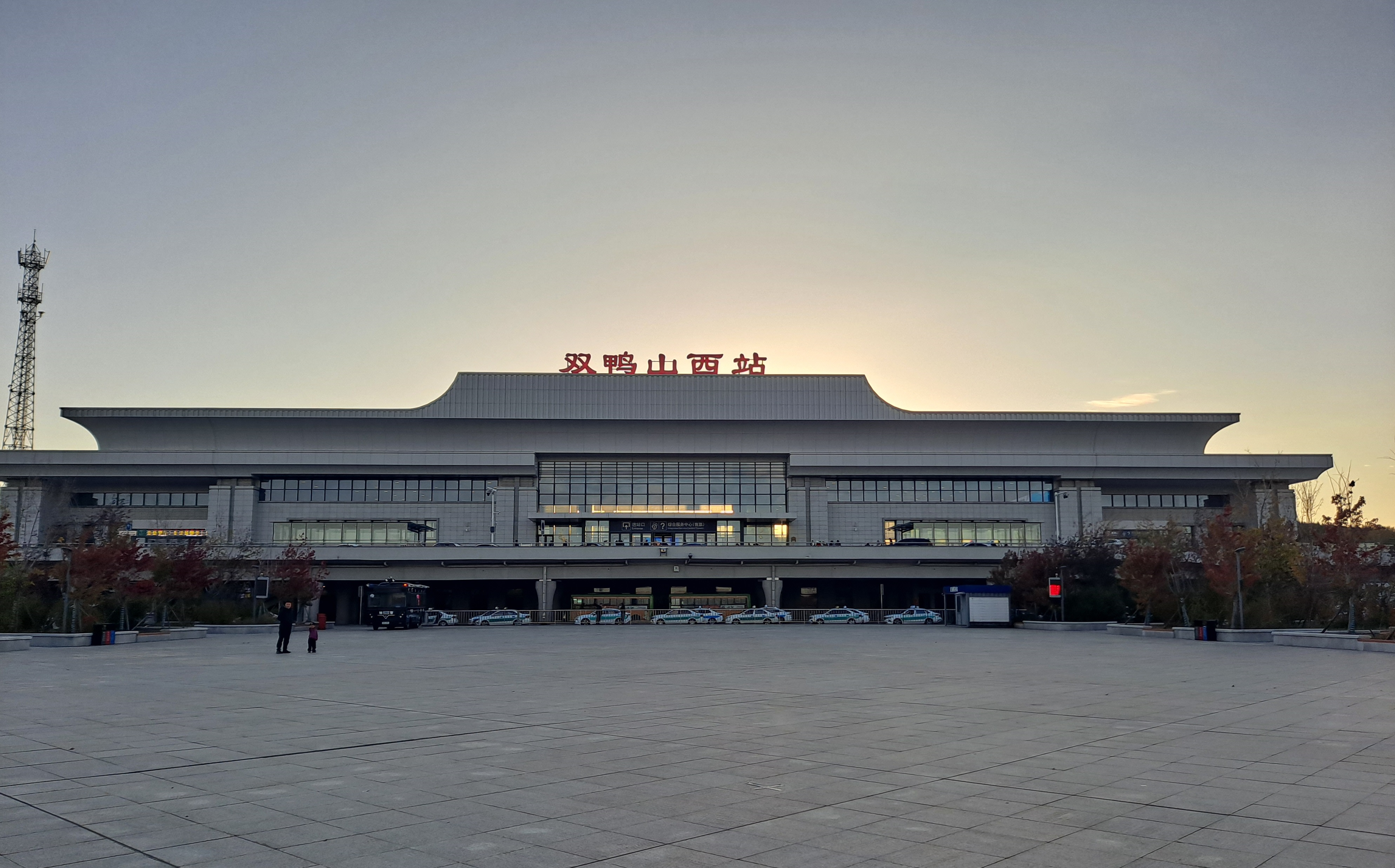

General information
- Location: Jixian County, Shuangyashan, Heilongjiang; China
- Coordinates: 46.70865°N 131.08226°E
- Line: Mudanjiang–Jiamusi high-speed railway

Other information
- Station code: 61203 (TMIS)

History
- Opened: 6 December 2021
Location

Shuangyashan West railway station (Chinese: 双鸭山西站) is a railway station in Jixian County, Shuangyashan, Heilongjiang, China. It opened on 6 December 2021 with the Mudanjiang–Jiamusi high-speed railway. It is the easternmost high-speed railway station in China.

Preceding station	China Railway High-speed	Following station
Huanan East towards Mudanjiang	Mudanjiang–Jiamusi high-speed railway	Jiamusi Terminus
