= Mudanjiang–Jiamusi high-speed railway =

High speed rail line in China

Overview
- Native name: 牡佳高铁
- Status: Operational
- Termini: Mudanjiang; Jiamusi
- Stations: 7

Service
- Operator(s): China Railway High-speed

History
- Opened: December 6, 2021

Technical
- Line length: 371.6 km (231 mi)
- Track gauge: 1,435 mm (4 ft 8 1/2 in)
- Operating speed: 250 km/h (155 mph)

The Mudanjiang–Jiamusi high-speed railway, or Mudanjiang–Jiamusi section of Shenyang–Jiamusi high-speed railway, is a high-speed railway line in China. It is 371.6 kilometres (230.9 mi) long and have a maximum speed of 250 kilometres per hour (160 mph). It was opened on December 6, 2021.

== History ==
Construction on the railway began in November 2016.

== Stations ==
The line will have seven stations:

- Mudanjiang
- Linkou South
- Jixi West
- Qitaihe West
- Huanan East
- Shuangyashan West
- Jiamusi
