= Jizhou North railway station =

Railway station in Jizhou, Tianjin, China

Jizhou North 蓟州北
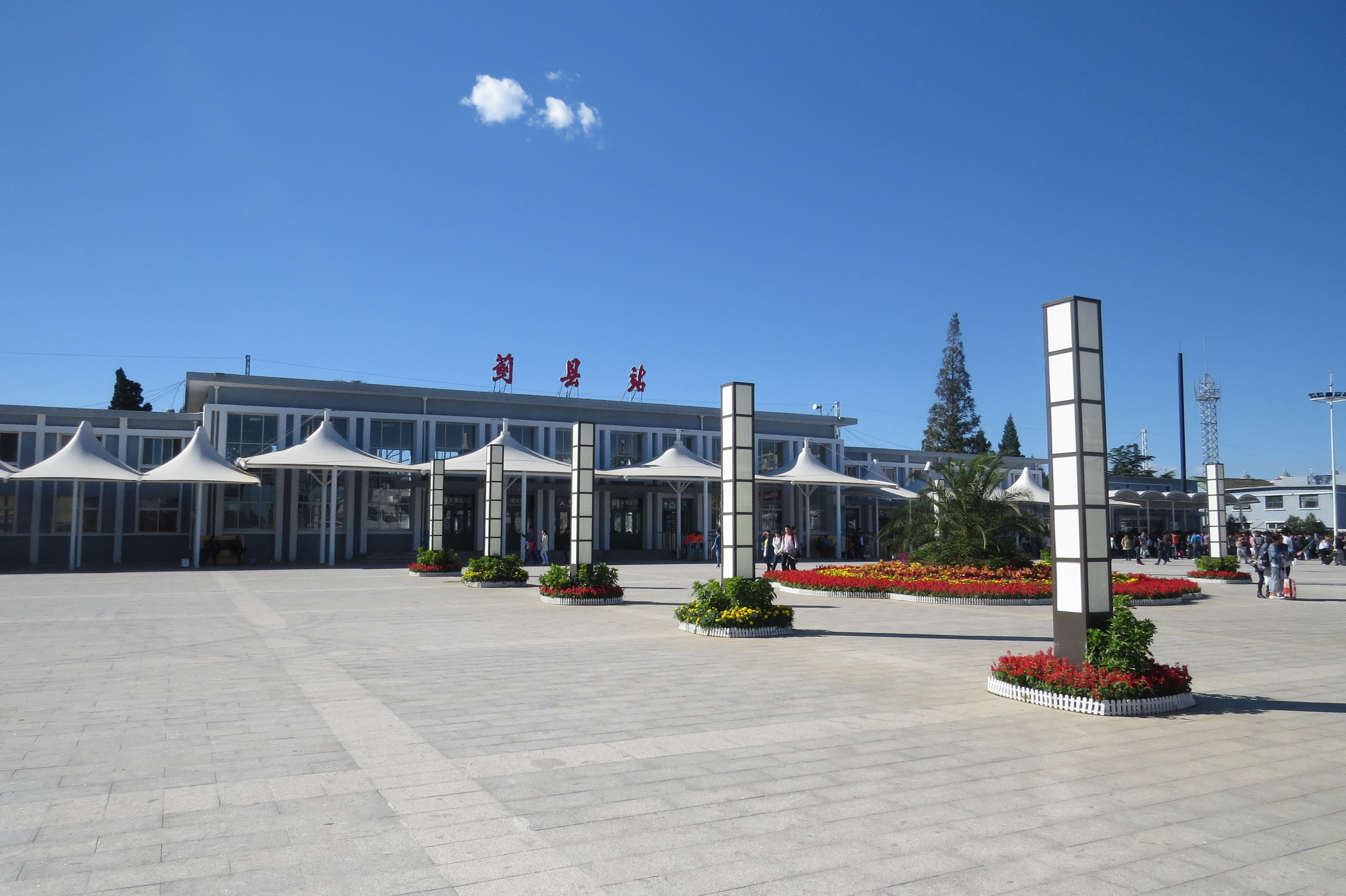

General information
- Location: Jizhou District, Tianjin; China
- Coordinates: 40.0254°N 117.3914°E
- Lines: Tianjin–Jizhou railway Beijing–Harbin railway (via branch)
Location

Jizhou North railway station (Chinese: 蓟州北站) is a railway station located in Jizhou District, Tianjin, China. It is the northern terminus of the Tianjin–Jizhou railway and is also connected to the Beijing–Harbin railway via a branch.

== History ==
From 30 April 2015, the service level was increased from one departure per day to six with the introduction of commuter trains to the Tianjin–Jizhou railway. Two daily departures to Beijing East railway station were introduced on 10 July 2015.

On 1 December 2018, the name of this station was changed from Jizhou to Jizhou North. At the same time, Jizhou South railway station was renamed Jizhou.

Preceding station	China Railway	Following station
Shangcang towards Tianjin	Tianjin–Jizhou railway	Terminus
