= Harbin–Jiamusi intercity railway =

High-speed railway in Heilongjiang Province, China

Overview
- Native name: 哈佳铁路
- Status: Operating
- Locale: Heilongjiang Province, China
- Termini: Harbin; Jiamusi
- Stations: 17

Service
- Services: 1
- Operator(s): China Railway Harbin Group

History
- Opened: September 30, 2018

Technical
- Line length: 343 km (213 mi)
- Track gauge: 1,435 mm (4 ft 8 1/2 in)
- Operating speed: 250 km/h (155 mph)

Harbin–Jiamusi intercity railway is a high-speed railway with in Heilongjiang province of China, connecting the capital Harbin to Jiamusi. It has a total length of 343 km (213 mi) and it is being built as a 200 kilometres per hour (124 mph), double tracked electrified express railway. With an expected journey time of two and a half hours from Harbin to Jiamusi. Total cost of the project is budgeted to be 34.714 billion yuan. The project started construction on June 30, 2014, and opened to traffic by September 30, 2018.

== Overview ==
This railway starts from Harbin, approaches Binxian, Fangzheng, Yilan and finally to the Jiamusi. The line has a length of 343 km (213 mi), of which, 6.2 kilometres (3.9 mi) is renovated existing railway and 336.8 kilometres (209.3 mi) of newly built railway. The stations along the route are Harbin, Zhao'antun, Binxi North, Binxi East, Binzhou, Bin'an, Shenglizhen, Rixingtun, Shuanglonghu, Fangzheng, Demoli, Gaoleng, Dalianhe, Yilan, Hongkeli, Xinghua, Jiamusi West and Jiamusi.
