= Guanyinge Subdistrict, Jining =

Guanyinge Subdistrict 观音阁街道
- Subdistrict
- Location in Shandong Guanyinge (China)
- Coordinates: 35°24′11″N 116°36′11″E
- Country: People's Republic of China
- Province: Shandong
- Prefecture-level city: Jining
- District: Shizhong
- Elevation: 40 m (130 ft)
- Time zone: UTC+8 (China Standard)
- Area code: 0537

Guanyinge Subdistrict (simplified Chinese: 观音阁街道; traditional Chinese: 觀音閣街道; pinyin: Guānyīngé Jiēdào; lit. 'Guanyin Temple') is a subdistrict in Shizhong District, Jining, Shandong province, China. As of 2011, it has 12 residential communities (社区) and two villages under its administration.

== See also ==
- List of township-level divisions of Shandong
