= Transport in Tianjin =

Overview of transport in a Chinese city

Transport in Tianjin consists of an extensive network of roads and railways and a major airport. Bicycle is a major means of transport in daily use of the city.

== Rail ==
There are several railway stations in the city, Tianjin railway station being the principal one. It was built in 1888, initially, the station was located at Wangdaozhuang (旺道莊). The station was later moved to Laolongtou (老龍頭) on the banks of the Hai He River in 1892, so the station was renamed Laolongtou Railway Station. The station was rebuilt from scratch in 1988. The rebuilding work began on April 15, 1987 and was finished on October 1, 1988. The Tianjin Railway Station is also locally called the 'East Station', due to its geographical position.

Tianjin West railway station, Tianjin North railway station and Tianjin South railway station are also major railway stations in Tianjin. There is also Tanggu railway station is located in the important port area of Tanggu District, and TEDA railway station located in TEDA, to the north of Tanggu. There are several other railway stations in the city.

Tianjin metro is an extensive subway system, the second subway system in mainland China, after Beijing. It currently operates 11 lines with an additional 5 lines under construction. Metro line 4-starting from Xiaojie Station in Beichen District in the north and ending at Xizhan Station in Hongqiao District in the south-began operation on July 8, 2025.

Construction on a Beijing-Tianjin high-speed rail began on July 4, 2005, and was scheduled to be completed in 2007.

The following rail lines go through Tianjin:

- Jinghu Railway, from Beijing to Shanghai
- Jingha Railway, from Beijing to Harbin
- Jingqin Railway, from Beijing to Qinhuangdao, Hebei
- Jinpu Railway, from Tianjin to Pukou District, Nanjing
- Jinji Railway, from Tianjin urban area to Ji County, Tianjin
- Jinba Railway, from Tianjin to Bazhou, Hebei

== Roads and expressways ==
Some spots in Tianjin, including roads and bridges, have names from Dr. Sun Yat-Sen's Three Principles of the People (for example, Minquan Gate on Zhonghuan Road). Names harkening back to the era of the Republic of China on the mainland also appear (e.g. Beiyang Road). Many roads in Tianjin are named after a Chinese province or city. Also, Tianjin is unlike Beijing, in that very few roads run parallel to the major four compass directions.

Tianjin has three ring roads. Unlike Beijing, the Inner and Middle Ring Roads are not closed, traffic-controlled roadways and some often have traffic light intersections. The Outer Ring Road is the closest thing to a highway-level ring road, although traffic is often chaotic and sometimes more than chaotic.

- Inner Ring Road (neihuan)
- Middle Ring Road (zhonghuan)
- Outer Ring Road (waihuan)

Tianjin's roads often finish in dao (道 avenue), xian (S: 线 / T: 線 line, more used for highways and through routes) and lu (路 road). Jie (街 street) is rare. As Tianjin's roads are rarely in a cardinal compass direction, jing (S: 经 / T: 經) roads and wei (S: 纬 / T: 緯) roads often appear, which attempt to run more directly north-south and east-west, respectively.

The following seven expressways of China run in or through Tianjin:

- Jingjintang Expressway, from Beijing, through Tianjin's urban area, to Tanggu District / TEDA
- Jinghu Expressway, from Jinjing Gonglu Bridge to Shanghai (together with Jingjintang Expressway, this is the expressway from Beijing to Shanghai)
- Jingshen Expressway, through Baodi District on its way from Beijing to Shenyang
- Tangjin Expressway, from Tanggu District, Tianjin, to Tangshan, Hebei -- known in Tianjin as the Jintang Expressway
- Baojin Expressway, from Beichen District, Tianjin, to Baoding, Hebei -- known in Tianjin as the Jinbao Expressway
- Jinbin Expressway, from Zhangguizhuang Bridge to Hujiayuan Bridge, both within Tianjin
- Jinji Expressway, from central Tianjin to Jixian County

The following six China National Highways pass through Tianjin:

- China National Highway 102, through Ji County, Tianjin on its way from Beijing to Harbin
- China National Highway 103, from Beijing, through Tianjin's urban area, to Tanggu District
- China National Highway 104, from Beijing, through Tianjin Municipality, to Fuzhou
- China National Highway 105, from Beijing, through Tianjin Municipality, to Macau
- China National Highway 112, circular highway around Beijing, passes through Tianjin Municipality
- China National Highway 205, from Shanhaiguan, Hebei, through Tianjin Municipality, to Guangzhou

== Air ==
Tianjin Binhai International Airport (ZBTJ) is located to the east of the urban area, in Dongli District, Tianjin.

== Public transport ==
Trams in Tianjin network was built by Belgian interests. The concession was given by the occupying powers in 1901 and recognized by the Chinese authorities in 1904. Tram services began in 1906. Tianjin was the first city to have its own citywide tram system in China. Buses were introduced by the municipality in 1932. Tramways were withdrawn around 1972. Trams returned in Tianjin as TEDA Modern Guided Rail Tram. There were 402 bus lines in the city as of 2004.

The Tianjin Metro is currently operational, consisting of 13 subway lines and 1 tram system (closed). The initial line started construction on July 4, 1970 and commenced service in 1984. However, this line, with its outdated trains and services, was forced to close down in 2001, and renovation commenced until 2006, when the line (now known as Line 1 on the system) reopened. The other line, Line 9, started construction in 2001 and opened in 2004, with recent extensions in 2011. The Tram line, TEDA Modern Guided Rail Tram, commenced operations in 2007 and ran until June 2023 between downtown Tianjin and TEDA (Tianjin Economic Development Area) in the coastal region. Other lines are under construction and will be successively opened.

== See also ==
- TEDA Modern Guided Rail Tram
