= Jiamusi railway station =

Railway station in Heilongjiang Province, China

Jiamusi 佳木斯
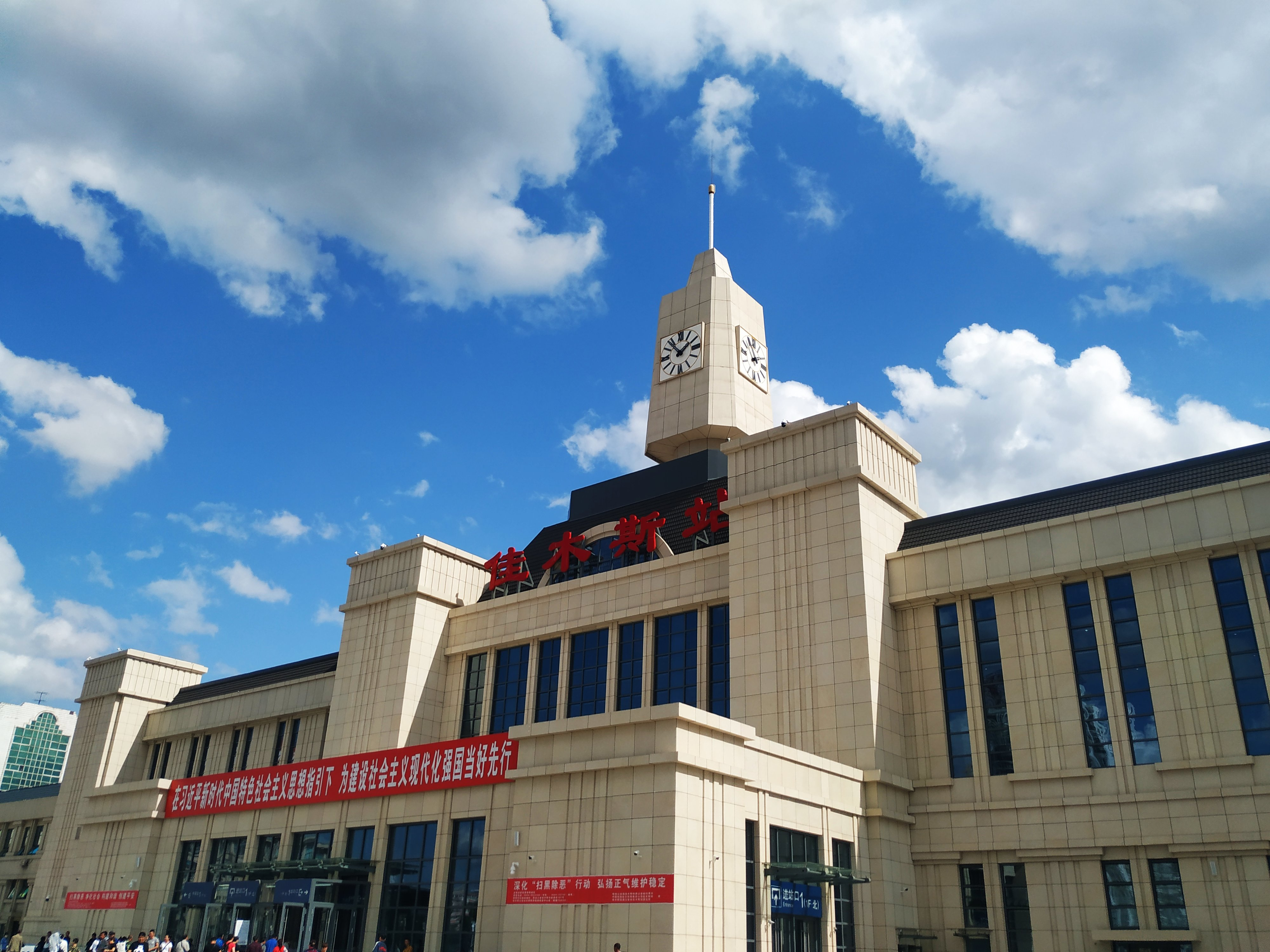
- Jiamusi railway station
- 佳木斯火车站

General information
- Location: Zhanqian Road, Qianjin District, Jiamusi, Heilongjiang; China
- Coordinates: 46°48′7″N 130°22′31″E
- Operated by: Harbin Railway Bureau, China Railway Corporation
- Line(s): Suijia Railway; Mujia Railway; Harbin–Jiamusi intercity railway; Tujia Railway; Jiafu Railway; Mudanjiang–Jiamusi high-speed railway
- Platforms: 5
- Tracks: 12

Other information
- Station code: TMIS code: 60452; Telegraph code: JMB
- Classification: Top Class station

History
- Opened: 1937

Jiamusi railway station (Chinese: 佳木斯站; pinyin: Jiāmùsī Zhàn) is a major passenger railway station serving Jiamusi, Heilongjiang. Jiamusi railway station is also an important railway hub that links other cities in East Heilongjiang.

On opening of the Harbin–Jiamusi intercity railway, it was the easternmost high-speed railway station in China. This title has now been lost to Shuangyashan West railway station.

== History ==
=== Japanese Occupation ===
The construction of Jiamusi station started in 1935, right after the Manchukuo administration drafted the plan for the city. Two years later, Jiamusi railway station was opened to public on July 1, 1937. It's claimed by historians that Jiamusi railway station was not intended to serve passenger traffic, as the station was heavily policed and all passengers in the station were thoroughly searched. Instead, Jiamusi railway station served as a freight hub for the Japanese to transport wood, ore and crops out of the region.

Preceding station	China Railway High-speed	Following station
Jiamusi West towards Harbin	Harbin–Jiamusi intercity railway	Terminus
Shuangyashan West towards Mudanjiang	Mudanjiang–Jiamusi high-speed railway	Terminus
