= Cangzhou railway station =

Railway station in Cangzhou, China

Coordinates: 38°18′33″N 116°52′40″E

Cangzhou 沧州
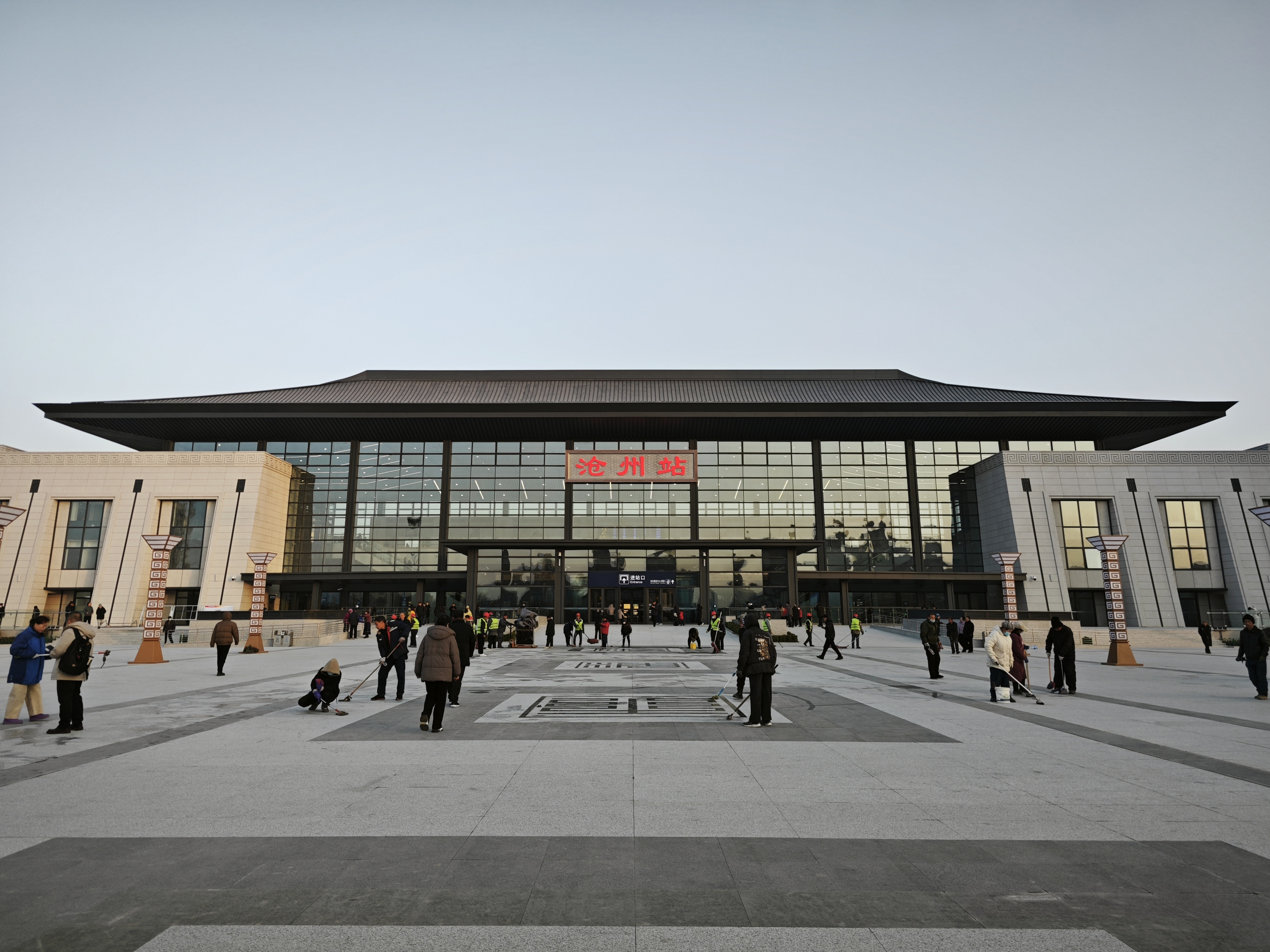

General information
- Location: Xinhua, Cangzhou, Hebei; China
- Line: Beijing–Shanghai Railway

Other information
- Station code: 16058

Services
Preceding station	China Railway	Following station
Tianjin West towards Beijing	Beijing–Shanghai railway	Dezhou towards Shanghai
Location
- Location within Hebei

Cangzhou station (simplified Chinese: 沧州站; traditional Chinese: 滄州站; pinyin: Cāngzhōu Zhàn) is a station on the conventional Beijing–Shanghai railway in the city of Cangzhou, Hebei.
