= Jining railway station (Shandong) =

Railway station in Shandong, China

Jining 济宁
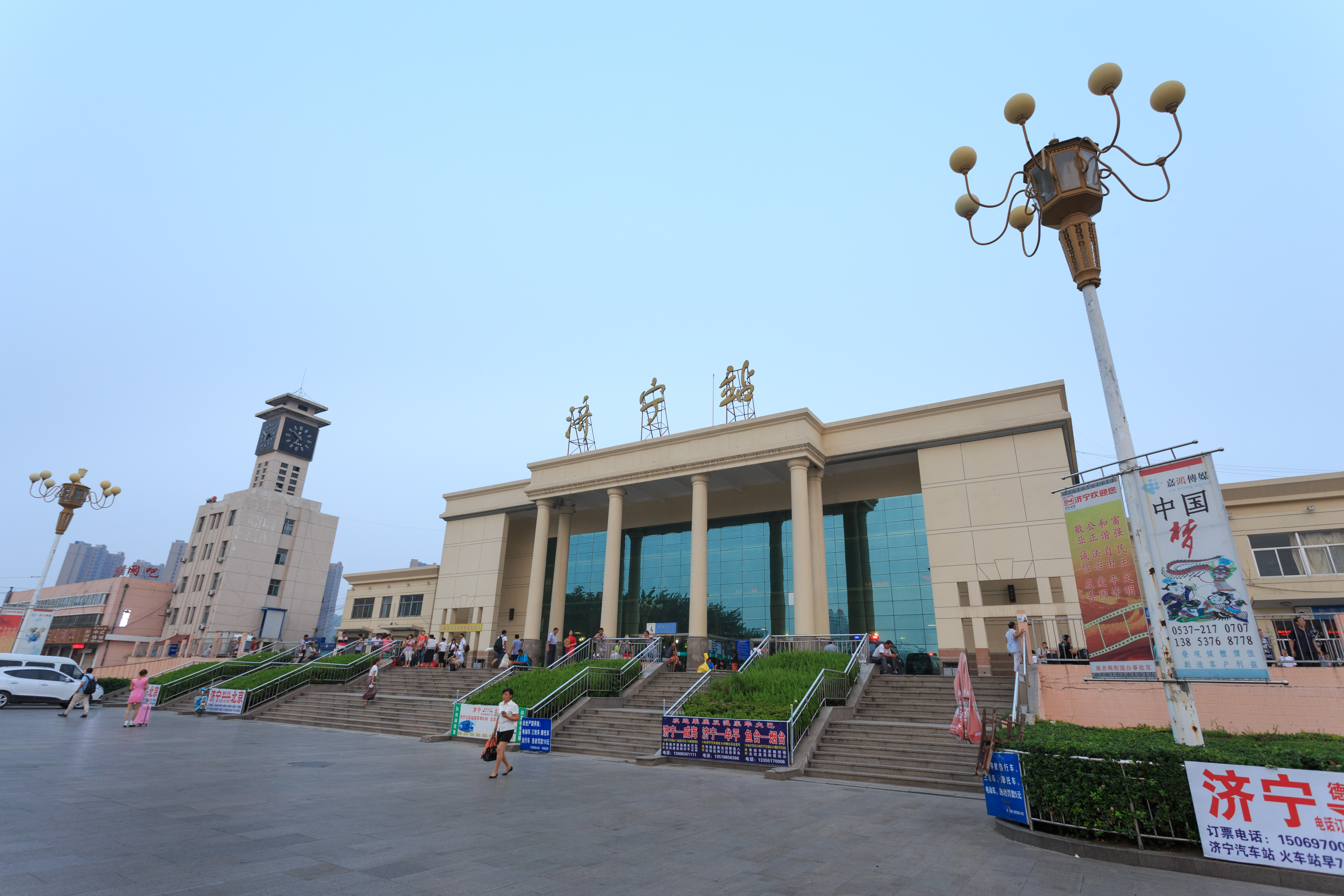
- The front of the station in 2015

General information
- Location: Rencheng District, Jining, Shandong; China
- Coordinates: 35°23′35″N 116°35′42″E
- Operated by: China Railway
- Line(s): Xinxiang–Yanzhou railway

Jining railway station (Chinese: 济宁站) is a railway station on the Xinxiang–Yanzhou railway in Rencheng District, Jining, Shandong, China. It opened in 1912 and is a third-class station.

Preceding station	China Railway	Following station
Jiaxiang towards Xinxiang	Xinxiang–Yanzhou railway	Yanzhou Terminus
