= Tianjin–Shanhaiguan railway =

Railway line in China

Beijing–Harbin railway 京哈铁路
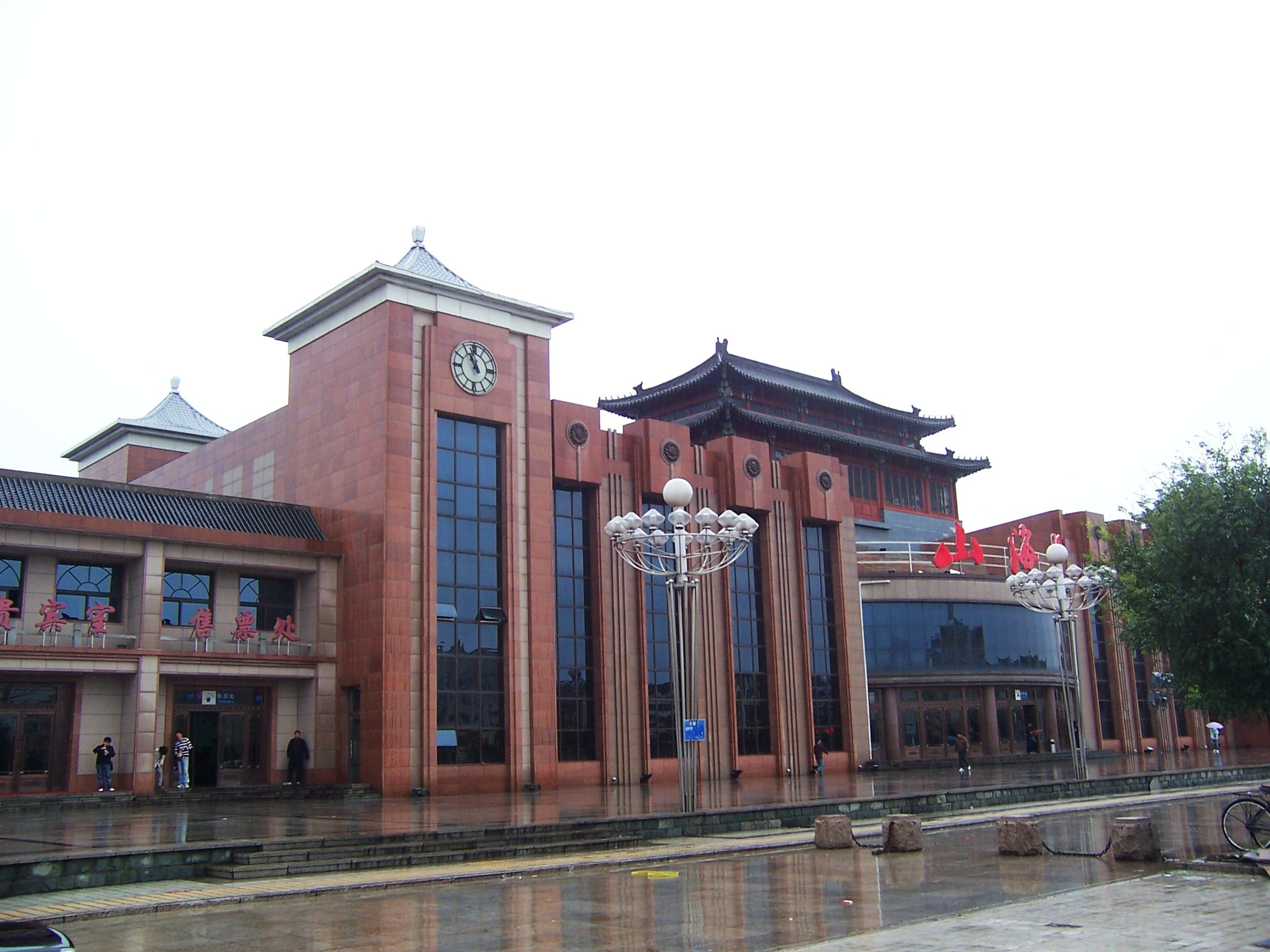
- Shanhaiguan Railway Station in September 2010

Service
- Operator(s): China Railway Beijing Group

Technical
- Line length: 303 km (188 mi)
- Track gauge: 1,435 mm (4 ft 8 1/2 in) standard gauge
- Electrification: 25 kV 50 Hz AC overhead catenary
- Operating speed: 250 km/h (160 mph)
- Signalling: Automatic block signaling

The Tianjin–Shanhaiguan railway or Jinshan railway is a railway line in China between Tianjin and Shanhaiguan. The line is 303 km long and starts serves Tianjin, Tanggu, Tangshan, Qinhuangdao and Shanhaiguan railway stations. The railway was originally part of the Beijing–Harbin railway but was renamed when the Beijing–Harbin railway was merged with the Beijing–Qinhuangdao railway.

== See also ==
- Rail transport in China
- List of railways in China
