= Shizhong, Jining =

District of Jining, Shandong, China

Coordinates: 35°24′29″N 116°35′47″E

Shizhong District 市中区
- County of China
- 1983–2013
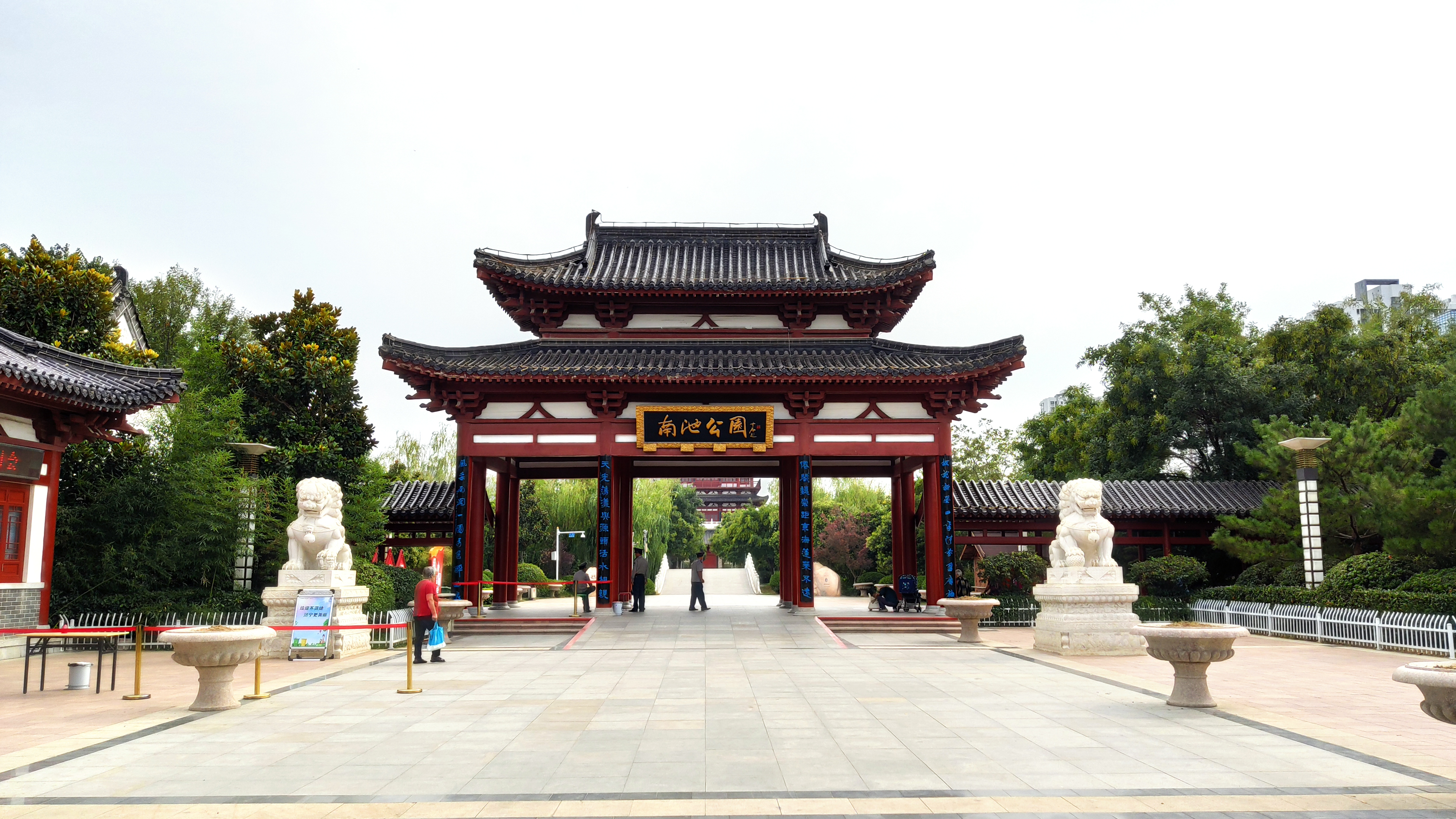
- Nanchi Park

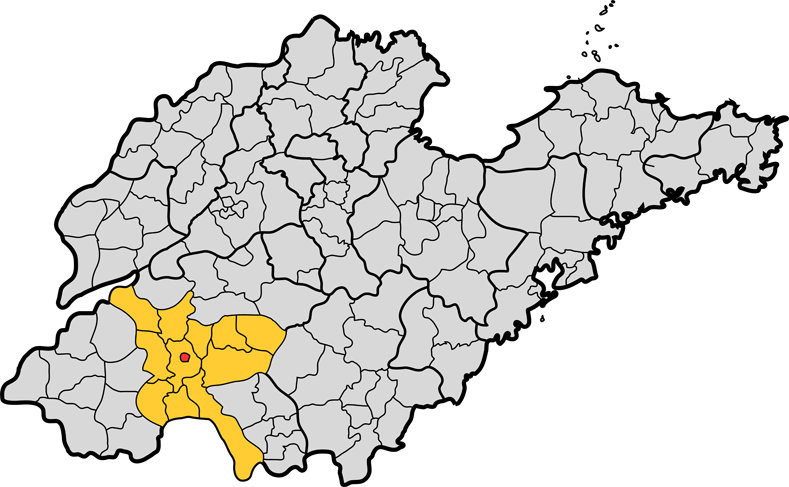
- Location in Jining
- History
  - Established: 1983
  - Disestablished: 2013
- Today part of: Rencheng

Shizhong District (Chinese: 市中区) is a former district of the city of Jining in Shandong province, China. In November 2013 it was merged into Rencheng District.
