= Tianjin railway station =

Principal railway station in Tianjin, China

Tianjin 天津
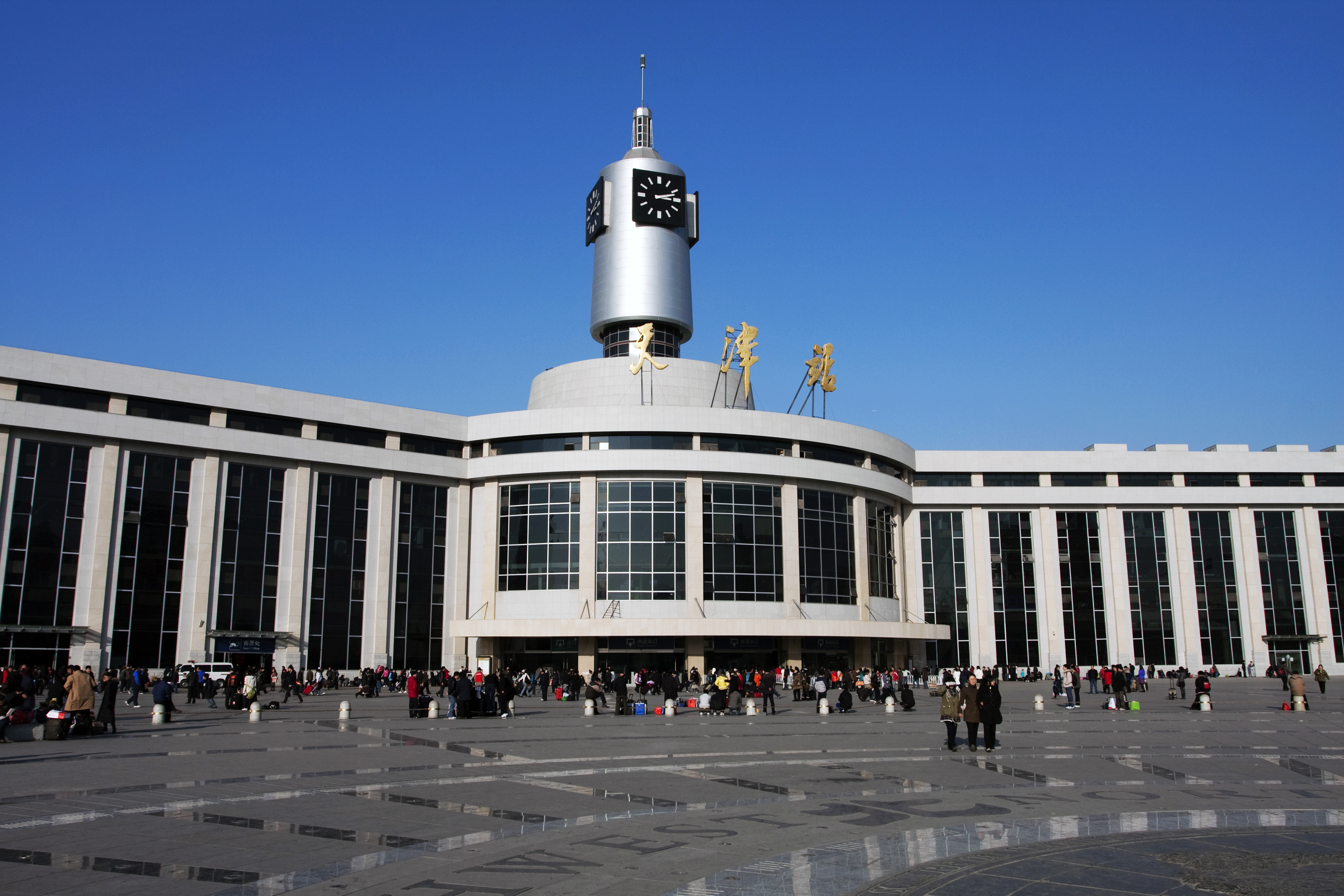
- Tianjin Station, south entrance

General information
- Location: East Haihe Road; Hedong District and Hebei District, Tianjin; China
- Coordinates: 39°8′5″N 117°12′11″E
- Operator: CR Beijing
- Lines: China Railway: Beijing–Shanghai railway; Tianjin–Shanhaiguan railway; China Railway High-Speed: Beijing–Tianjin intercity railway; Tianjin–Qinhuangdao high-speed railway
- Platforms: 18 (8 island platforms and 2 side platforms)
- Tracks: 18
- Connections: Tianjinzhan station Binhai Mass Transit; Bus terminal

Other information
- Station code: 10157 (TMIS code); TJP (telegraph code); TJI (Pinyin code)
- Classification: Top Class station (特等站)

History
- Opened: 1888
- Former names: Laolongtou (Chinese: 老龙头)

Key dates
- 1988: Rebuilt
- 2008: Expanded and renovated

Services
Preceding station	China Railway High-speed	Following station
Wuqing towards Beijing South	Beijing–Tianjin intercity railway	Terminus
Tianjin West Terminus	Tianjin–Qinhuangdao high-speed railway Part of the Tianjin–Shenyang High-Speed Railway	Junliangcheng North towards Qinhuangdao
Preceding station	China Railway	Following station
Guangyang towards Beijing	Beijing–Shanghai railway	Cangzhou towards Shanghai
Location

Tianjin railway station (Chinese: 天津站; pinyin: Tiānjīn Zhàn), also translated as Tianjin station, is the principal railway station in Tianjin, China. It was established in 1888, rebuilt in 1987–1988, and restructured in 2007–2008. Its Chinese big title was written by Deng Xiaoping in 1988, for celebrating the 100th anniversary of its founding.

Since 1 August 2008, it serves as the terminus for high-speed trains to the city, including the Beijing–Tianjin intercity railway, which can reach speeds above 350 km/h.

== Historical development ==
=== Qing Dynasty period ===
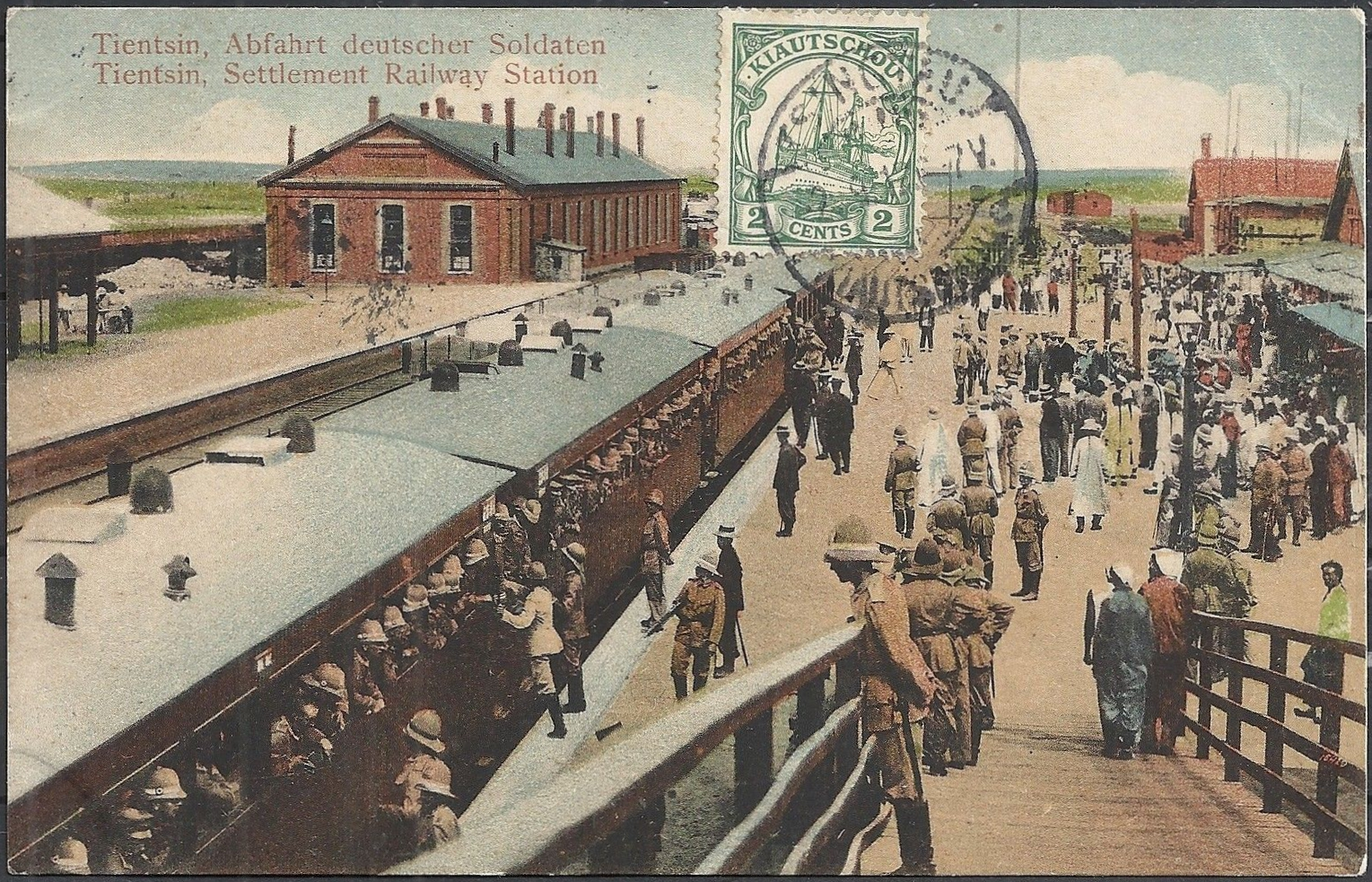
A postcard during the Boxer Rebellion period showing German troops departing the "Old Dragon Head" railway station (老龍頭車站), the former name of the Nanjing Station.

In 1888, the Kaiping Tramway and Imperial Railways of North China was extended to Tianjin and was subsequently renamed as the Jintang Railway (津唐铁路), becoming the first train station completed in China at the time. Construction of the railroad had begun in 1886 and was situated near the Hai River. In May 1891, a larger station was built 500 metres (1,640 ft 5 in) to the west and a civil structure contained a three-storey building.

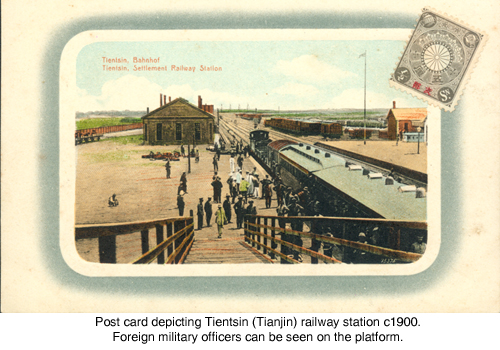
A postcard in 1900 showing the Tianjin Station

During the Boxer Rebellion in June 1900, the Eight-Nation Alliance besieged Tianjin and battled the Boxers in the black bamboo forest outside the British and French Concession. During the ten days of fighting, the "Old Dragon Head" railway station and other station buildings were also destroyed. By July 1900, the armies of the Eight-Nation Alliance occupied Tianjin and the east coast of the rail station became the occupied zone of the Russian army. By December that same year, the Russian Concession was opened and the rail station was now located within the boundaries of the concession. This was strongly opposed by the British and in the end, through the intermediation of Germany, the Russians eventually gave in.

=== Republic of China period ===
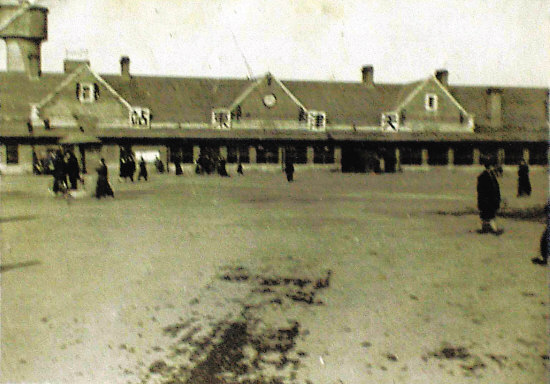
The main station building, waiting room and station square of the Tianjin East Station (Today's Tianjin Station) as of January 1948.

After the Jinghu railway and Tianjin West Station was constructed in 1911, the old Tianjin Station was renamed the Tianjin East Station, and the Tianjin Railway was categorised into the North, East and West Stations. The Tianjin East Station later became the Jingha railway and intersected the Jinpu railway line. On 10 October 1930, The Tianjin East Station was listed among the international train stations at the time. During the period from 1916 to 1946 the Tianjin East Station was approved by the Republic of China Ministry of Railways as a first-class station, and the principal station was upgraded in 1927.

=== People's Republic of China period ===
After the establishment of the People's Republic of China throughout the country in 1949, the Tianjin East Station was renamed the Tianjin Station and since then, successive inspections by the Ministry of Railways have classified it as a top grade station. In 1950, the Tianjin Station waiting rooms were expanded by more than 1,000 square meters (10,764 sq ft), and for thirty years there were no further large-scale expansion works undertaken.

After the reform and opening up, the burden of transportation on the Tianjin Station increasied due to the sharp increase in passenger traffic; the average daily number of passengers was 65,000. After receiving from the State Council and the Ministry of Railways, the Tianjin Municipal Government decided to expand the "Tianjin Railway Improvement Project" and this item was also included among the key projects in the national "Seventh Five-Year Plan". Starting on 15 April 1987, thorough renovation work was conducted on Tianjin Railway Station. New roofing was constructed on the original site of the old station house and also on the 66-metre-high (216 ft 6 in) cylindrical clock tower, face Hai River. The construction work was completed on 25 September 1988. On the eve 1 October of that same year, which was the centenary of the establishment of the Tianjin Station, the then Minister of Railways Li Senmao (李茂森) cut the ribbon and officially opened the new station building of the Tianjin Station. The new renovations had increased the Tianijn Station's daily receiving passenger capacity from 46 pairs to 95 pairs and was one of the most advanced modern railway stations in China at the time.

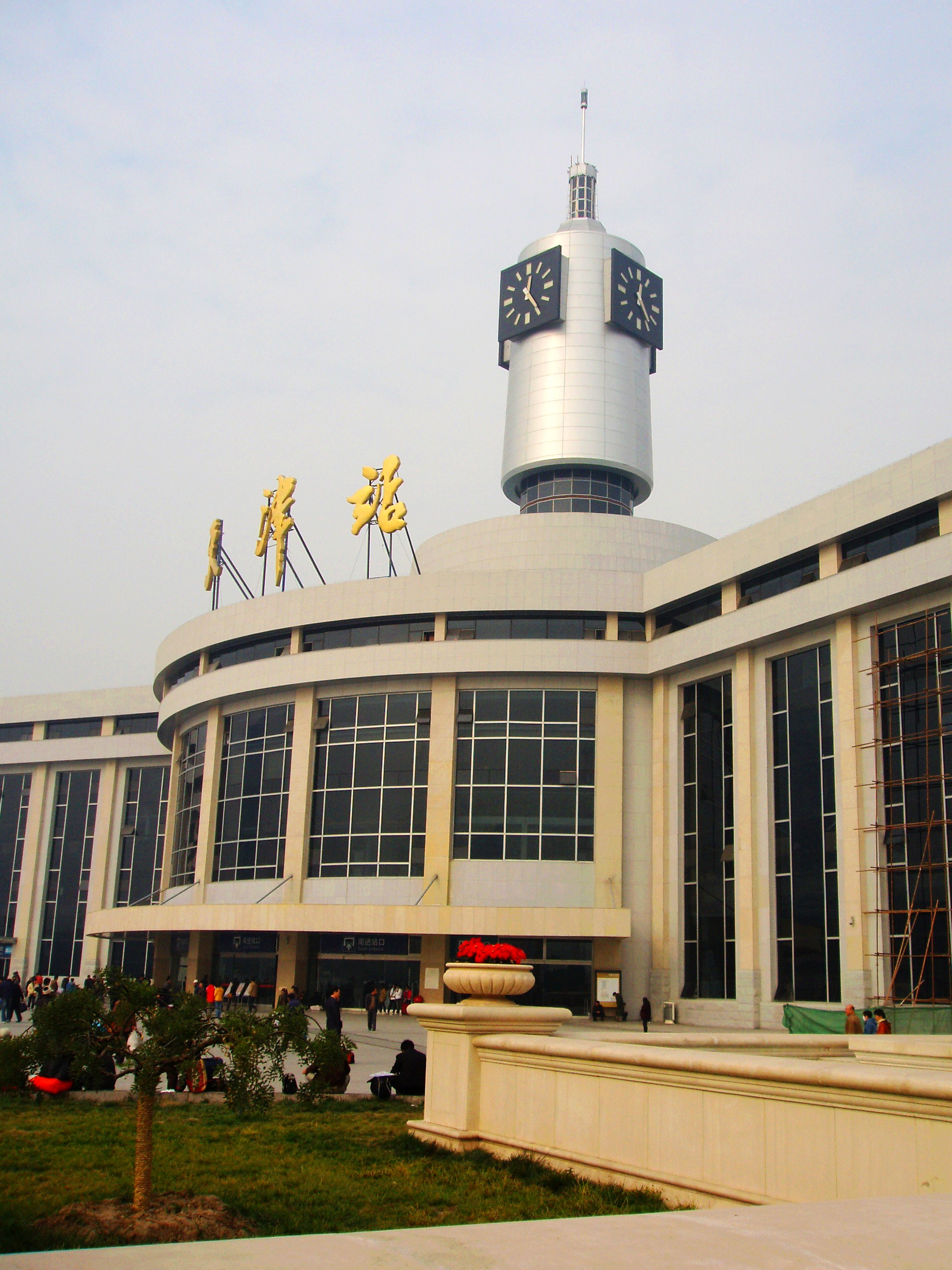
The Tianjin Station after further renovations in 2008.

As a co-host city of the 2008 Beijing Olympics, in order to coordinate the hosting of the Games along with the construction of the Beijing–Tianjin intercity railway and the Tianjin Underground Zhijing Line (天津地下直径线) as well as the introduction of the Jin-Qin Passenger Dedicated Line (津秦客运专线), Tianjin City launched the construction of the "Tianjin Station Traffic Junction". On 15 January, Tianjin Railway Station closed for the first time since its previous reconstruction in 1988. To ensure the project reconstruction could proceed smoothly, the Railway Station's passenger operations were temporarily halted and the bus station of Tianjin (known as the Tianjin Passenger Technology Station) was converted into the "Temporary Passenger Station in Tianjin Station" and was formally put into use as a temporary substitute for traffic. At the same time, the majority of Tianjin Railway Station's bus terminals were moved to the Yueya River train station (月牙河火车站).

== Networks ==
Since 1 October 2012, the station has been connected to the Tianjin Metro network, with Line 2, Line 3, and Line 9 intersecting at the station.

== Station house structure ==
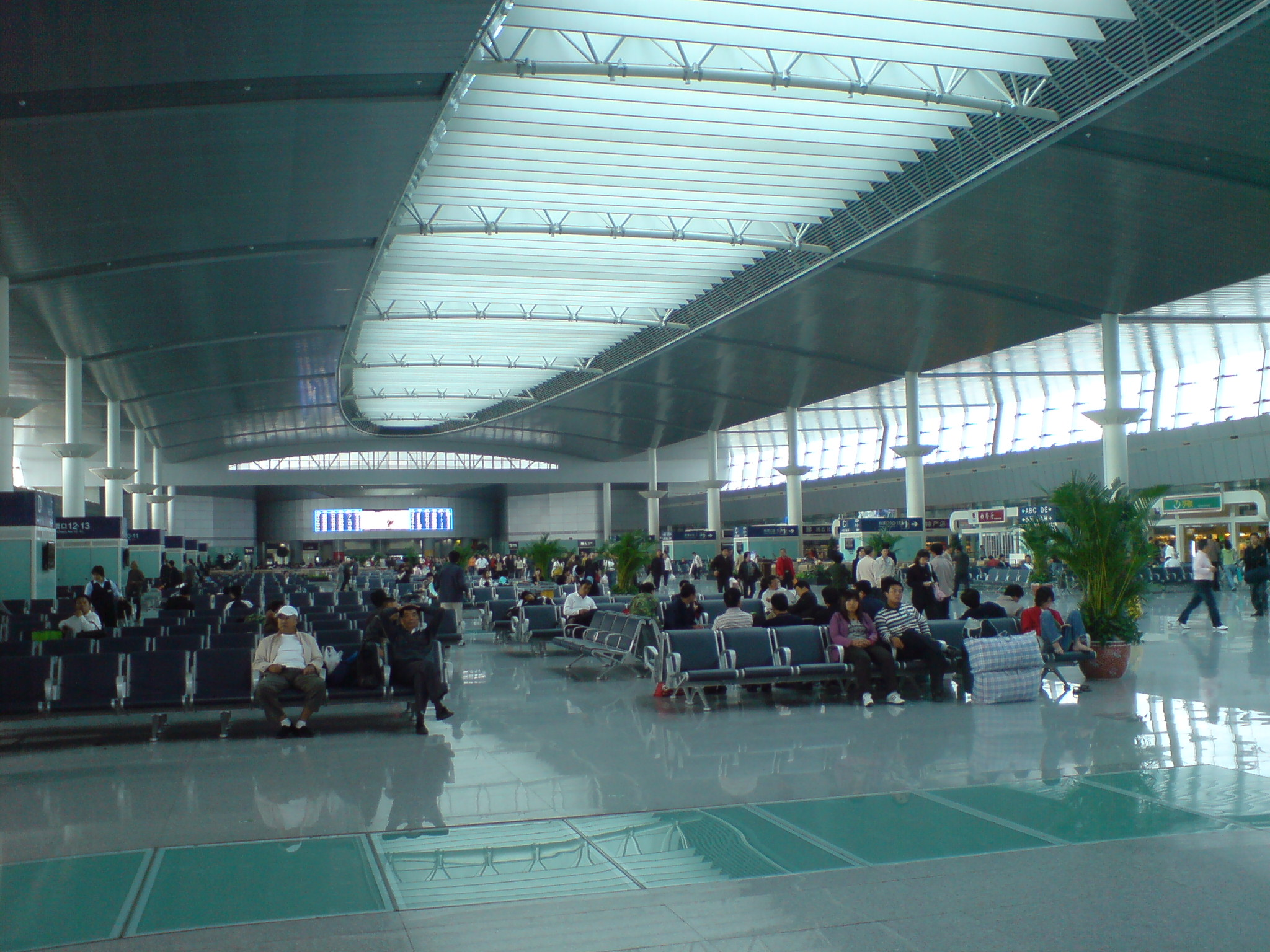
The station waiting room

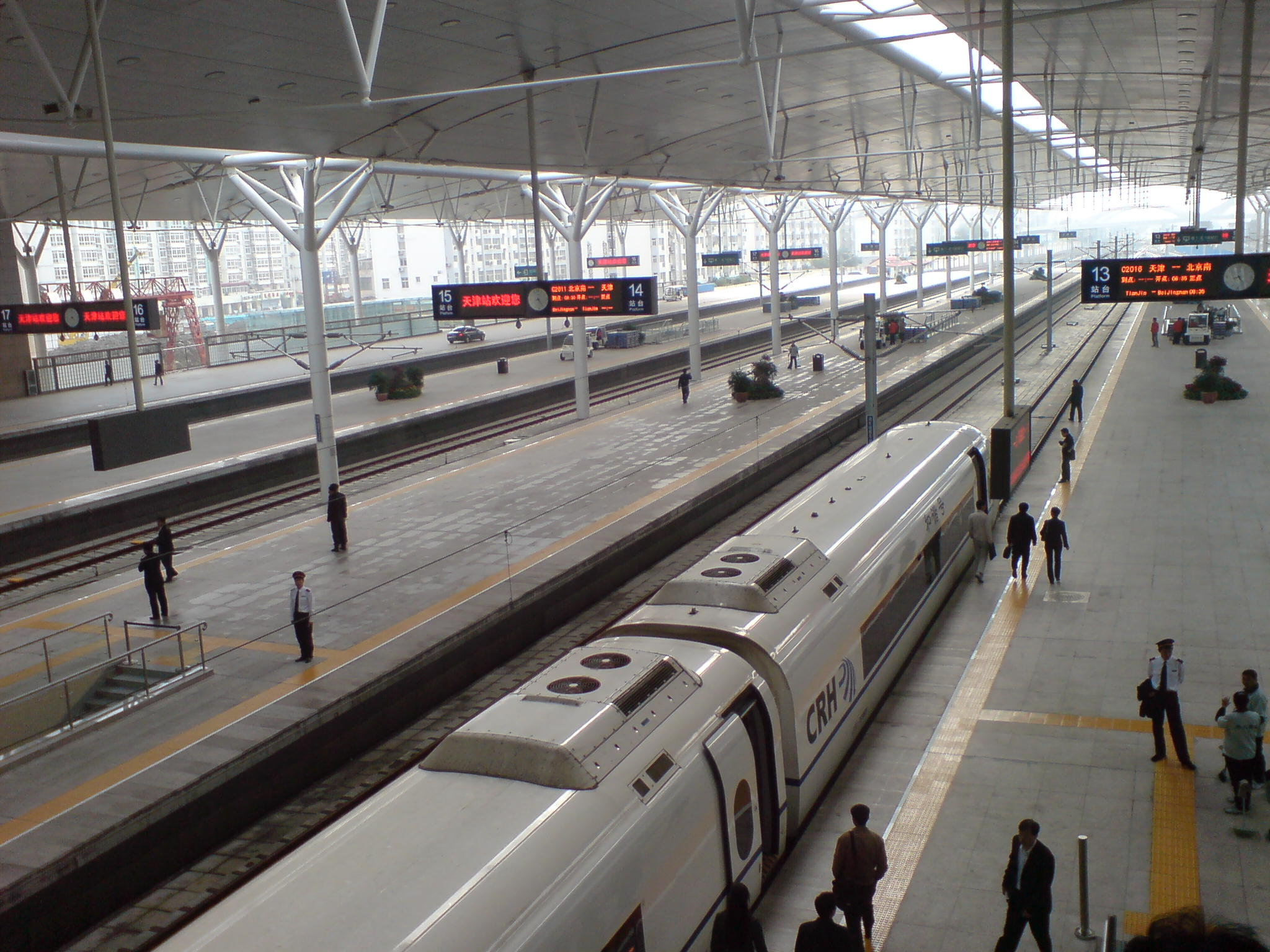
Tianjin Railway Station platform

At present, Tianjin Railway Station includes the Beijing–Tianjin intercity railway and the north station railway. The elevated waiting room, underground pit room, high platform canopy, passenger tunnel, and line package channels have a total construction area of 185,000 square meters (1,991,323 sq ft), of which the newly built North station house comprises 71,000 square meters (764,238 sq ft), the South Station house has 33,000 square meters (355,209 sq ft) and the canopy has 81,000 square meters (871,877 sq ft). The elevated waiting room is 22,000 square meters (236,806 sq ft) and can accommodate 6,000 passengers. The office is located in the basement of the underground pit and has a construction area of 12,400 square meters (133,472 sq ft).

== Dome mural ==
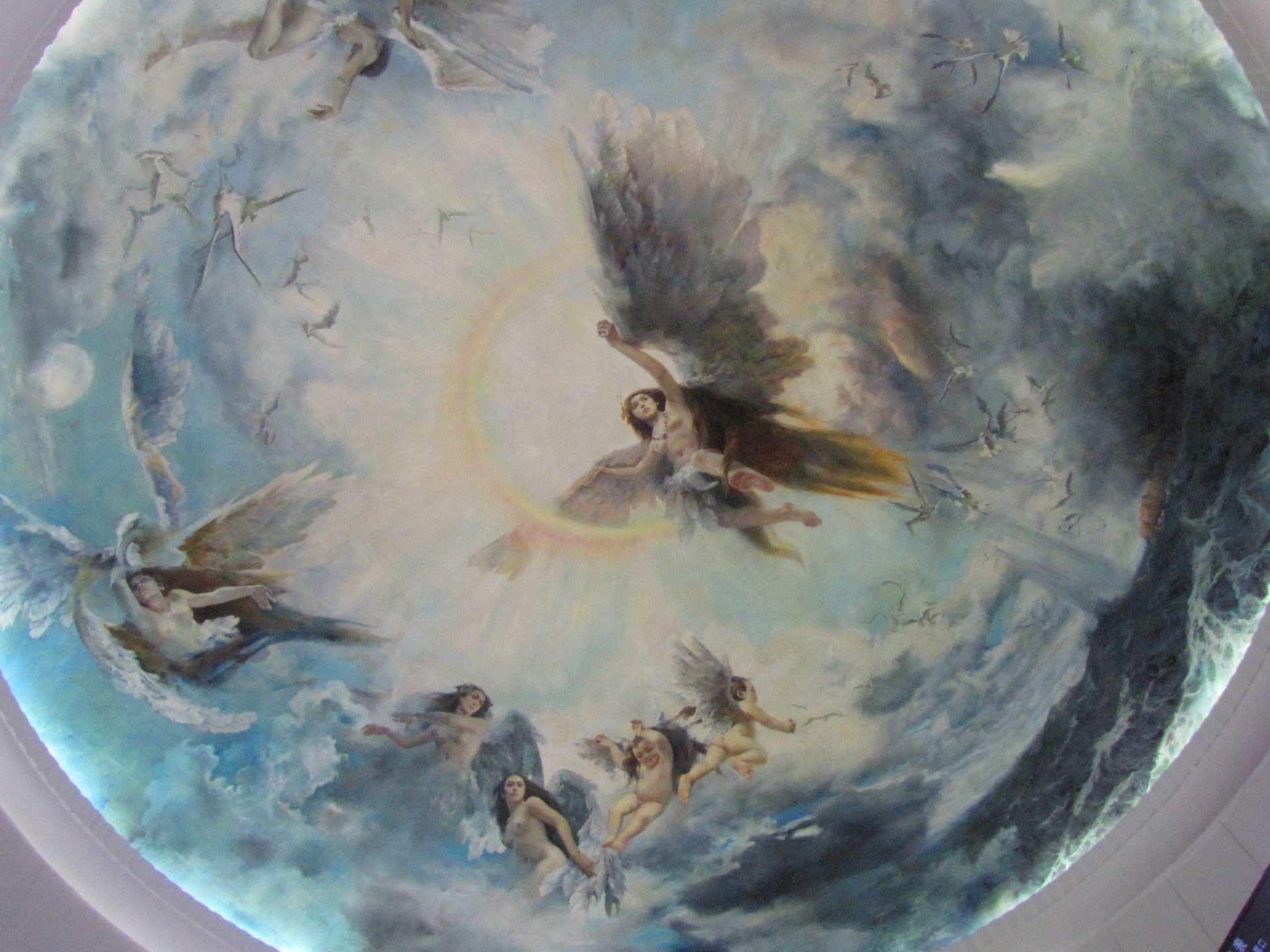
Ceiling of the south entrance hall.

In the spring of 1988, Li Ruihuan, then the Tianjin mayor, inspired by the Sistine Chapel ceiling during his visit to Italy, ordered to paint a similar dome mural for the entrance hall of the station. It took four months to complete the mural before 1 October, the National Day of 1988, by old painter Qin Zheng (秦征) and his students. The subject of the mural is "Jingwei Tries to Fill the Sea", in a Baroque style depiction of a figure in Chinese mythology. Jingwei was depicted as a naked woman with two wings and long hair, which broke the taboo concerning nudity for the first time after the Cultural Revolution. It was once the biggest dome mural in China. In order to protect the oil painting, Tianjin Railway Station became China's first public place to forbid smoking.

== Underground passageways ==
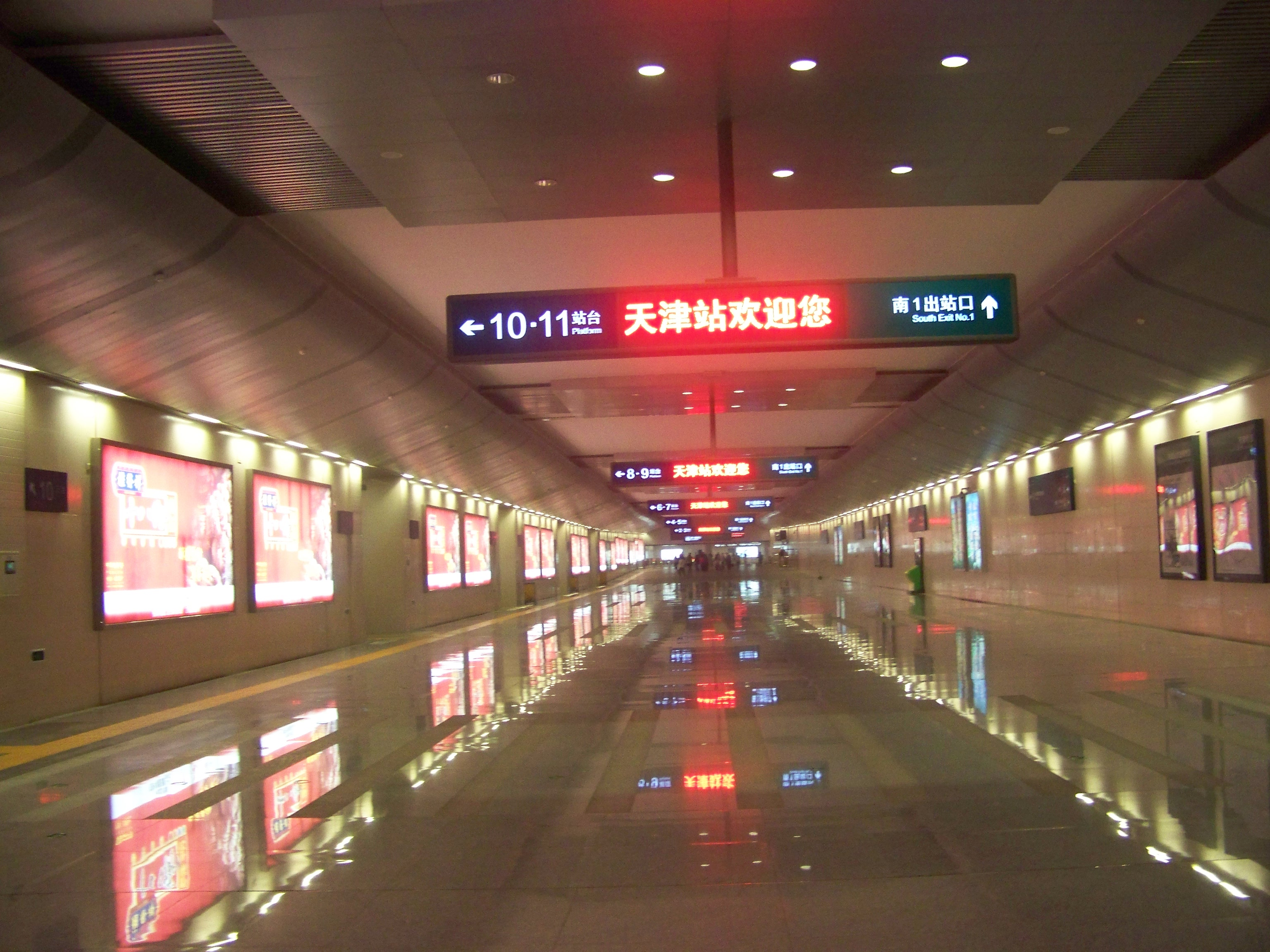
The exit underpass below the platforms

A network of underground passageways exist under the station, providing exit points for passengers from mainline platforms and connecting to the Tianjin Metro which has a transfer hub between its three lines below the station.

== Station scenery ==
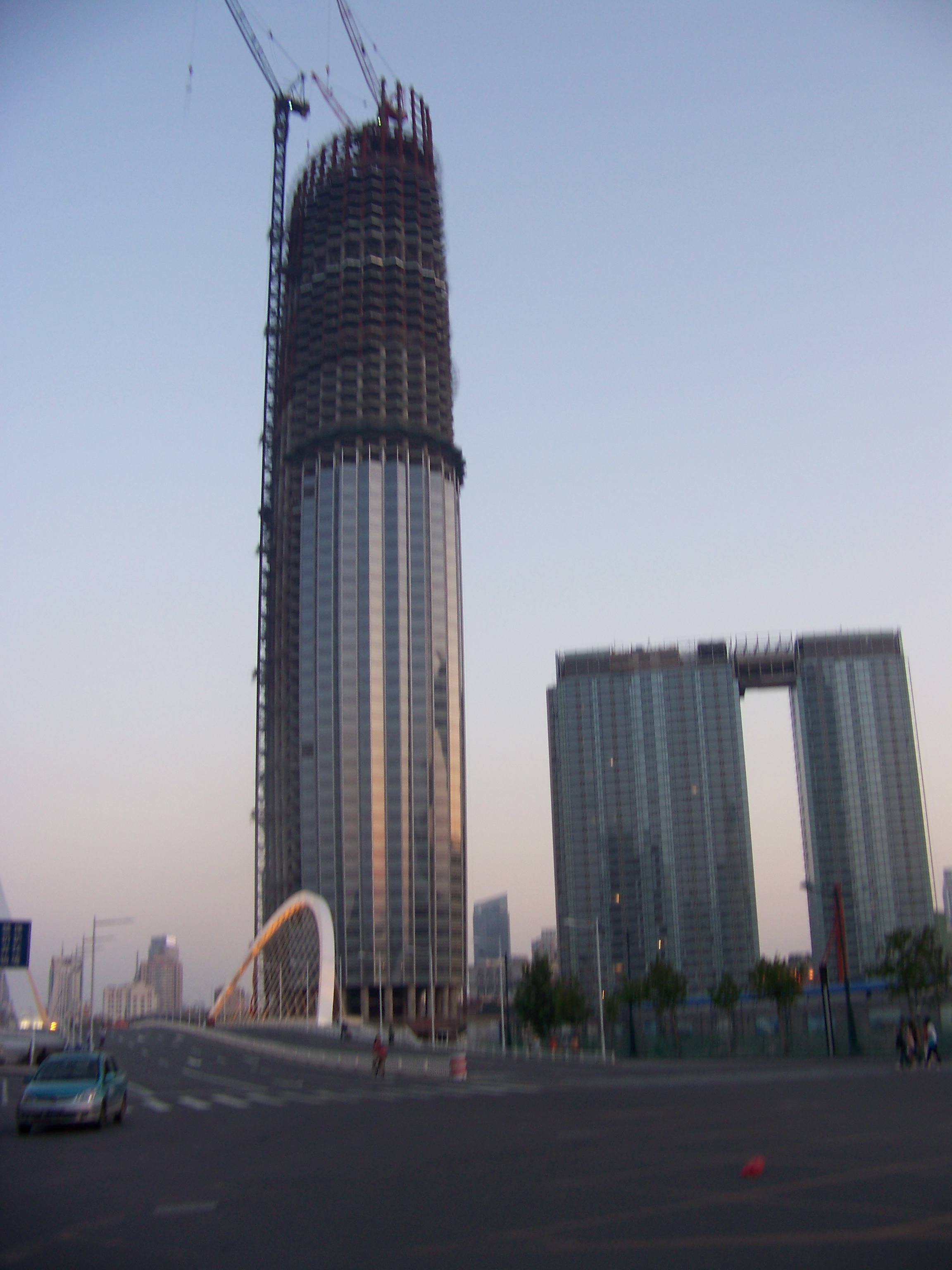
The Jin Tower situated across the Hai River.

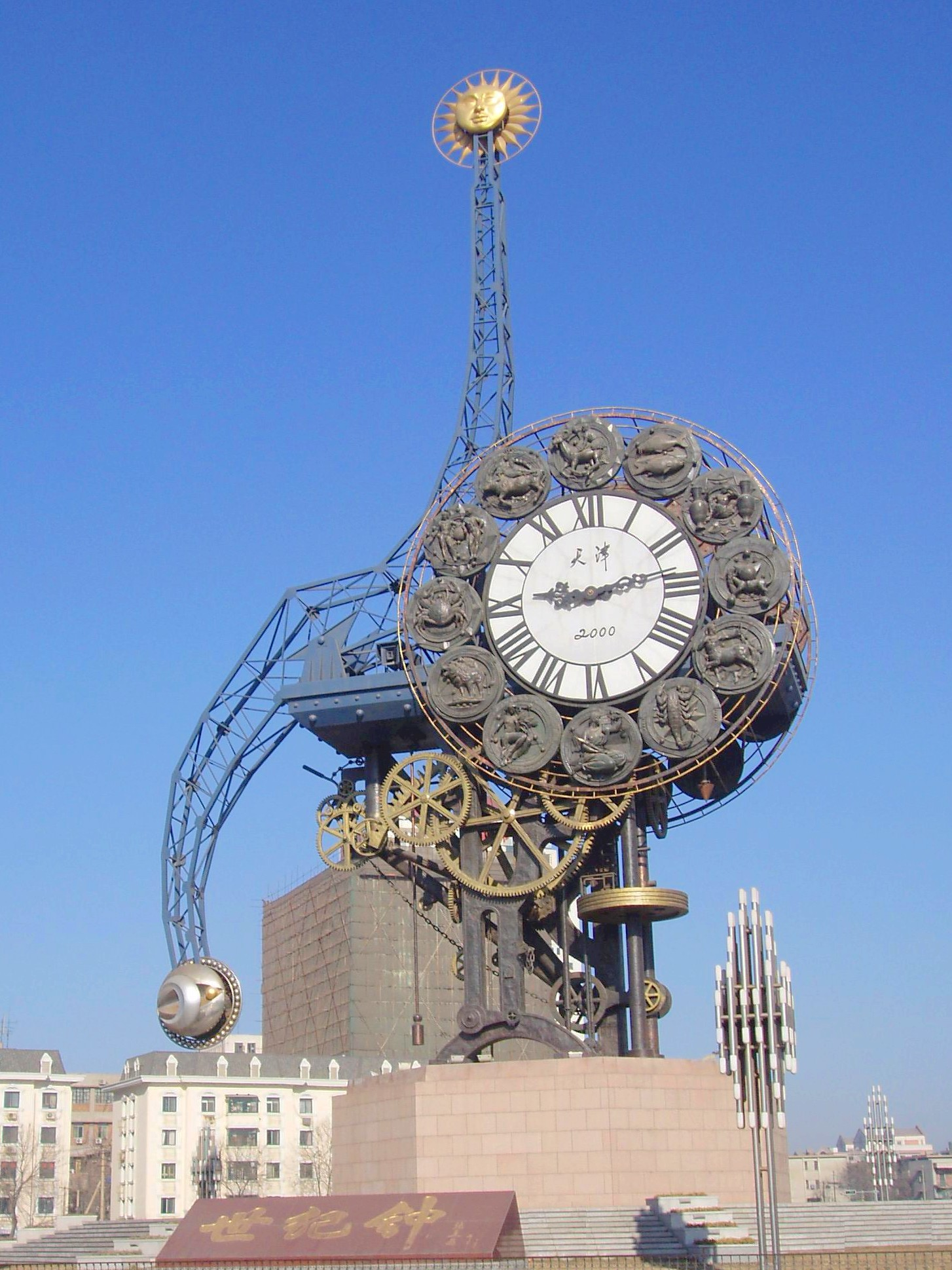
The Tianjin Century Clock in front of the Tianjin Railway Station Square.

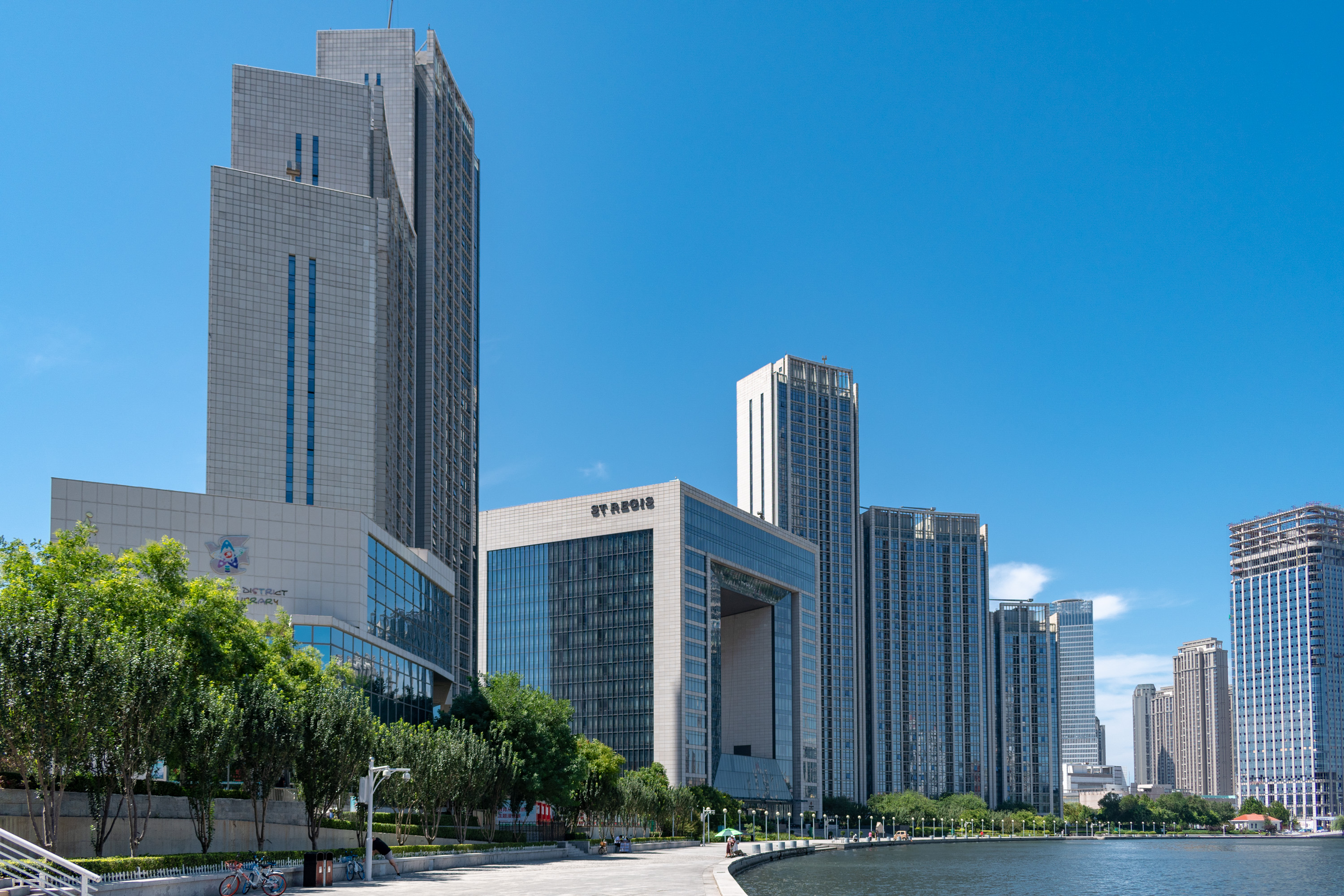
St. Regis Tianjin

== Layout of the ticket window ==
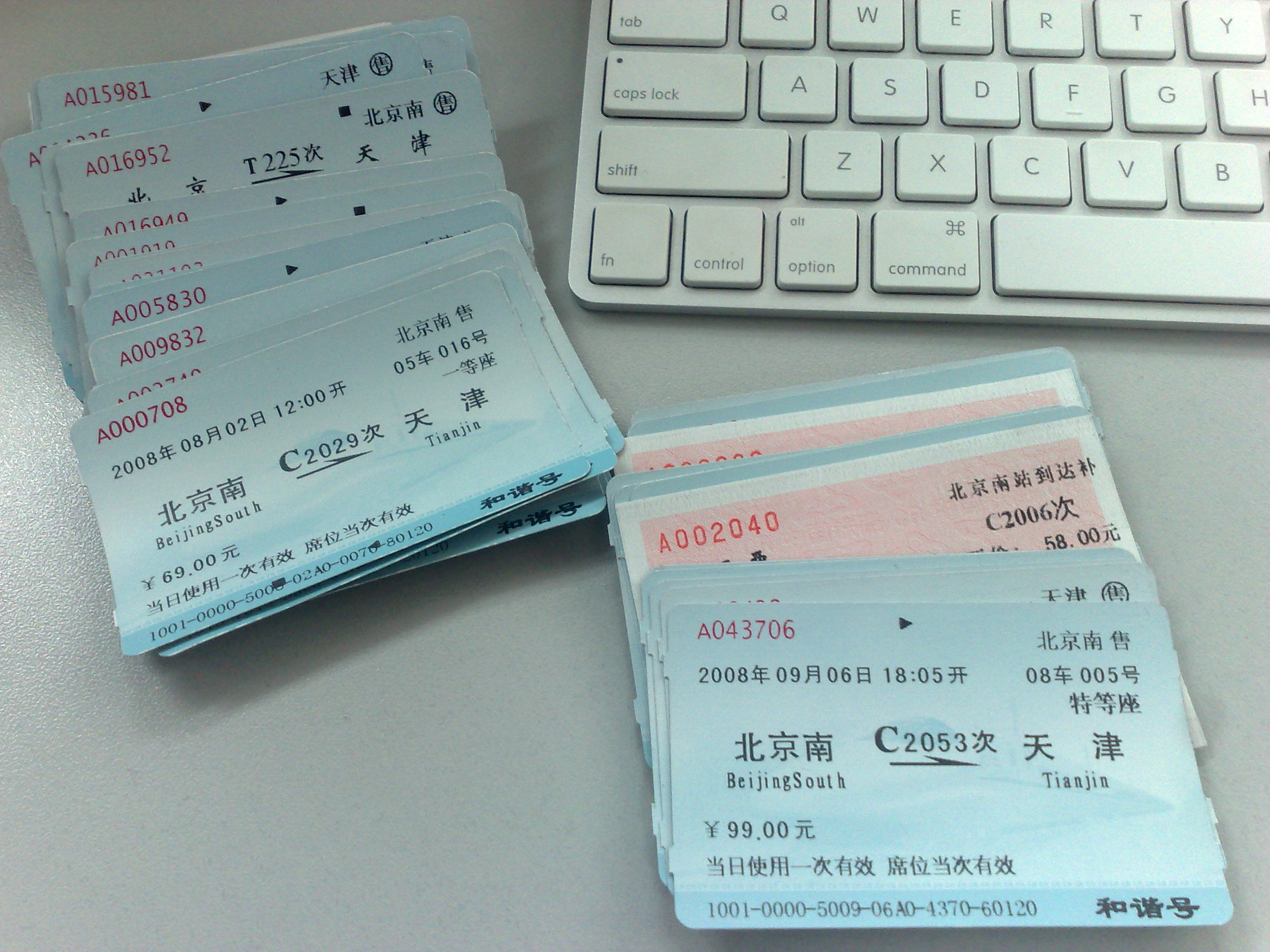
Beijing-Tianjin inter-city tickets.

Inside the train station, there are 62 manual ticket windows, including 23 ticket vending machines of the Beijing–Tianjin intercity railway and 65 sets of automatic entry and exit gates.

Tianjin South Station House Ticket Office	Tianjin North Station House Ticket Office	Beijing-Tianjin Inter-city Self-service Ticket Vending Machines
Window #1: Ticket Access Barrier; Window #2: Duty Director; Window #3: Refund window; Windows #4 to 20, 24 to 30: General Ticket Booth; Window #21: Ticket Offering platform; Window #22: Inquiry Area; Window #23: Signature Transit	Window #1: Beijing-Tianjin Inter-city Signatory; Windows #2 to 6: General Ticket booths; Window #7, 14: Ticket Access Barrier; Windows #8 to 13: Beijing-Tianjin inter-city ticketing	South station ticket house: 7 sets; South station stop hall: 4 sets; North station houses: 5 sets each

== See also ==
- Transport in Tianjin
- Tianjin West railway station
