= Northeast Ring line (BCR) =

Railway line in Beijing, China

Northeast Ring Line

Overview
- Other names: S7; S11 (planned name)
- Termini: Huangtudian; Beijing East
- Stations: 4

Service
- Type: Commuter rail
- System: Beijing Suburban Railway (BCR)
- Operator(s): China Railway Beijing Group
- Rolling stock: CRH6F-A

History
- Opened: TBA

Technical
- Line length: 28.33 km (17.6 mi)
- Track gauge: 1,435 mm (4 ft 8 1/2 in)

Northeast Ring Line of Beijing Suburban Railway (BCR) (Chinese: 北京市郊铁路东北环线; pinyin: Běijīng Shìjiāo Tiělù Dōngběihuánxiàn) is a commuter rail line in Beijing. The local government plans to upgrade the line in the long term to provide urban railway services similar to the Yamanote Line.

The line runs on the existing Beijing Northeast Ring railway (Shuangqiao–Shahe railway). It runs from Huangtudian in Changping District to Beijing East in Chaoyang District. The line will be 28.33 km (17.6 mi) in length with four stations.

== Stations ==
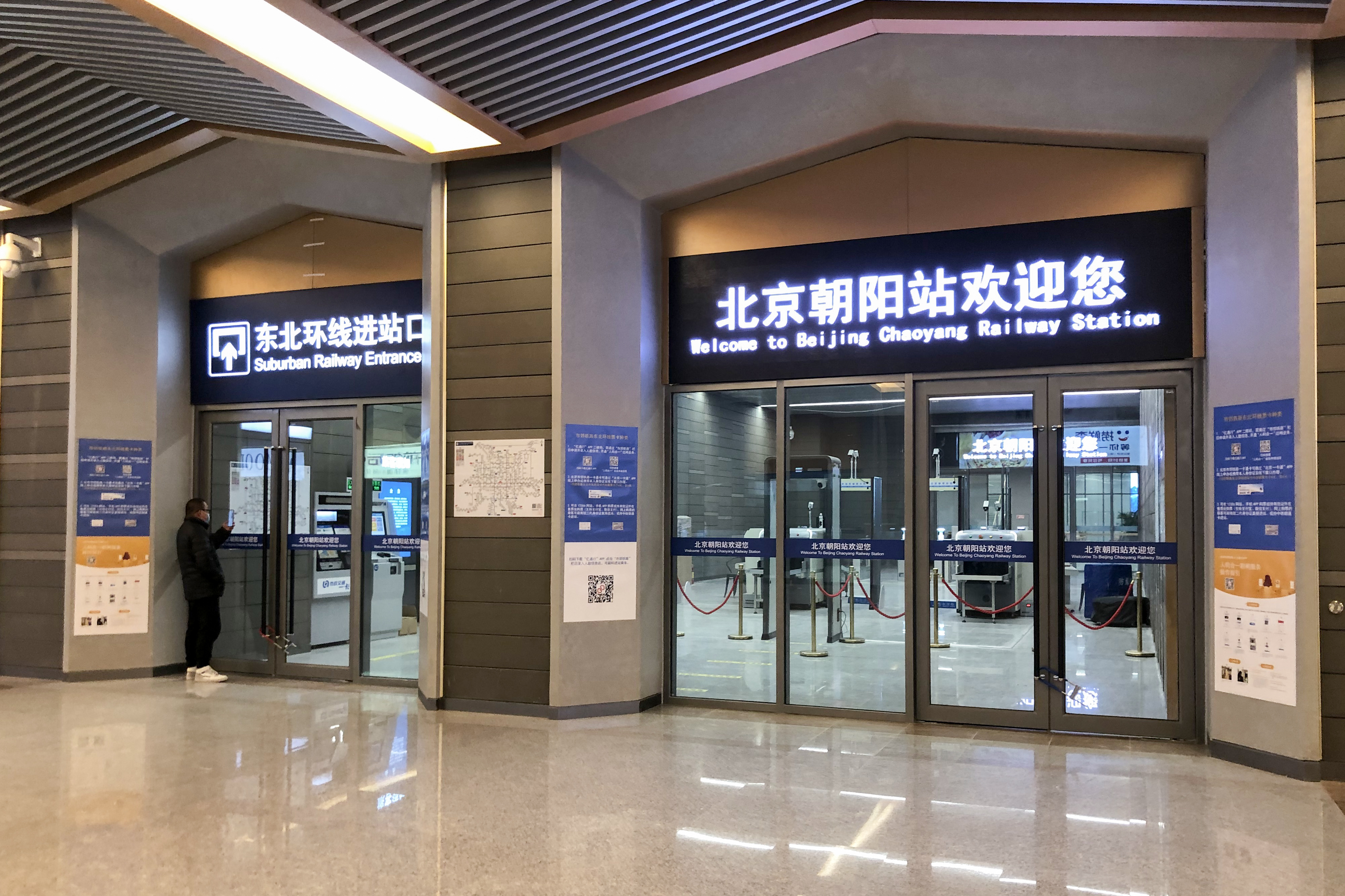
Suburban railway entrance at Beijing Chaoyang railway station in January 2021

| Station Code | Station Name | | Connections | Distance km | Location | Section |
| Station Code | English | Chinese | Connections | Distance km | Location | Section |
|---|---|---|---|---|---|---|
| HKP | Huangtudian | 黄土店 | S2; 8 13 (via Huoying) | | Changping | Beijing Northeast Ring railway |
| | Lishuiqiao | 立水桥 | 5 13 | | Chaoyang | Beijing Northeast Ring railway |
| | Beiyuan | 北苑 | 13 | | Chaoyang | Beijing Northeast Ring railway |
| WFP | Wangjing | 望京 | 14 (via Shangezhuang) | | Chaoyang | Beijing Northeast Ring railway |
| | Jiuxianqiao | 酒仙桥 | 12 | | Chaoyang | Beijing Northeast Ring railway |
| IFP | Beijing Chaoyang | 北京朝阳 | Jingshen; 3 | | Chaoyang | Beijing Northeast Ring railway |
| BOP | Beijing East; Beijingdong | 北京东 | Sub-Central; Jingha; 28 | | Chaoyang | Beijing Northeast Ring railway |
