= Beijing Northeast Ring railway =

Railway line in Beijing, China

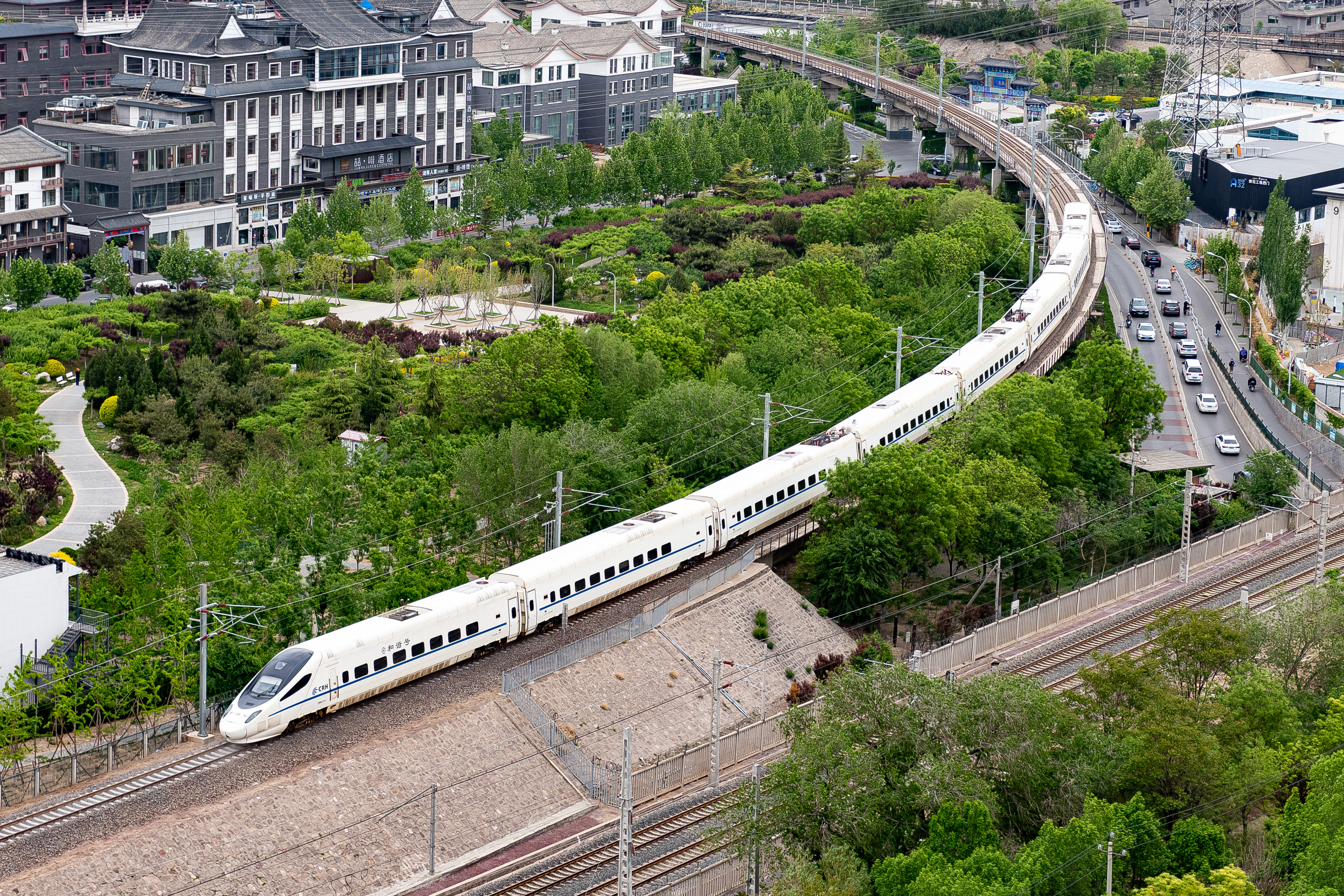
- A CRH5A running D4367 entering the Northeast Ring Railway

Overview
- Status: In operation
- Locale: Chaoyang, Changping; Beijing
- Termini: Baziwan / Shuangqiao / Beijing East; Changping
- Stations: 5

Service
- Type: Heavy rail
- System: China Railway
- Services: Xinghuo, Wangjing, Huangtudian, Shahe
- Operator: China Railway

History
- Opened: December 10, 1968

Technical
- Line length: 36 km (22 mi)
- Number of tracks: 1
- Electrification: 25 kV AC Overhead catenary
- Operating speed: 80

The Beijing Northeast Ring railway (Chinese: 北京东北环线; pinyin: Běijīng dōngběi huánxiàn), also known as Shuangqiao–Shahe railway or Shahe railway, is a link railway in Beijing railway hub.

The line has a total length of 36 km (22 mi) and connects the railway lines in Beijing, including Beijing–Zhangjiakou intercity railway, Beijing–Baotou railway, Beijing–Tongliao railway, Beijing–Shenyang high-speed railway and Beijing–Harbin railway.

== History ==
The rail starts at Baiziwan station on the southeast ring railway, crosses the Beijing–Harbin railway and Tonghui river to the north, turns to the west of Wangjing, and connects with the Beijing–Baotou line 27.850 kilometers (17.305 mi) between Qinghe and Shahe Station, with a total length of 36 kilometers (22 mi). The line was designed by the China Railway Third Design Institute and constructed by the Beijing Railway Bureau. Construction began on January 13, 1960, and in 1961 the track was laid to the north of Xinghuo. In 1961, the construction of Baiziwan was suspended due to the difficulty of relocation and land purchasing. Construction resumed in 1966. By an original industrial railway connecting Beijing East station, the temporary transition rail line opened on December 10, 1968. Train services officially began in January 1972. The whole construction of railway overpasses among Baziwan, Shuangqiao, Beijing East and Xinghuo finished on December 4, 1987.

== Operation ==
All passenger services of station on this railway stopped in 1999 with the second China Railway speed-up project and the last through passenger service (2101/2) was cancelled on May 15, 2016. The line is now mainly used for the movement of empty carriages and freight.

On November 11, 2016, the terminal for suburban rail line S2 was transferred to Huangtudian station. Services will begin to operate on the Northeast Ring suburban rail line before the end of 2020.

Moreover, all type of locomotives, passenger and freight trains made in China, both for China Railway and metros, require several tests on the circular test centre before mass productions, so the Northeast Ring railway is also the only railway line where all trains are translocated by locomotives.

== See also ==
- Rail transport in the People's Republic of China
- List of railways in China
