= Beijing Chaoyang railway station =

Railway station in Beijing

Beijing Chaoyang 北京朝阳
- Beijing Chaoyang railway station in September 2026

General information
- Other names: Xinghuo (1968-2019)
- Location: Chaoyang District, Beijing; China
- Coordinates: 39°56′50″N 116°30′29″E
- Lines: China Railway: Shuangqiao–Shahe railway, Beijing–Shenyang high-speed railway; Beijing Suburban Railway: Northeast Ring line (under testing); Beijing Subway: Line 3
- Platforms: 1 side platform, 6 island platforms

Construction
- Structure type: in level, elevated

Other information
- Station code: 11389 (TMIS code); IFP (telegram code); BJY (pinyin code)
- Classification: 2nd class station

History
- Opened: 1968 (Old Railway Station); 22 January 2021 (New Railway Station); 15 December 2024 (Line 3 of Beijing Subway)

Services
Preceding station	China Railway High-speed	Following station
Beijing Terminus	Beijing–Shenyang high-speed railway Part of the Beijing–Harbin high-speed railway	Shunyi West towards Shenyang
Preceding station	China Railway	Following station
Beijing East towards Beijing North	Beijing–Baotou railway	Wangjing towards Baotou
Location
- Location within Beijing

Beijing Chaoyang railway station (Chinese: 北京朝阳站; pinyin: Běijīng Cháoyáng Zhàn), formerly known as Xinghuo railway station (Chinese: 星火站; pinyin: Xīnghuǒ Zhàn), is a railway station in Chaoyang District, Beijing. This station is the main terminus of the Beijing–Harbin high-speed railway, and one of eight main passenger-service stations of the Beijing railway hub.

== History ==
Station construction began in 1966 with the proposed name of Xinzhuang railway station, named after the nearby village. However, there had been a station with the same name in Tianjin. When the station opened in 1968, it was named Xinghuo railway station, after the Xinghuo People's commune (Chinese: 星火人民公社) (now Liulitun Subdistrict), and the Xinghuo People's commune is named after a famous article written by Mao Zedong, A Single Spark Can Start a Prairie Fire (Chinese: 星星之火，可以燎原).

Xinghuo railway station had been a passenger-service station for through trains on the Beijing–Baotou railway (Shuangqiao-Shahe railway), but all passenger services were canceled in 1996 with the speed-up projects. It has been an industrial freight station linking factories including a granary, a cotton depot, a thermal power plant, and the China National Railway Track Test Center (famous for the loop track).

In 2013, Xinghuo railway station was confirmed as the largest terminus of the planned Beijing–Shenyang high-speed railway and renovations began in 2017. During the 2020 Two Sessions, CPPCC member Pi Jianlong advised that the station name should be changed to Beijing Chaoyang railway station for the Chaoyang District in Beijing. Investigated and surveyed by the related ministries and commanded by the Premier, the station formally changed its name to Beijing Chaoyang railway station in June 2020, and the former Chaoyang railway station in Liaoning Province changed its name to Liaoning Chaoyang railway station.

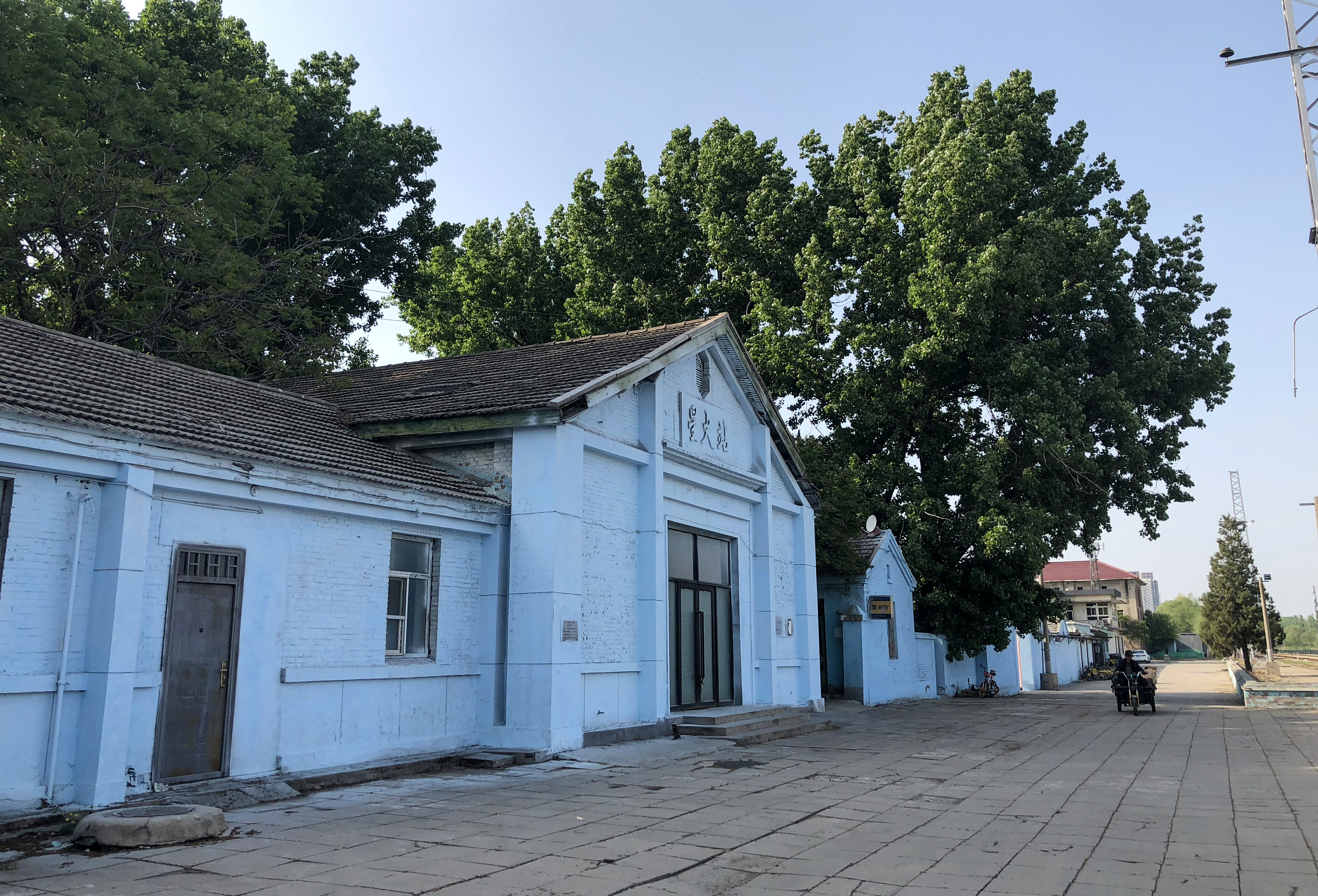
Former Xinghuo railway station hall (2018)

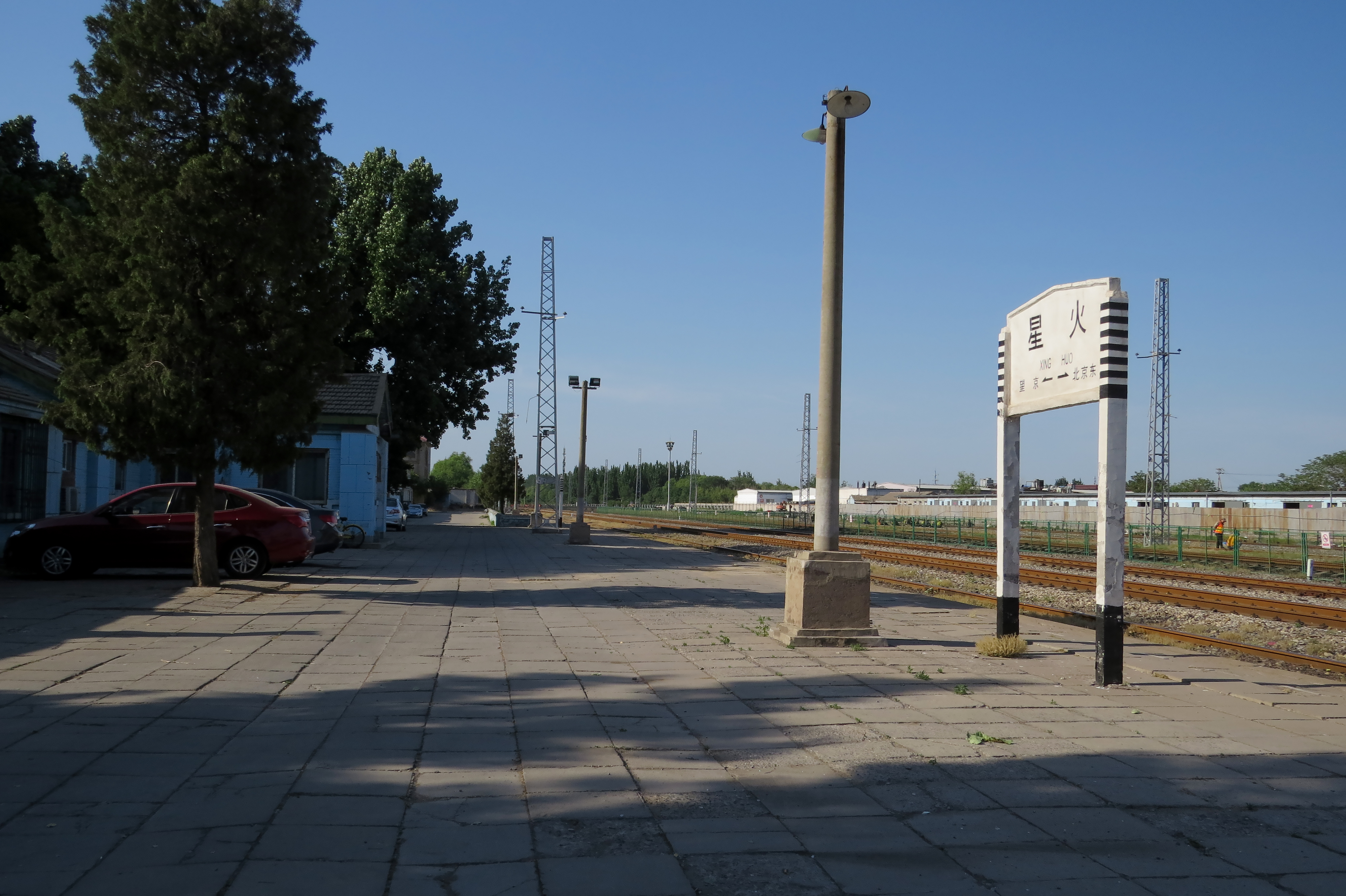
Former basic platform of Xinghuo railway station (2018)

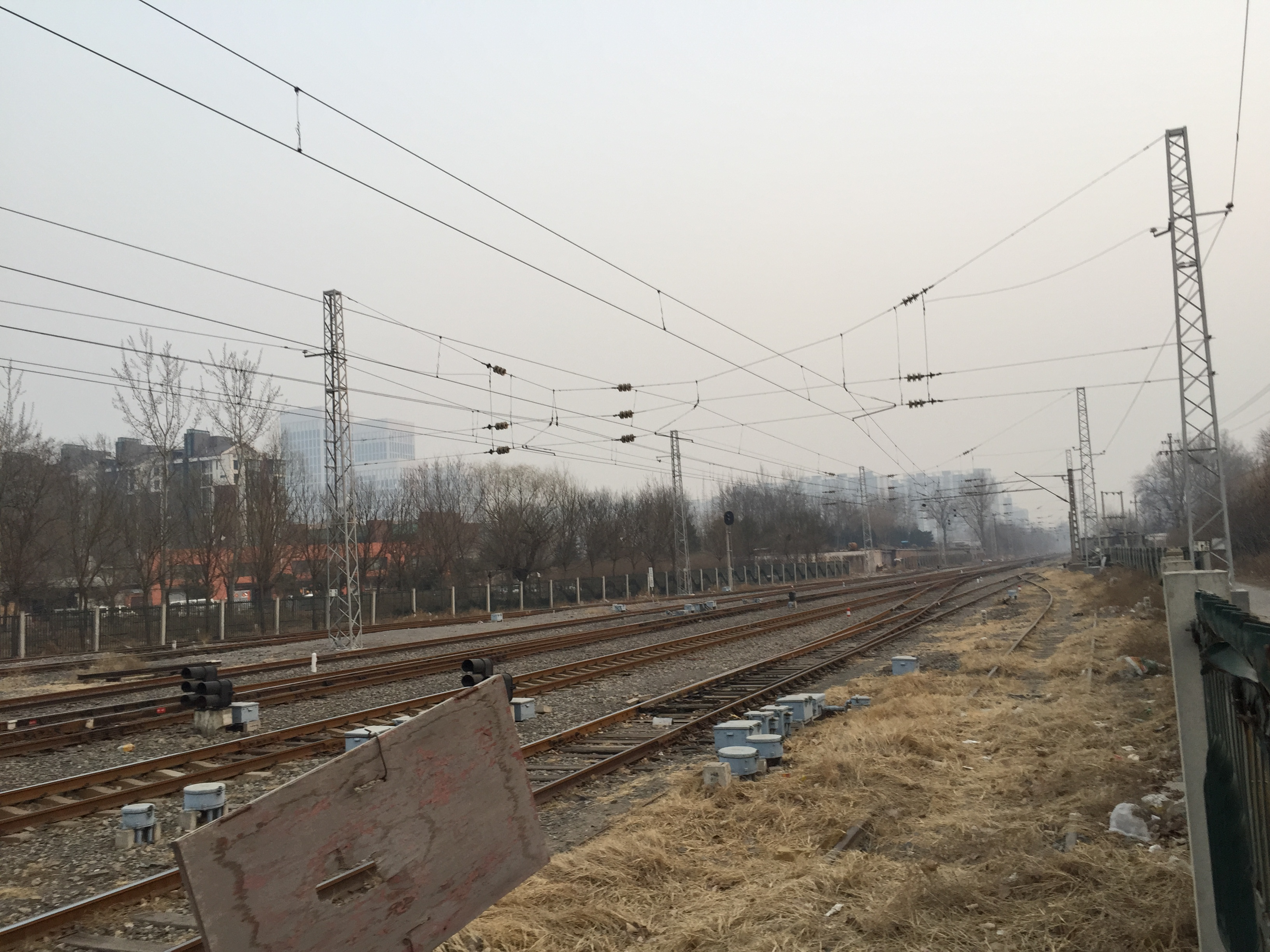
Former station yard and sidings of Xinghuo railway station (2015)

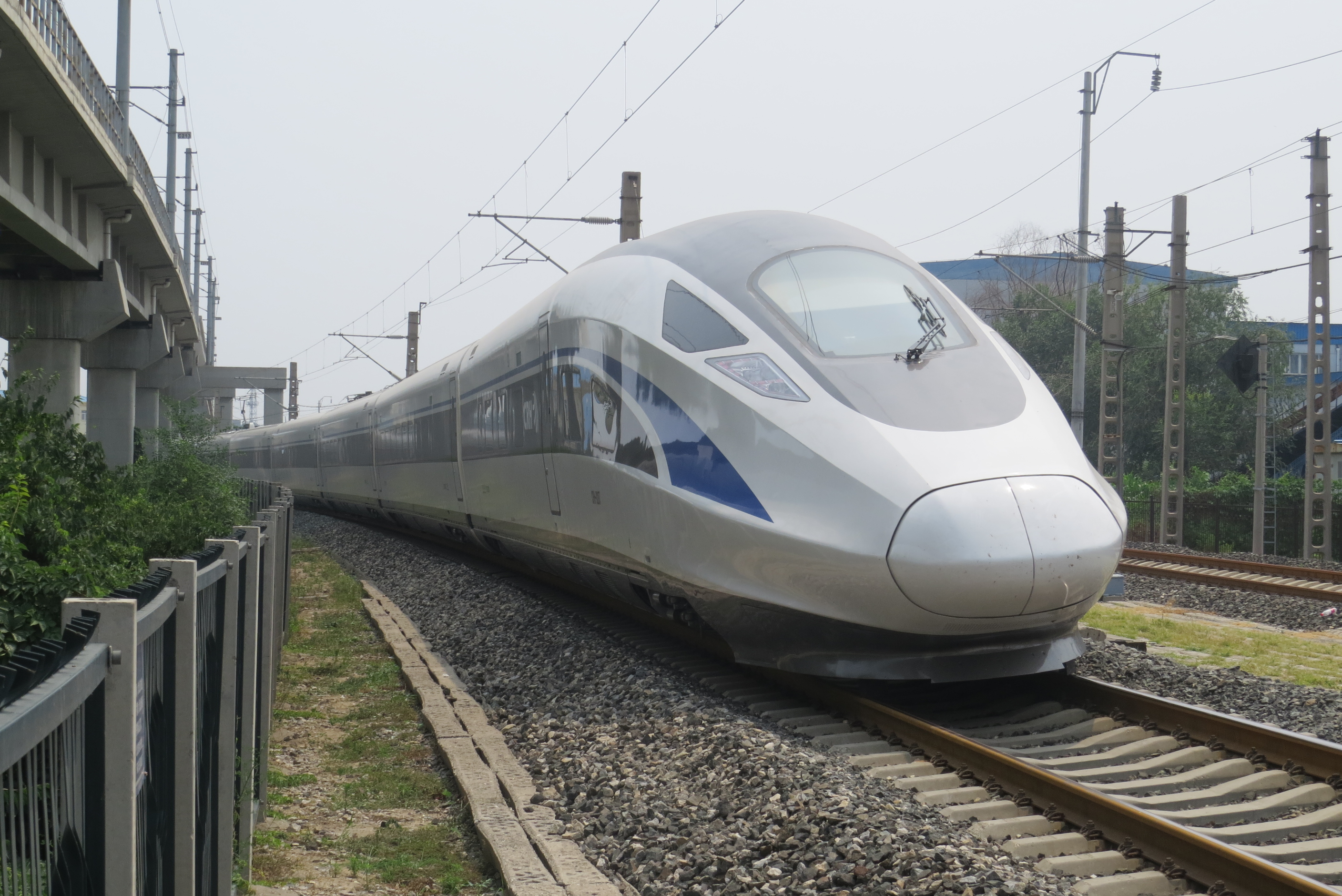
A test train running on the National Railway Track Test Center's loop track

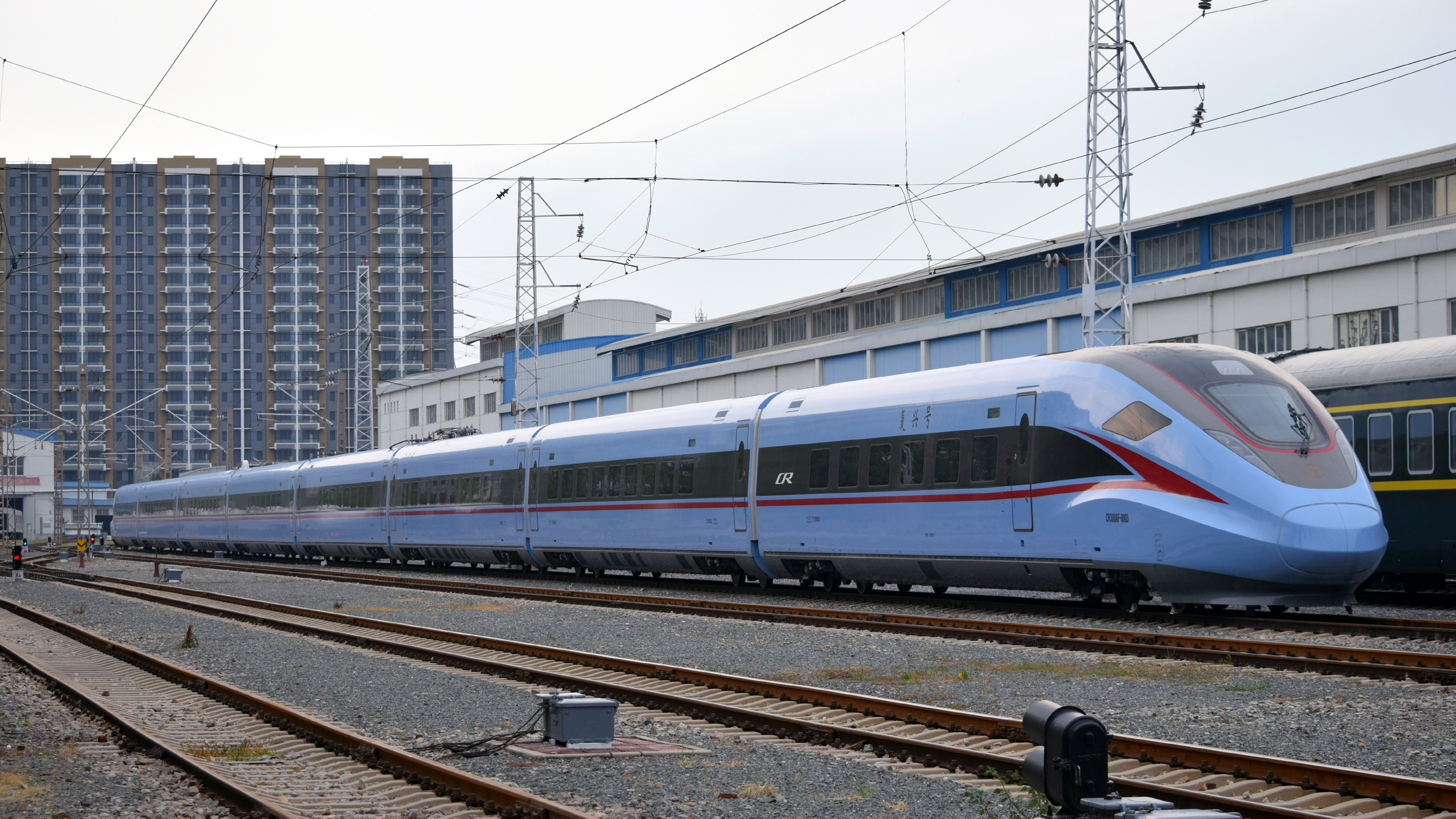
A test train stopped in the NRTTC. All new train models need to be examined in the NRTTC at Beijing Chaoyang railway station.

== Renovation ==
The Beijing Chaoyang railway station has seven platforms and 15 lines (excluding two freight lines outside the station building) for a building area of 183,000 square metres (1,970,000 sq ft) after renovation. The station is collaborated designed by AREP and China Railway Design Corporation since 2016. The construction began in 2018 by China Railway 6th Bureau Group and China Railway Construction Engineering Group, and capped on 30 May 2020 and finished decoration in the end of 2020.

The new station began operation on 22 January 2021.

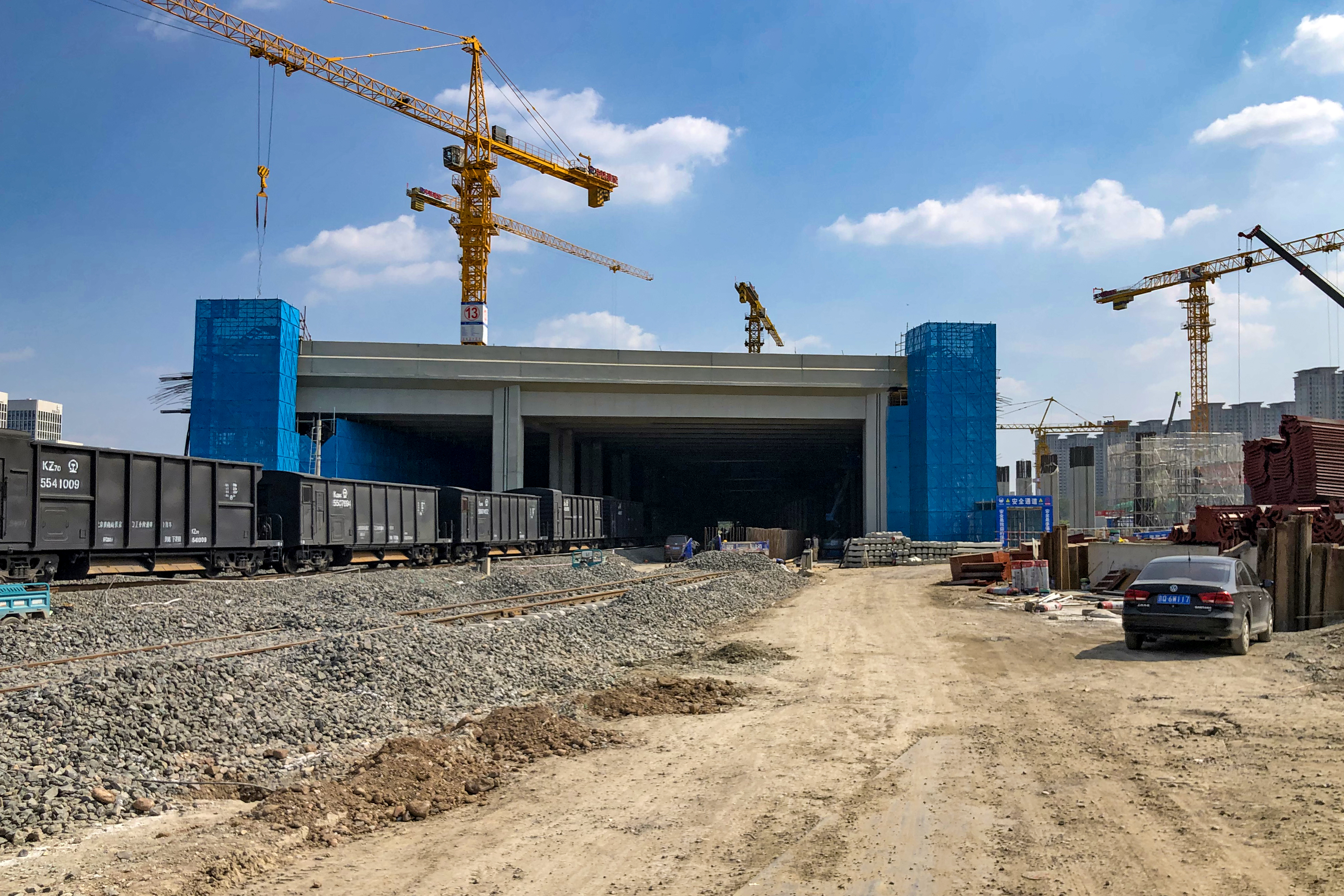
Construction site in 2019

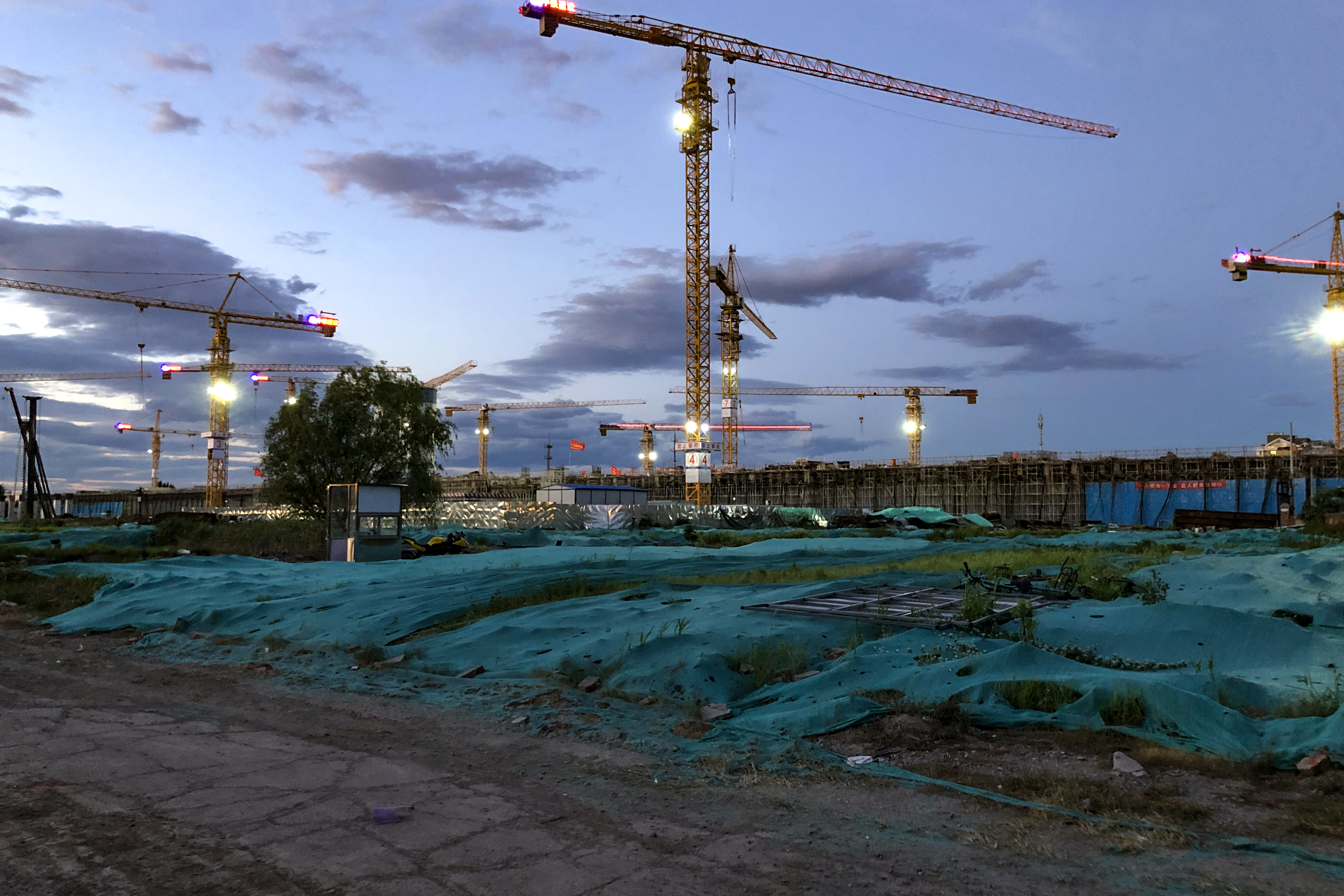
Construction site in 2019

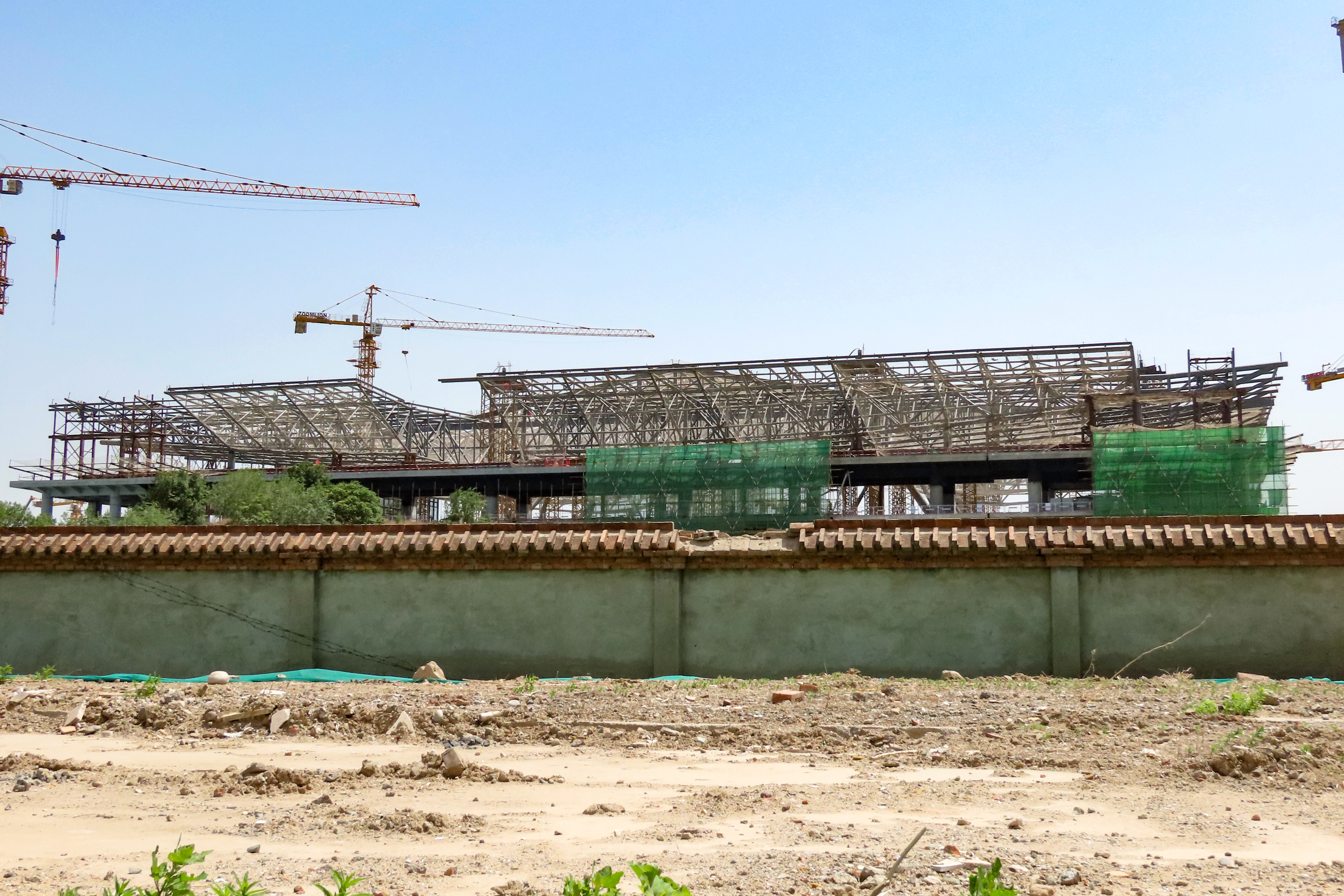
Construction site in the early 2020

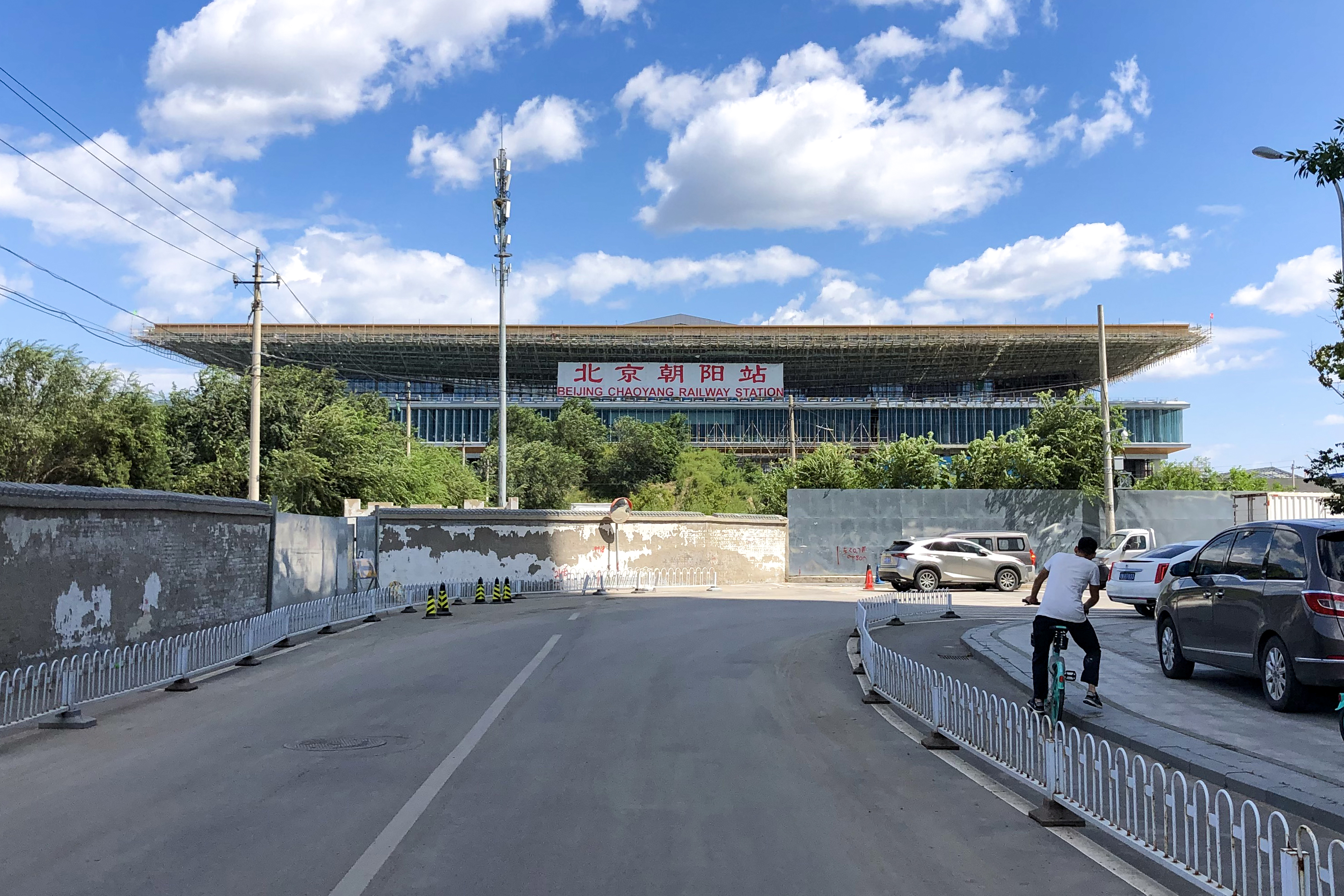
The station under decoration in 2020

== Design and structure ==
Beijing Chaoyang station building can be divided into the central part and the west part, in which the central part covers 110,000 square meters, and the west part covers 70,000 square meters. The architectural design theme shows the vitality of the city, satisfying the general requirements of becoming an integrated, green, warm, economic, and convenient transportation hub. The outside facade is a three-segment shape that blends traditional culture and modernity. The glass curtain wall on the north side of the building not only broadens the view and for day lighting, but also hints at the direction of Shenyang, the other end of the line. The upper roof image is derived from the roofs of the ancient Forbidden City.

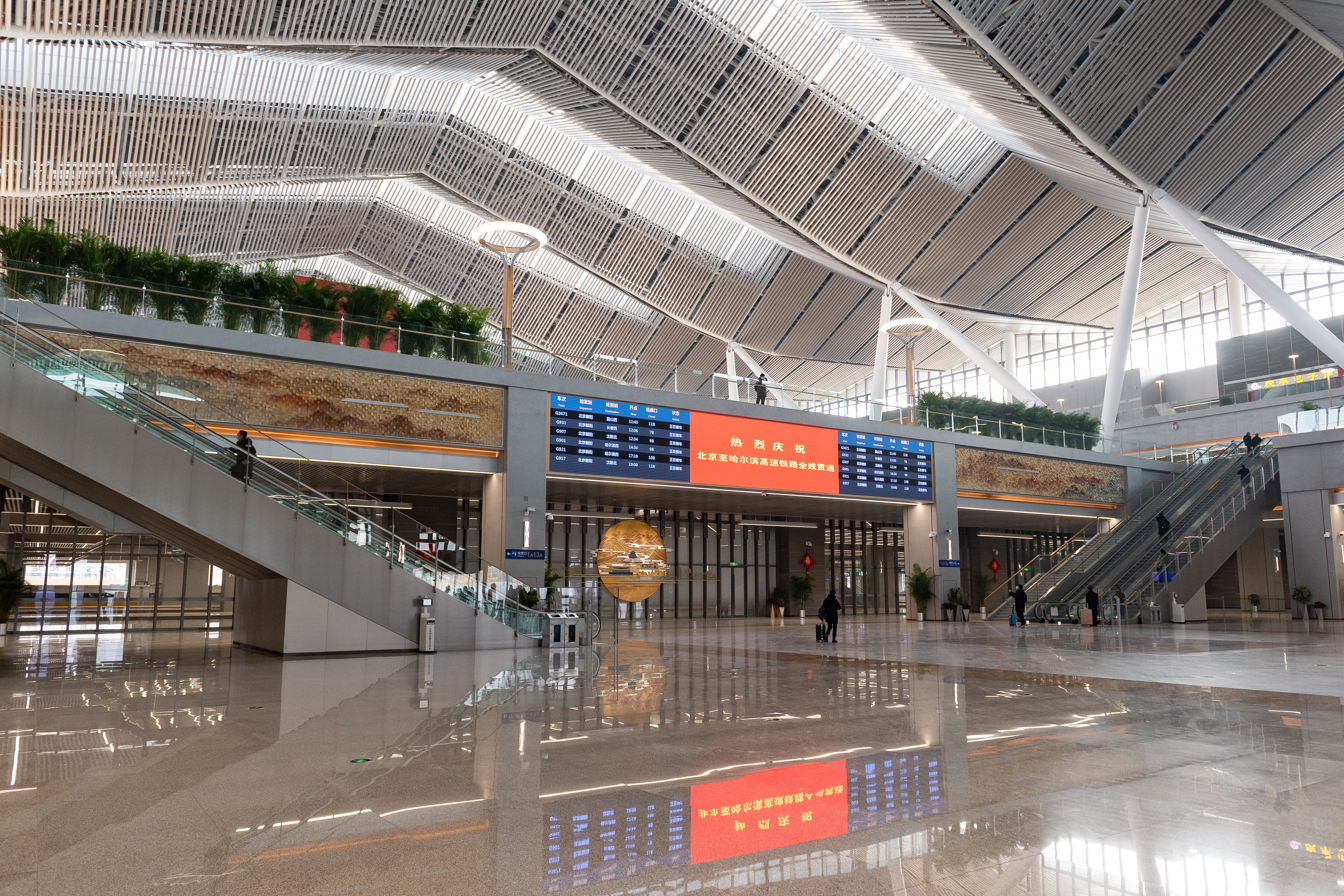
West lobby

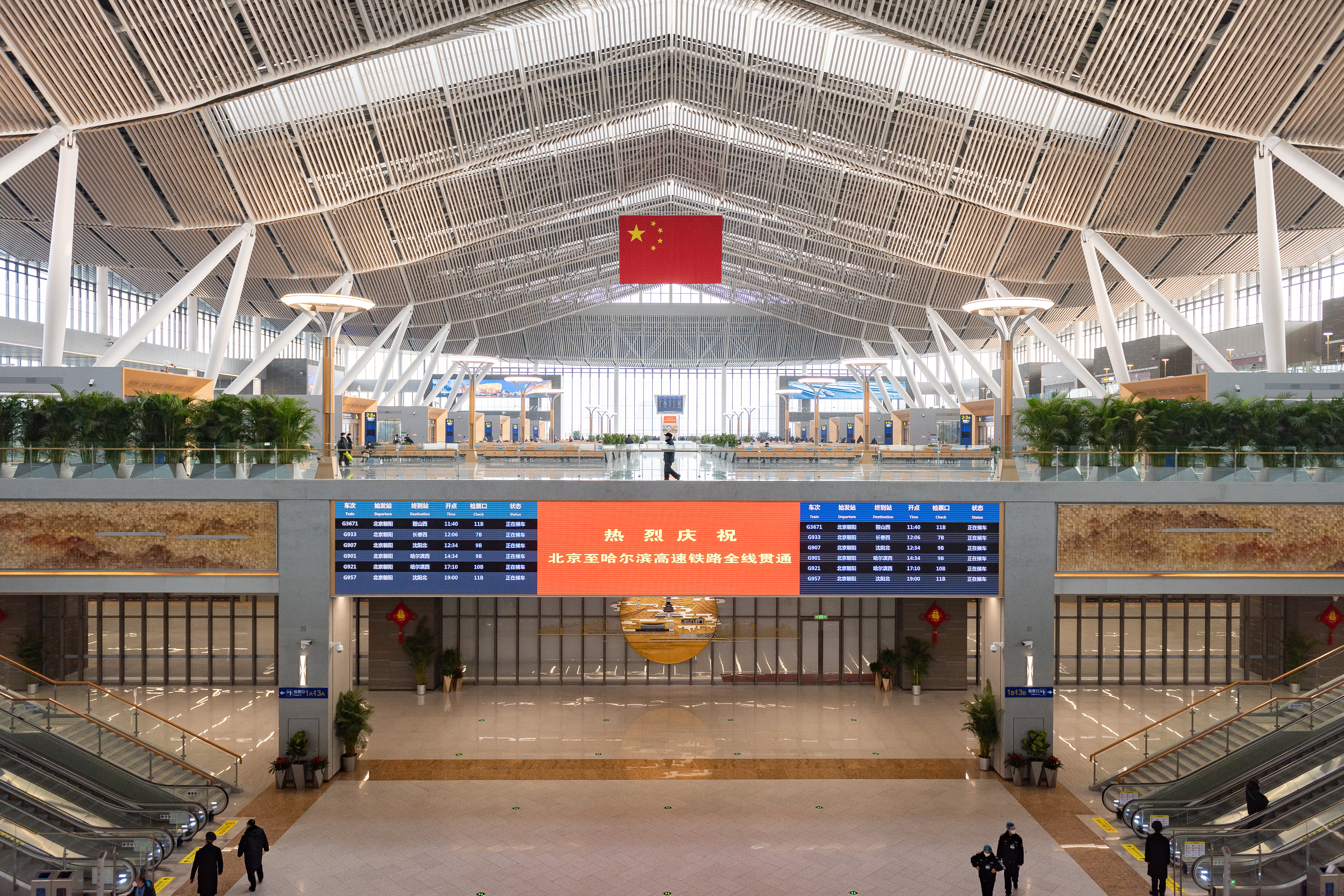
Waiting hall

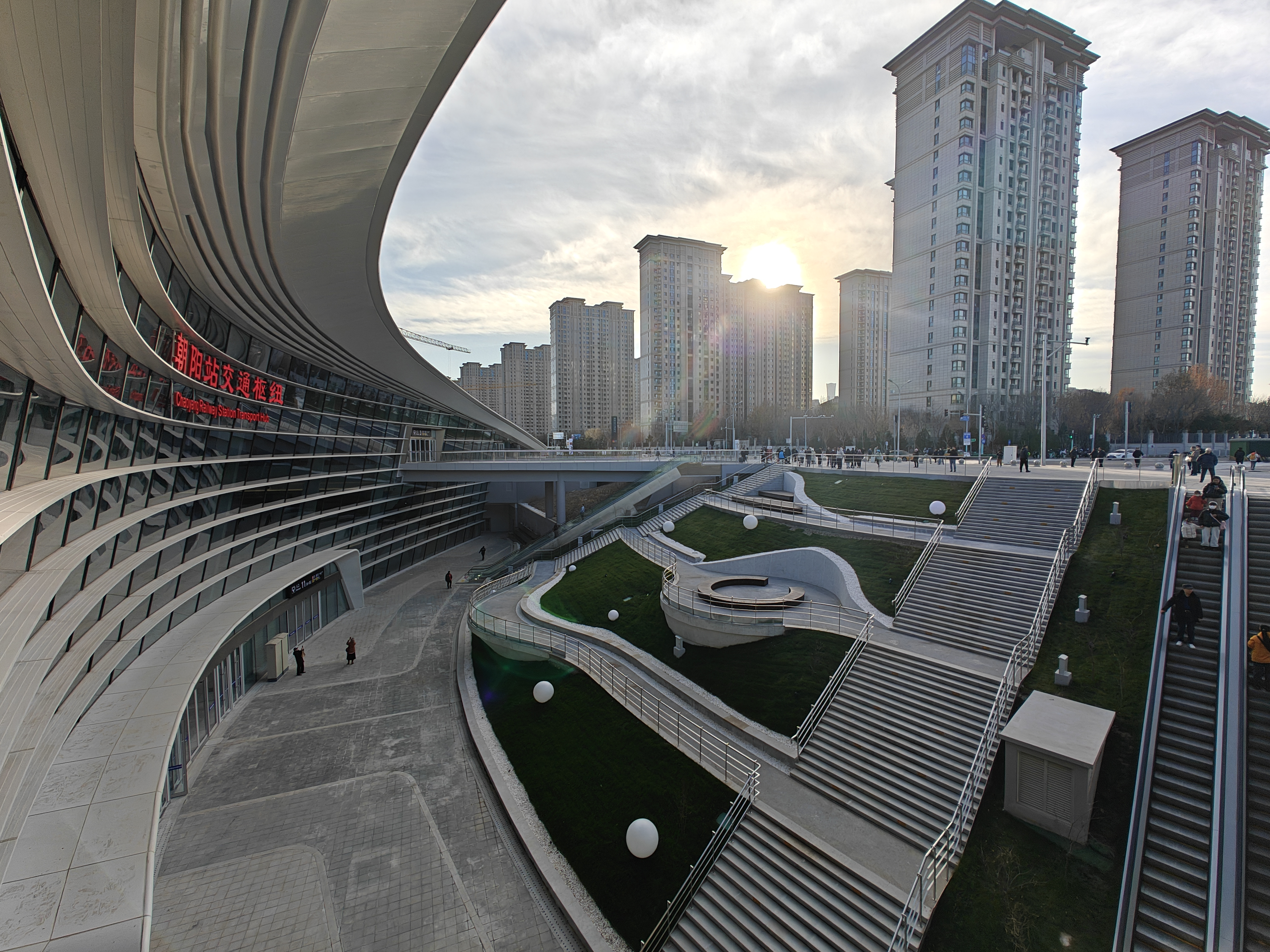
Exterior of Chaoyang Railway Station Transport Hub

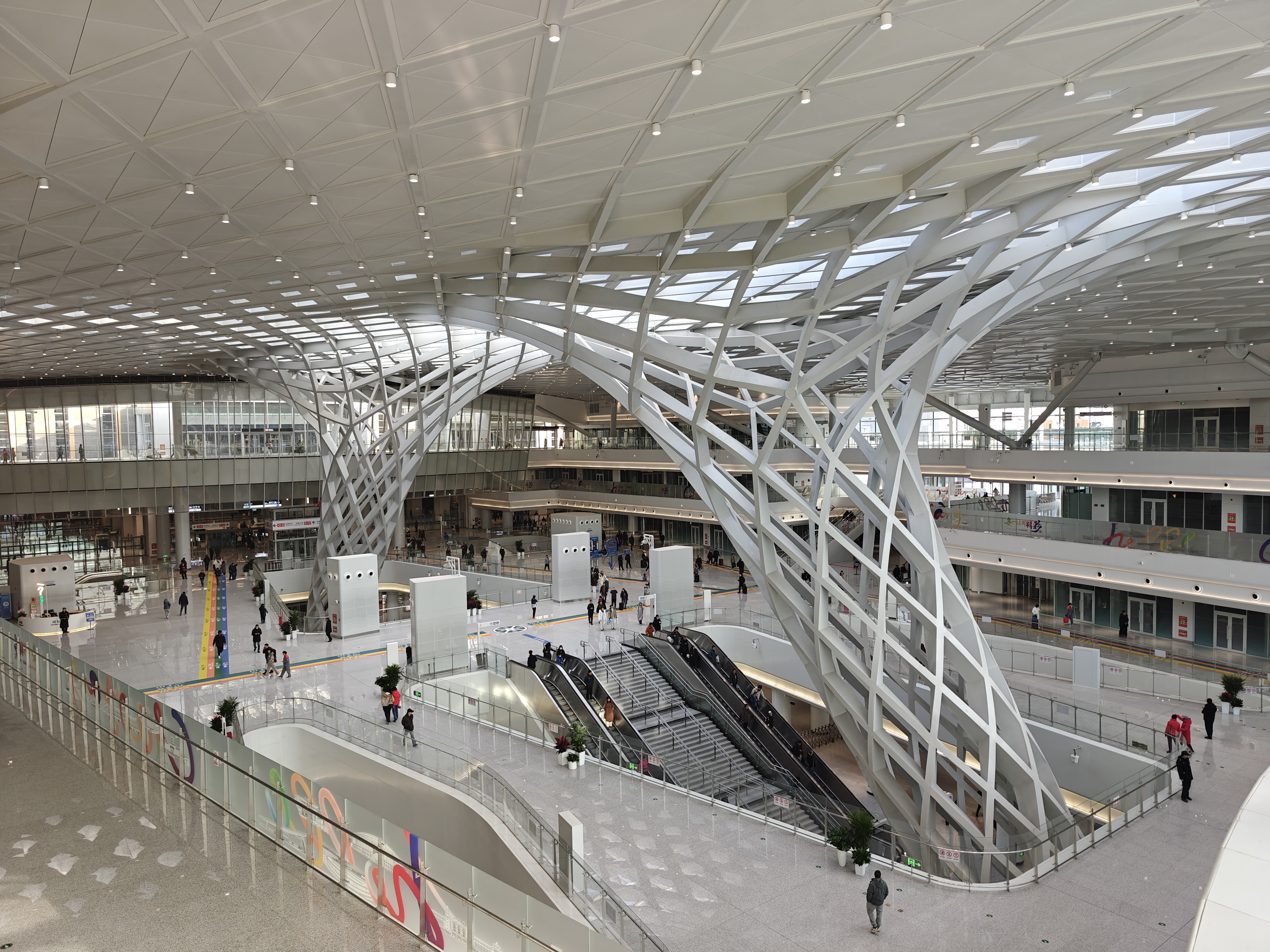
Interior of Chaoyang Railway Station Transport Hub

== Beijing Subway ==
Chaoyang Railway Station 朝阳站
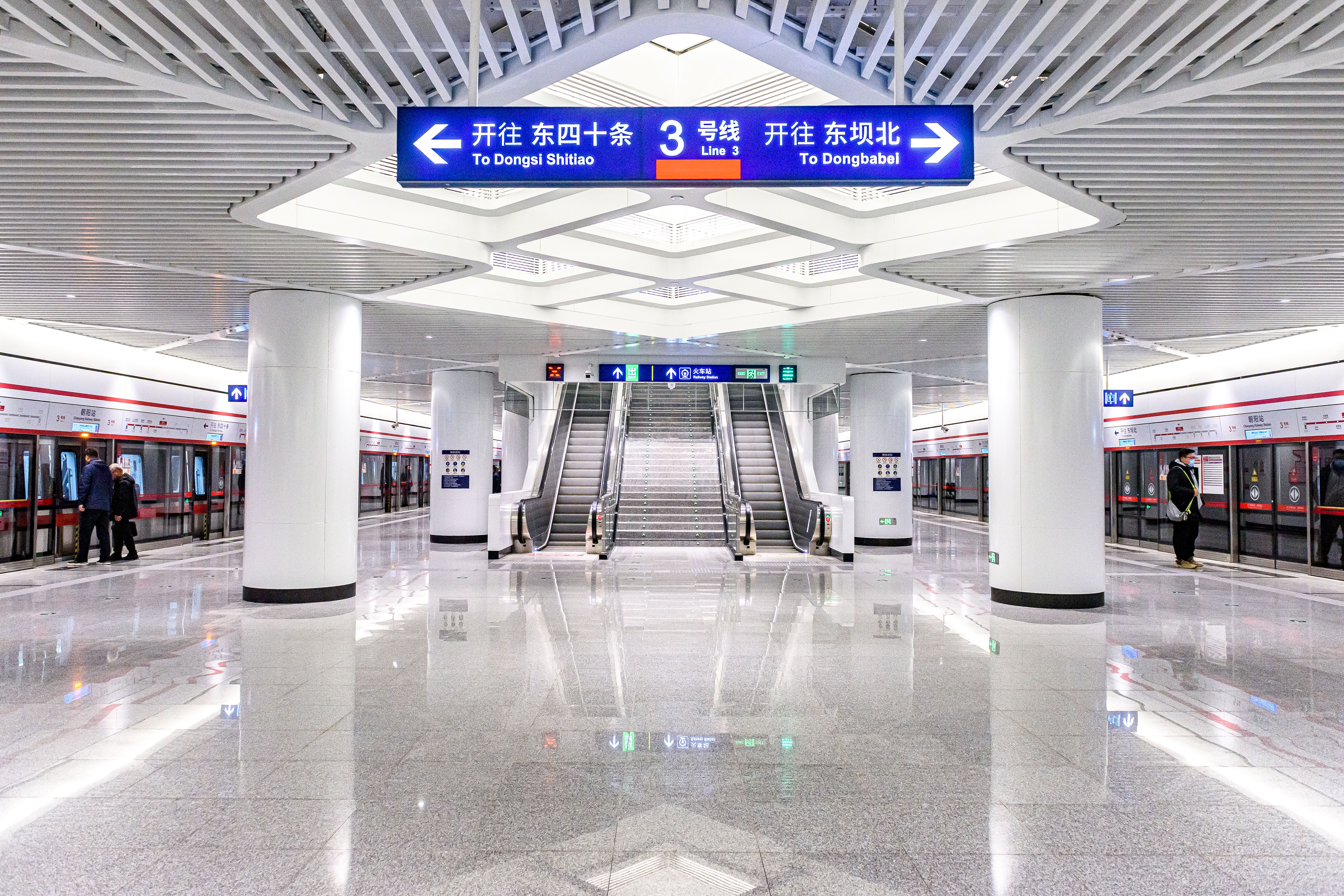
- Subway platform

Chinese name
- Simplified Chinese: 朝阳站
- Traditional Chinese: 朝陽站
Transcriptions
Standard Mandarin
- Hanyu Pinyin: Cháoyáng zhàn

General information
- Location: Underneath Beijing Chaoyang Railway Station West Square, Dongfeng Area; Chaoyang District, Beijing; China
- Coordinates: 39°56′35″N 116°30′01″E
- Operator: Beijing Mass Transit Railway Operation Corporation Limited
- Line: Line 3
- Platforms: 2 (1 island platform)
- Tracks: 2

Construction
- Structure type: Underground
- Accessible: Yes

History
- Opened: December 15, 2024; 22 months ago

Services
Preceding station	Beijing Subway	Following station
Shifoying towards Dongsi Shitiao	Line 3	Yaojiayuan towards Dongbabei
Location
- Location within Beijing

The Line 3 of Beijing Subway began to serve the railway station from 15 December 2024. in long-term planning, Line 20 will also serve this station.

== Exits ==
There are 2 one-way exits to the national railway station at the east of the Chaoyang Railway Station Transport Hub, 1 subway entrance at the west of the hub, and 1 entrance and exit to the online car-hailing pick-up point and the taxi dispatch station on the basement floor at the north of the hub, all of which are not numbered. In addition, there are two independent exits, Exits A and B, on the south side of the station body of Line 3, both of which are located on the southwest side of the national railway station building and the south side of the hub, and there is also Exit C on the north side of the west wall of the concourse.

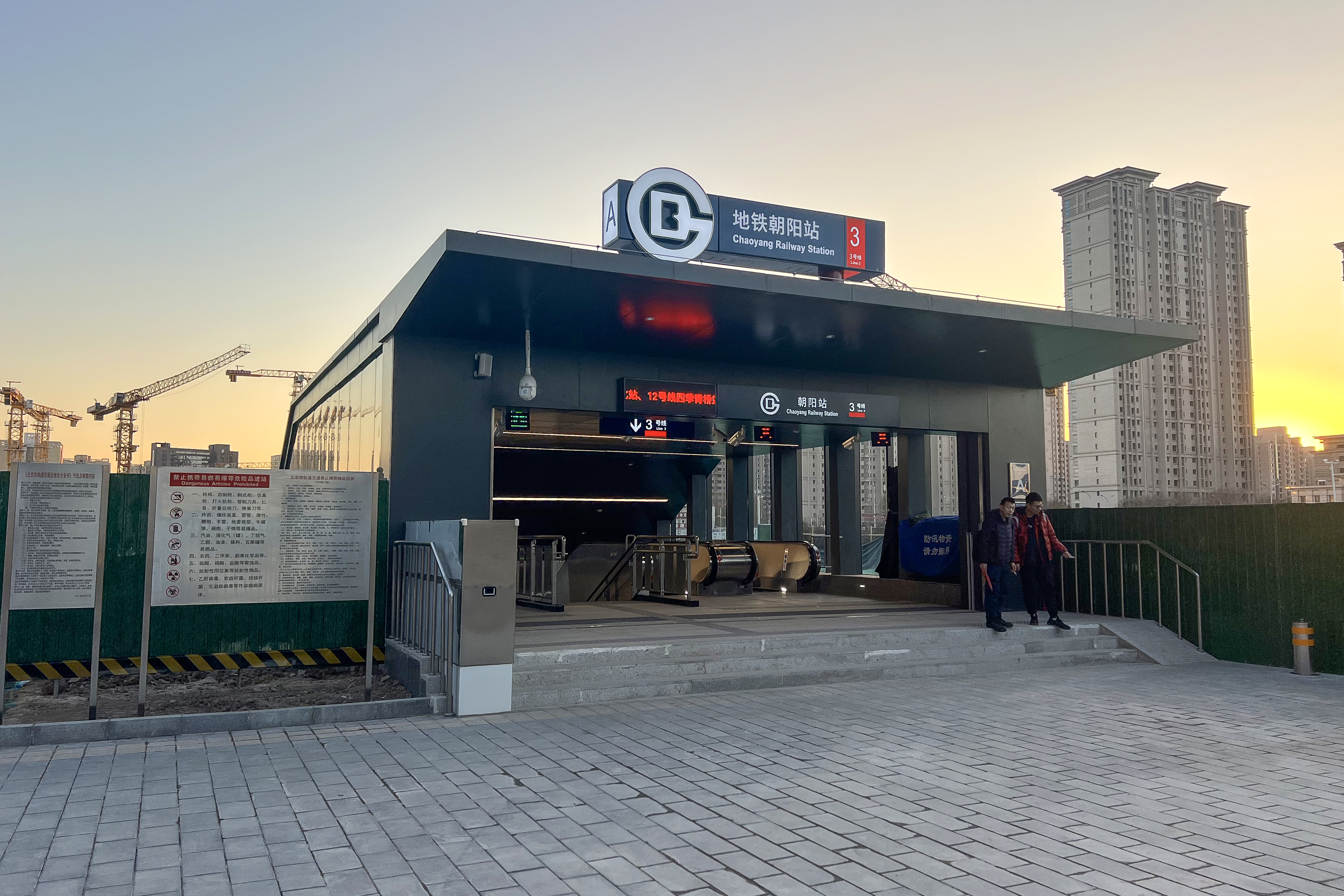
Exit A

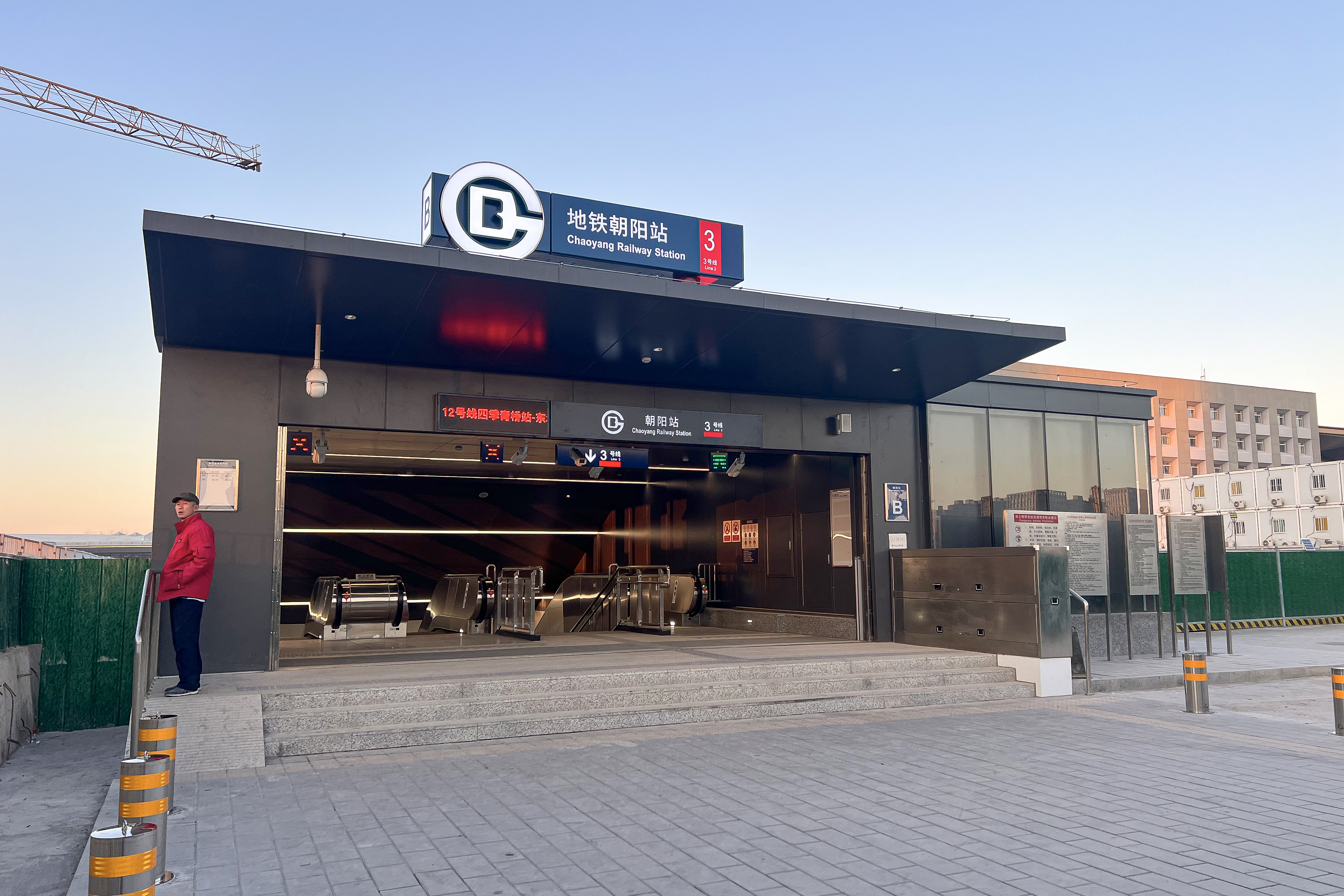
Exit B

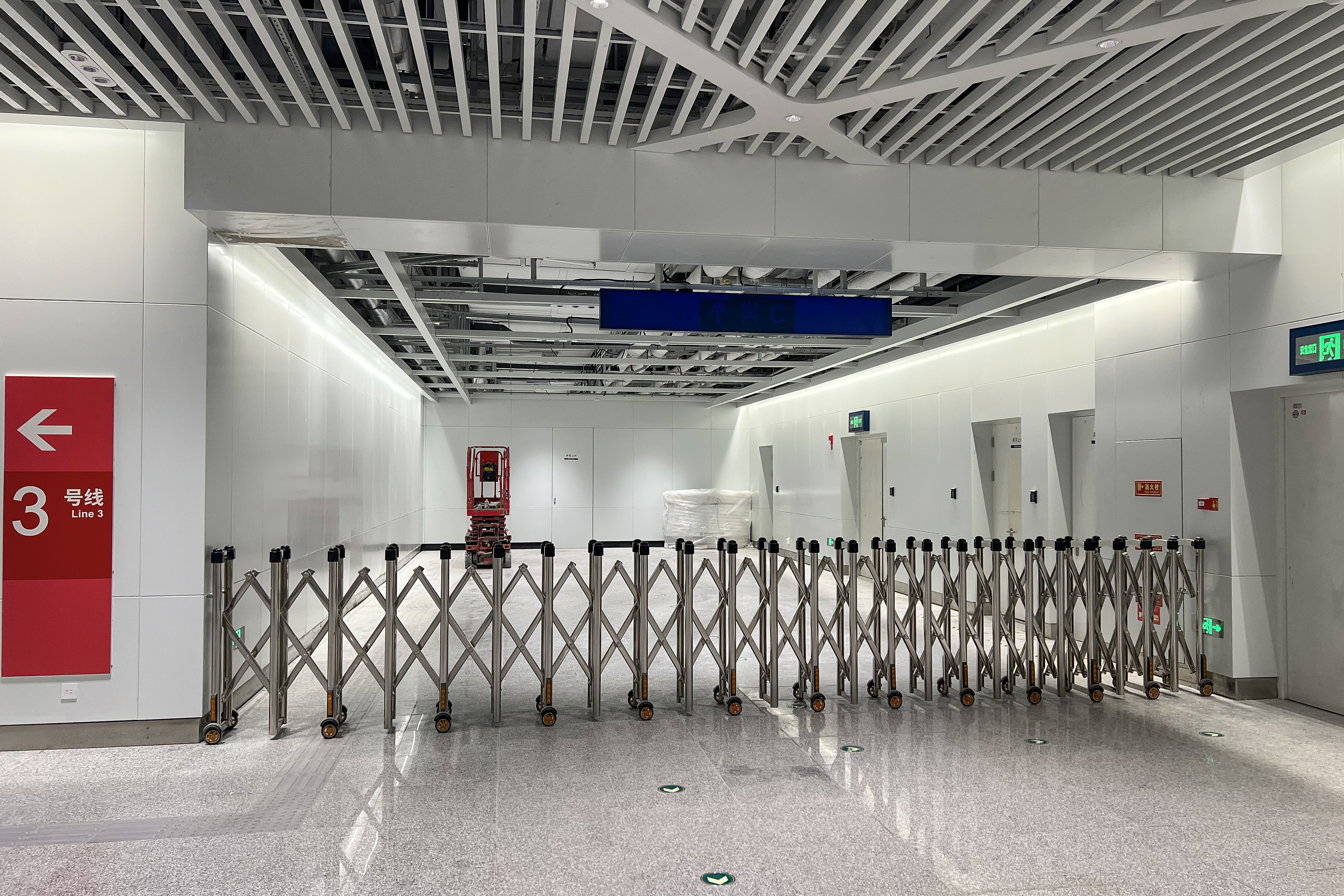
Exit C (reserved interface)

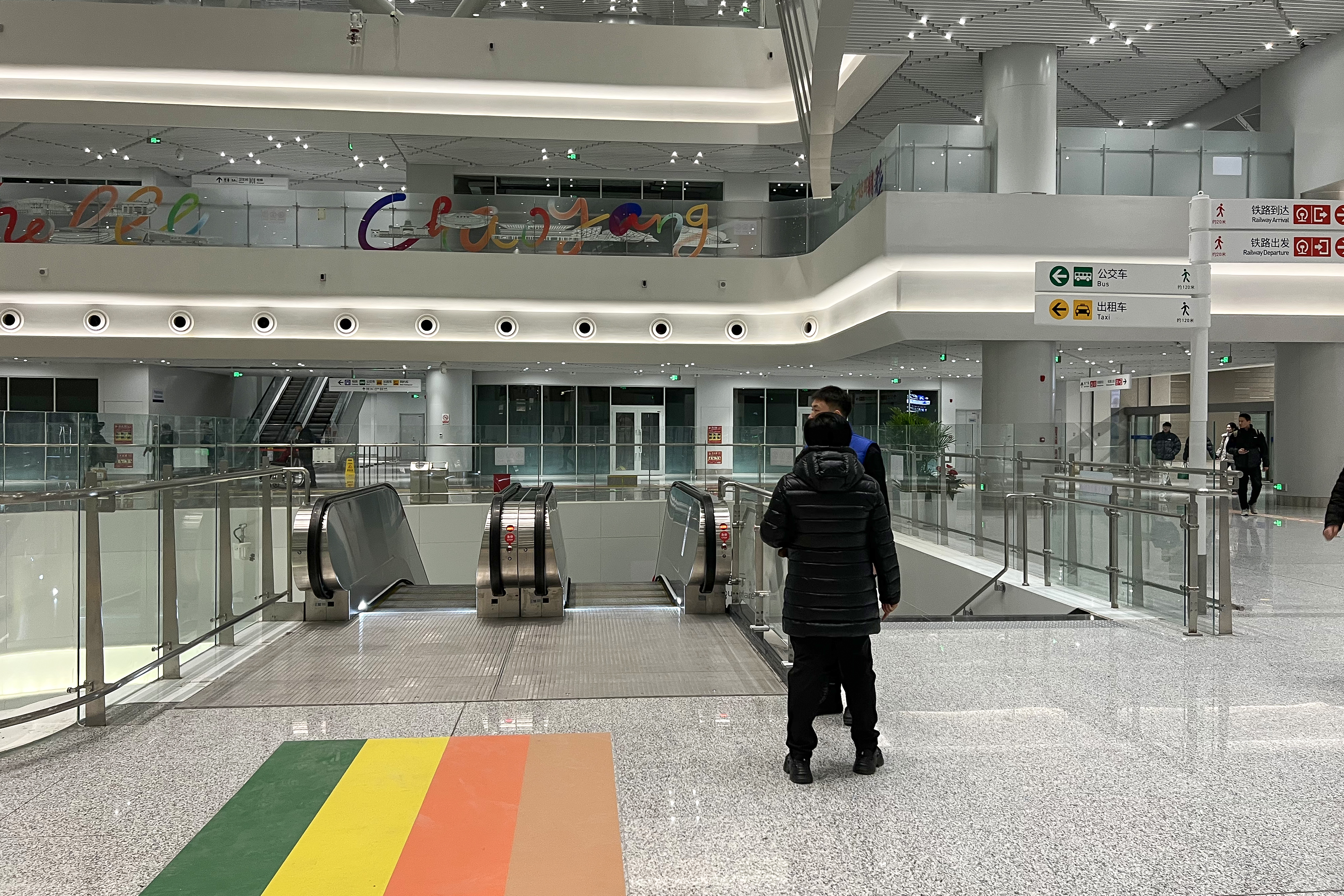
North exit

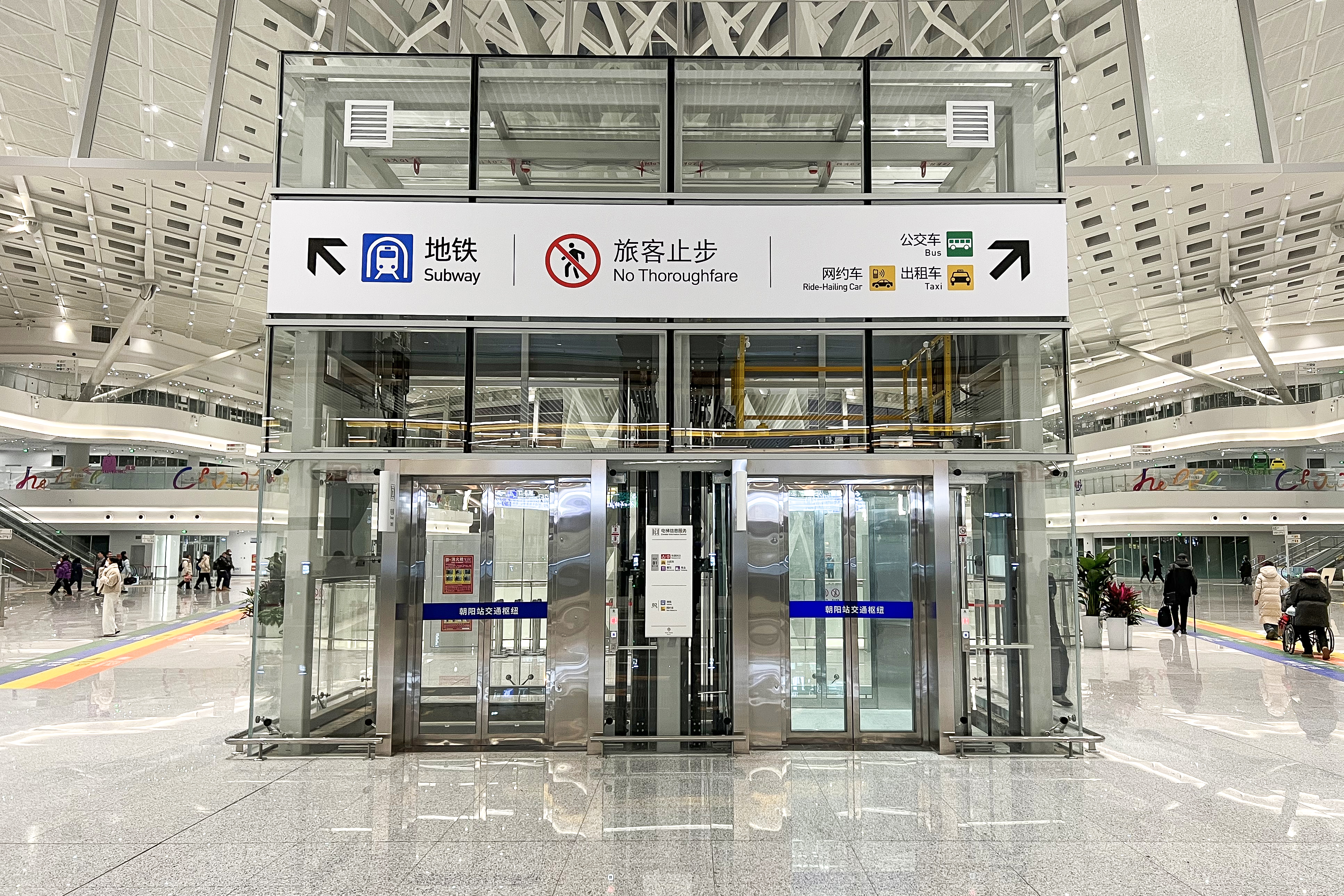
Exit elevators

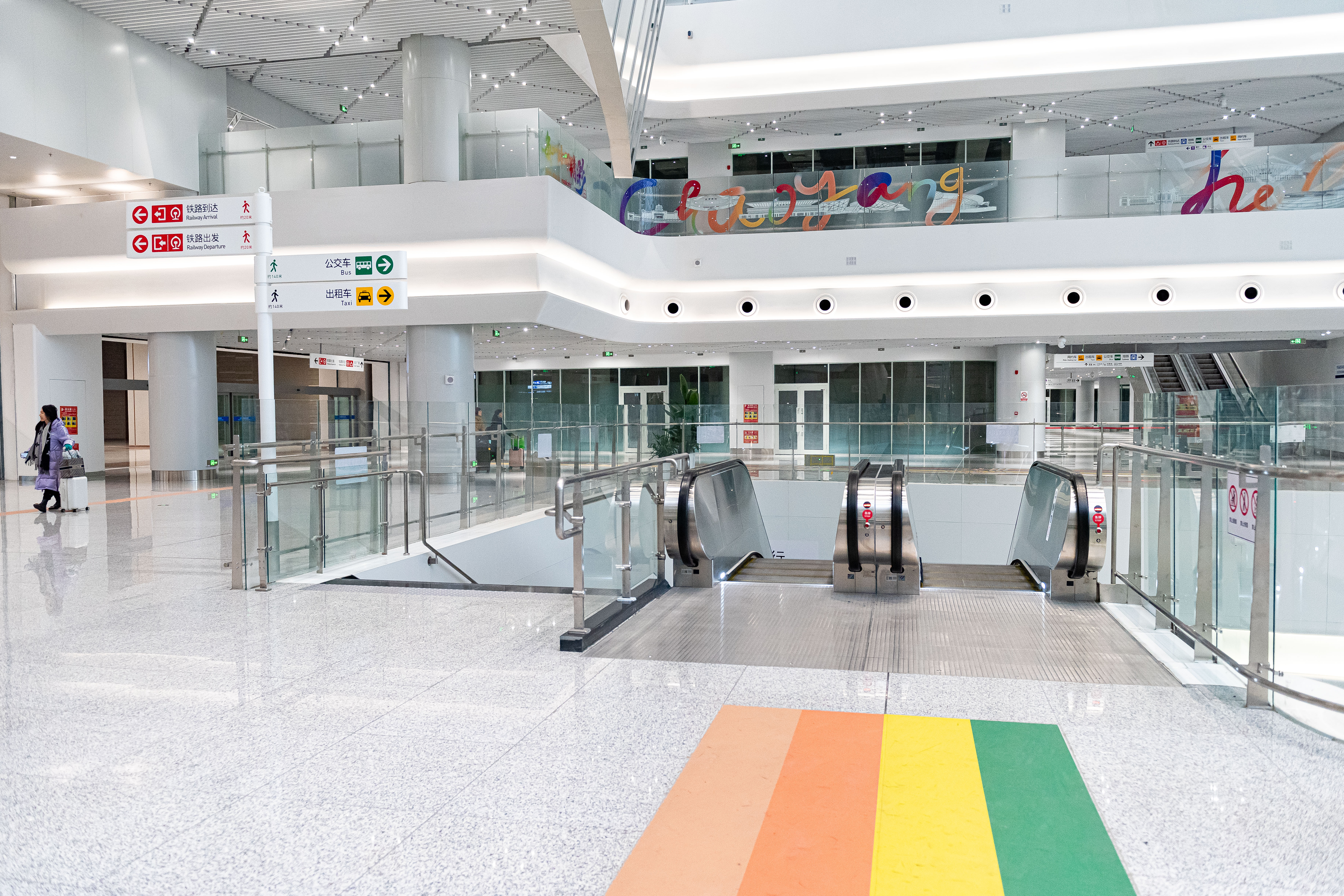
South exit

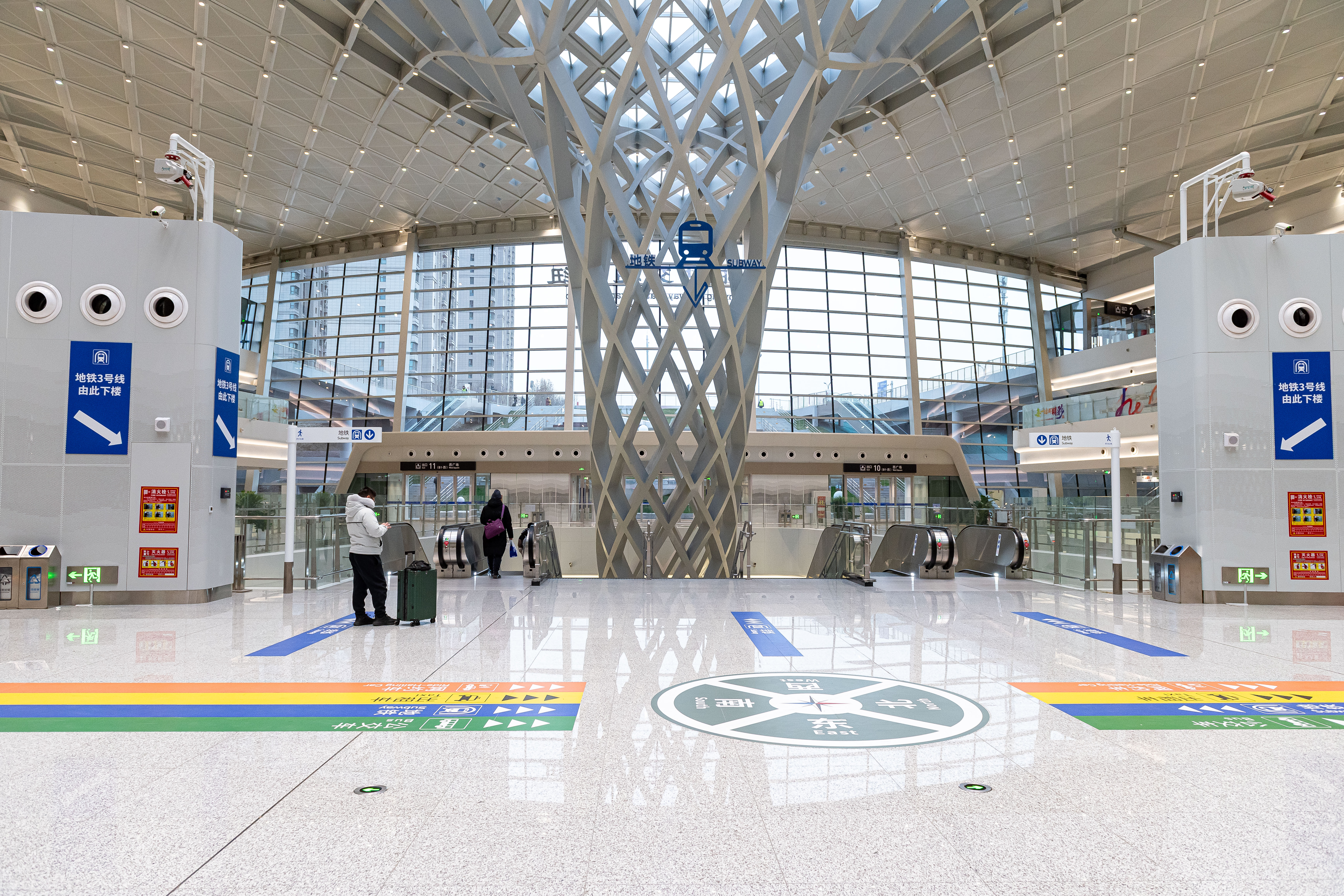
Main entrance

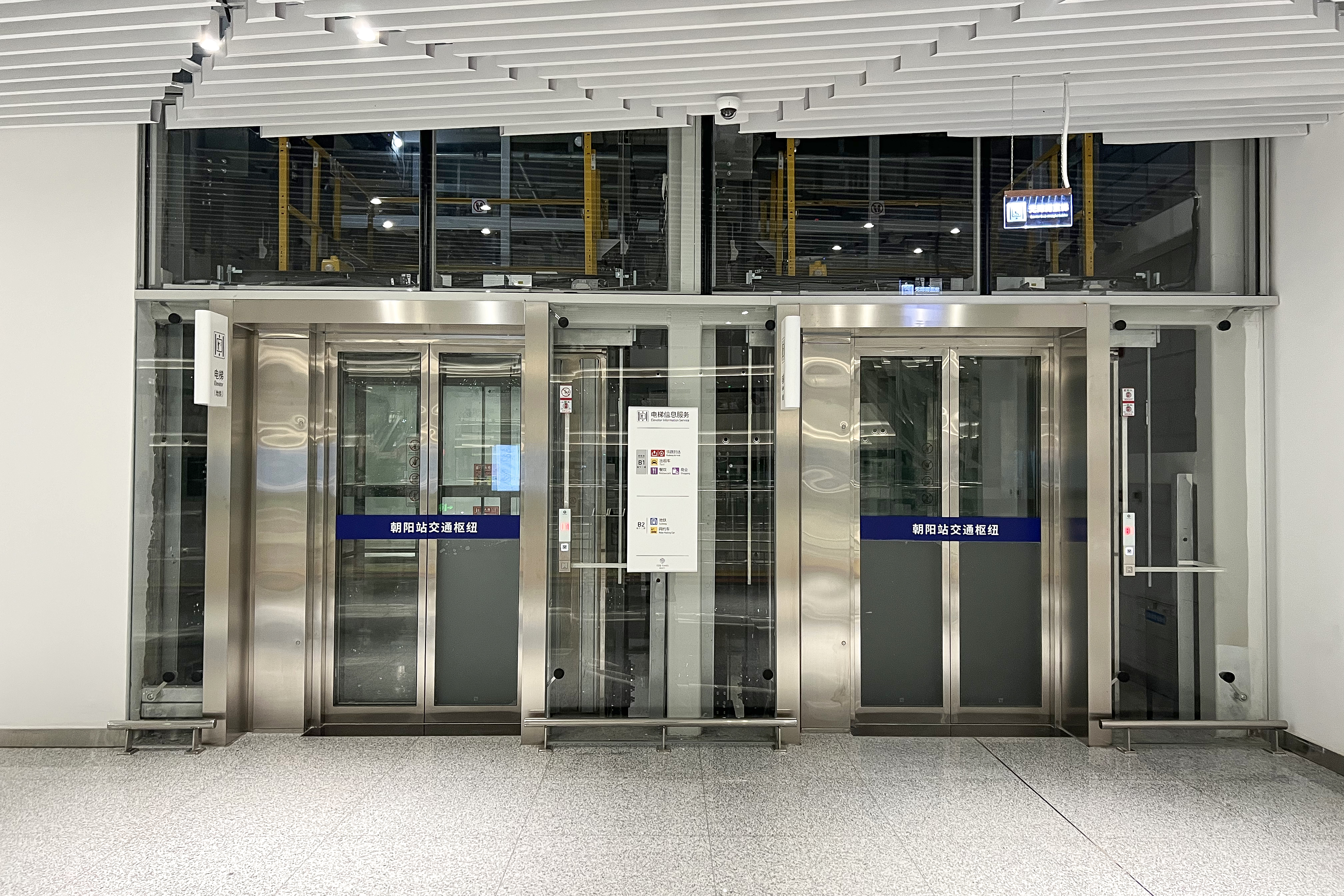
Entrance elevators

== Gallery ==
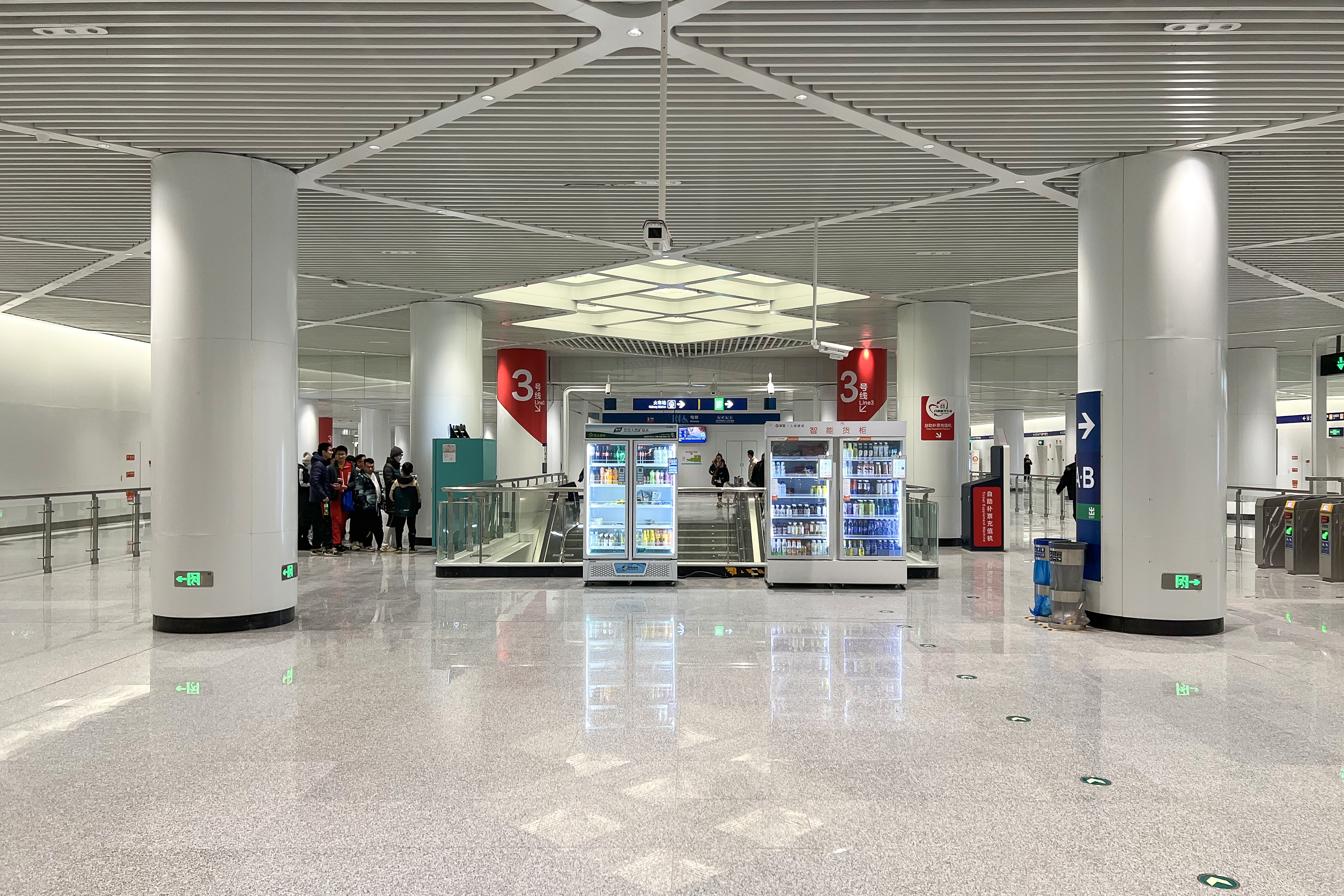
Concourse south section

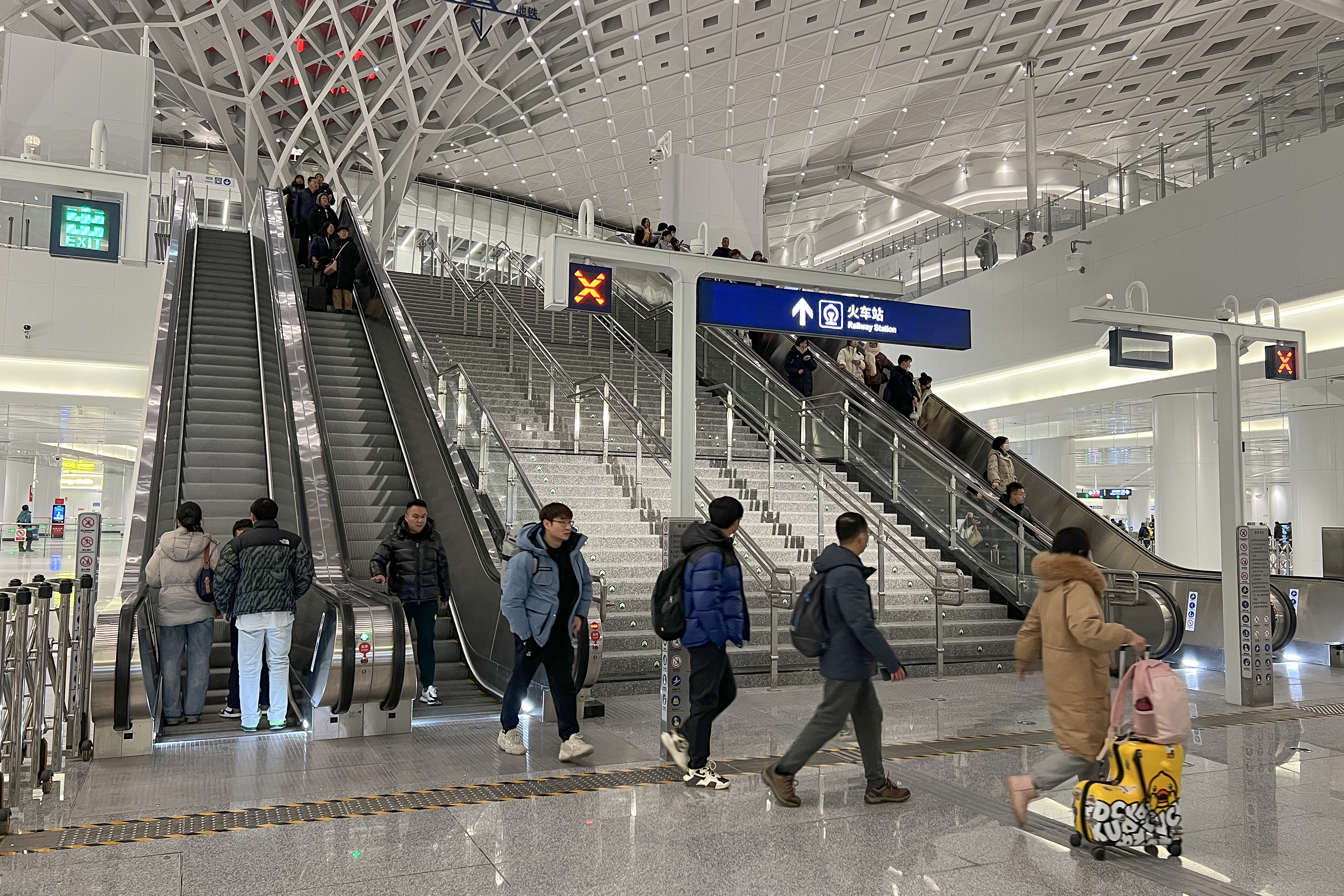
Entrance escalators

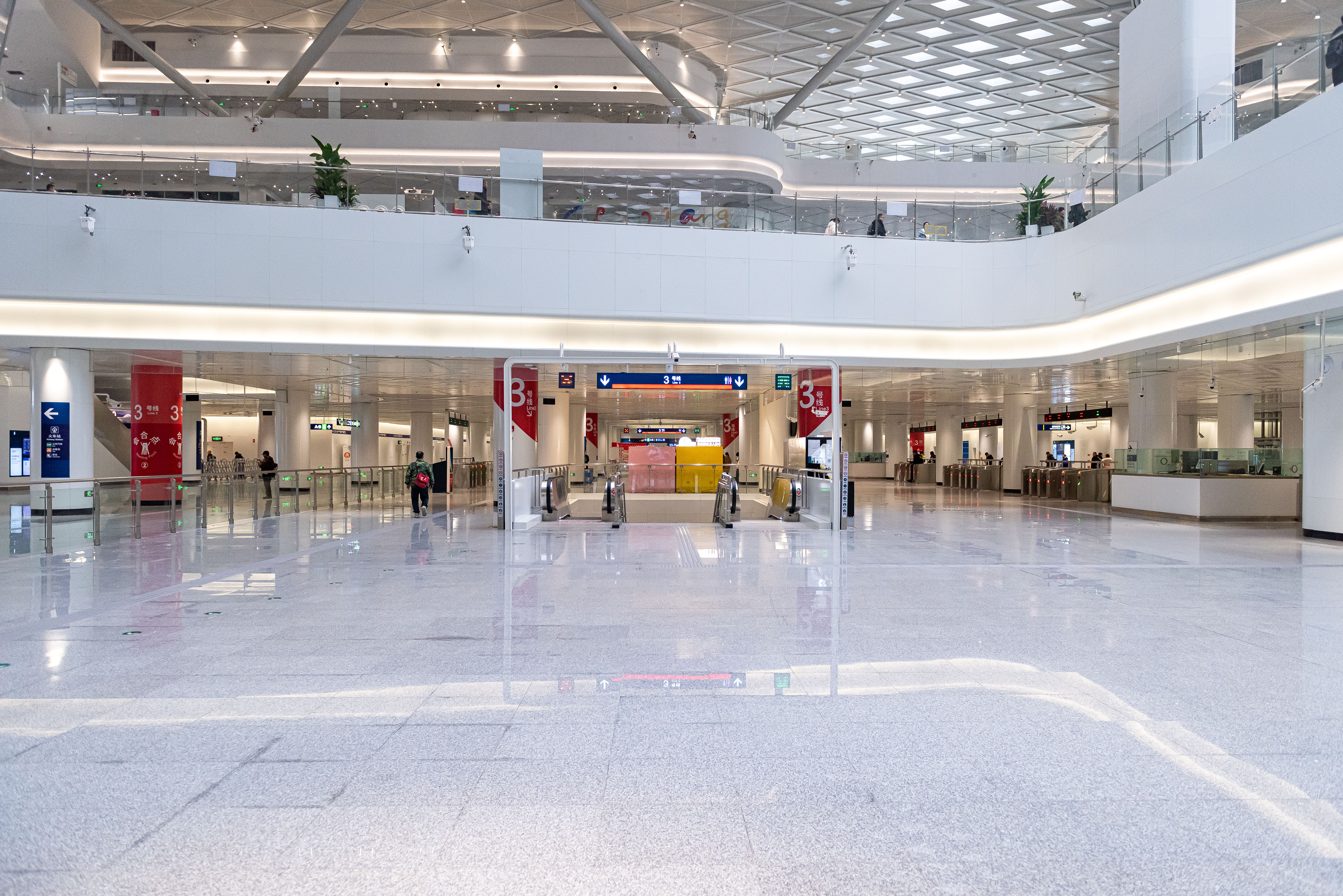
Concourse north section

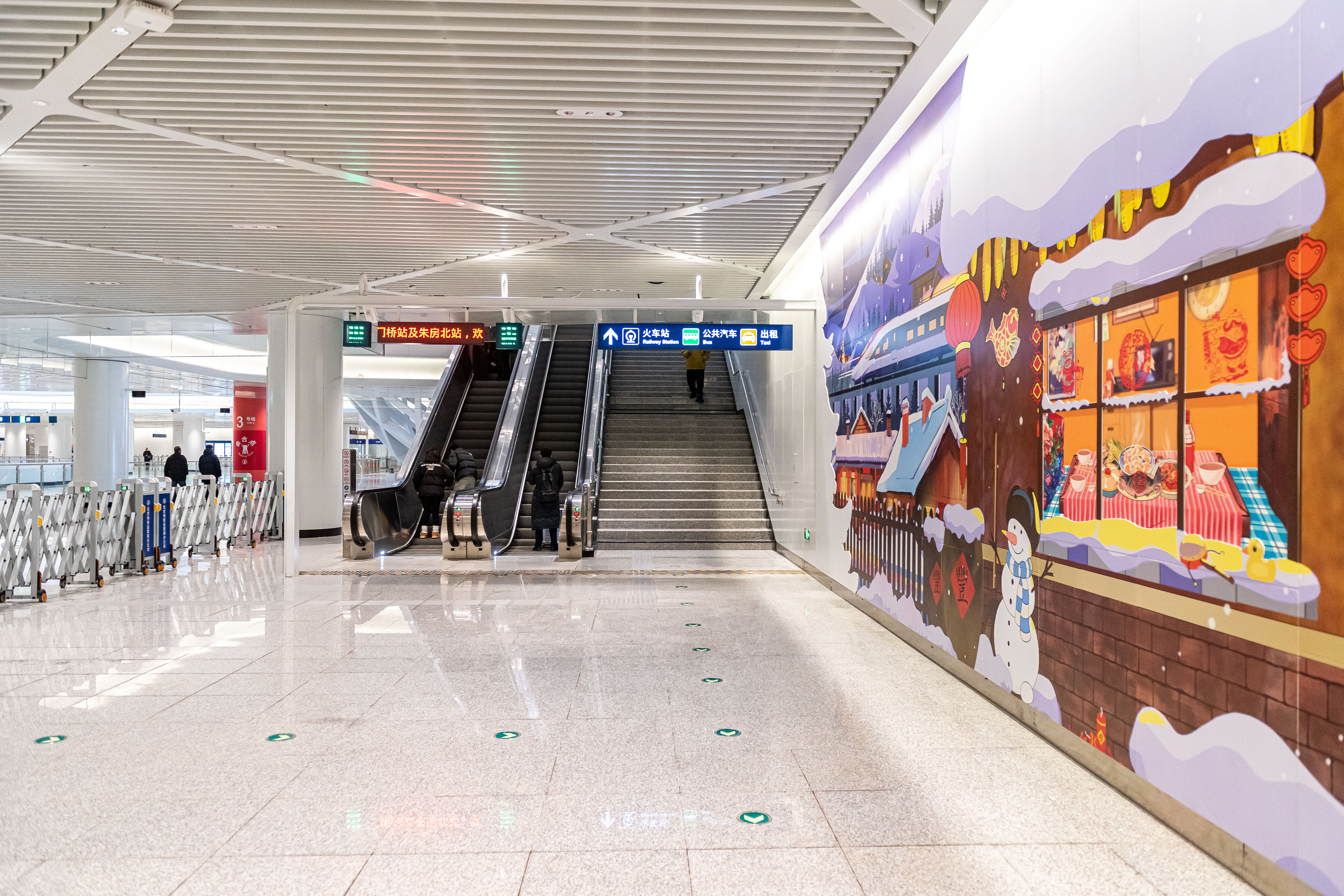
South exit interface towards main railway station

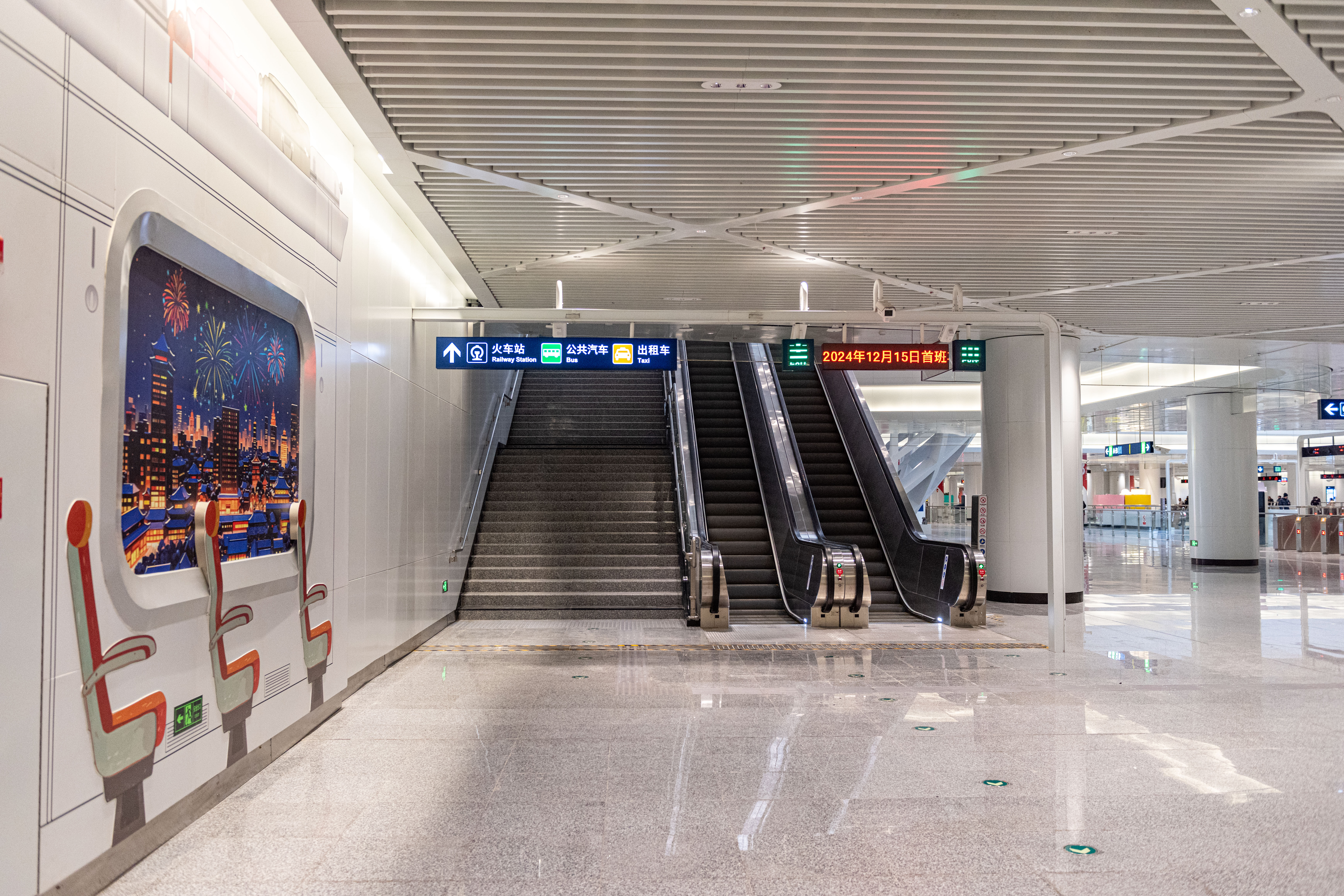
North exit interface towards main railway station

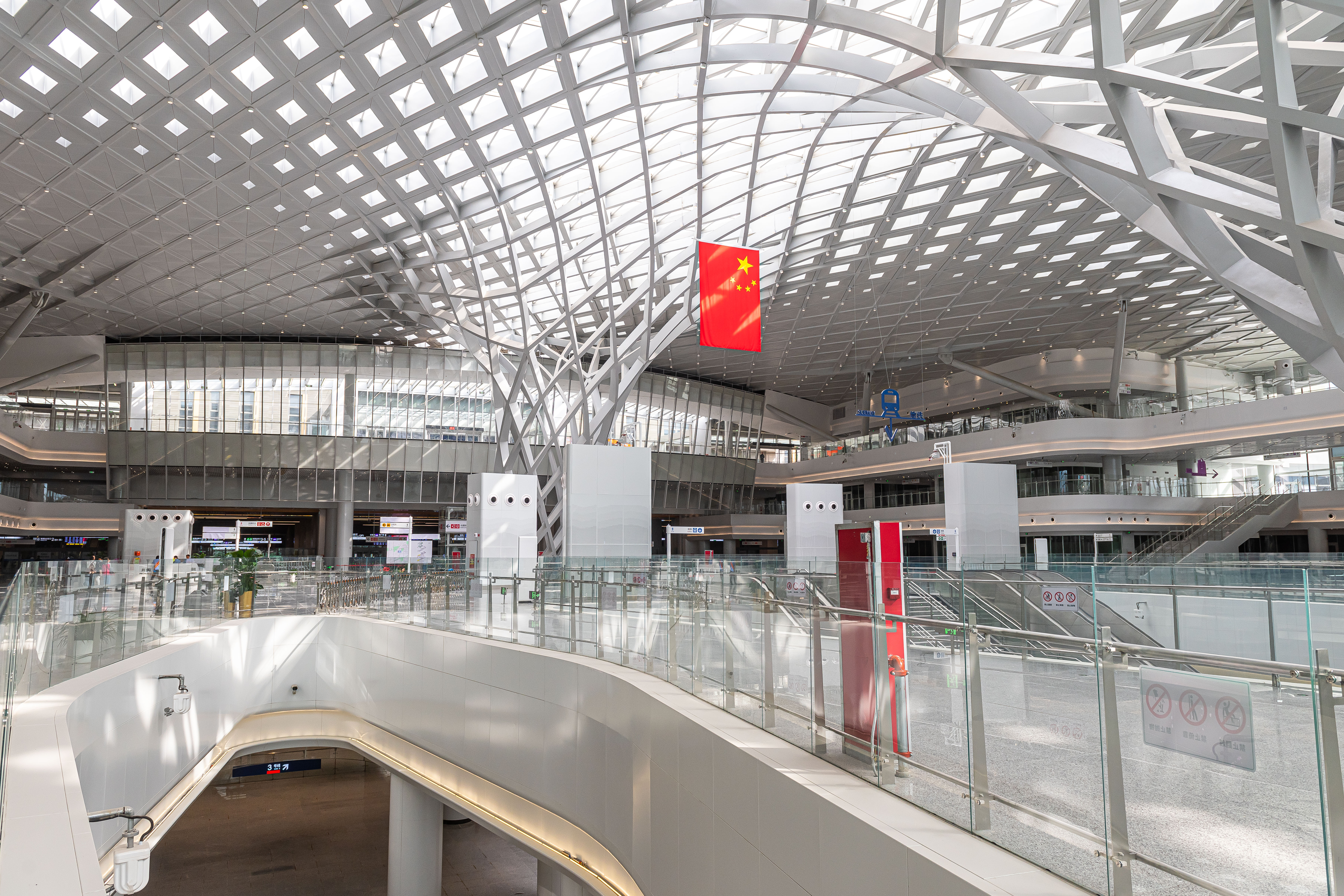
Chaoyang Railway Station Transport Hub basement 1

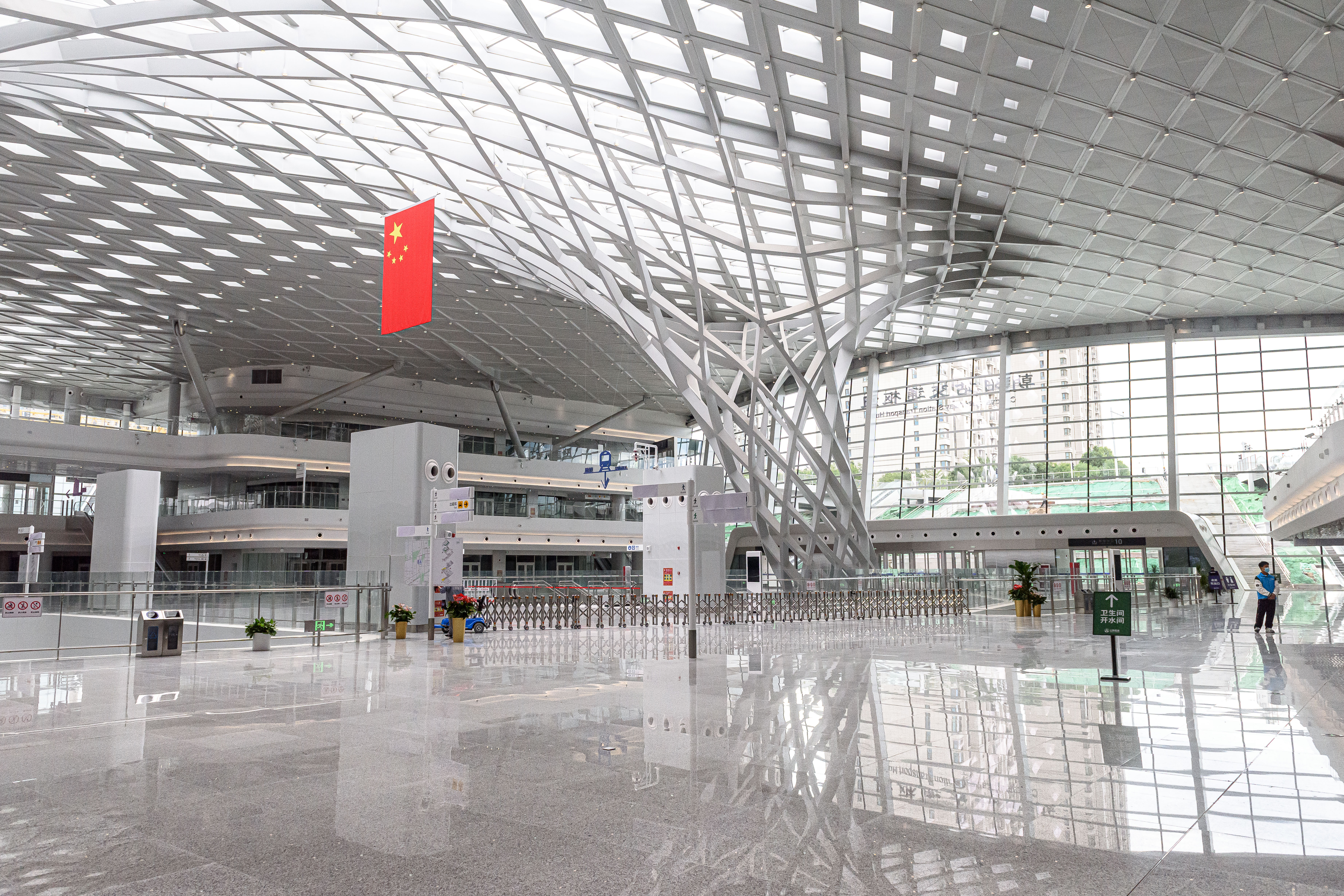
Chaoyang Railway Station Transport Hub basement 1

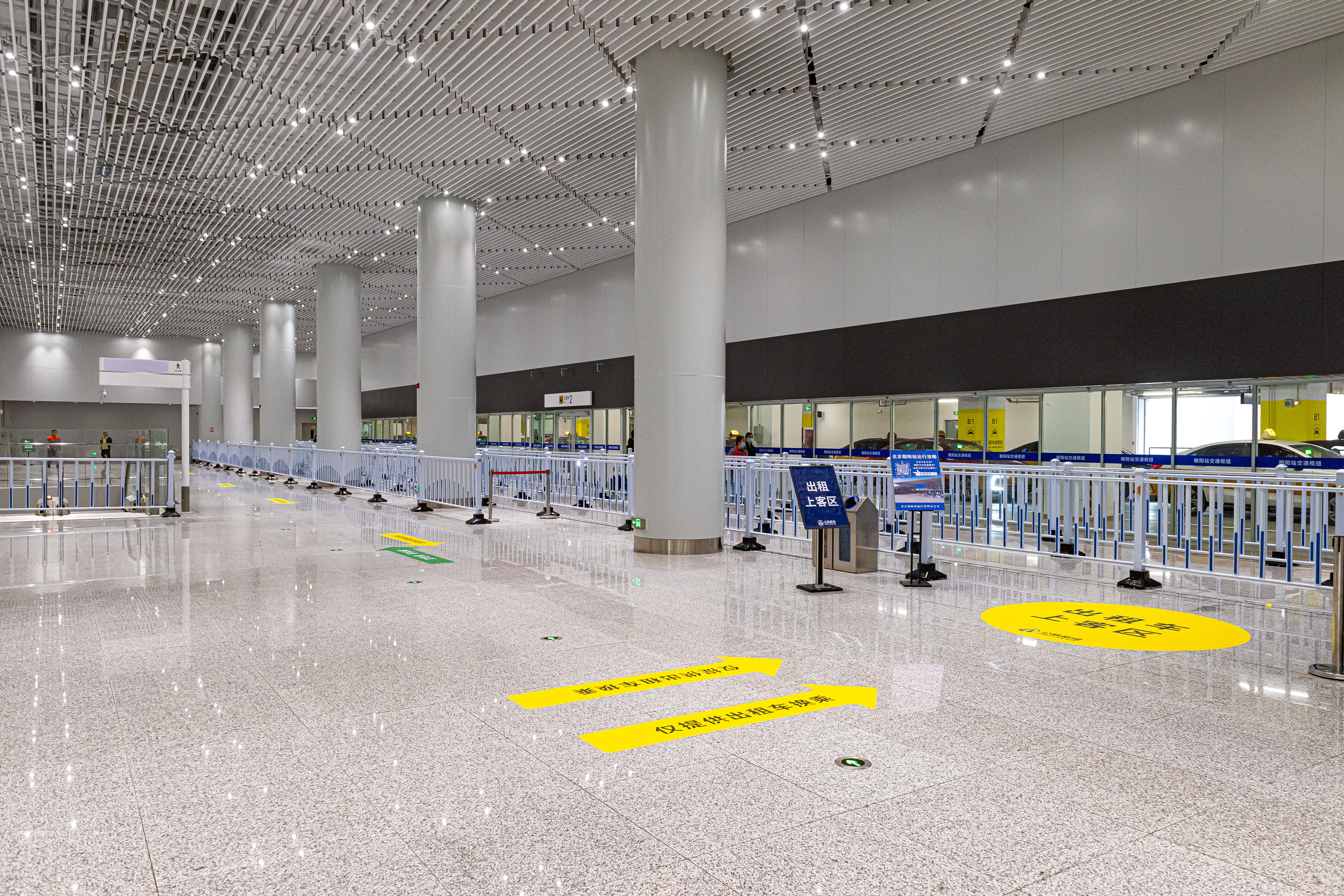
Chaoyang Railway Station Transport Hub taxi stand

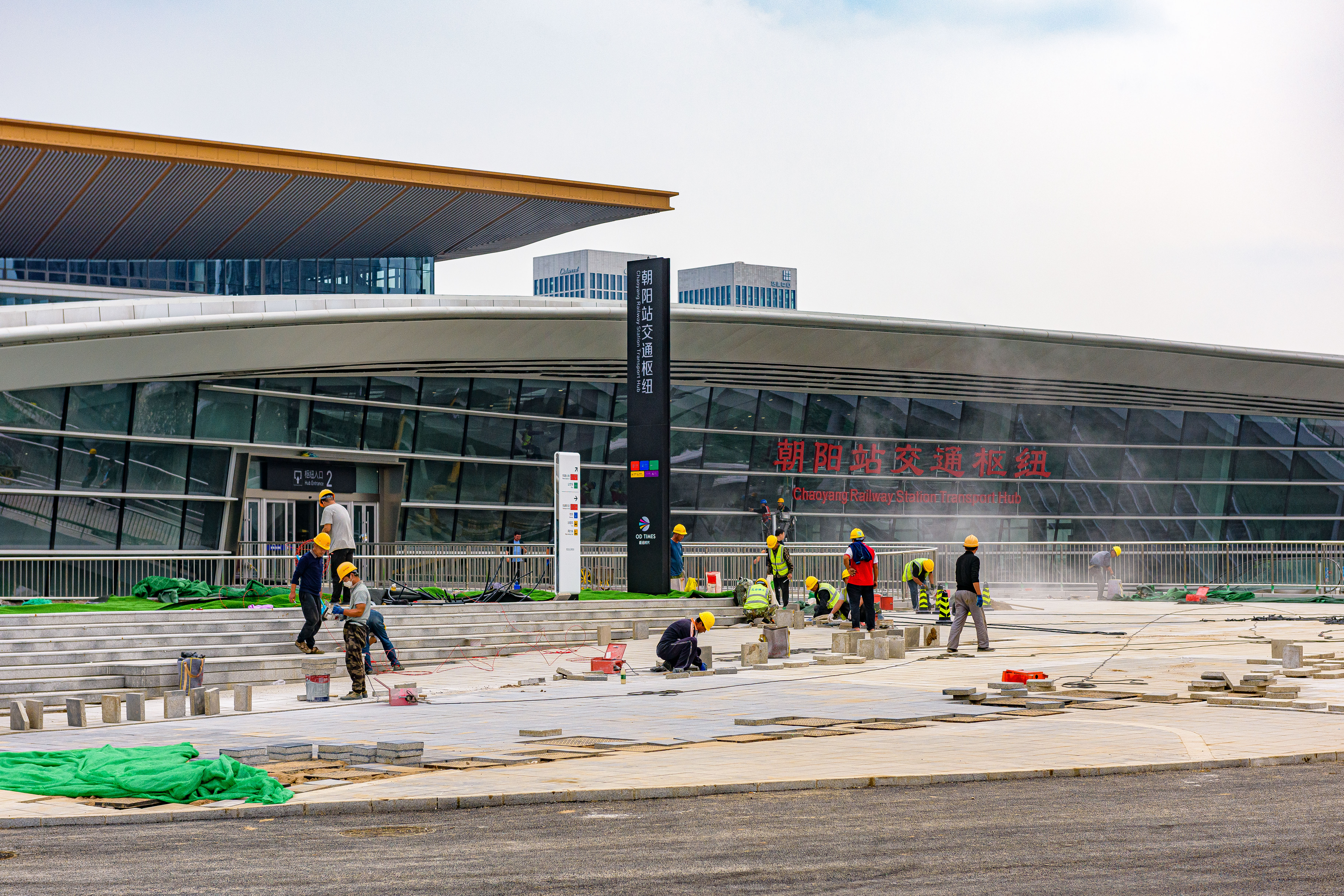
West facade entrance of Chaoyang Railway Station Transport Hub
