= Beijing East railway station =

Railway station in Beijing, China

Beijingdong 北京东
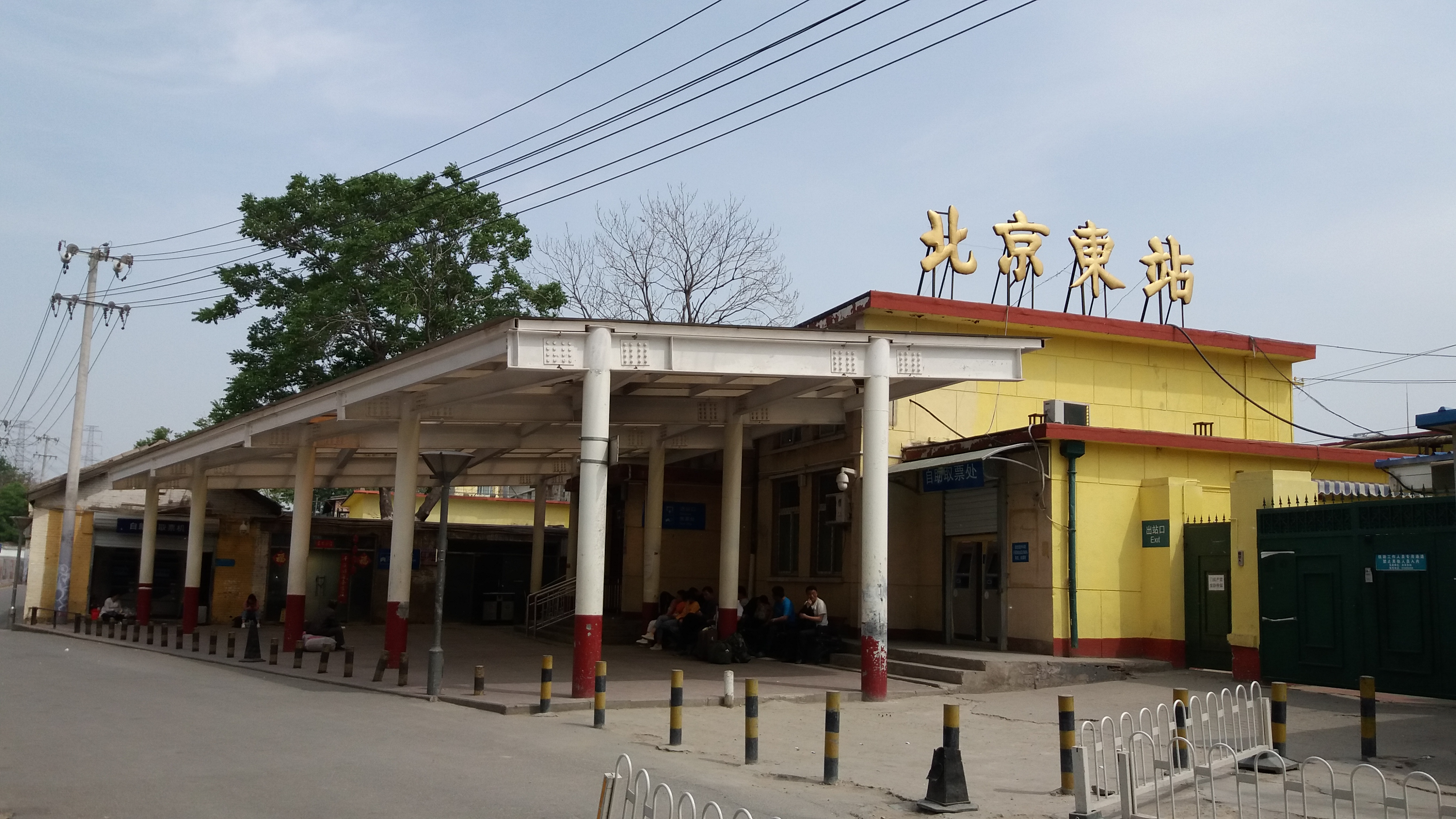

General information
- Other names: Beijingdong
- Location: Shengou Village, Nanmofang, Chaoyang District, Beijing; China
- Coordinates: 39°54′05″N 116°28′43″E
- Operator: China Railway Beijing Group
- Lines: Beijing–Harbin railway Beijing–Baotou railway Beijing–Chengde railway Shuangqiao–Shahe railway Sub-Central line (Beijing Suburban Railway)

Other information
- Station code: 12158 (TMIS code); BOP (telegram code); BJD (pinyin code)
- Classification: 1st class station

History
- Opened: 1938; 88 years ago
- Former names: Dongjiao

Services
Preceding station	China Railway	Following station
Beijing Terminus	Beijing–Harbin railway	Shuangqiao towards Harbin
Beijing towards Beijing North	Beijing–Baotou railway	Beijing Chaoyang towards Baotou
Beijing Terminus	Beijing–Chengde railway	Shuangqiao towards Chengde
Preceding station	Beijing Suburban Railway	Following station
Beijing towards Liangxiang	Sub-Central line	Tongzhou towards Qiaozhuang East
Location
- Location within Beijing

Beijingdong (Beijing East) railway station (simplified Chinese: 北京东站; traditional Chinese: 北京東站; pinyin: Běijīngdōng Zhàn) is a railway station located near Sihui, in Chaoyang District, Beijing. Line 28 of the Beijing Subway is planned to have a station here.

== Schedules ==
A scheduled double-decker passenger train between Chengde and Handan (Y512/513, Y514/511) stops at the station every day.
