= A Single Spark Can Start a Prairie Fire =

1930 quotation from a letter by Mao Zedong

A Single Spark Can Start a Prairie Fire (Chinese: 星星之火，可以燎原; pinyin: Xīngxīng zhī huǒ, kěyǐ liáoyuán) is a letter written by Mao Zedong on 5 January 1930 in reply to Lin Biao, then a commander in the Fourth Red Army, who had expressed doubts about the prospects of the communist revolution. Originally titled "Estimate of the Current Situation and the Question of Red Army Action", it was abridged and renamed after its proverbial phrase when it was included in the Selected Works of Mao, with Lin's name removed at his request. The letter argued that small rural base areas under communist control could grow into a nationwide revolution, and it is regarded in China as an early statement of the strategy of surrounding the cities from the countryside.

== Background ==
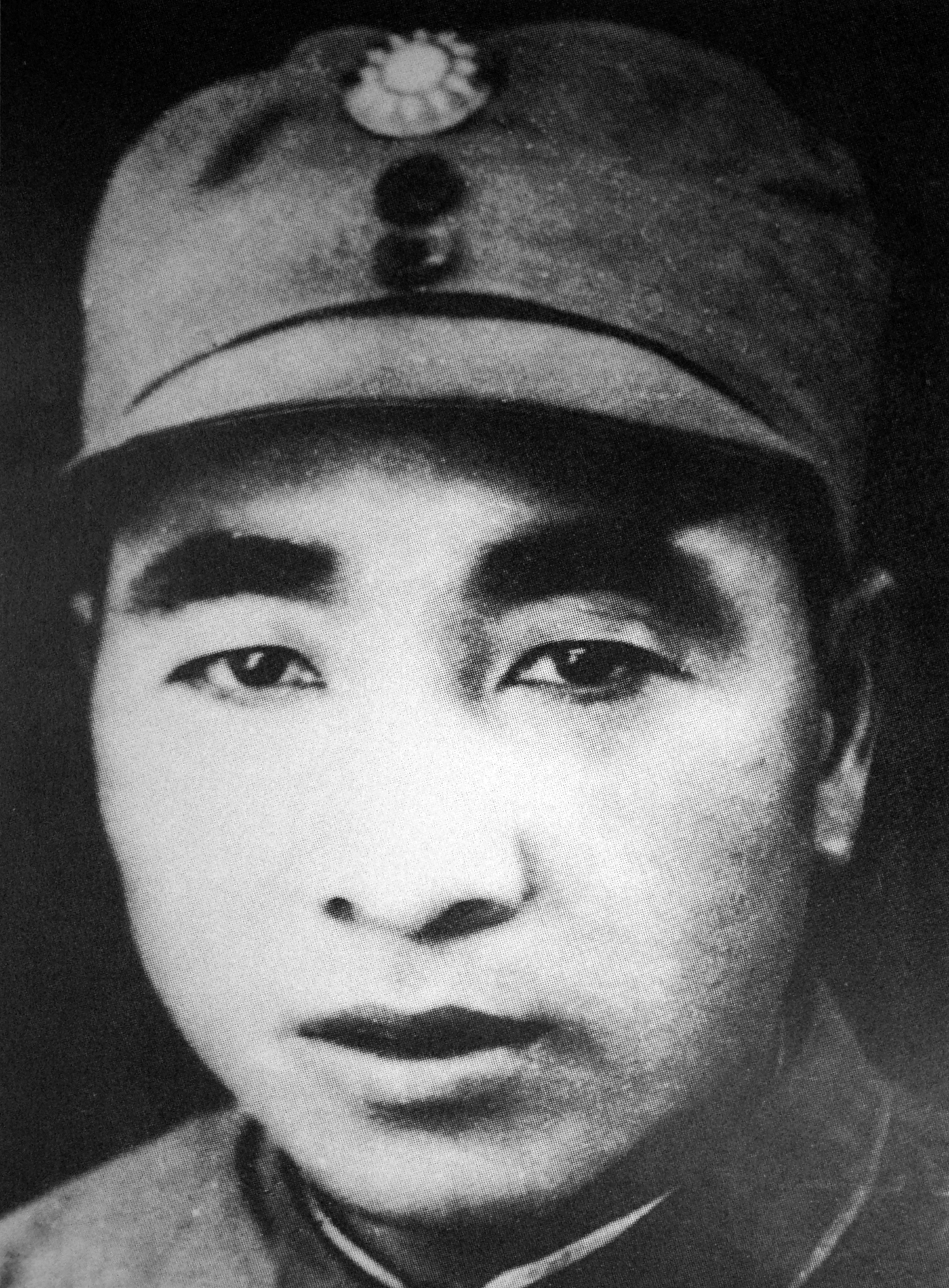
Lin Biao between 1925 and early 1930s

After the failure of the communist uprisings of 1927, surviving communist forces waged guerrilla warfare in remote rural areas along provincial borders, and some within the party asked how long the "red flag" could be kept flying. In February 1929, the party's Central Committee sent a letter to the Front Committee of the Fourth Red Army, which Mao later criticised as giving an overly pessimistic estimate of the situation. In April 1929, the Front Committee, led by Mao, proposed to the Central Committee that the Red Army should aim to win the whole of Jiangxi within a year.

In December 1929, the Fourth Red Army's party congress at Gutian, known as the Gutian Congress, in Shanghang County, Fujian, adopted Mao's resolution on the army's ideology and organisation, and Mao was re-elected secretary of the Front Committee. Around the new year, Lin Biao, then about 22 years old and commander of the First Column of the Fourth Red Army, sent Mao a letter in which he expressed doubt that a revolutionary upsurge could come quickly and opposed the plan to win Jiangxi within a year. Lin circulated his letter to seek views on the Red Army's prospects.

== Origin of the phrase ==
The idea behind the phrase is believed to come from the Book of Documents, which asks whether a fire raging across a plain can still be put out once no one can approach it. The phrase "a single spark can start a prairie fire" was used in the Ming dynasty by the statesman Zhang Juzheng to warn that corrupt officials could stir up popular discontent. Mao introduced it in his letter as an "old Chinese saying", and the letter made the expression widely known in modern China.

== Writing ==
Mao wrote his reply on 5 January 1930 at Xiechengdian, an old residence in Laifang village, Gutian, in present-day Longyan. The letter ran to six or seven thousand characters. It opened by noting that Mao had not yet replied to Lin's letter although it was several days after the new year, and it told Lin that his estimate of the situation was "rather pessimistic". According to the historian Shu Yun, the passages that were later deleted also said that Lin lacked a deep understanding of the need to build political power in the areas where the Red Army fought. The sinologist W. J. F. Jenner described the criticism in the letter as friendly and almost avuncular, and noted that Lin was given command of the Fourth Army a few months later, a promotion that probably required Mao's approval.

== Contents ==
The letter argued that, although the revolutionary forces in China were weak, the forces of reaction were weaker, so that a revolutionary high tide would come in China sooner than in Western Europe. Mao attributed the survival of the small "red" areas to China's position as a semi-colonial country, in which divisions between imperial spheres of influence and a fragmented, backward economy kept the ruling classes fighting one another. He described the Red Army and the red areas as the highest form of peasant struggle and an important factor in accelerating a national revolutionary upsurge. He rejected the idea that the party should first win over the masses across the country and only then stage a national insurrection, and he argued that a policy of "roving guerrilla actions" alone could not accomplish the task of accelerating the revolution.

Mao called for the establishment of base areas, the deepening of agrarian revolution and the gradual expansion of the Red Army and of "red political power". In this context he wrote that "a single spark can start a prairie fire", meaning that the small red areas could grow until they won power across the country. He also discussed the plan to win Jiangxi within a year and conceded that setting a fixed deadline had been a mistake, as it introduced impatience into the expectation of a high tide. The letter closed with three images of the coming revolution, including that of "a ship far out at sea whose mast-head can already be seen from the shore".

== Publication and revisions ==
The full text of the letter was published during the war years. Jenner translated the full text from a supplement to the 1947 edition of Mao's selected works published in the Jin-Cha-Ji (Shanxi–Chahar–Hebei) base area. In February 1948, while the party was preparing an official edition of Mao's writings, Lin wrote to the Central Propaganda Department asking that his name not be made public, and Mao agreed. According to Shu Yun, Lin asked that the first and last paragraphs be deleted and that the notes not name him.

From 1951, editions of Mao's works published in Beijing carried an abridged and partly altered version titled "A Single Spark Can Start a Prairie Fire". The abridgement mainly omitted passages at the beginning and end, and it replaced references to Lin with vague phrases such as "some comrades". The note in the Selected Works described the letter only as a criticism of "certain pessimistic views then existing in the Party". In 1971, New Left Review published Jenner's English translation of the original letter, addressed to "Comrade Lin Piao".

== Lin Biao controversy ==
After Lin's death in the Lin Biao incident of September 1971, the letter was used against him in the campaign to criticise Lin Biao. In 1974, Peking Review published an article describing the letter as a rebuke of Lin's "right-deviationist pessimism", which claimed that Lin had asked how long the red flag could be kept flying and that his pessimism had persisted until he betrayed the party. An earlier Peking Review article of 1972, an abridged translation from the party journal Hongqi, discussed the letter as a criticism of pessimism without naming Lin.

Later Chinese historians questioned whether Lin had ever raised the "red flag" question, since Mao's letter attributed it to "some comrades". Shu Yun argued that Lin's letter had expressed doubt about the speed of the revolutionary upsurge, not about whether the red flag could survive. The general Huang Kecheng, who believed that Lin had raised the question, nevertheless said in 1984, while reviewing the military volumes of the Encyclopedia of China, that Lin should not be judged too harshly for it. Huang also argued that Lin had shown a proper attitude for a Communist by openly stating his views to his superior, even though they were mistaken. The 1989 edition of the Cihai dictionary removed the passage stating that Lin had doubted how long the red flag could last.

In 1968, according to a biography of Lin, Lin revisited the Jinggang Mountains and wrote a ci poem to the tune "Xijiang yue" that alluded to his earlier doubts. Mao reportedly underlined one couplet of the poem, added a question mark and remarked that it was a historical case that should not be reopened.

== Legacy ==
Official Chinese accounts present the letter as a statement of the path of building rural base areas, surrounding the cities from the countryside and seizing power by armed force, and as having pointed to the bright prospects of the Chinese revolution. In 1960, students exiled to Tianshui in Gansu during the Great Chinese Famine named their underground magazine Spark (Xinghuo) after the phrase, and the magazine, which criticised the party and the cult of personality around Mao, was suppressed within months. The magazine features in the journalist Ian Johnson's 2023 book Sparks, about China's underground historians. During the 2022 COVID-19 protests in China, the Hong Kong-founded outlet Initium Media used the phrase to suggest that the scattered protests could grow into a larger movement.
