= Wangjing railway station =

Railway station in Beijing, China

Coordinates: 40.0214°N 116.4708°E

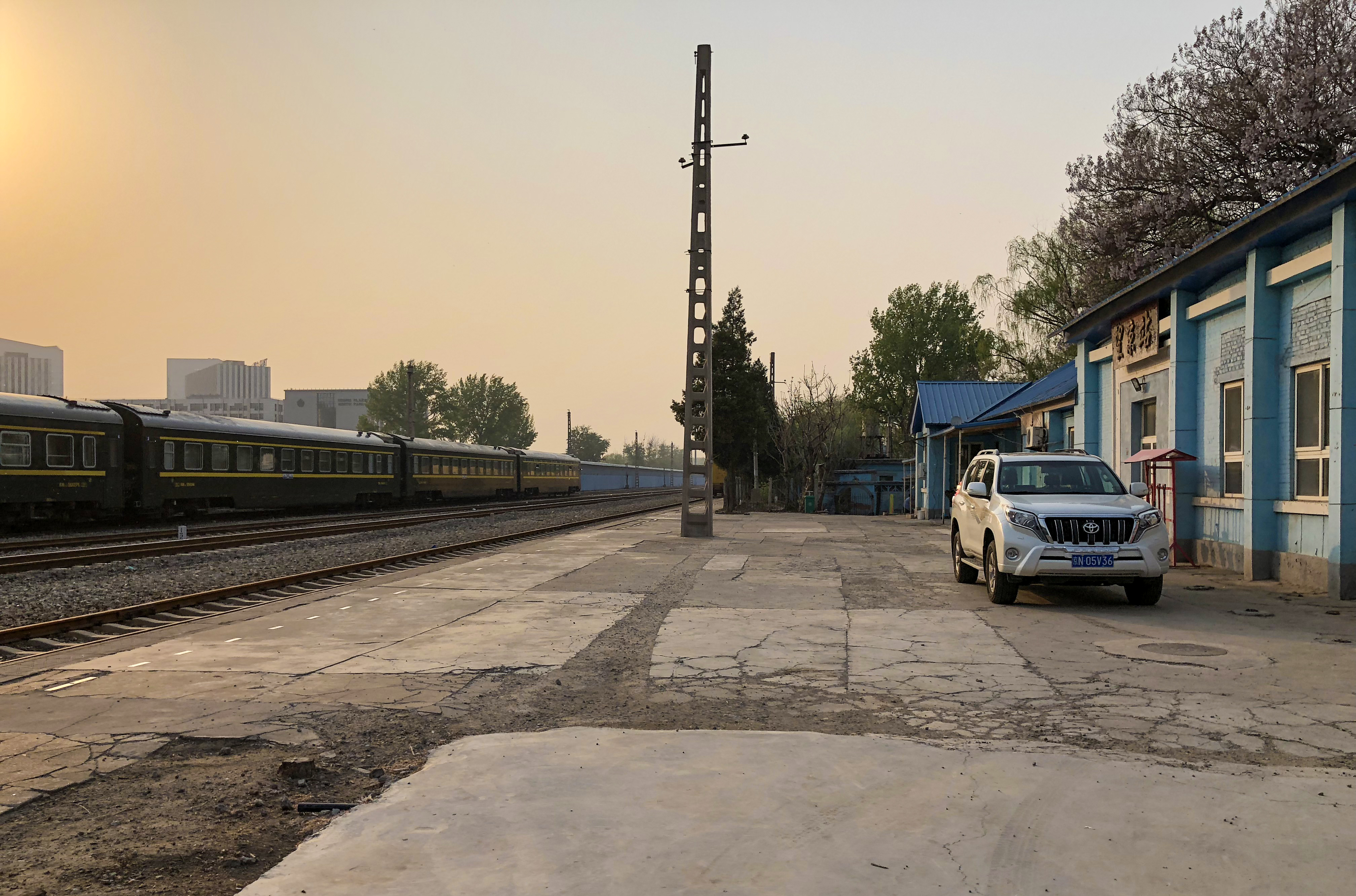
Wangjing Railway Station

Wangjing railway station (Chinese: 望京站; pinyin: wàngjīng zhàn) is a railway station in Chaoyang District, Beijing. It is on the Jingbao railway line and was also served by the former Wanghe railway.

| Preceding station | China Railway | Following station |
|---|---|---|
| Beijing Chaoyang towards Beijing North | Beijing–Baotou railway | Huangtudian towards Baotou |
