= Tiancun station =

Beijing Subway station

Tiancun 田村
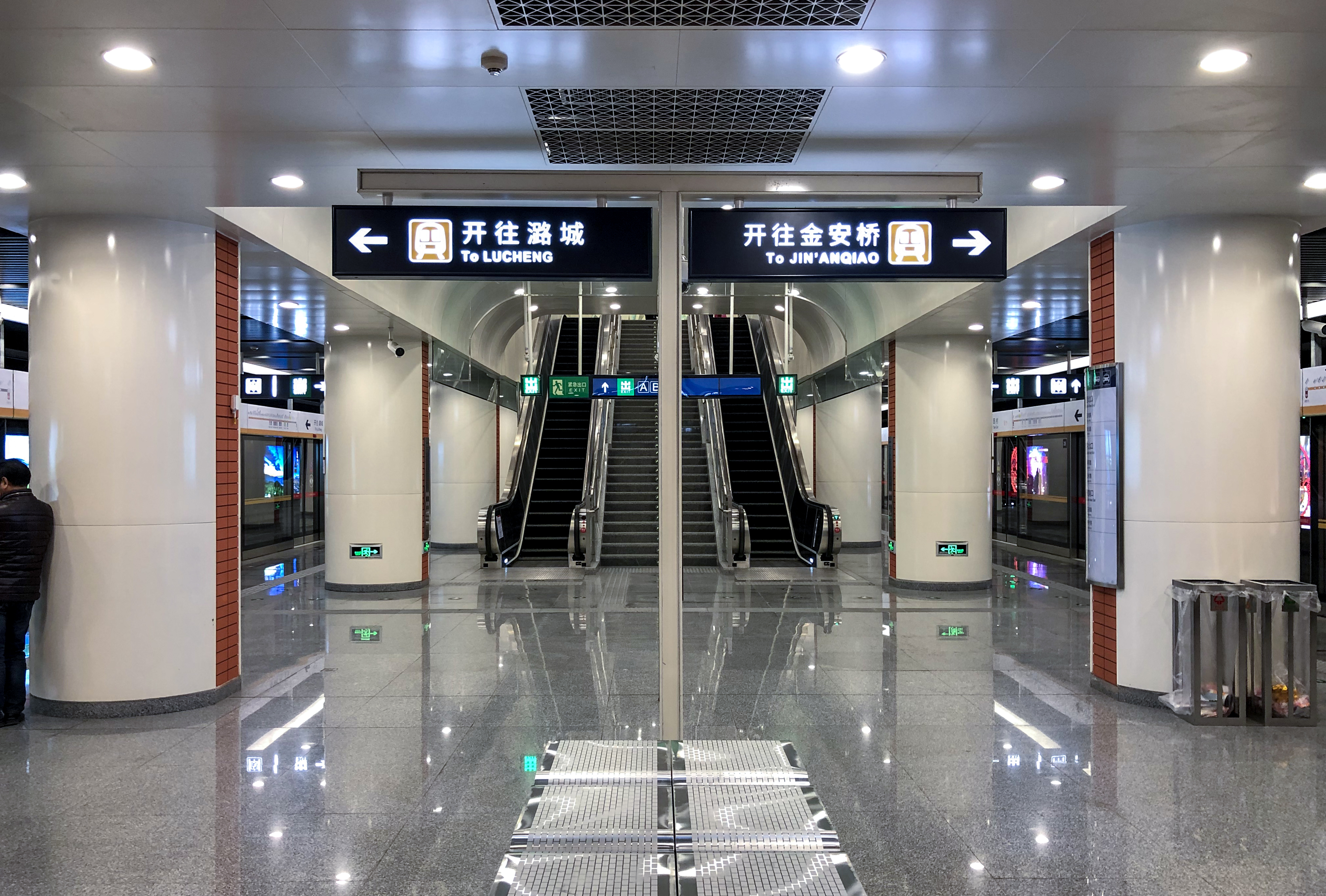
- Platform

General information
- Location: Intersection of Tiancun Rd. (田村路) and Hanhe Rd. (旱河路); Tiancunlu Subdistrict, Haidian District, Beijing; China
- Coordinates: 39.928138°N 116.246833°E
- Operator: Beijing Mass Transit Railway Operation Corporation Limited
- Line: Line 6
- Platforms: 2 (1 island platform)
- Tracks: 2

Construction
- Structure type: Underground
- Accessible: Yes

History
- Opened: December 30, 2018; 7 years ago

Services
| Preceding station | Beijing Subway | Following station |
|---|---|---|
| Liaogongzhuang towards Jin'anqiao | Line 6 | Haidian Wuluju towards Luyang |
Location
- Location within Beijing

Tiancun station (Chinese: 田村站; pinyin: Tián Cūn zhàn) is a station on Line 6 of the Beijing Subway. It was opened on December 30, 2018.

== Station layout ==
The station has an underground island platform.

== Exits ==
There are 3 exits, lettered A, B, and D. Exit D is accessible.

== Future plan ==
The station will eventually connect with Line 3 In the second phase of the line.

== Gallery ==
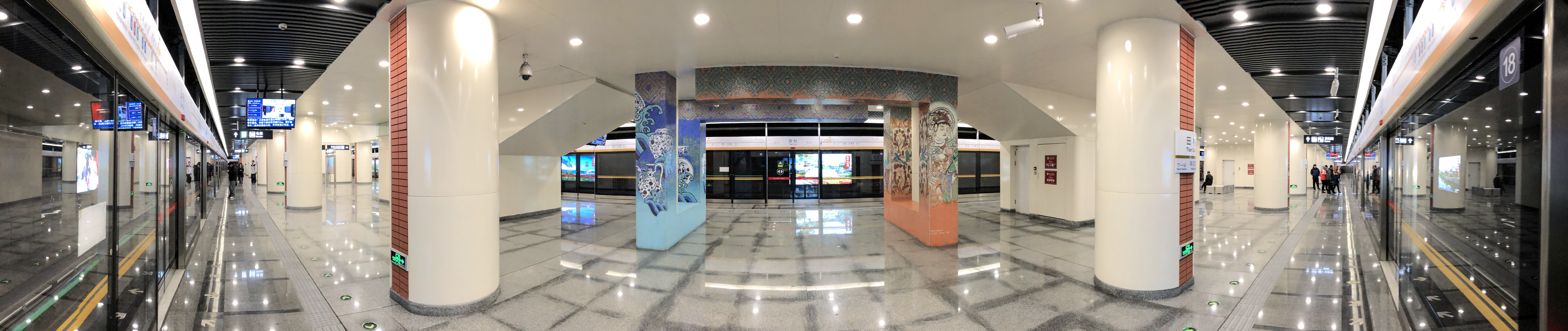
Platform panorama of Tian Cun Station
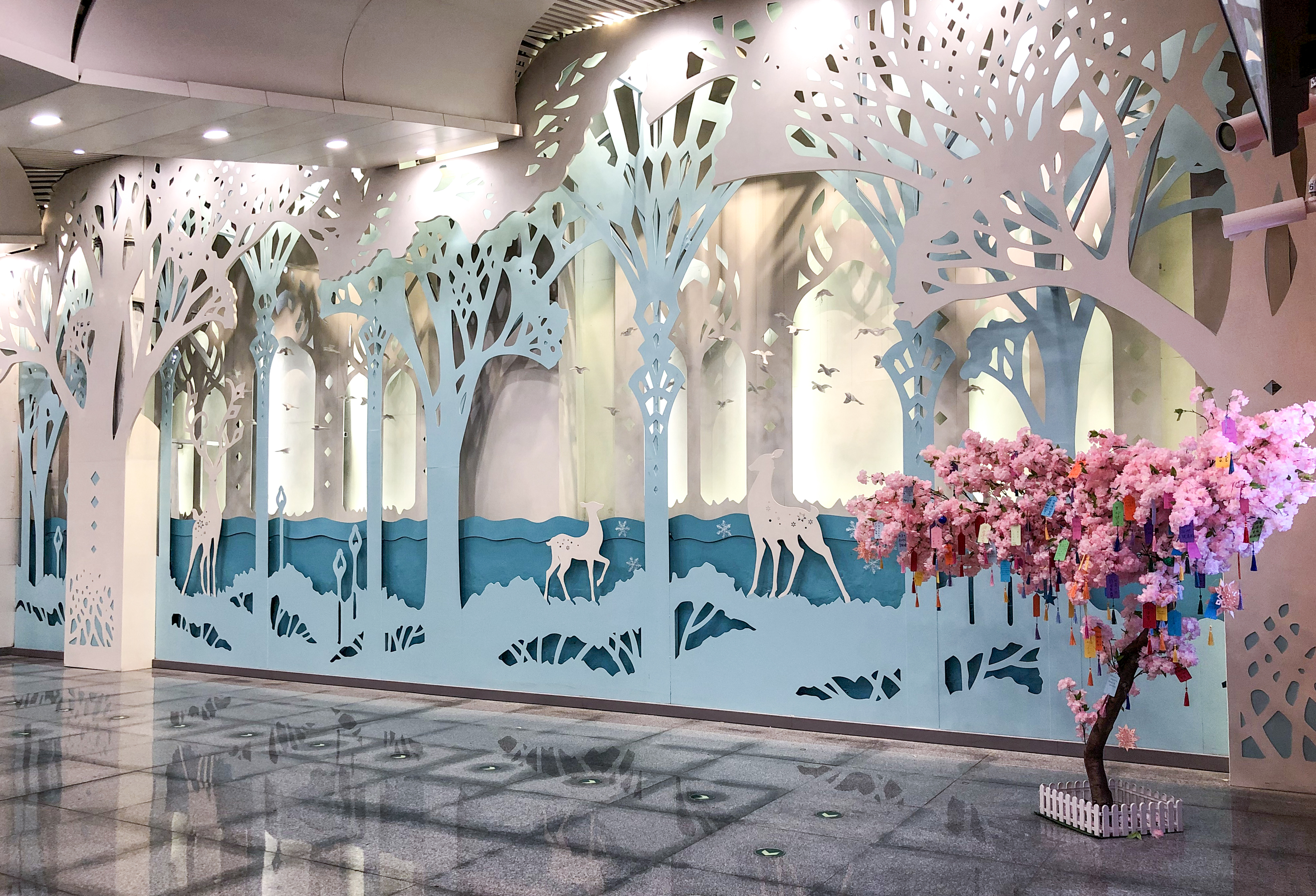
Eastern art wall of Tian Cun station

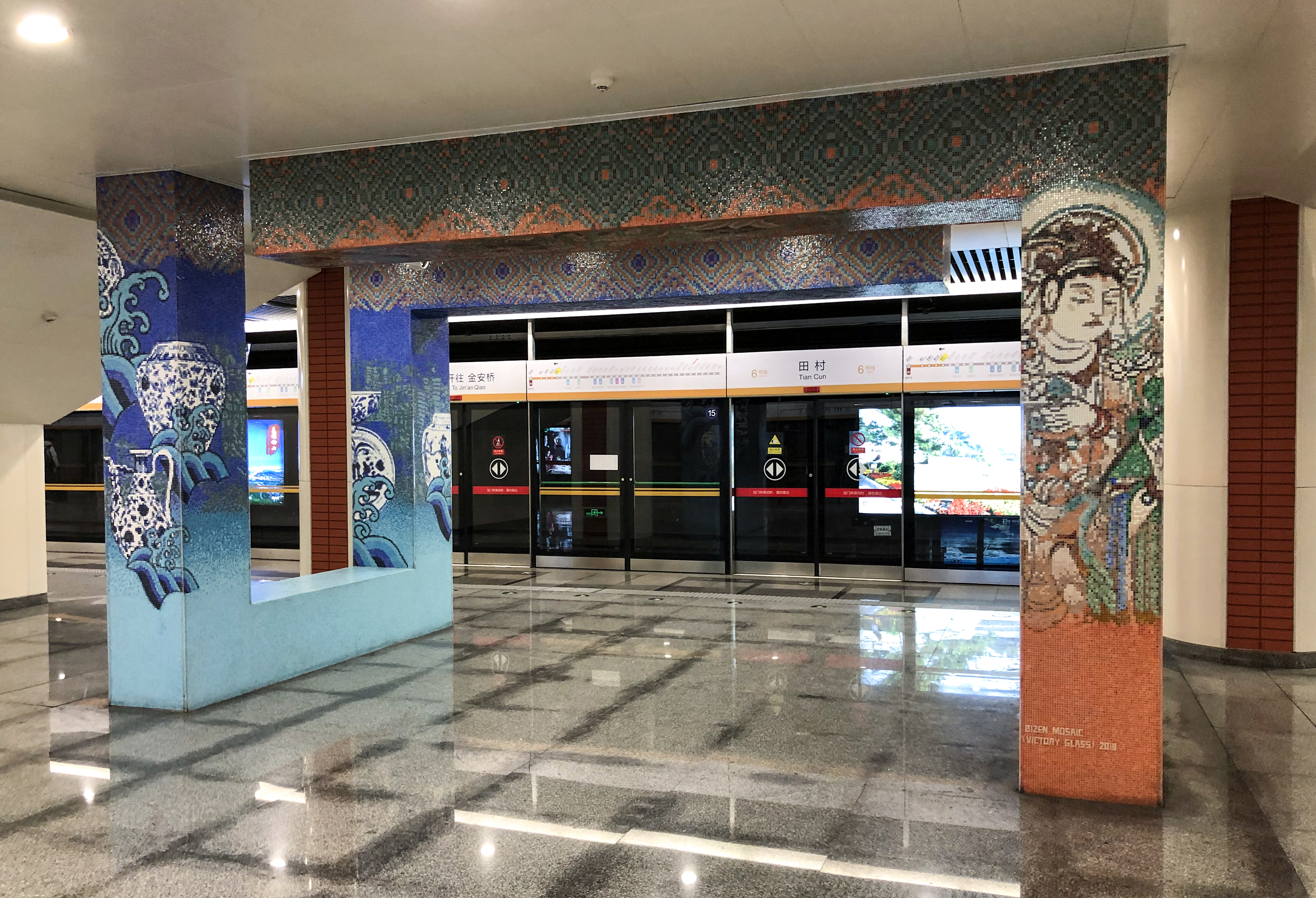
Silk Road Mosaic of Tian Cun station

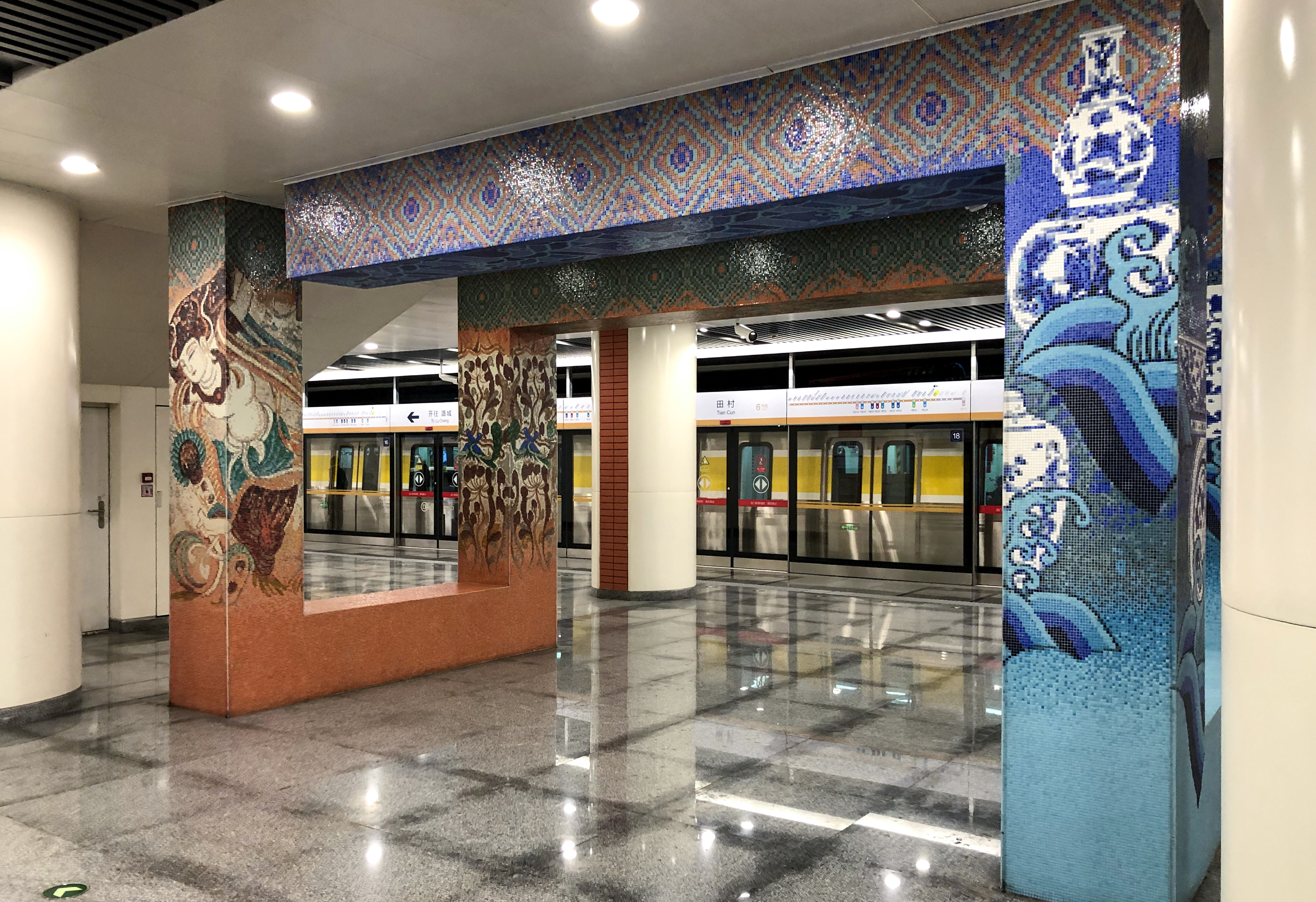
Silk Road Mosaic of Tian Cun station

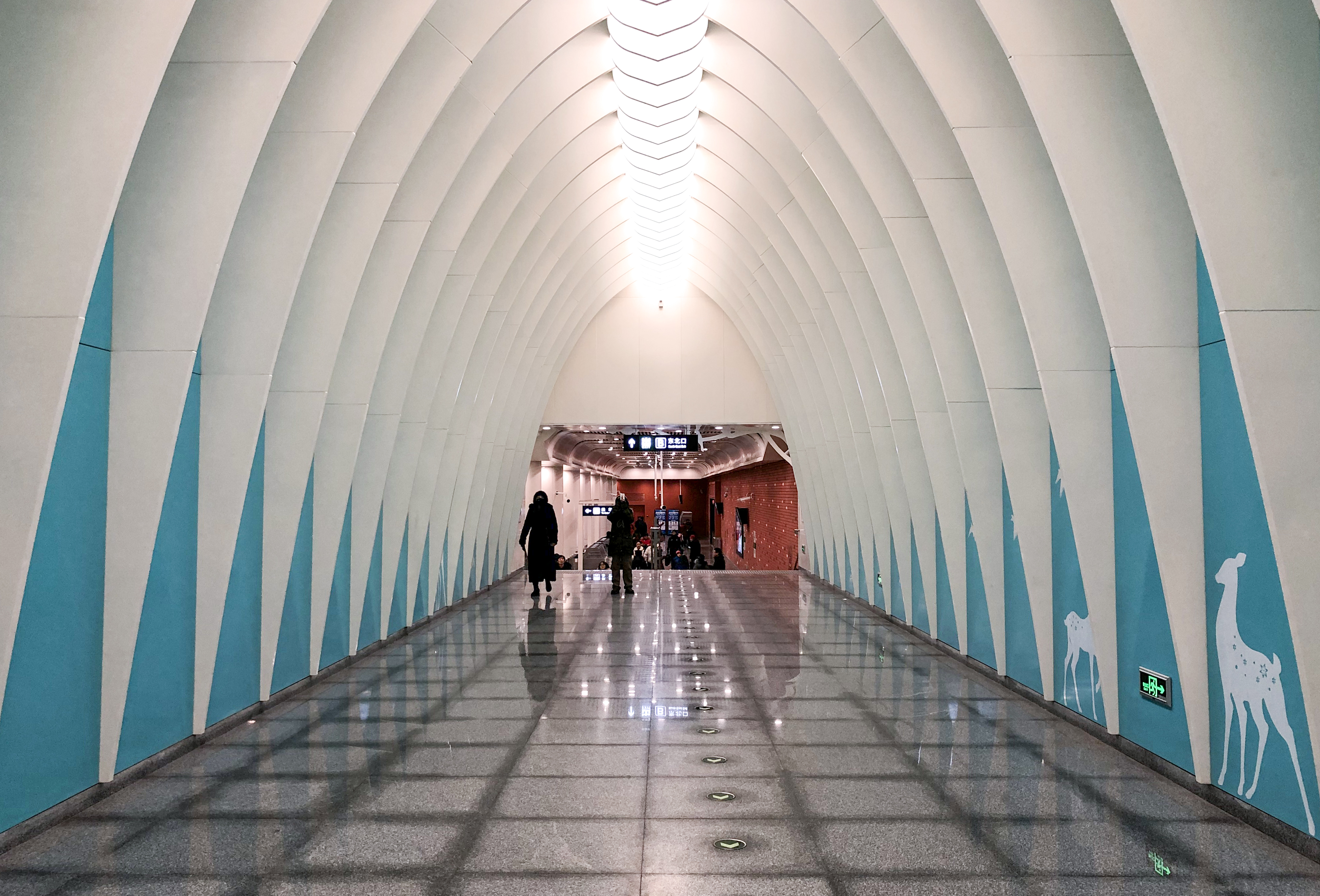
Corridor of Tian Cun station

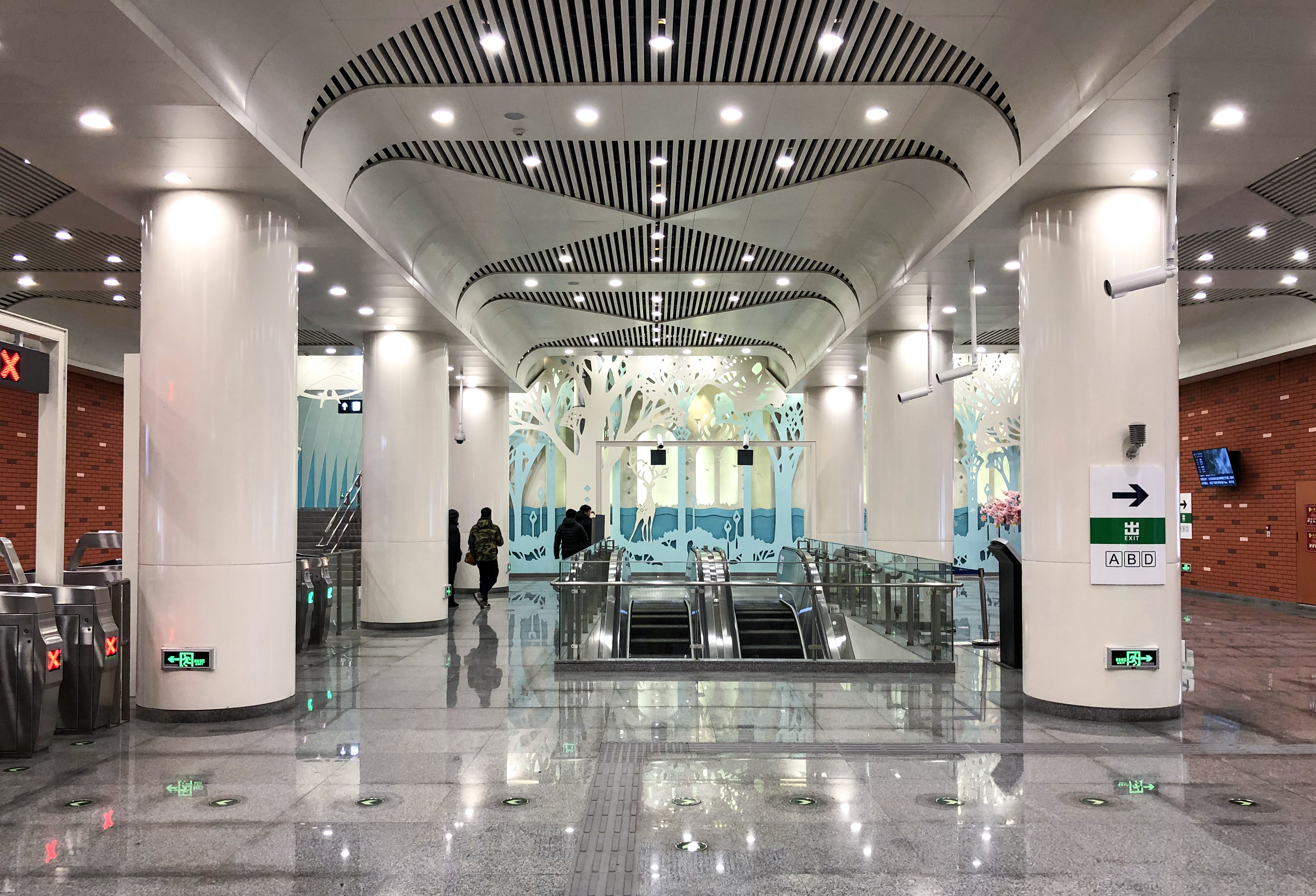
East hall of Tiancun Station

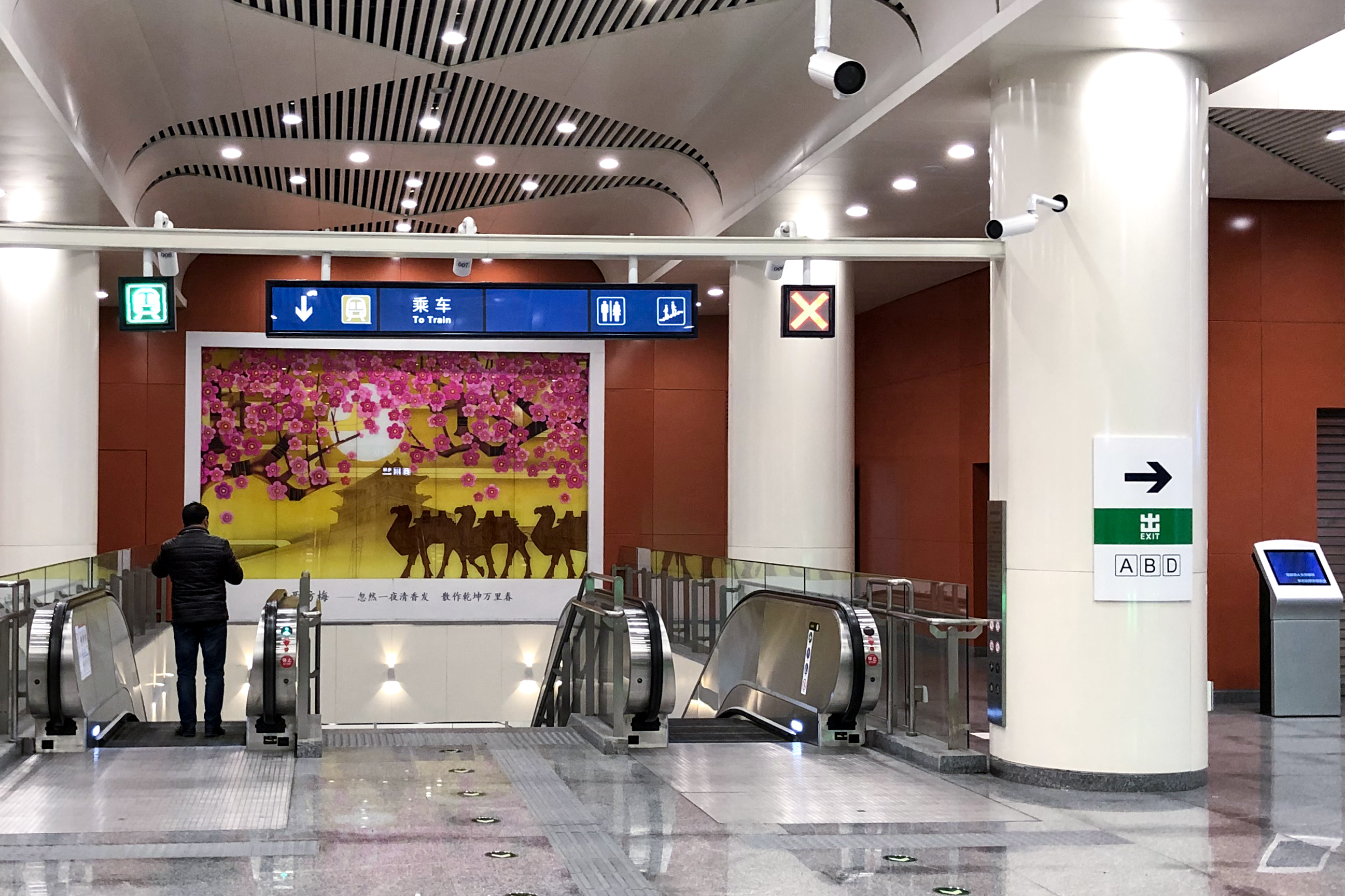
West hall of Tiancun Station

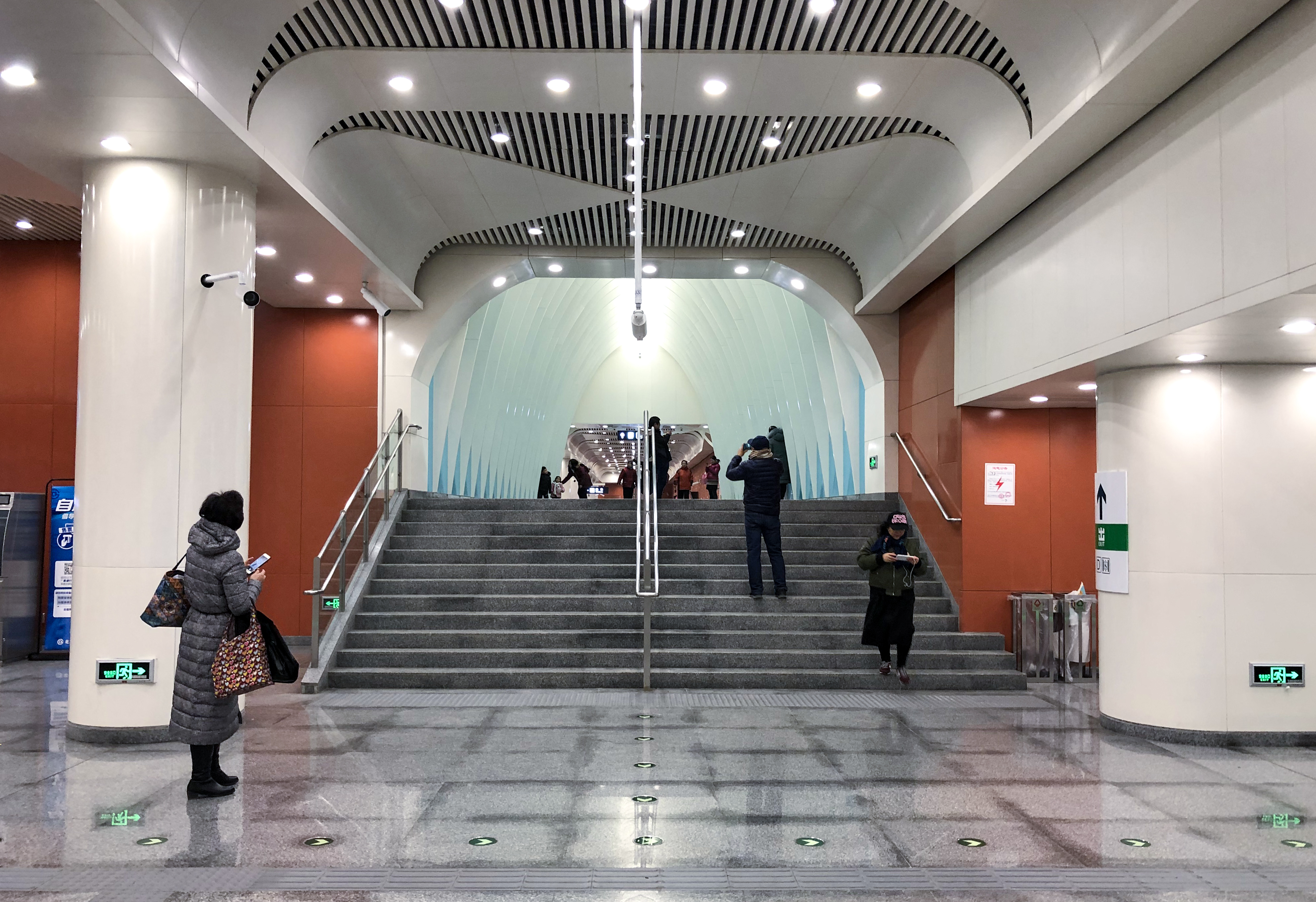
West hall of Tiancun Station
