= Line 3 (Beijing Subway) =

Rapid transit line in Beijing, China

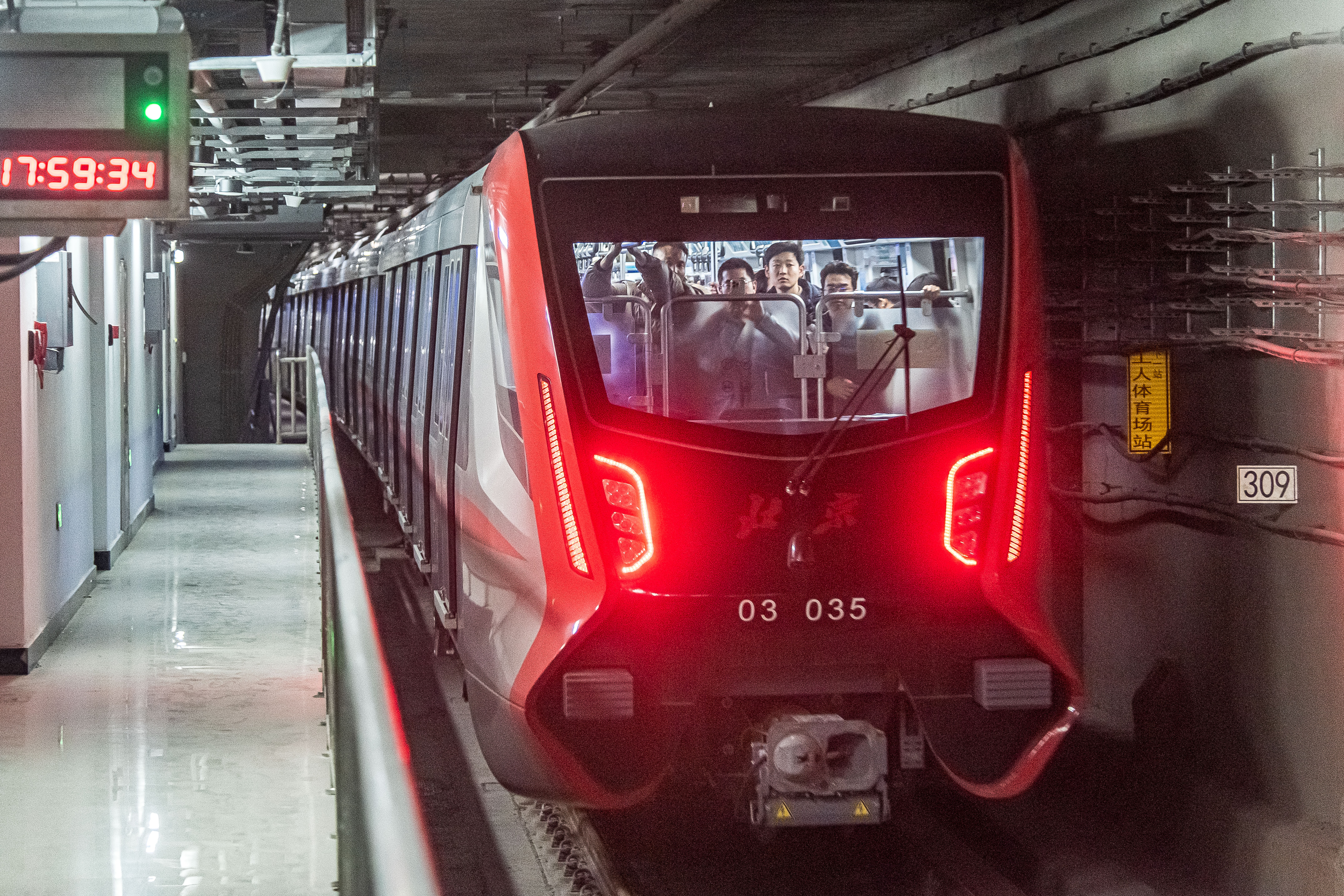
- A SFM86 type train leaving Dongsi Shitiao station of Line 3

Overview
- Other name: M3 (planned name)
- Status: Operational
- Termini: Dongsi Shitiao; Dongbabei
- Stations: 10 (Phase I)
- Colour on map: Red

Service
- Type: Rapid transit
- System: Beijing Subway
- Rolling stock: Type A, 4-car / 8-car
- Daily ridership: 121,700 (2025 Avg.)

History
- Opened: December 15, 2024; 21 months ago

Technical
- Line length: 14.7 km (9.1 mi) (Phase I)
- Character: Fully underground
- Track gauge: 1,435 mm (4 ft 8 1/2 in)
- Electrification: 1,500 V DC overhead catenary
- Operating speed: 80 km/h (50 mph)

Line 3 of the Beijing Subway (Chinese: 北京地铁3号线; pinyin: běijīng dìtiě sān hàoxiàn) is a rapid transit line in Beijing, China. It opened on December 15, 2024. It is colored rose red on system maps.

== Description ==
Phase 1

Phase 1 of Line 3 is 14.7 km (9.1 mi) with 10 stations. It is fully underground. Due to unstable planning east of Dongbabei station, line 3 will only open between Dongsi Shitiao and Dongbabei. It opened on December 15, 2024.

Phase 1 East extension

Phase 1 East extension from Dongbabei to Caogezhuangbei have been approved by NDRC in 2015. The extension will be 6.4 km in length with 5 stations. It will be fully underground.

== Stations ==
Station Name		Connections	Nearby Bus Stops	Distance km		Location
English	Chinese	Connections	Nearby Bus Stops	Distance km		Location
Dongsi Shitiao	东四十条	2	3 4 44 75 113 115 118 142 200 406 431 通医专线3 夜3 夜20 夜34	0.000	0.000	Dongcheng
Workers' Stadium	工人体育场	17	3 4 39 110 113 115 117 118 120 403 406 431 夜3 夜24 夜34	1.269	1.269	Chaoyang
Tuanjiehu	团结湖	10	4 39 95 113 115 117 302 405 406 431 499 650 675 687 690 快速直达专线195 快速直达专线196 夜3 夜30 夜34 专5 专114	0.934	2.203	Chaoyang
Chaoyang Park	朝阳公园	14	31 117 135 302 406 412 419 431 499 650 675 682 690 973 988 夜3	1.757	3.960	Chaoyang
Shifoying	石佛营		140 406 408 412 431 451 486 499 640 650 675 989 991 夜3	1.669	5.629	Chaoyang
Chaoyang railway station	朝阳站	IFP	413 418 911 夜13 专194 专195	1.218	6.847	Chaoyang
Yaojiayuan	姚家园		专50 专153	2.093	8.940	Chaoyang
Dongbanan	东坝南		350 406 553 571 640 650 672 989 专92	2.362	11.302	Chaoyang
Dongba	东坝		350 406 553 571 640 659 973 989	1.544	12.846	Chaoyang
Dongbabei	东坝北	12	专30 592	1.621	14.467	Chaoyang

== Rolling stock ==
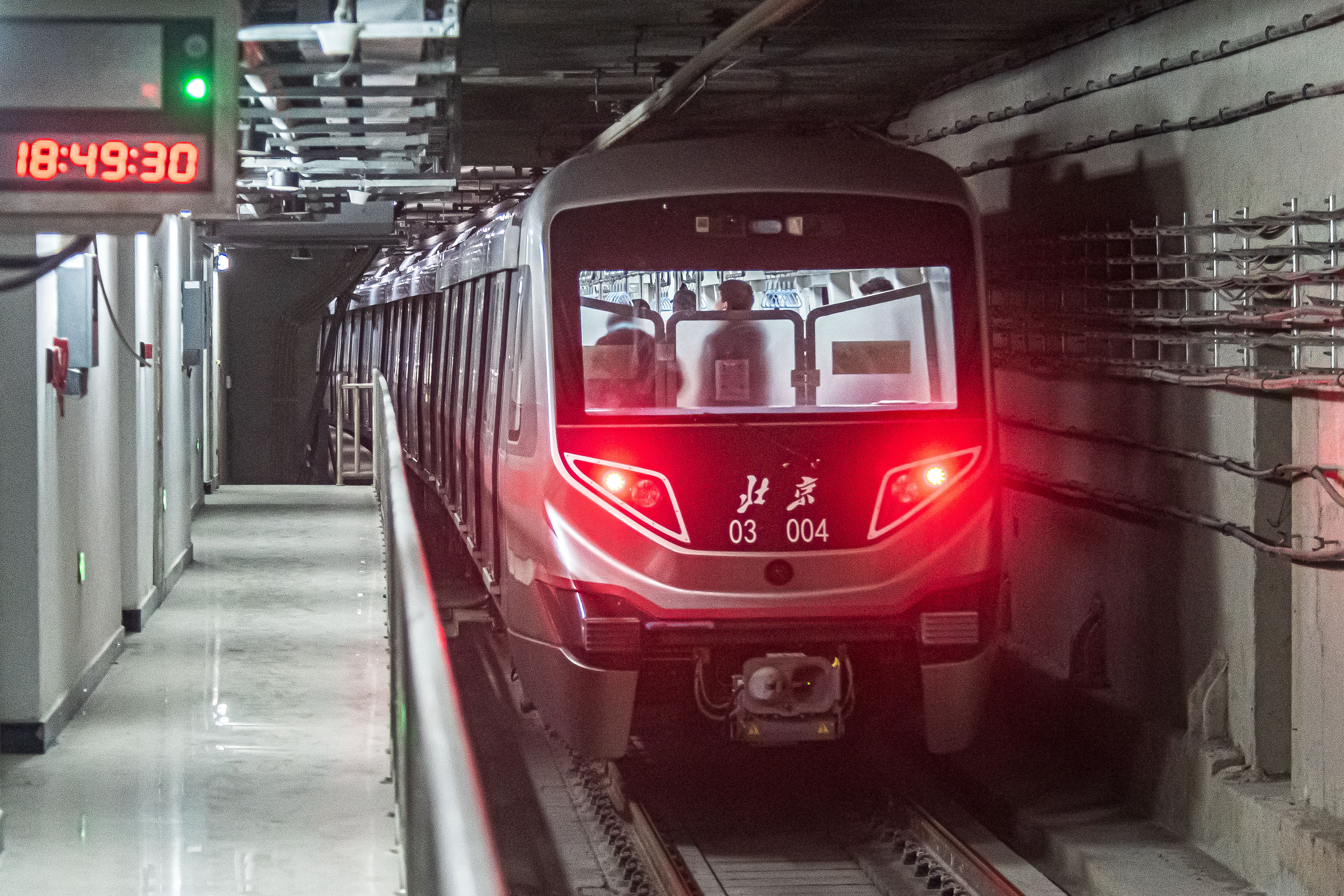
A ZBM06 train leaving Dongsi Shitiao station

Line 3 will initially use 4-car Type A rolling stock but platforms are designed to support expansion to 8-car trains.

== History ==
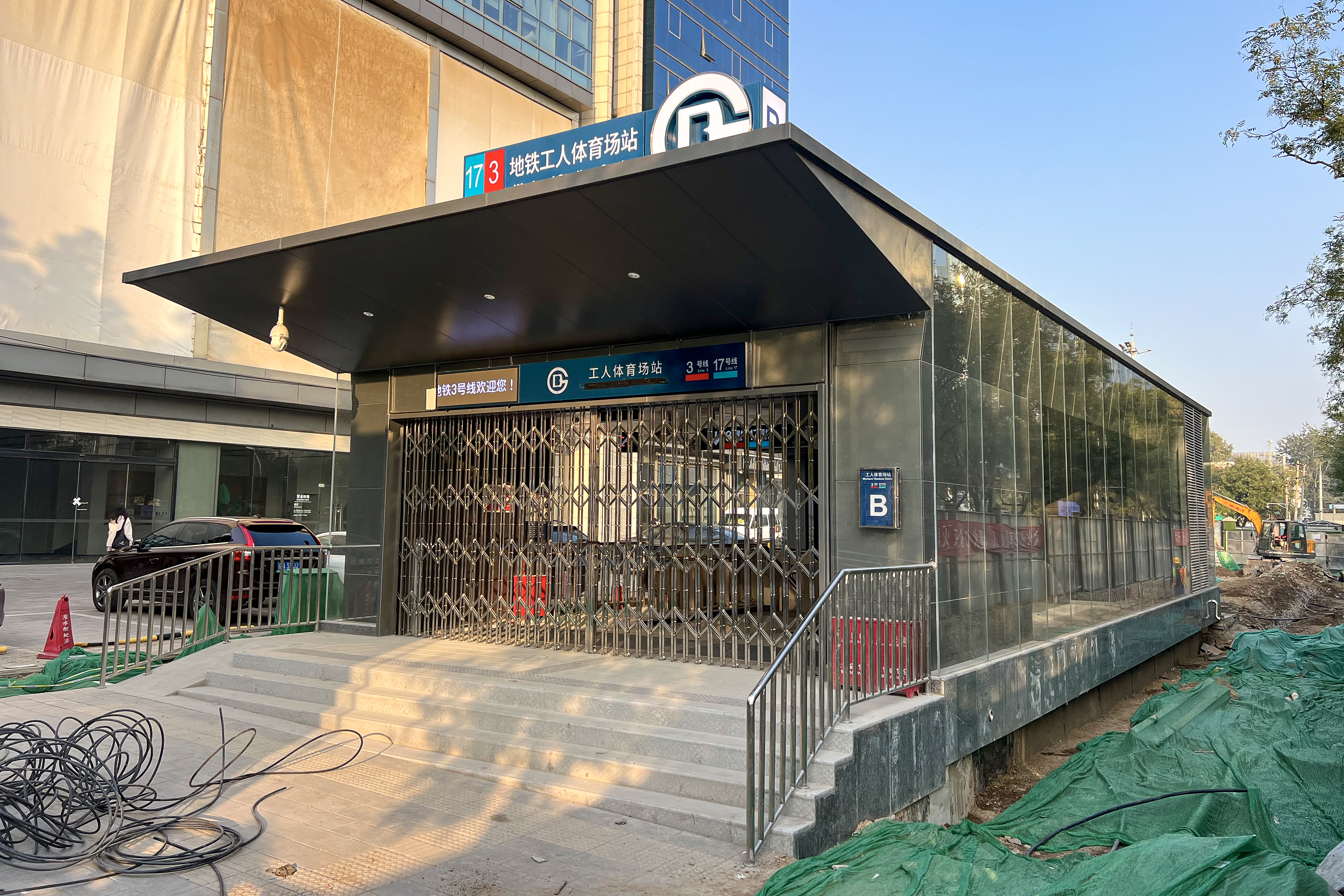
Exit B of Workers' Stadium station, Line 3.

Line 3's route has undergone substantial changes on the planners' drawing board. In the late 1990s, one draft of the subway plan showed Line 3 running from Xiaomeichang to Cuigezhuang. Half of that route was then folded into Line 6. In 2010 and 2011, Line 3 was mentioned in the development plans of other subway lines.

By January 2012, the Line 3's western section was slated to run east from Tiancun station in Haidian District under Fushi Road to Fuchengmen station. On March 15, 2012, Line 3 was reportedly planned to run from Tiancun station to the eastern suburbs of Beijing in Gaoxinzhuang and Pingfang and to be built by 2020.

In June 2012, Beijing media reported the station plan of Line 3.

In January 2013, subway planners were examining whether to extend the Line 3 through the city centre given the concentration of historic relics in the area. In January 2014, it was reported that Line 3 will have 27 stations, with up to 16 transfer stations, including Ganjiakou station on Line 16 and Zhangzizhonglu on Line 5. The station plan for Ganjiakou had been released in 2013 by Beijing Municipal Commission of Urban Planning, which depicted the Line 3 platform built over that of Line 16. In February 2014, an official was quoted as saying that "Line 3 would run along Di'anmen Street, not Jingshan Front Street, with paralleling from Ping'anli to Nanluoguxiang."

On September 14, 2015, Line 3 (from Tiancun to Caogezhuangbei) was approved by NDRC. It will be 37.4 km in length with 27 stations. On April 19, 2016, the first phase of Line 3 started construction.

On May 1, 2024, the Beijing Municipal Commission of Planning and Natural Resources adopted station names of line 3 phase 1. On June 15, 2024, test run of line 3 has started.

On September 29, 2024, Beijing Infrastructure Investment (BII) company announced the planning scheme of line 3 eastern extension, a 6.4 km underground section with 5 new stations, but of which the potential termini Caogezhuangbei will only have reservation places for future plans. Once eastern extension completed, it will connect with line 20 (R4) at Guanzhuangluxikou, and line M101 at Gaoxinzhuang.
