= Liaogongzhuang station =

Beijing Subway station

Liaogongzhuang 廖公庄
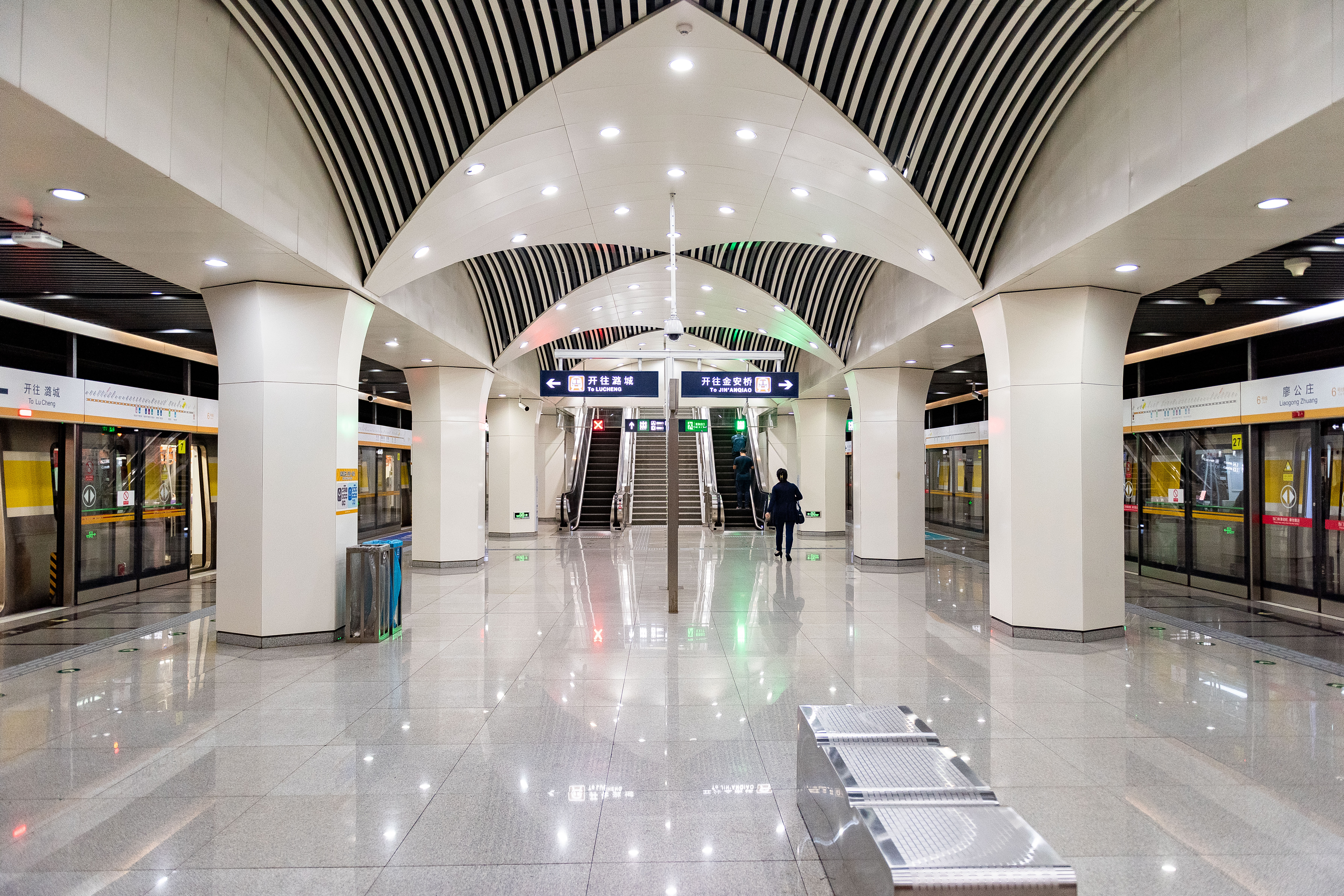
- Platform

General information
- Location: Tiancun Road, Haidian District, Beijing; China
- Coordinates: 39.931154°N 116.220863°E
- Operator: Beijing Mass Transit Railway Operation Corporation Limited
- Line: Line 6
- Platforms: 2 (1 island platform)
- Tracks: 2

Construction
- Structure type: Underground
- Accessible: Yes

History
- Opened: December 30, 2018; 7 years ago

Services
Preceding station	Beijing Subway	Following station
Xihuangcun towards Jin'anqiao	Line 6	Tiancun towards Luyang
Location
- Location within Beijing

Liaogongzhuang station (Chinese: 廖公庄站; pinyin: Liàogōng Zhuāng zhàn) is a station on Line 6 of the Beijing Subway. The station is located at the junction of Tiancun Road and Jushan Road in Haidian District. It was opened on December 30, 2018.

== Station layout ==
The station has an underground island platform.

== Exits ==
There are 3 exits, lettered A, B, and D. Exit D is accessible.
