= Shifoying station =

Beijing Subway Line 3 station

Shifoying 石佛营
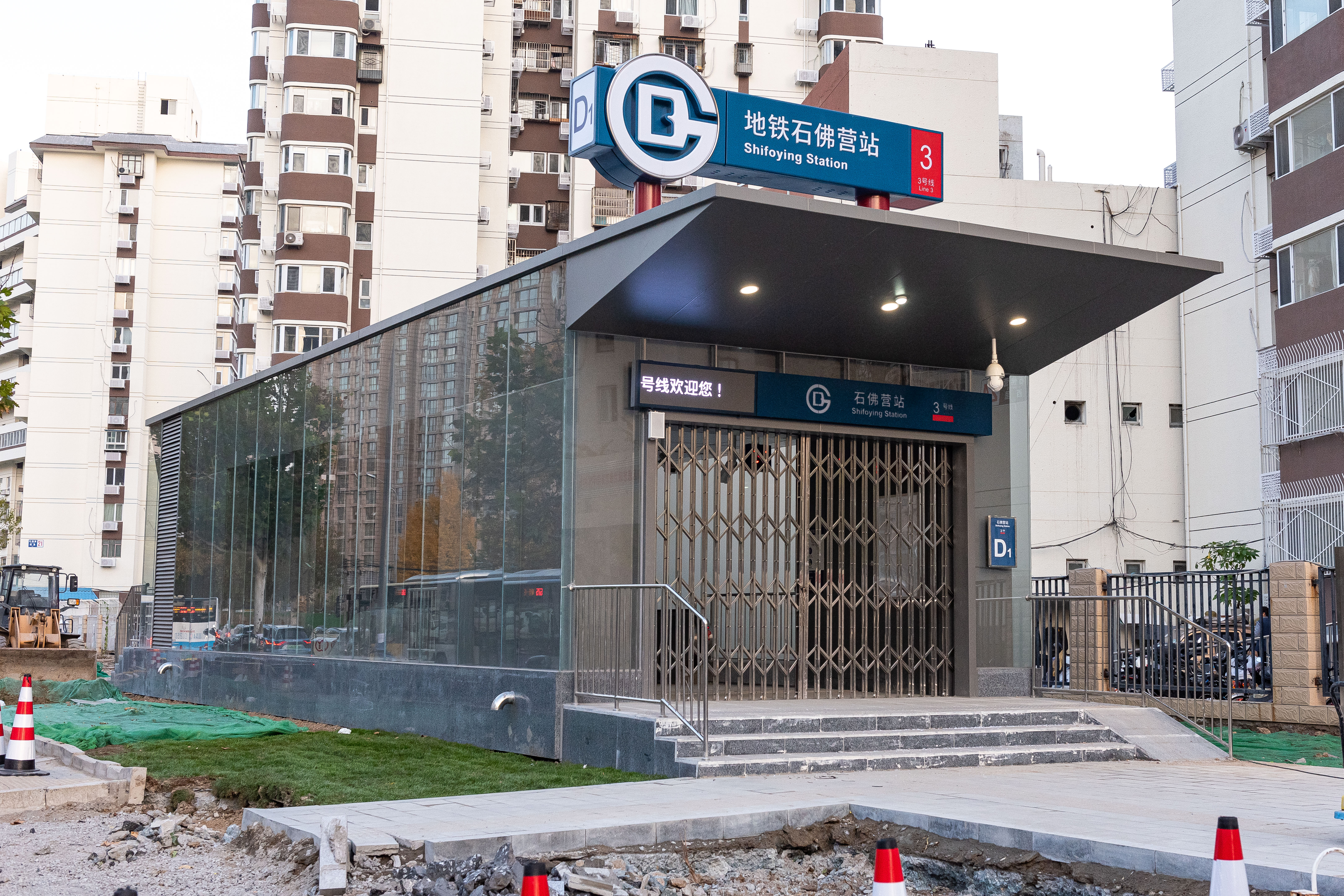
- Exit D1 (November 2024)

Chinese name
- Simplified Chinese: 石佛营站
- Traditional Chinese: 石佛營站
Transcriptions
Standard Mandarin
- Hanyu Pinyin: Shífóyíng zhàn

General information
- Location: Intersection of Yaojiayuan Road (姚家园路) and Huazhang East Road (华章东路), Dongfeng Area; Chaoyang District, Beijing; China
- Coordinates: 39°56′04″N 116°29′35″E
- Operator: Beijing Mass Transit Railway Operation Corporation Limited
- Line: Line 3
- Platforms: 2 (1 split island platform)
- Tracks: 2

Construction
- Structure type: Underground
- Accessible: Yes

History
- Opened: December 15, 2024; 20 months ago

Services
Preceding station	Beijing Subway	Following station
Chaoyang Park towards Dongsi Shitiao	Line 3	Chaoyang railway station towards Dongbabei
Location
- Location within Beijing

Shifoying station (simplified Chinese: 石佛营站; traditional Chinese: 石佛營站; pinyin: Shífóyíng zhàn) is a station on Line 3 of the Beijing Subway. It opened on December 15, 2024.

== Location ==
The station is located underground at the intersection of Yaojiayuan Road and Huazhang Road East in Dongfeng Area, Chaoyang District.

== Station features ==
The station has an underground split island platform.

== Exits ==
There are 7 exits, lettered A1, A2, B, C1, C2, D1 and D2. Exit A2 has an accessible elevator.

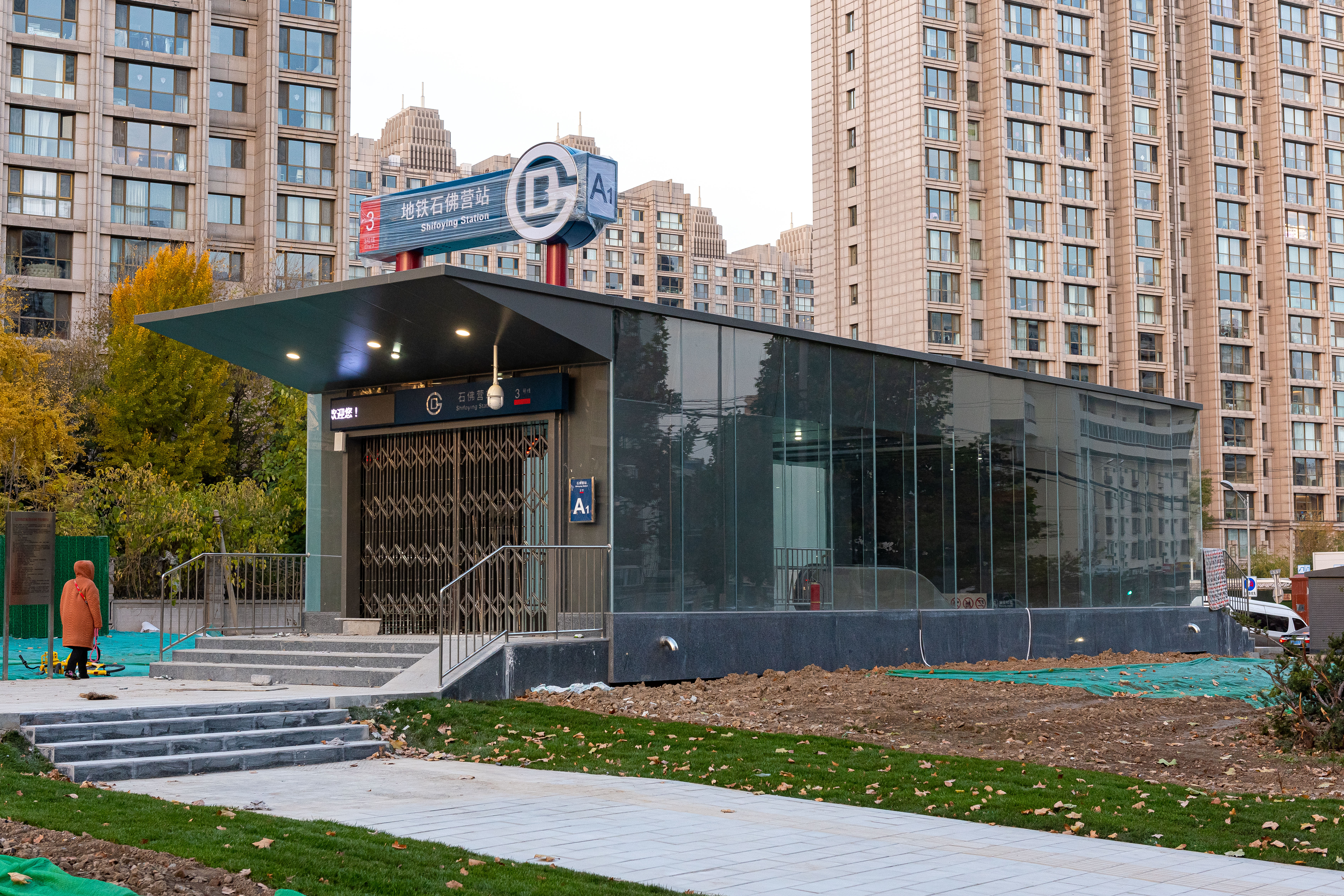
Exit A1

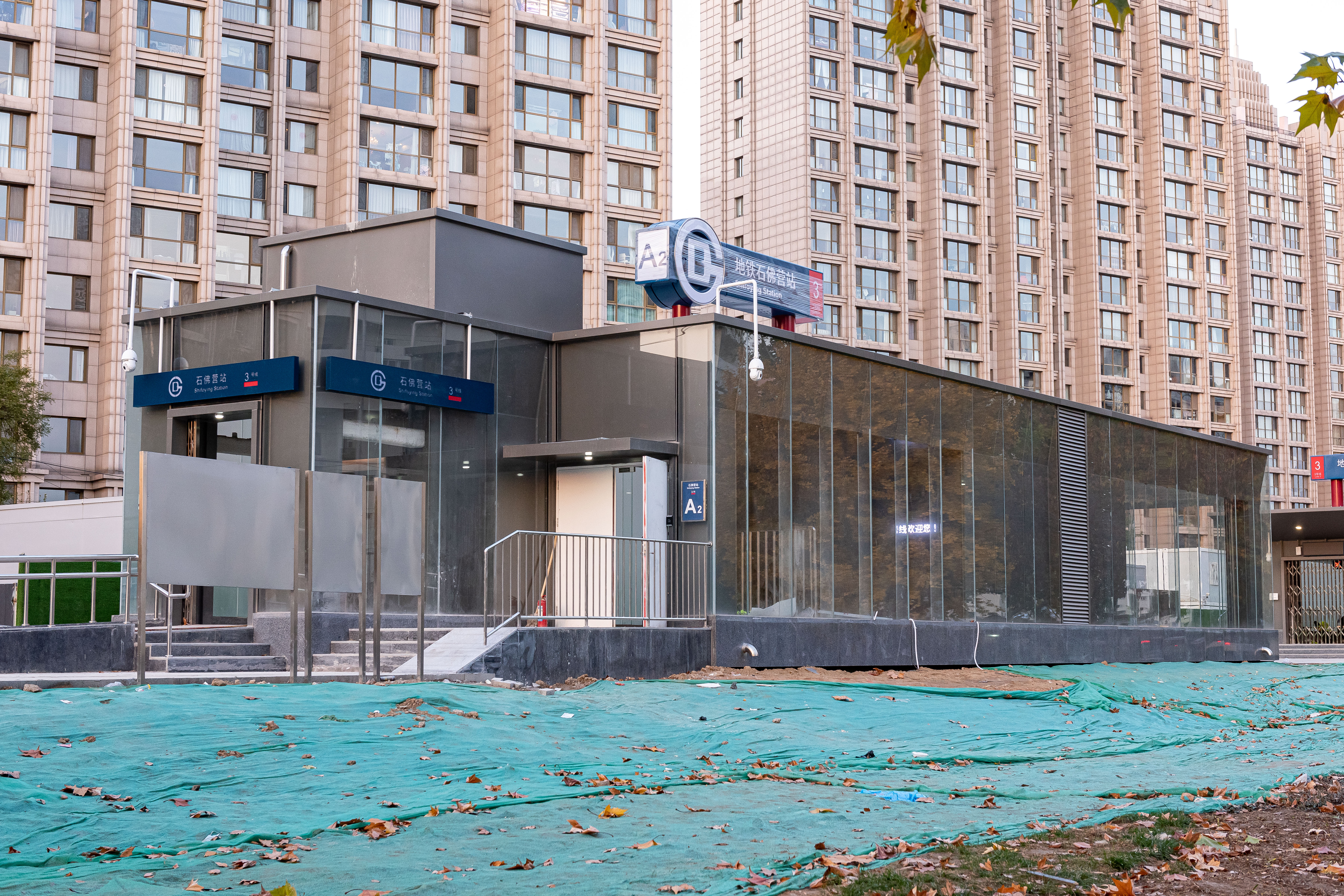
Exit A2

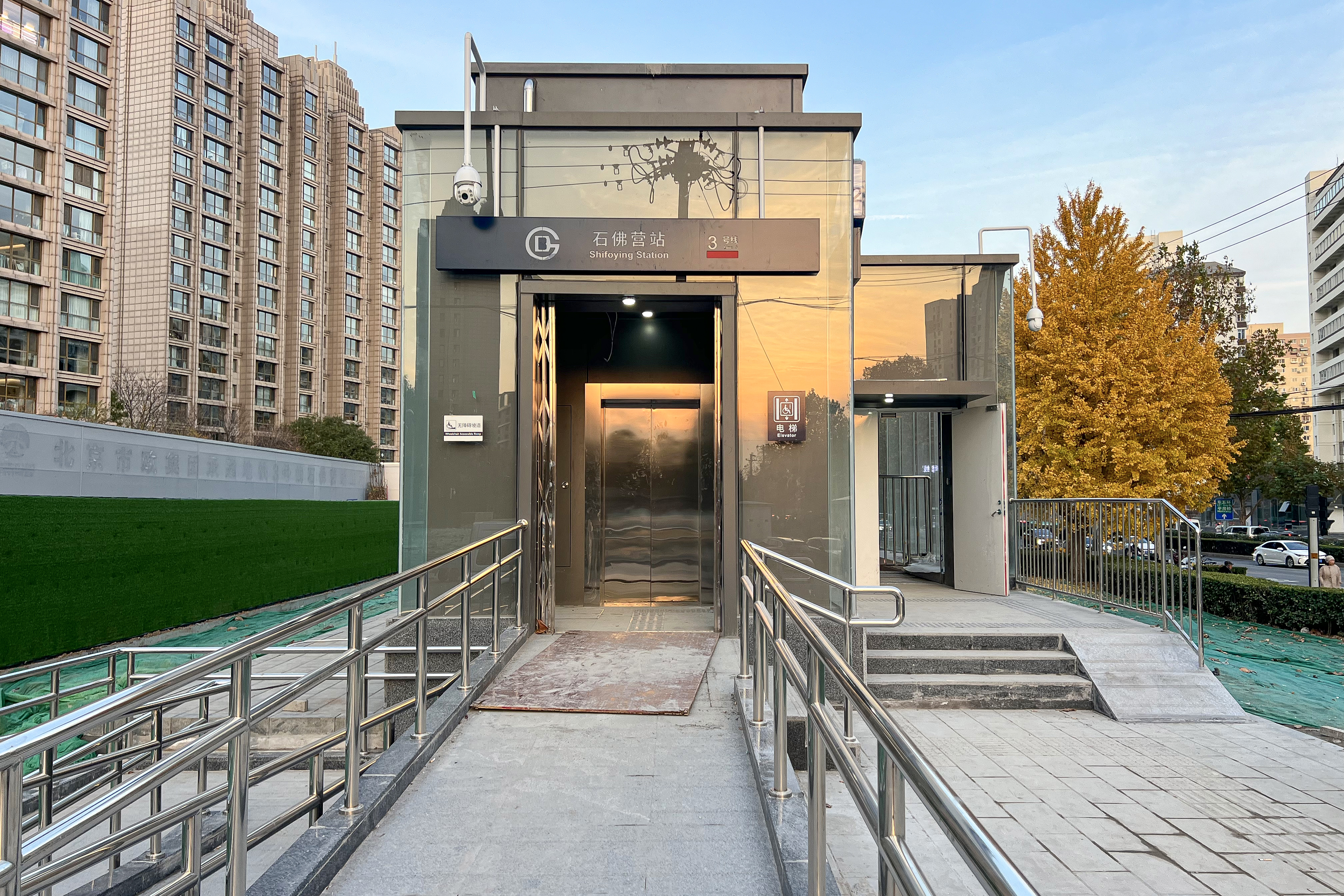
Exit A2 accessible exit

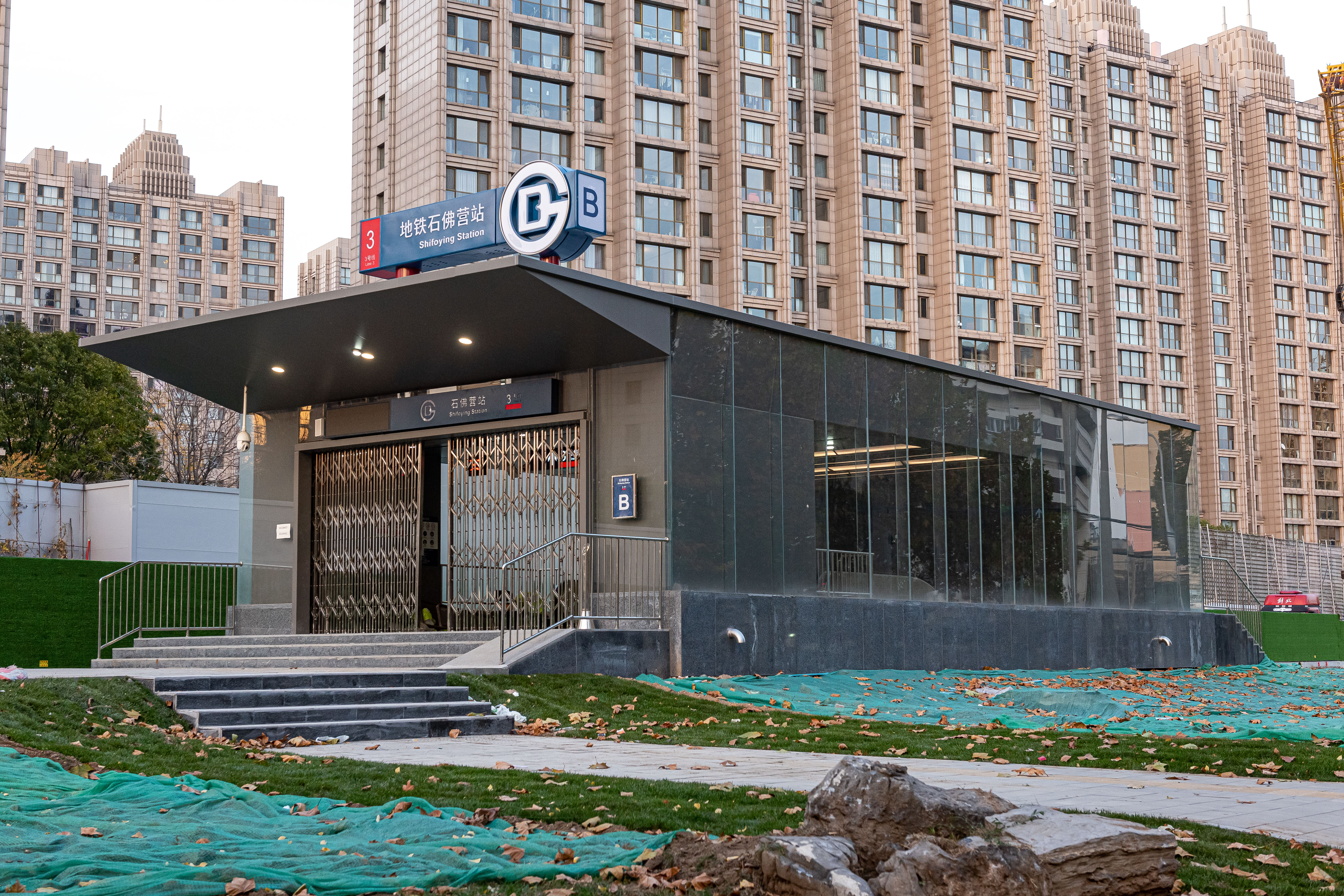
Exit B

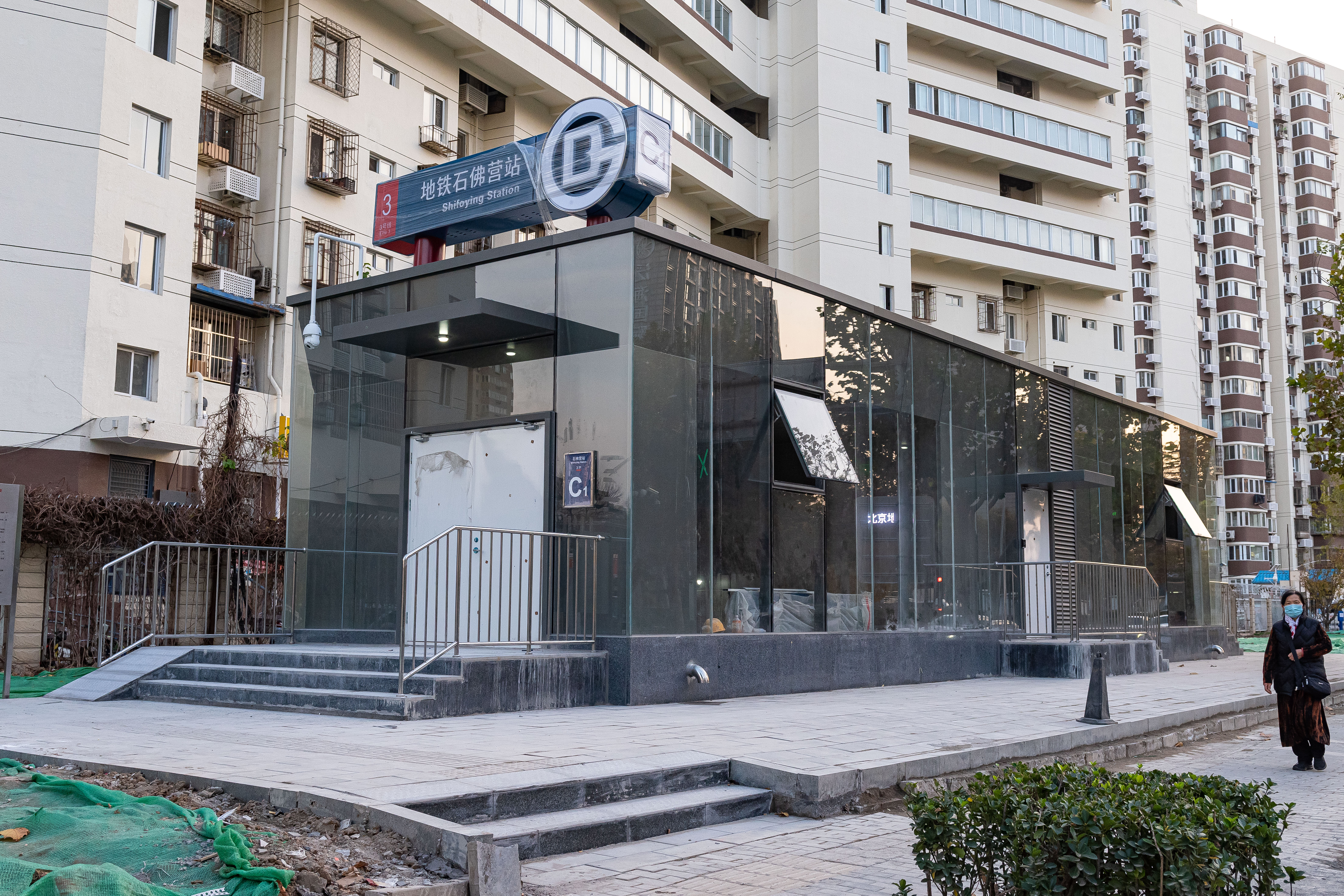
Exit C1

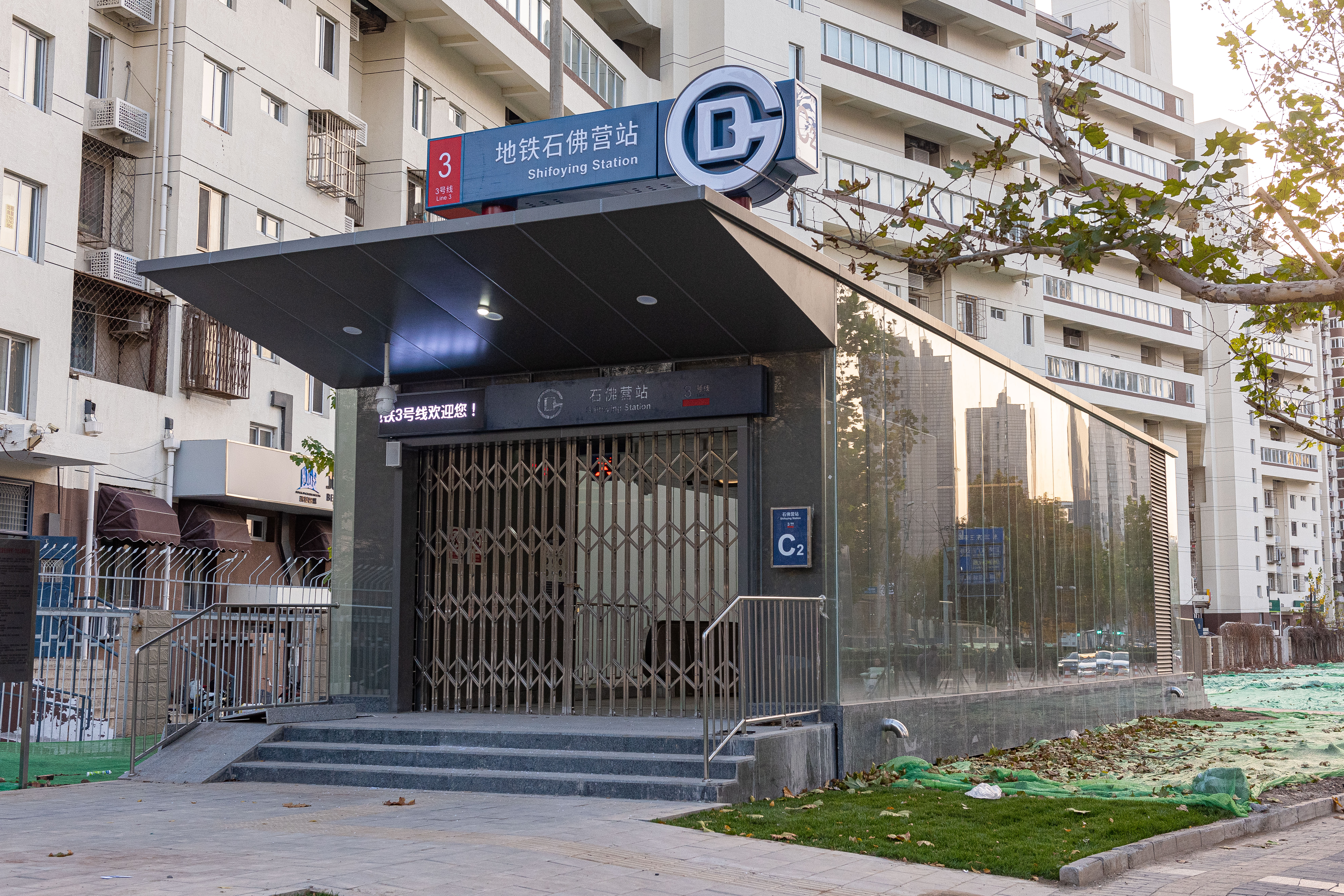
Exit C2

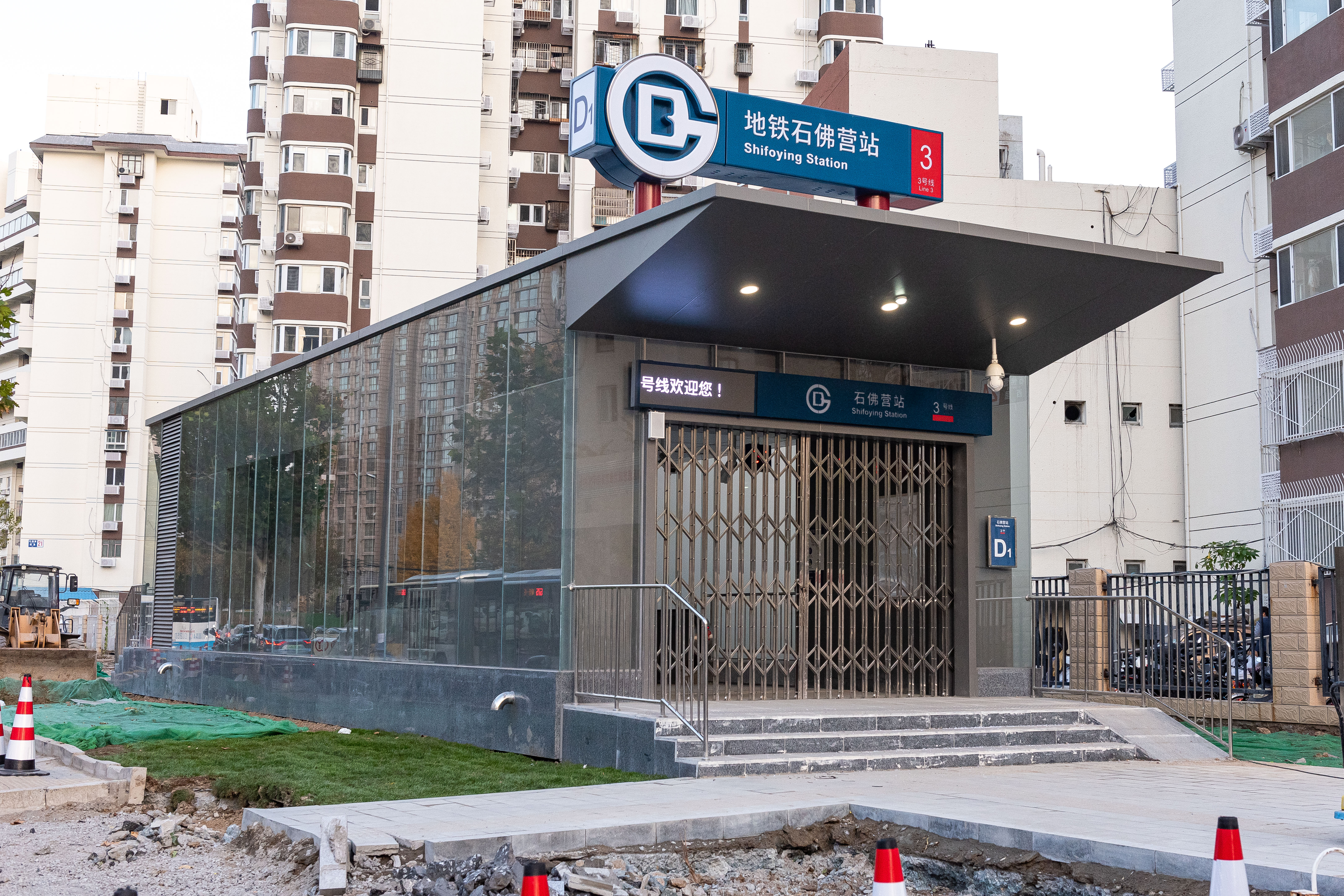
Exit D1

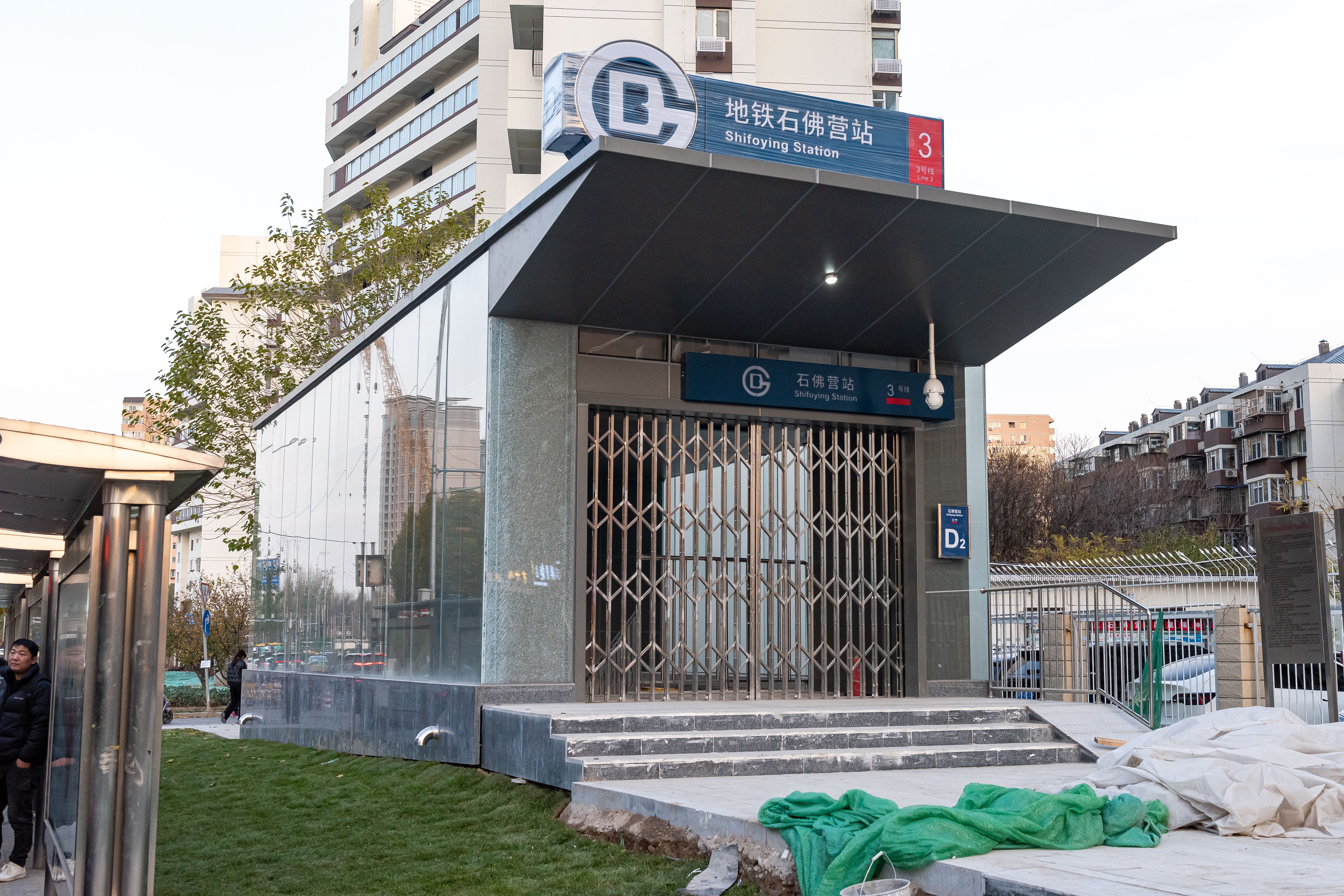
Exit D2
