= Chaoyang Park station =

Beijing Subway Line 3 and Line 14 station

Chaoyang Park 朝阳公园
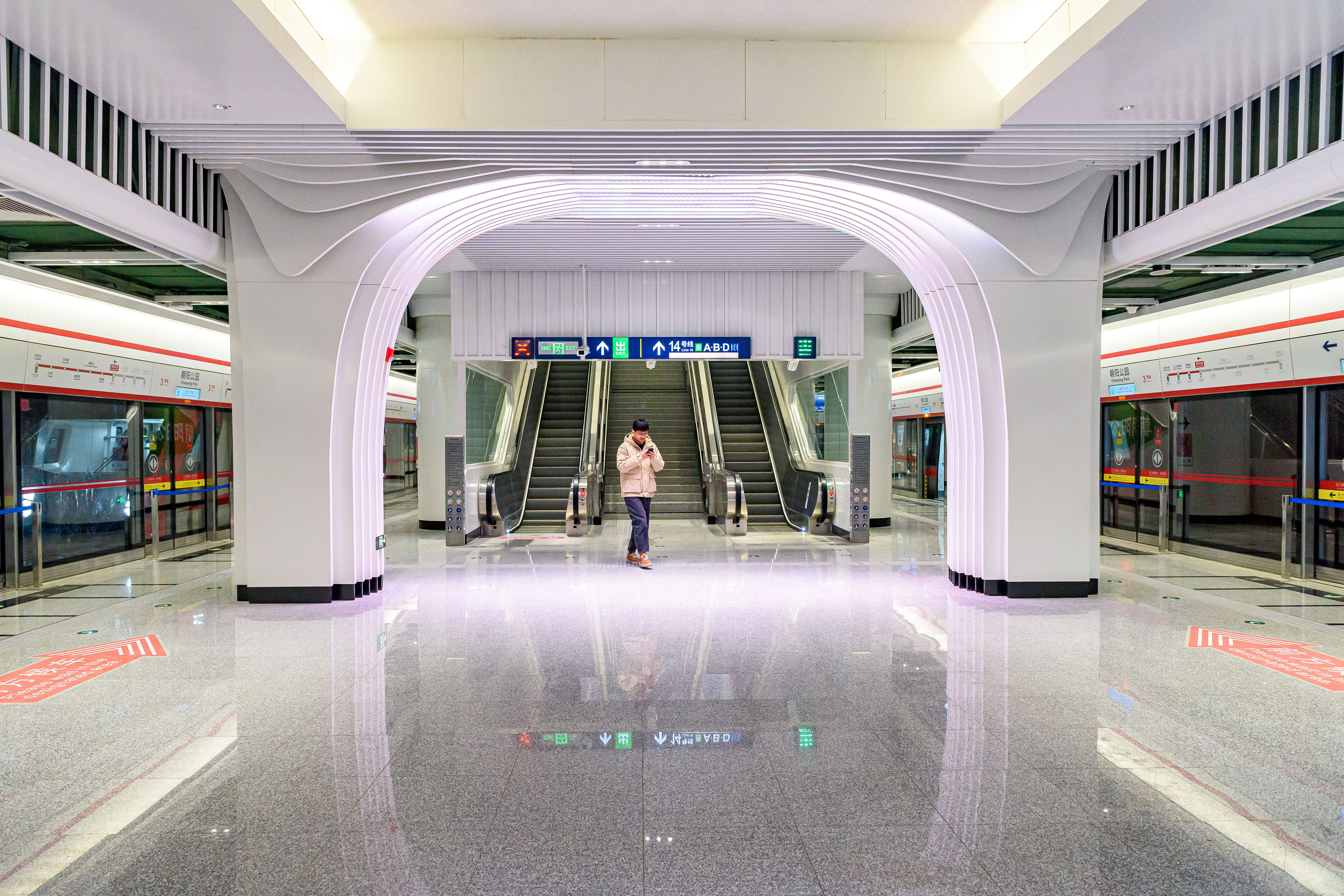
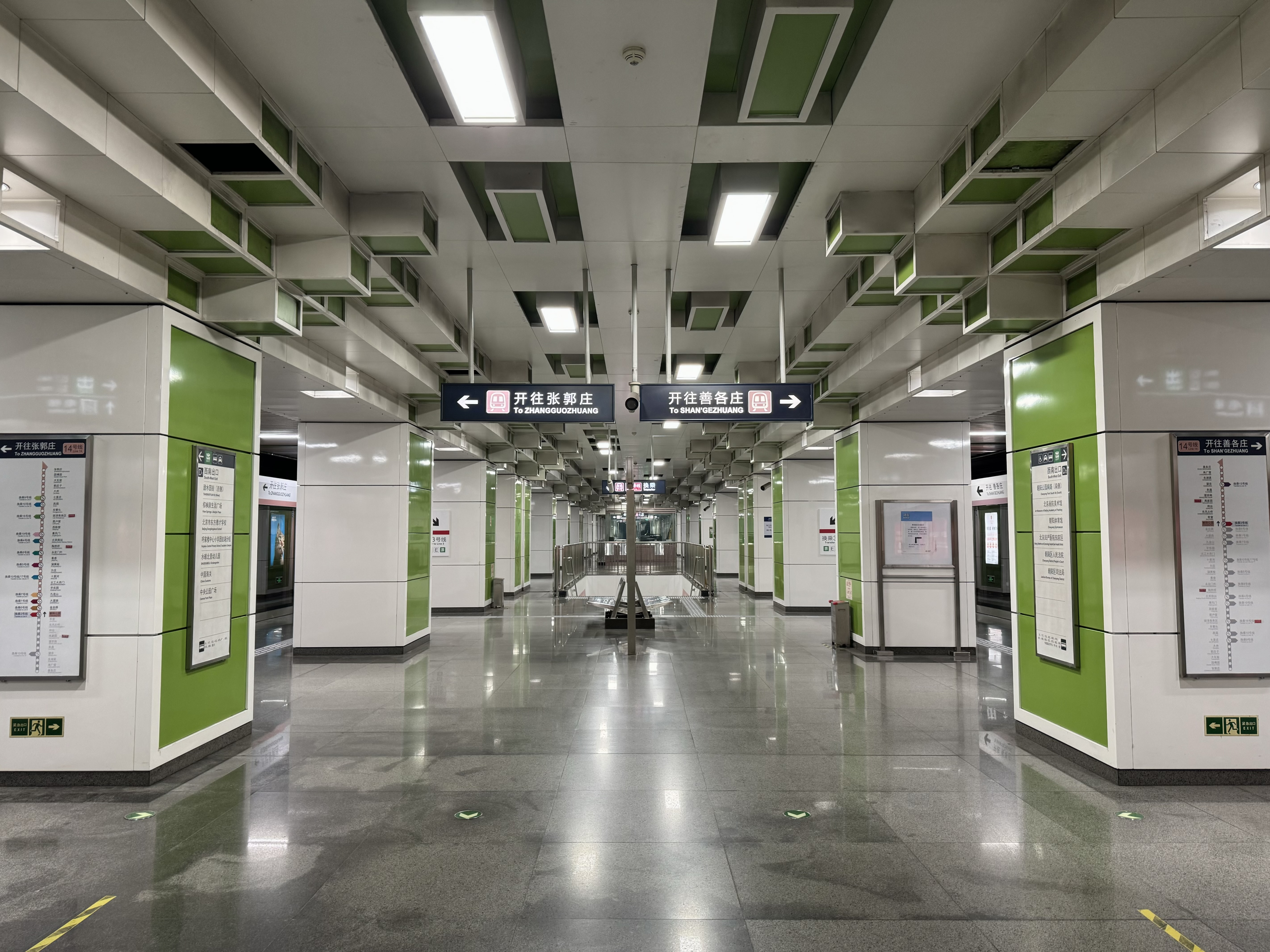
- Platform for Line 3 Platform for Line 14

General information
- Location: Tianshuiyuan Street (甜水园街) and Chaoyang Park South Road (朝阳公园南路); Chaoyang District, Beijing; China
- Coordinates: 39°56′01″N 116°28′42″E
- Operator: Beijing MTR Corporation Limited
- Lines: Line 3; Line 14
- Platforms: 4 (2 island platforms)
- Tracks: 4

Construction
- Structure type: Underground
- Accessible: Yes

History
- Opened: Line 14: December 31, 2016; 9 years ago; Line 3: December 15, 2024; 20 months ago

Services
Preceding station	Beijing Subway	Following station
Tuanjiehu towards Dongsi Shitiao	Line 3	Shifoying towards Dongbabei
Jintai Lu towards Zhangguozhuang	Line 14	Zaoying towards Shangezhuang
Location
- Location within Beijing

Chaoyang Park station (simplified Chinese: 朝阳公园站; traditional Chinese: 朝陽公園站; pinyin: Cháoyáng Gōngyuán zhàn) is an interchange station between Line 3 and Line 14 of the Beijing Subway. It is located near Chaoyang Park in Chaoyang District. The Line 14 station opened on 31 December 2016, and the Line 3 station opened on December 15, 2024.

== Station layout ==
The station has underground island platforms for both Line 3 and Line 14, with a gateway in the centre for interchange with Line 3 on the Line 14 platform.

== Exits ==
There are 8 exits, lettered A, B, D1, D2, E, F, G1 and G2. Exits D2, F and G2 have accessible elevators.

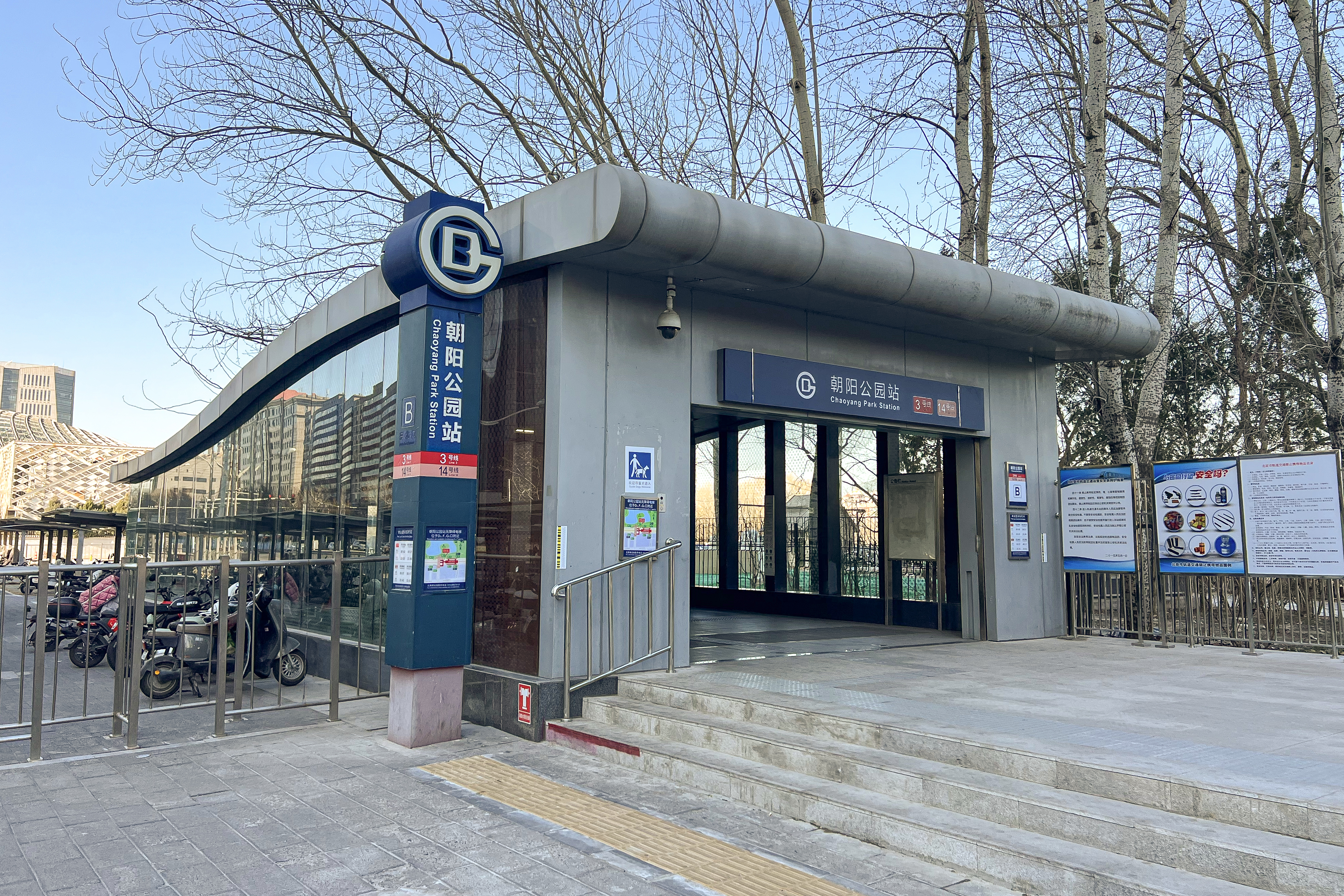
Exit B, Line 14

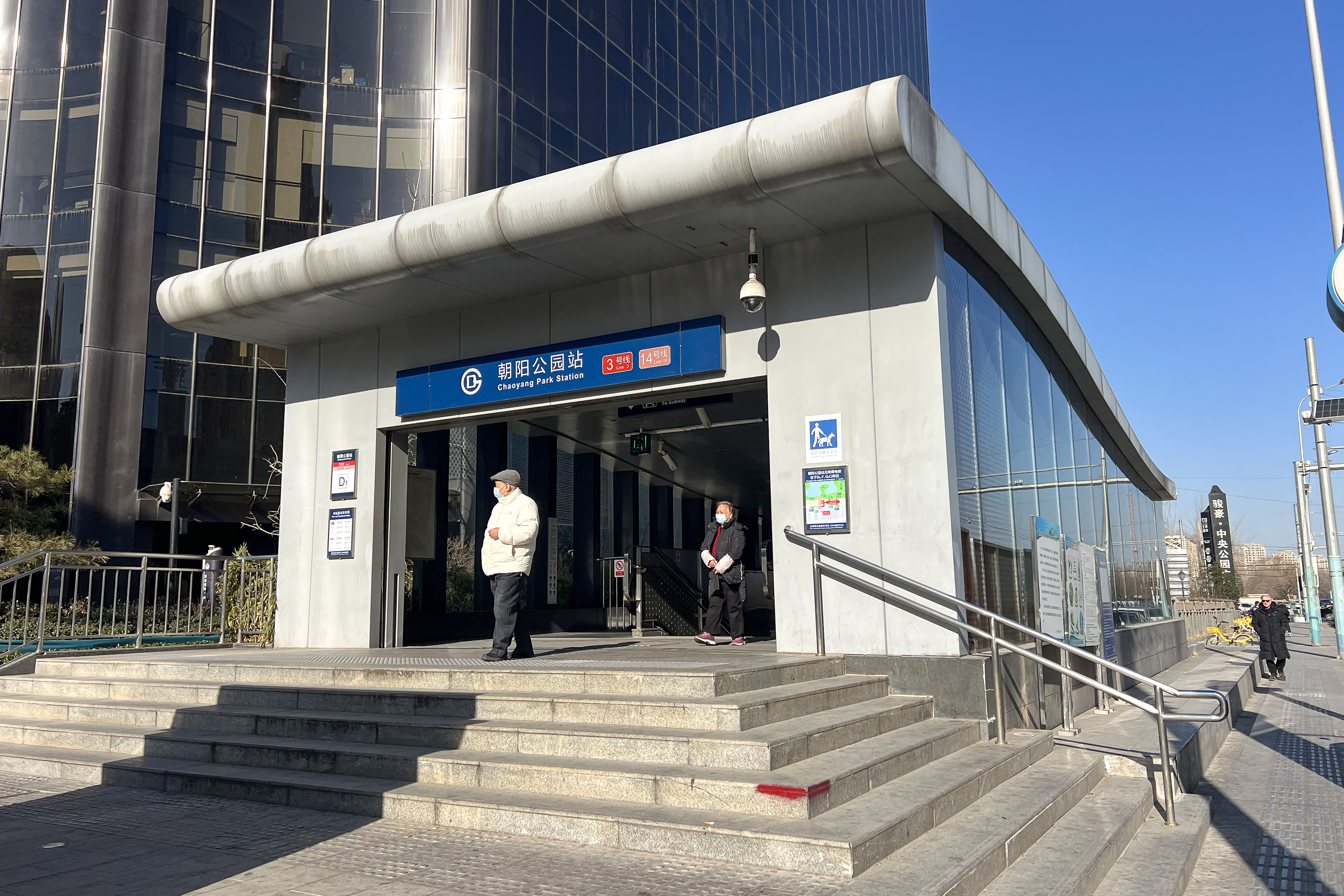
Exit D1, Line 14

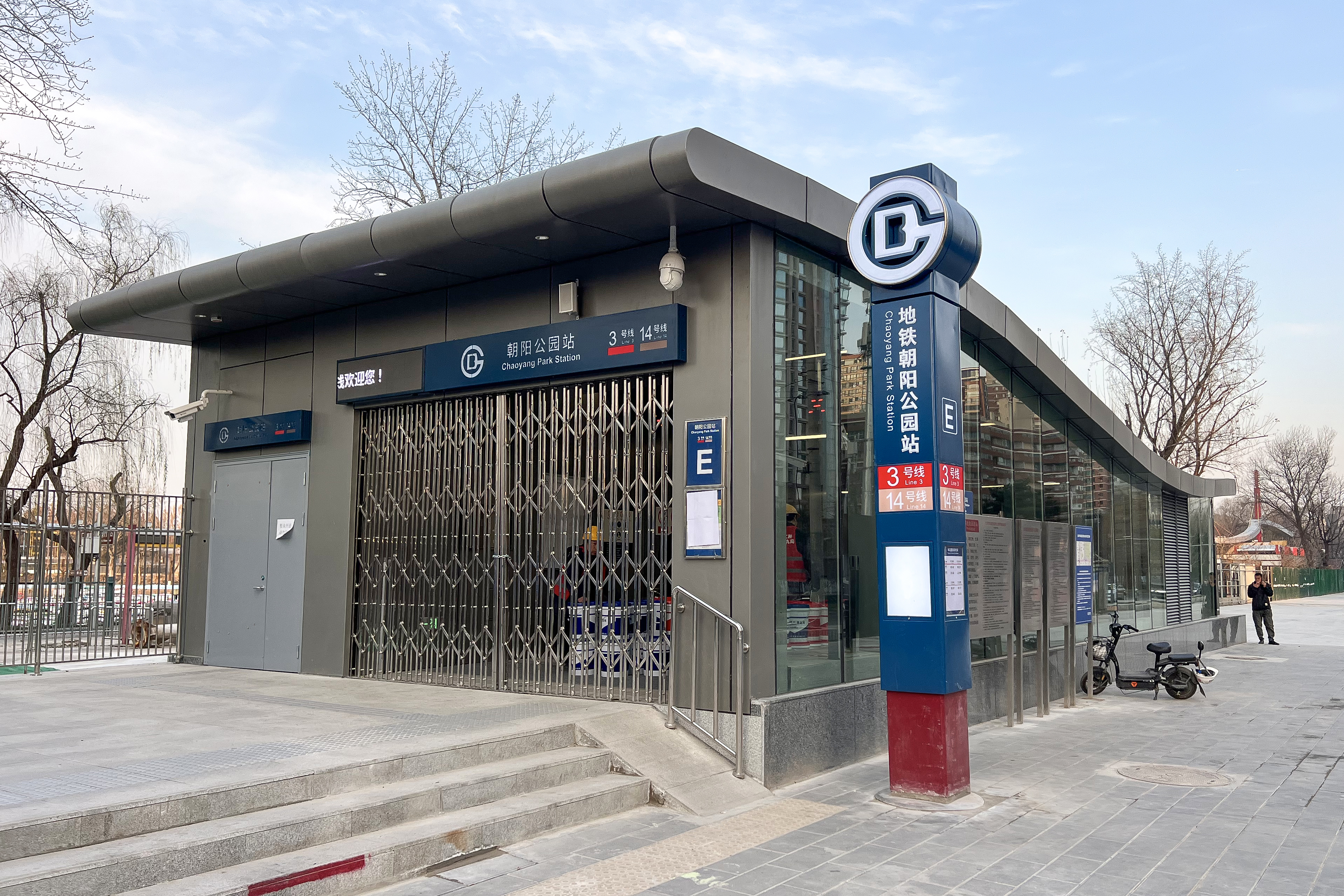
Exit E, Line 3

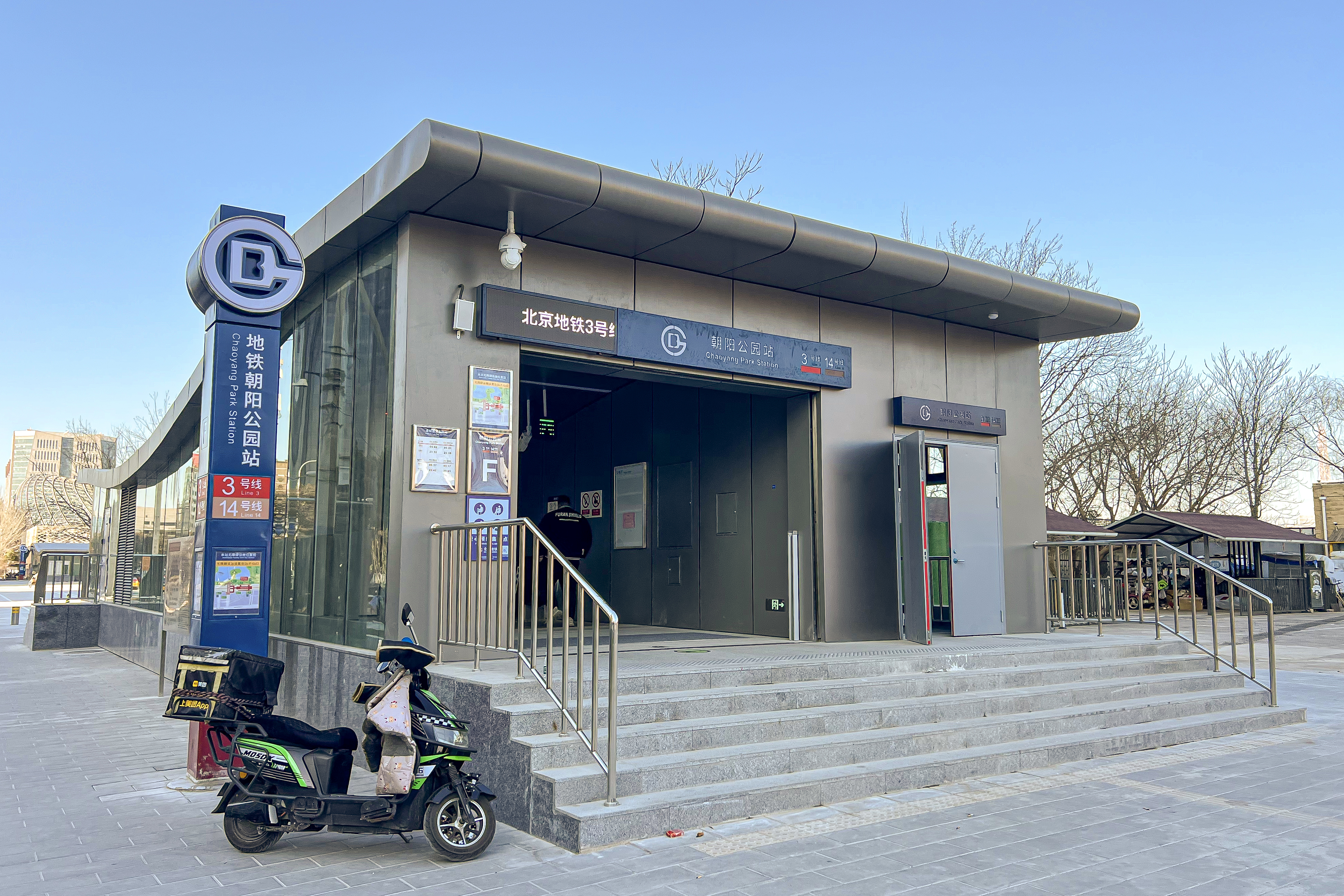
Exit F, Line 3

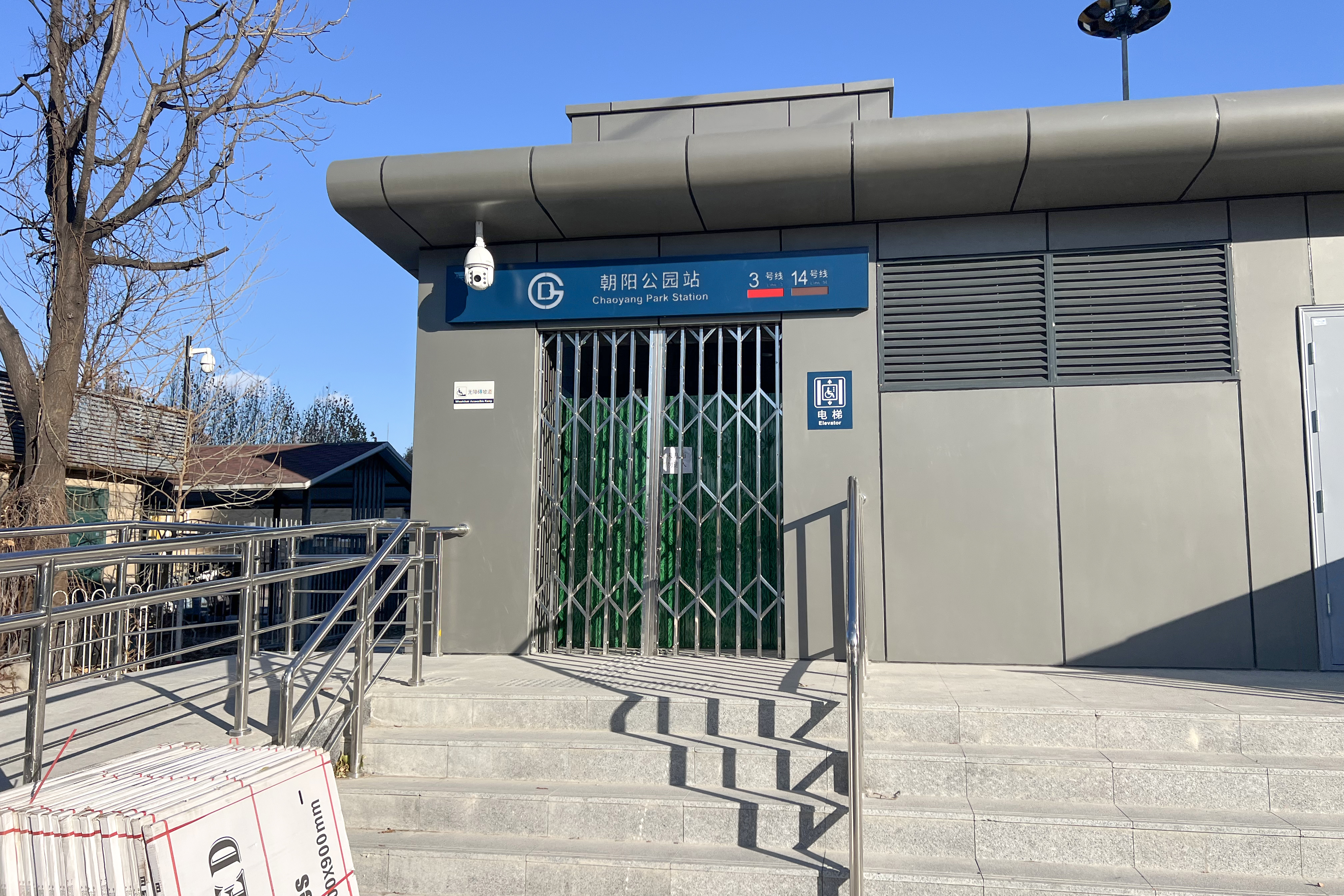
Exit F accessible exit

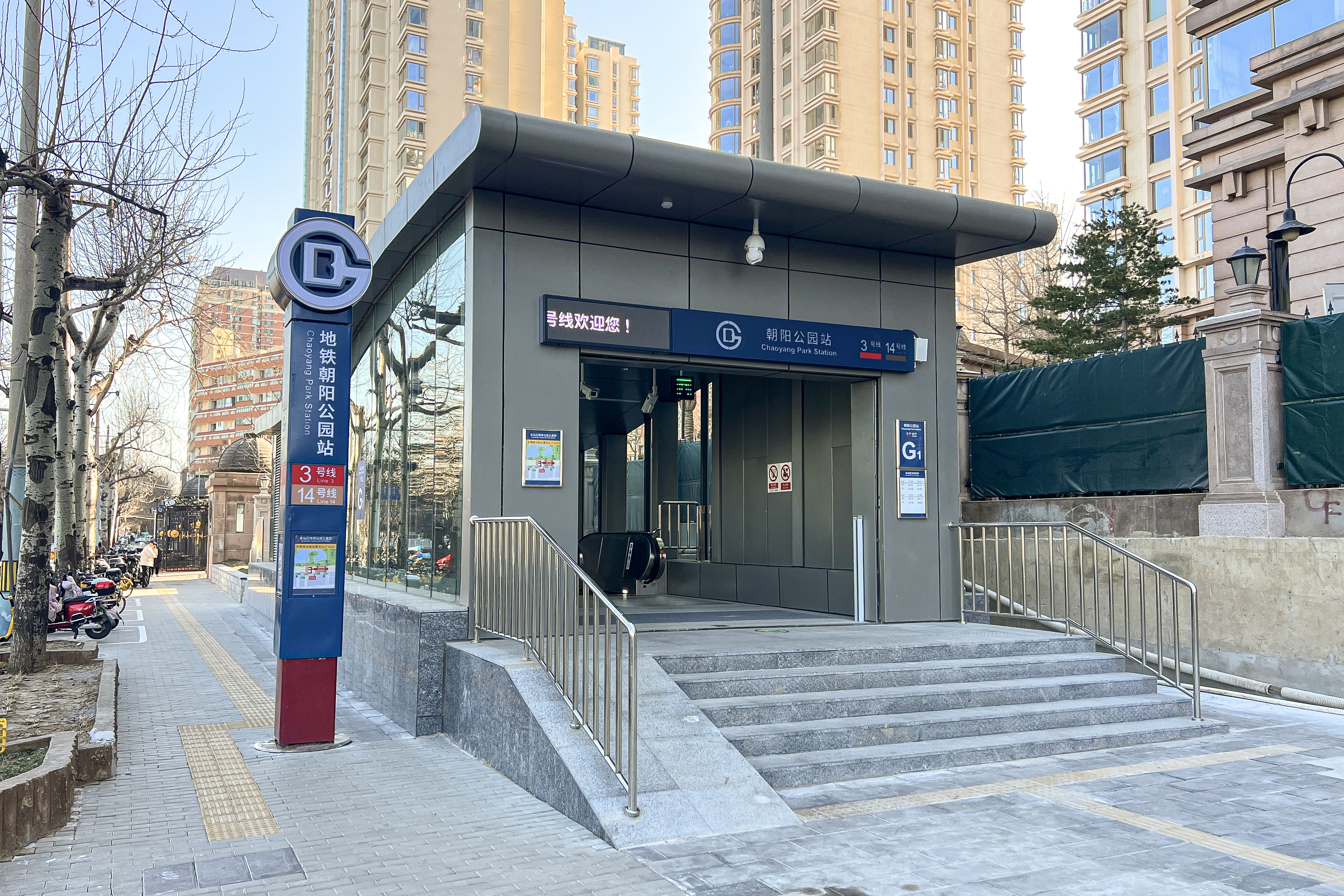
Exit G1, Line 3

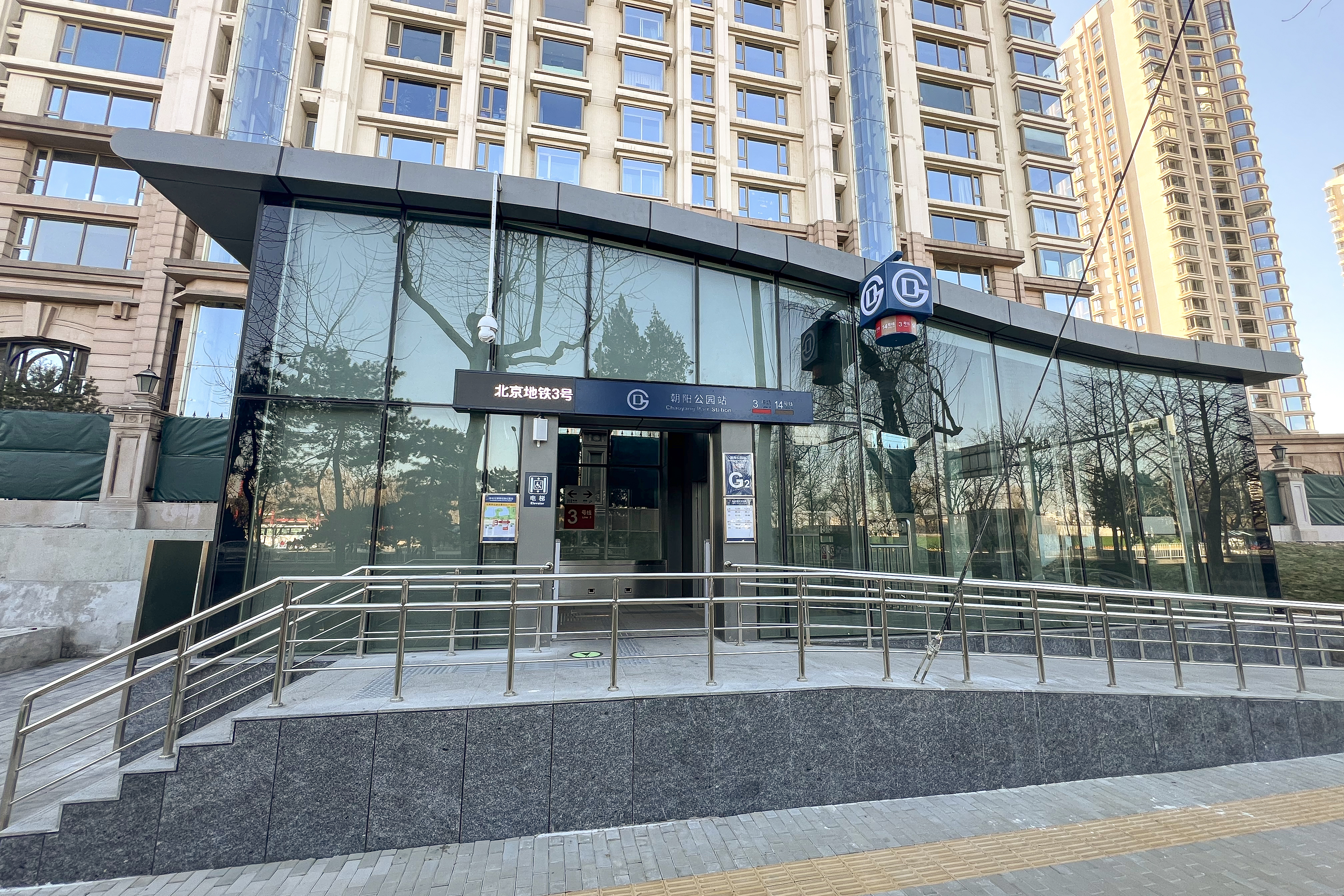
Exit G2, Line 3

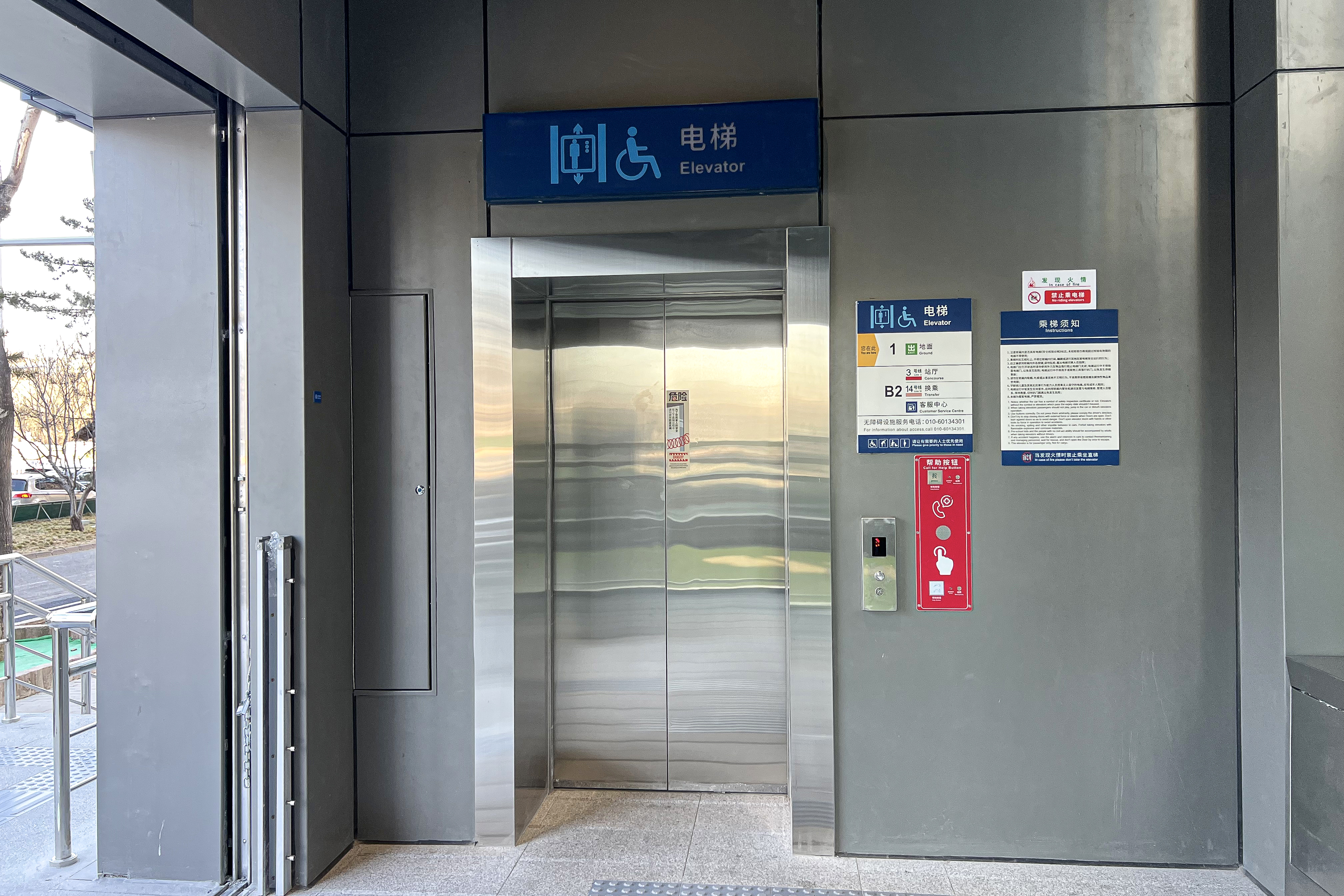
Exit G2 accessible exit

== Gallery ==
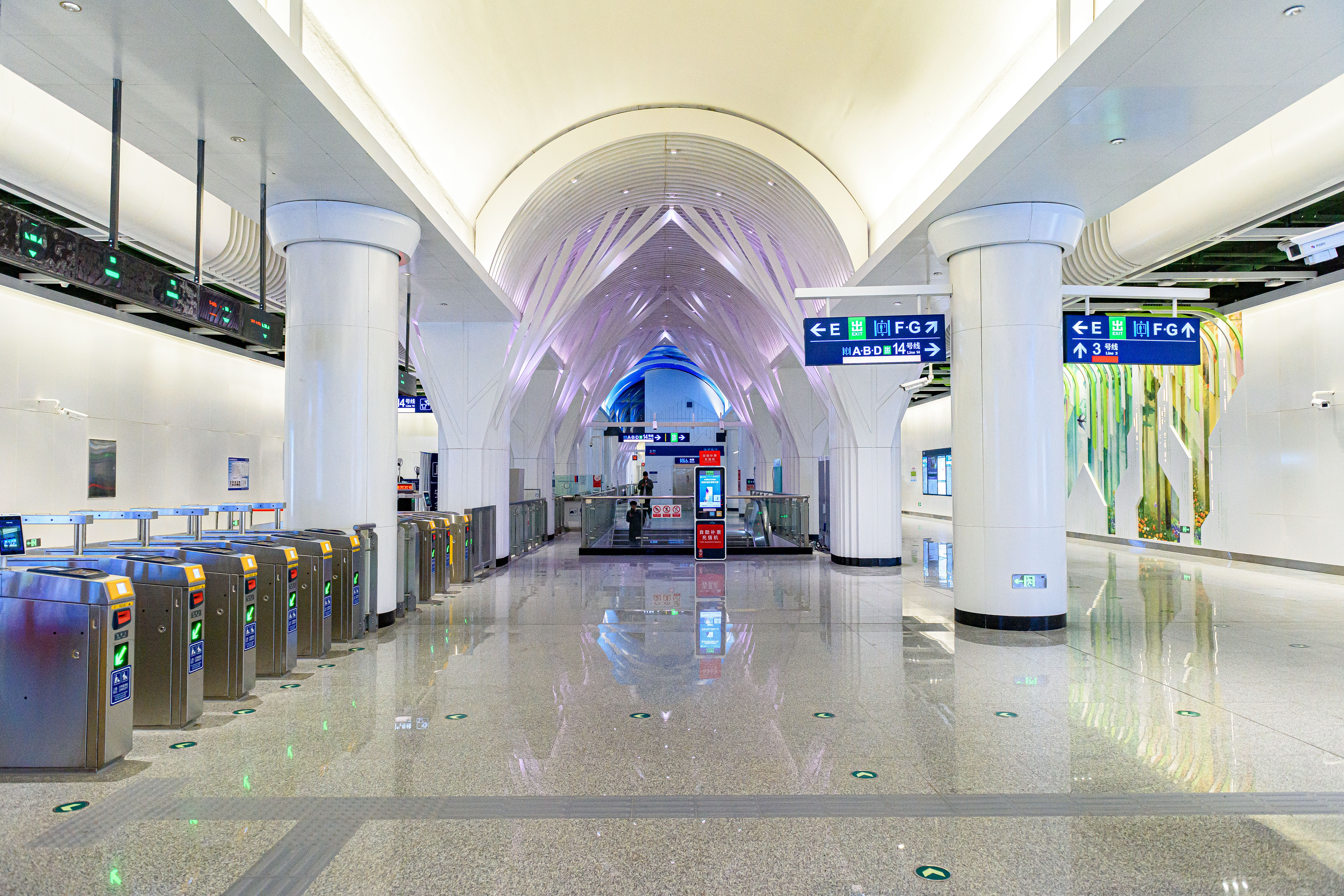
Line 3's concourse

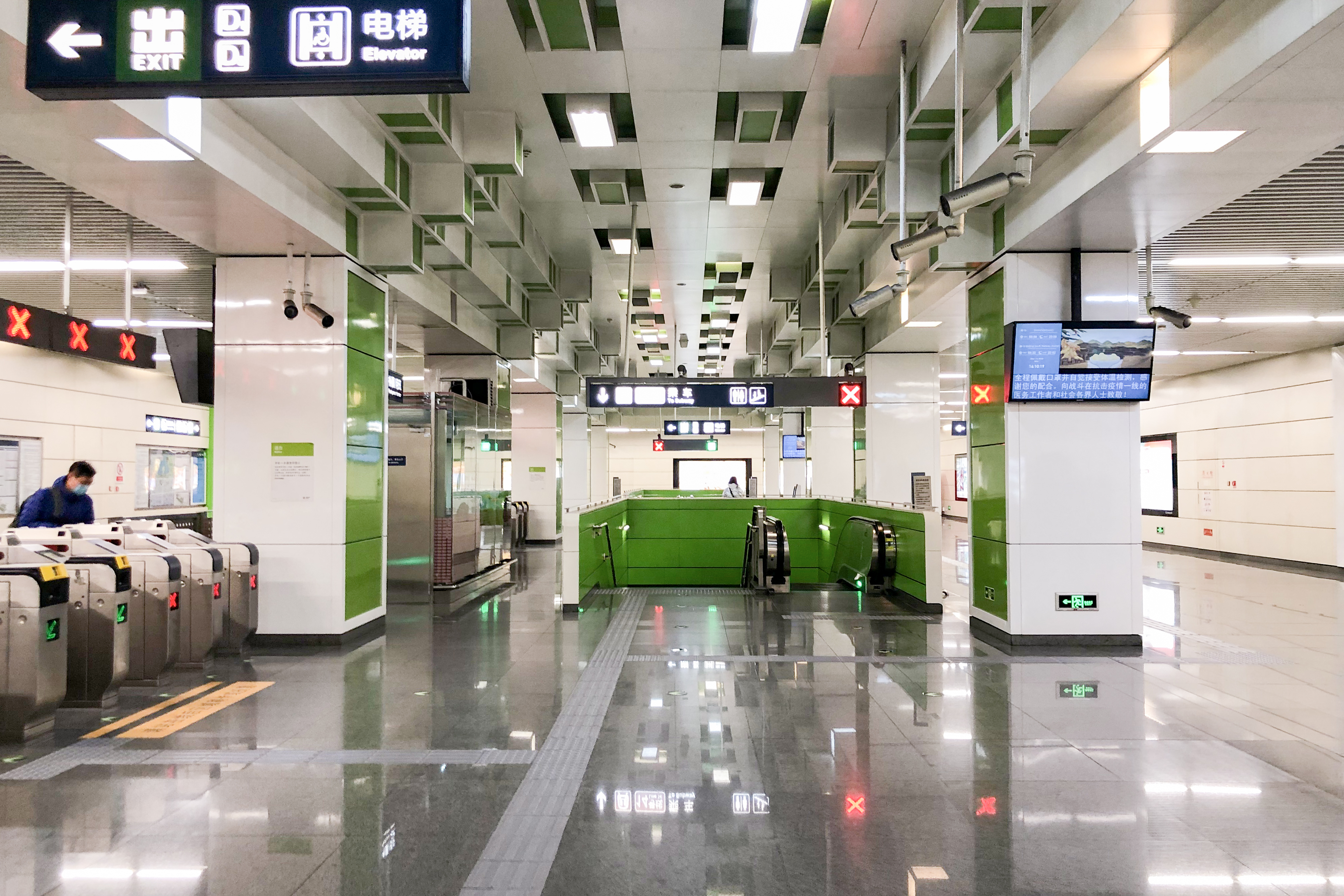
Line 14's south concourse

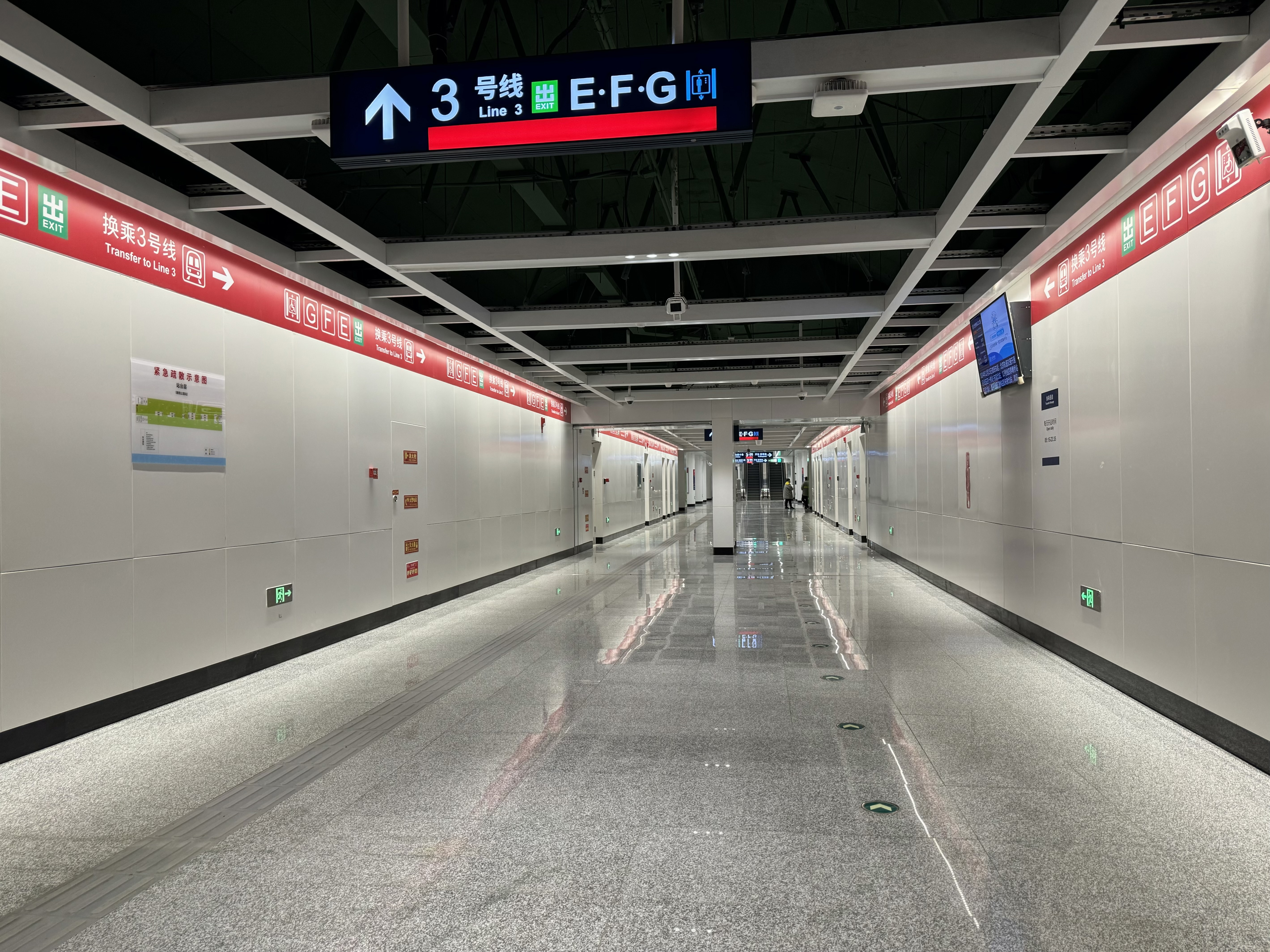
Interchange passage (Line 14 to Line 3)

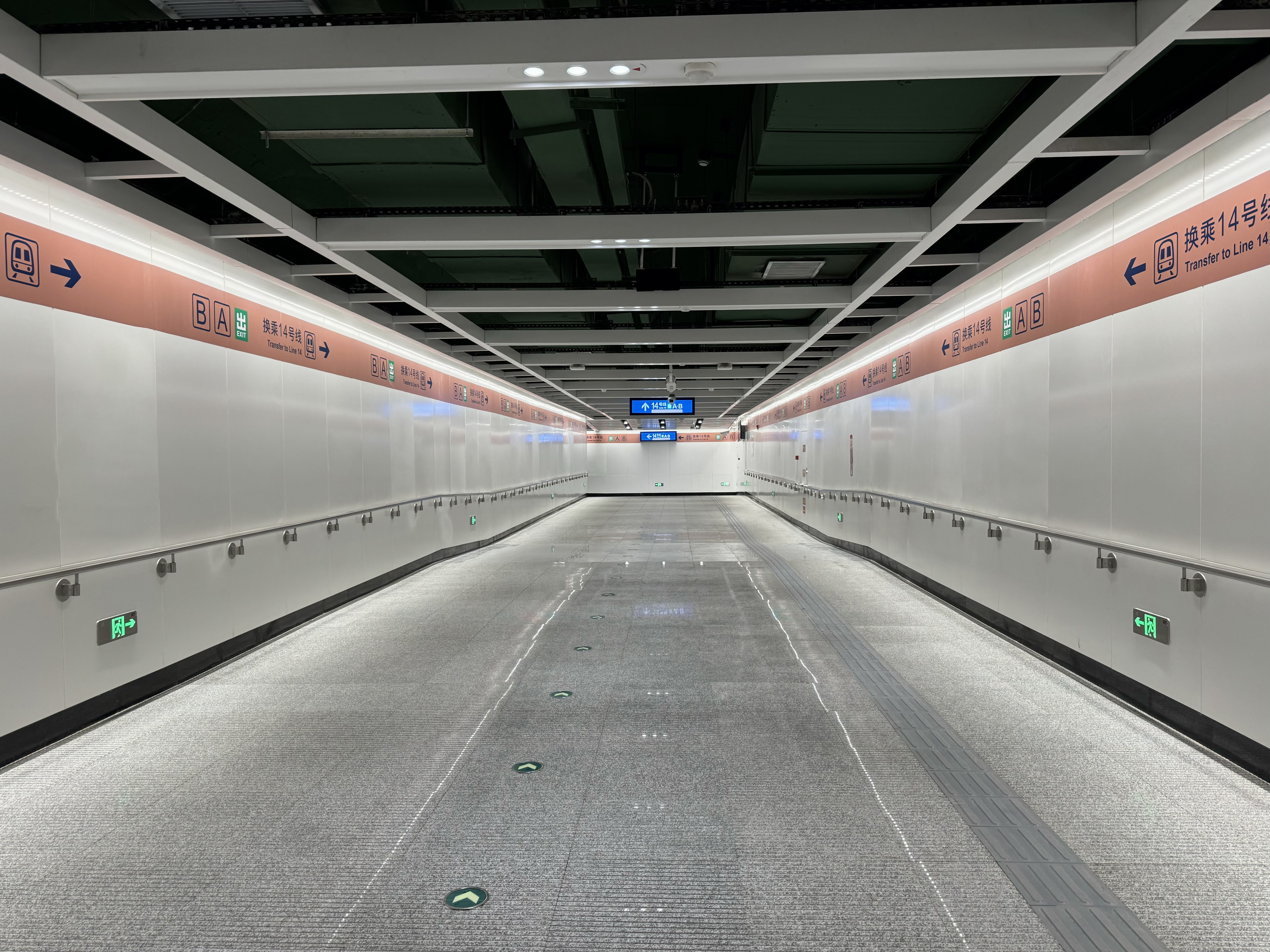
Interchange passage (Line 3 to Line 14)

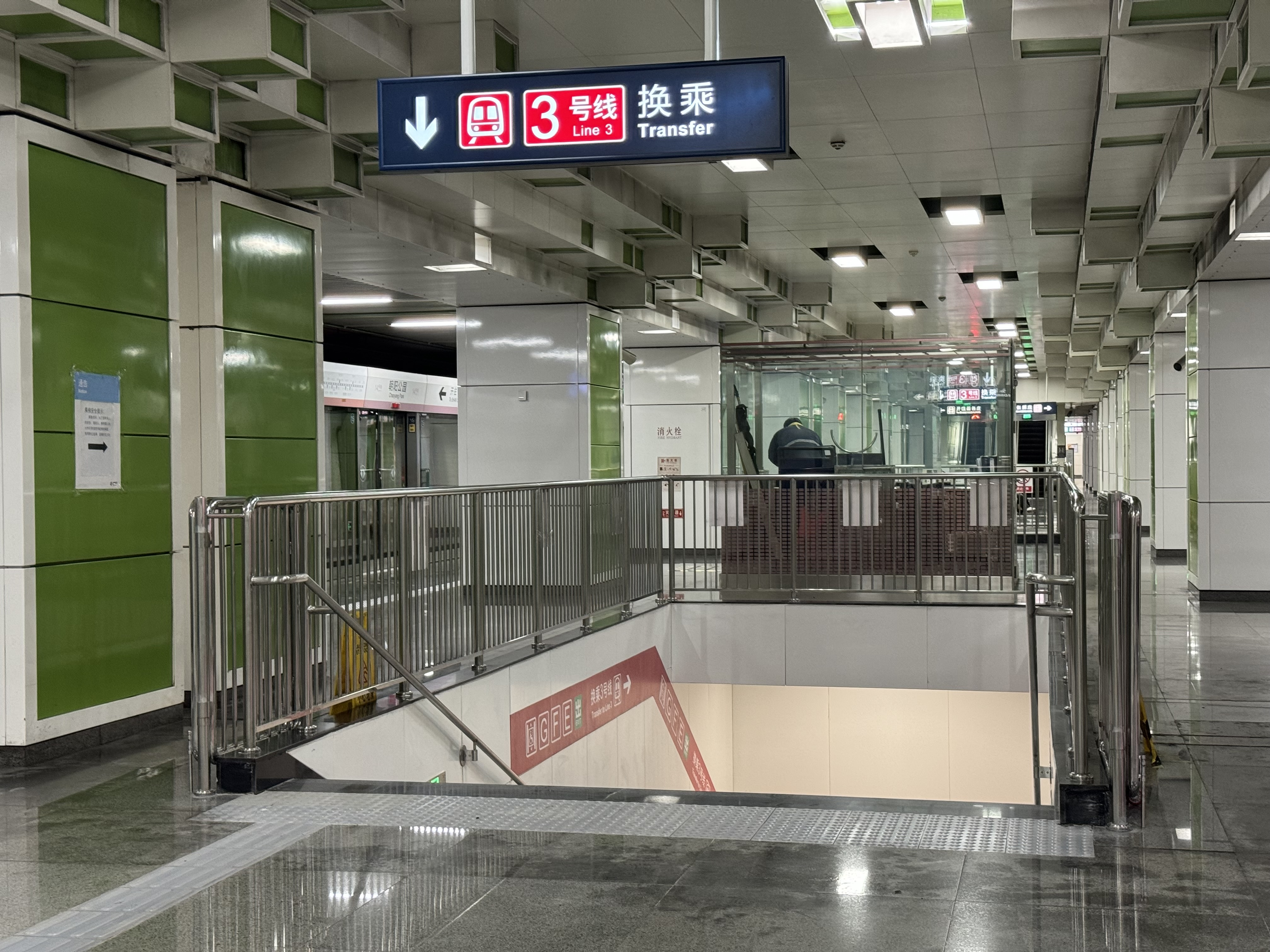
Transfer interface on the platform of Line 14

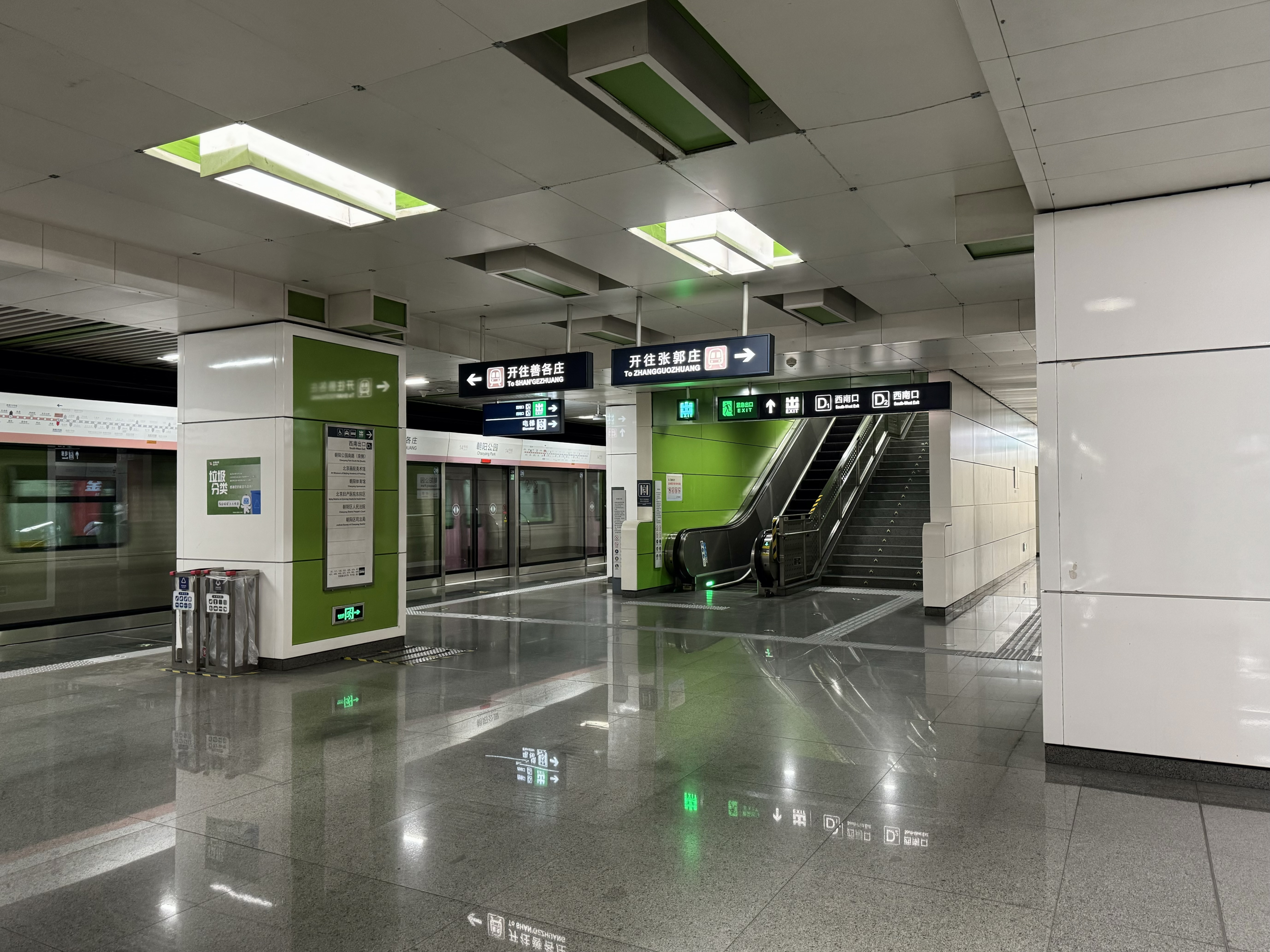
Southern end of Line 14's platform
