= Anjiang railway station =

Railway station in Chengde, China

Anjiang 安匠
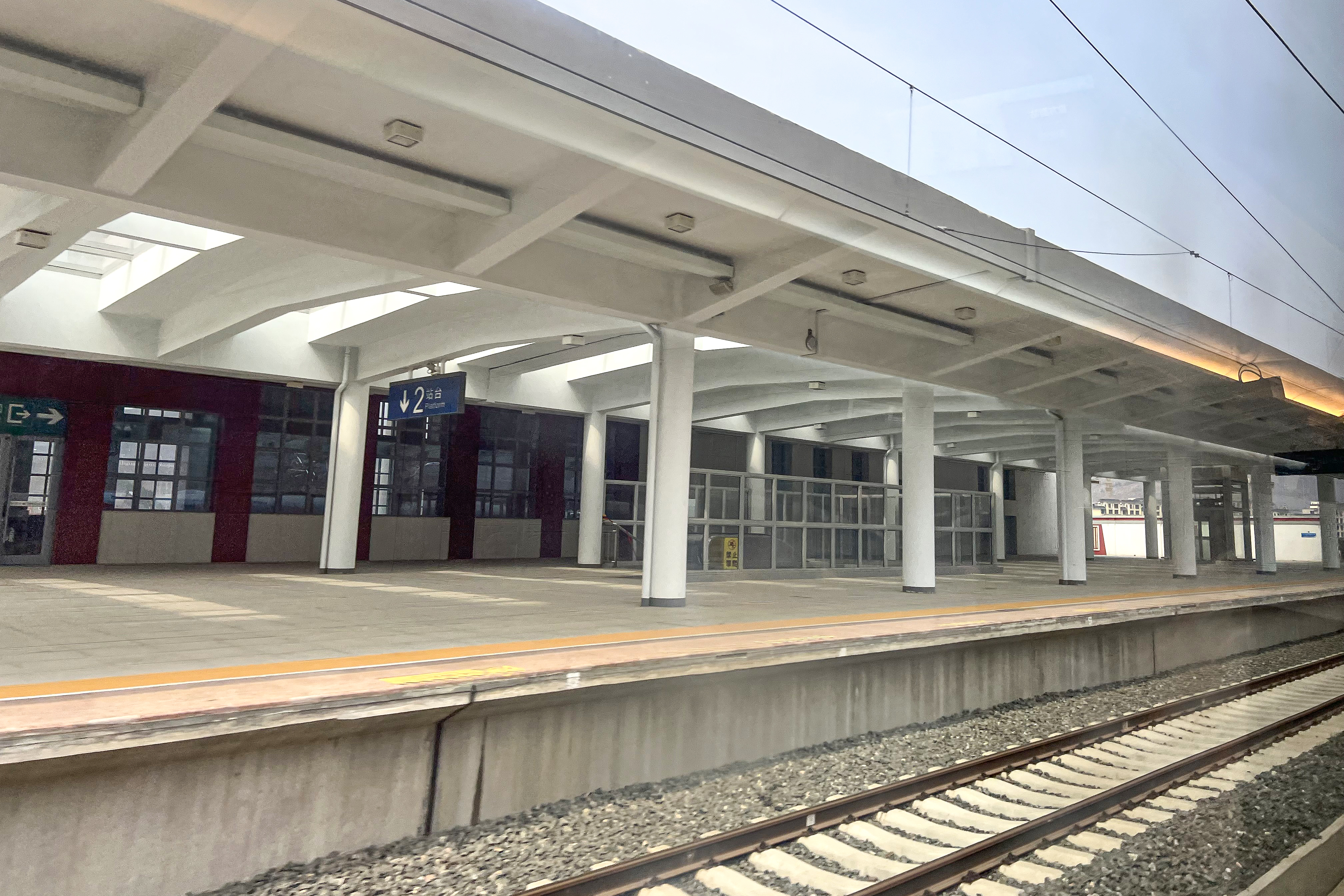

General information
- Location: Chengde County, Chengde, Hebei; China
- Coordinates: 40.762119°N 117.722803°E
- Line: Beijing–Shenyang high-speed railway
- Platforms: 2

Other information
- Station code: MJP (telegram code)

History
- Opened: 22 January 2021
Location

Anjiang railway station (Chinese: 安匠站) is a railway station on the Beijing–Shenyang high-speed railway located in Chengde County, Chengde, Hebei, China. It opened on 22 January 2021.

Preceding station	China Railway High-speed	Following station
Xinglongxian West towards Beijing Chaoyang	Beijing–Harbin high-speed railway	Chengde South towards Harbin
