= Linghai =

Linghai 凌海市
- County-level city
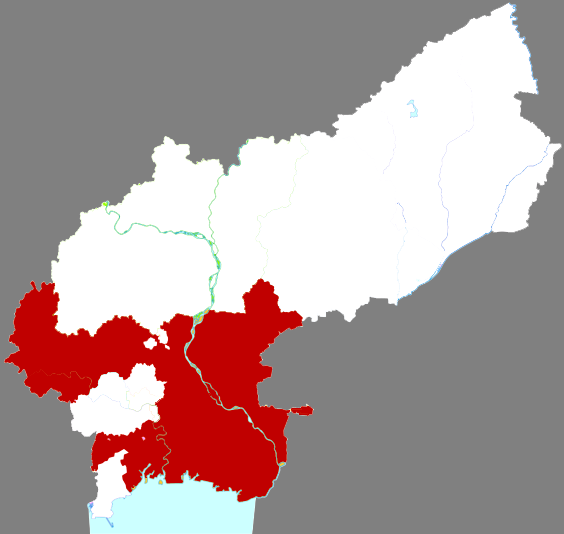
- Location of the city

- Location in Liaoning
- Coordinates: 41°10′N 121°21′E
- Country: People's Republic of China
- Province: Liaoning
- Prefecture-level city: Jinzhou
- City seat: Dalinghe Subdistrict

Area
  - County-level city: 2,585.5 km^{2} (998.3 sq mi)
  - Urban: 136.74 km^{2} (52.80 sq mi)
- Elevation: 19 m (62 ft)

Population (2020)
  - County-level city: 412,513
  - Density: 159.55/km^{2} (413.23/sq mi)
  - Urban: 167,909
- Time zone: UTC+8 (China Standard)
- Postal code: 121200

Linghai (Chinese: 凌海; pinyin: Línghǎi) is a county-level city in the west of Liaoning province, Northeast China. It was called Jinxian or Jin County (Chinese: 锦县) until 1993, when it was reorganized into a county-level city and renamed Linghai. With its urban core lying on the west (right) bank of the Daling River, which flows into Liaodong Bay near the city, it is under the administration of the prefecture-level city of Jinzhou, the seat of which is 21 kilometres (13 mi) to the southwest.

== Administrative divisions ==
There are three subdistricts, 11 towns, seven townships, and one ethnic township under the city's administration.

Subdistricts:

- Dalinghe Subdistrict (大凌河街道), Jincheng Subdistrict (金城街道)

Towns:

- Shishan (石山镇), Yuji (余积镇), Shuangyang (双羊镇), Banjita (班吉塔镇), Shenjiatai (沈家台镇), Santaizi (三台子镇), Youwei Manchu Town (右卫满族镇), Yanjia (闫家镇), Xinzhuangzi (新庄子镇), Niangniangguan (娘娘宫镇), Cuiyan (翠岩镇)

Townships:

- Daye Township (大业乡), Xibaqian Township (西八千乡), Jianye Township (建业乡), Wendilou Manchu Ethnic Township (温滴楼满族乡), Baitaizi Township (白台子乡), Xietun Township (谢屯乡), Antun Township (安屯乡), Banshigou Township (板石沟乡)

Others:

- Dayou Farm (大有农场)

== Climate ==
Climate data for Linghai, elevation 28 m (92 ft), (1991–2020 normals, extremes 1991–present)
| Month | Jan | Feb | Mar | Apr | May | Jun | Jul | Aug | Sep | Oct | Nov | Dec | Year |
|---|---|---|---|---|---|---|---|---|---|---|---|---|---|
| Record high °C (°F) | 8.6 (47.5) | 13.6 (56.5) | 21.1 (70.0) | 30.7 (87.3) | 32.2 (90.0) | 37.5 (99.5) | 37.5 (99.5) | 36.6 (97.9) | 32.0 (89.6) | 29.2 (84.6) | 20.5 (68.9) | 12.7 (54.9) | 37.5 (99.5) |
| Mean daily maximum °C (°F) | −2.7 (27.1) | 1.3 (34.3) | 8.0 (46.4) | 16.2 (61.2) | 23.0 (73.4) | 26.3 (79.3) | 28.5 (83.3) | 28.4 (83.1) | 24.8 (76.6) | 17.1 (62.8) | 6.9 (44.4) | −0.6 (30.9) | 14.8 (58.6) |
| Daily mean °C (°F) | −8.0 (17.6) | −4.2 (24.4) | 2.3 (36.1) | 10.4 (50.7) | 17.3 (63.1) | 21.5 (70.7) | 24.5 (76.1) | 24.0 (75.2) | 19.1 (66.4) | 11.4 (52.5) | 1.8 (35.2) | −5.6 (21.9) | 9.5 (49.2) |
| Mean daily minimum °C (°F) | −12.3 (9.9) | −8.6 (16.5) | −2.3 (27.9) | 5.4 (41.7) | 12.3 (54.1) | 17.4 (63.3) | 21.2 (70.2) | 20.3 (68.5) | 14.3 (57.7) | 6.5 (43.7) | −2.6 (27.3) | −9.8 (14.4) | 5.2 (41.3) |
| Record low °C (°F) | −23.3 (−9.9) | −20.0 (−4.0) | −13.3 (8.1) | −2.2 (28.0) | 3.3 (37.9) | 10.7 (51.3) | 14.2 (57.6) | 10.5 (50.9) | 3.4 (38.1) | −6.3 (20.7) | −15.9 (3.4) | −20.0 (−4.0) | −23.3 (−9.9) |
| Average precipitation mm (inches) | 3.0 (0.12) | 3.9 (0.15) | 9.0 (0.35) | 26.3 (1.04) | 48.9 (1.93) | 90.7 (3.57) | 146 (5.7) | 151.5 (5.96) | 39.9 (1.57) | 33.5 (1.32) | 16.0 (0.63) | 3.9 (0.15) | 572.6 (22.49) |
| Average precipitation days (≥ 0.1 mm) | 1.9 | 2.2 | 2.8 | 4.9 | 7.4 | 11.2 | 10.7 | 9.2 | 6.0 | 5.1 | 3.7 | 1.9 | 67 |
| Average snowy days | 2.9 | 2.7 | 2.5 | 0.9 | 0 | 0 | 0 | 0 | 0 | 0.3 | 2.7 | 3.0 | 15 |
| Average relative humidity (%) | 50 | 50 | 48 | 50 | 56 | 71 | 81 | 80 | 68 | 59 | 54 | 52 | 60 |
| Mean monthly sunshine hours | 207.2 | 209.2 | 251.2 | 251.1 | 276.7 | 235.4 | 209.4 | 230.4 | 240.6 | 226.9 | 192.3 | 192.5 | 2,722.9 |
| Percentage possible sunshine | 70 | 69 | 67 | 63 | 62 | 52 | 46 | 54 | 65 | 67 | 66 | 68 | 62 |
Source: China Meteorological Administrationall-time August highOctober all-time Record

== Transportation ==
=== Railway ===
Linghai is served by Linghai South railway station, an infill station on the Qinhuangdao–Shenyang passenger railway and the southern terminus of the Chaoyang–Linghai high-speed railway.

=== Airport ===
Jinzhou Bay Airport is located here.

== Notable people ==
- Wang Dianzuo, mineral scientist
- Xiao Jun, author
- Zhao Yanxia, opera singer
