= Liaoning Chaoyang railway station =

Railway station in Chaoyang, Liaoning, China

Liaoning Chaoyang 辽宁朝阳
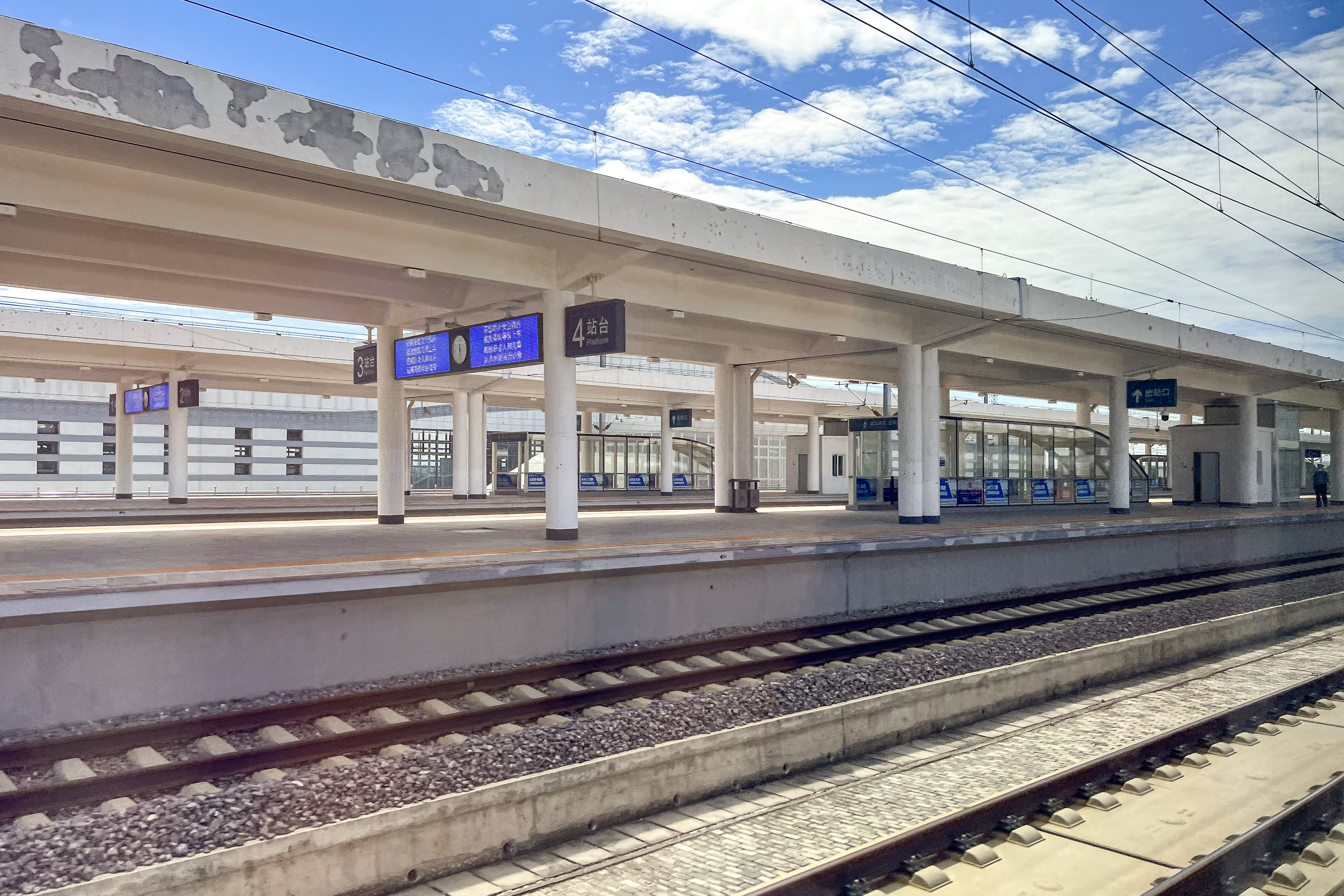

General information
- Other names: Chaoyang North
- Location: Qidaoquanzi, Longcheng District, Chaoyang, Liaoning; China
- Coordinates: 41.597902°N 120.403860°E
- Line(s): Beijing–Shenyang high-speed railway; Chaoyang–Linghai high-speed railway

Other information
- Station code: TMIS code: 67043; Telegraph code: VET; Pinyin code: LNY

History
- Opened: 29 December 2018

Liaoning Chaoyang railway station (pinyin: Liáoníng Cháoyáng zhàn) is a station on Beijing–Shenyang high-speed railway and Chaoyang–Linghai high-speed railway. It is located in Longcheng District, Chaoyang, Liaoning Province, People's Republic of China.

Preceding station	China Railway High-speed	Following station
Nailingao towards Beijing	Beijing–Shenyang high-speed railway	Beipiao towards Shenyang
Terminus	Chaoyang–Linghai high-speed railway	Batuying towards Linghai South
