= Xinglongxian West railway station =

Railway station in Xinglong County, Chengde

Coordinates: 40.412876°N 117.475427°E

Xinglongxian West 兴隆县西
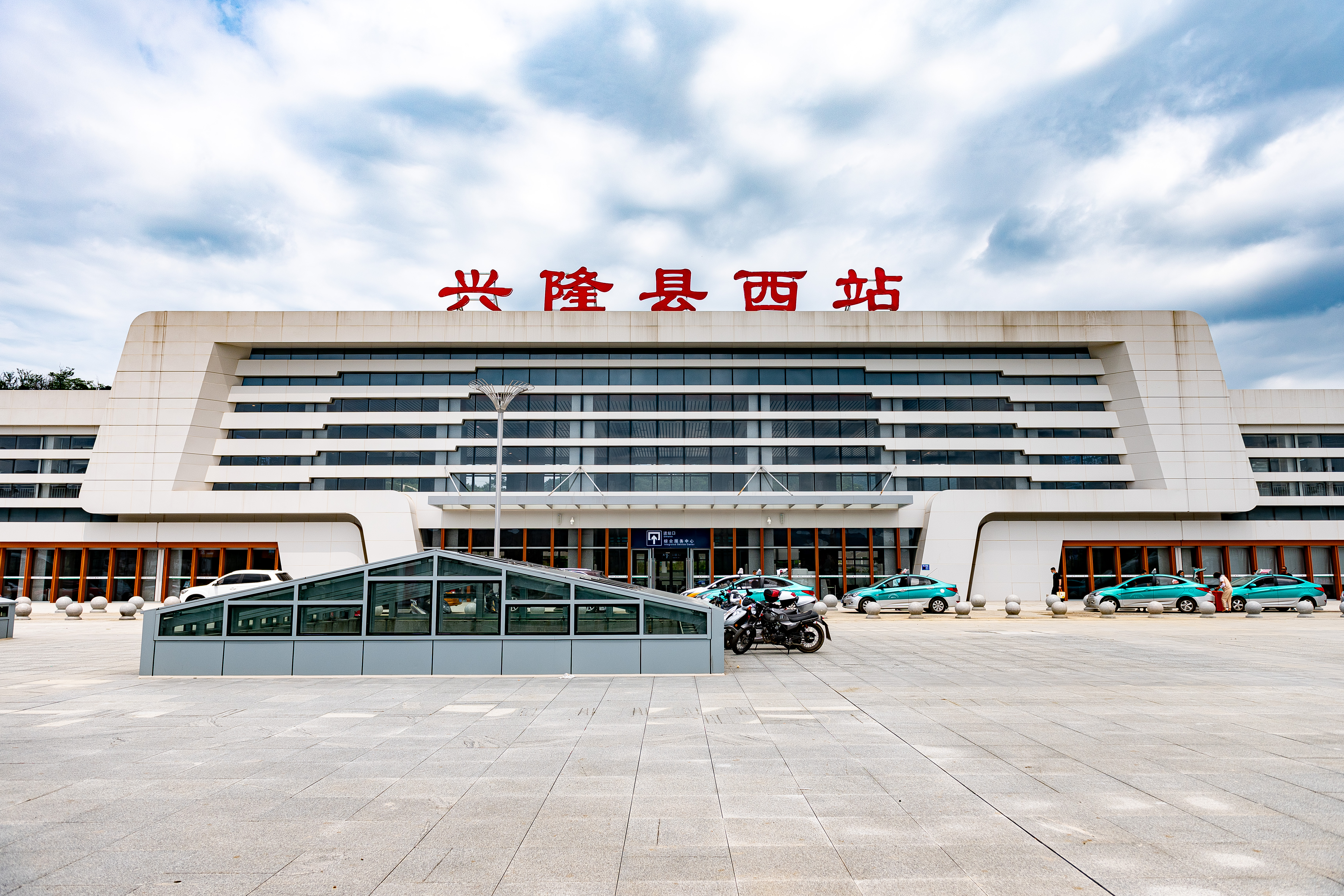
- Station building

General information
- Location: Xinglong County, Chengde, Hebei
- Line: Beijing–Shenyang high-speed railway
- Platforms: 2 side platforms

Construction
- Structure type: Elevated (railway)

Other information
- Station code: 11397 (TMIS)

History
- Opened: 22 January 2021
- Former names: Xinglong West
Location

Xinglongxian West railway station (Chinese: 兴隆县西站; pinyin: Xīnglóngxiàn Xī Zhàn; lit. 'Xinglong County West railway station') is a railway station of Beijing–Shenyang high-speed railway located in Xinglong County, Chengde, Hebei province, People's Republic of China. It was opened on 22 January 2021.

== History ==
Station construction began in October 2017, under the name of Xinglong West station. The main station structure was completed on 1 November 2018, while station furnishings were completed in October 2019. The station was renamed Xinglongxian West station in September 2020, and track-laying was complete on 24 September 2020. The station opened on 22 January 2021, as part of the completion of the Beijing–Shenyang high-speed railway.

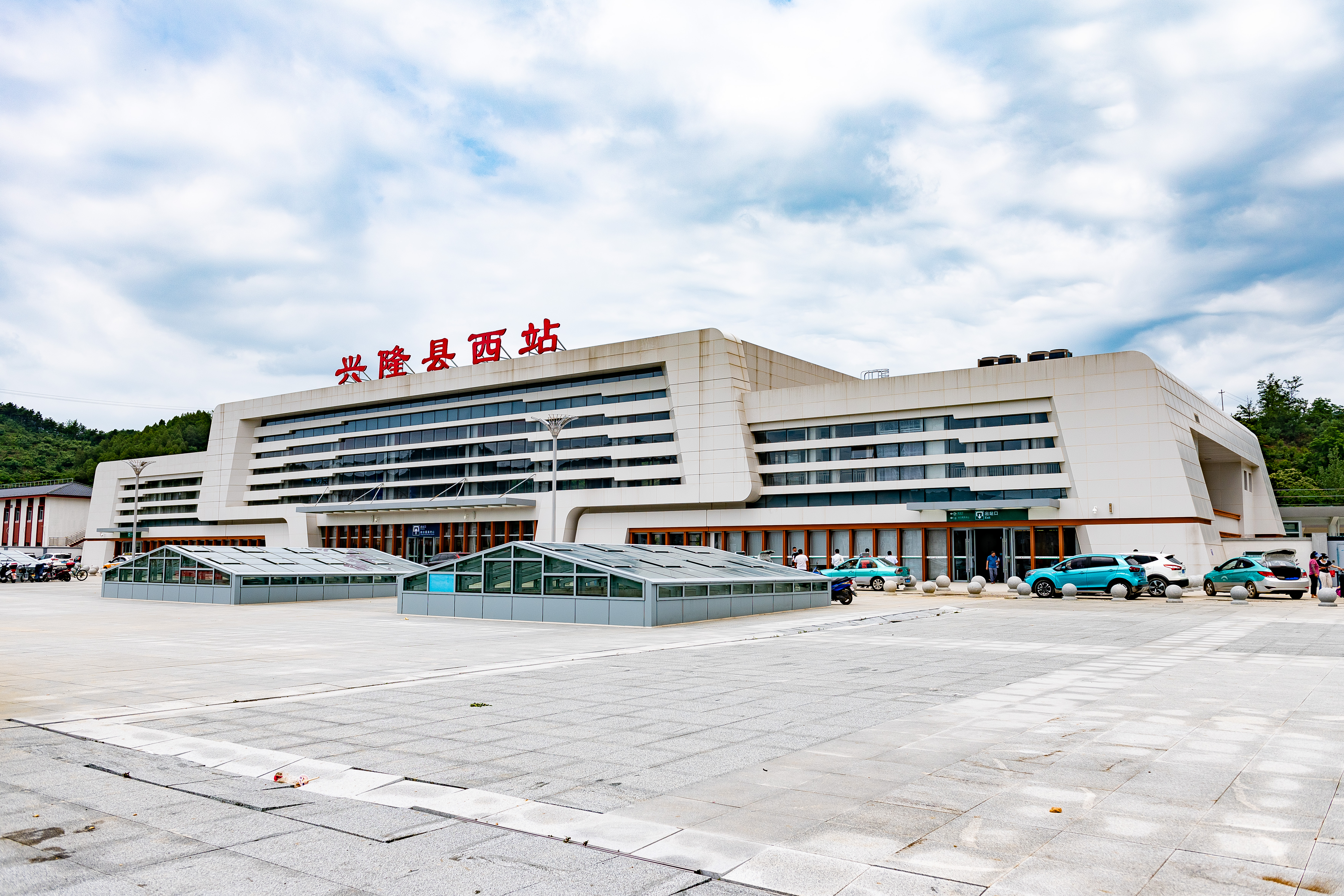
Station exterior

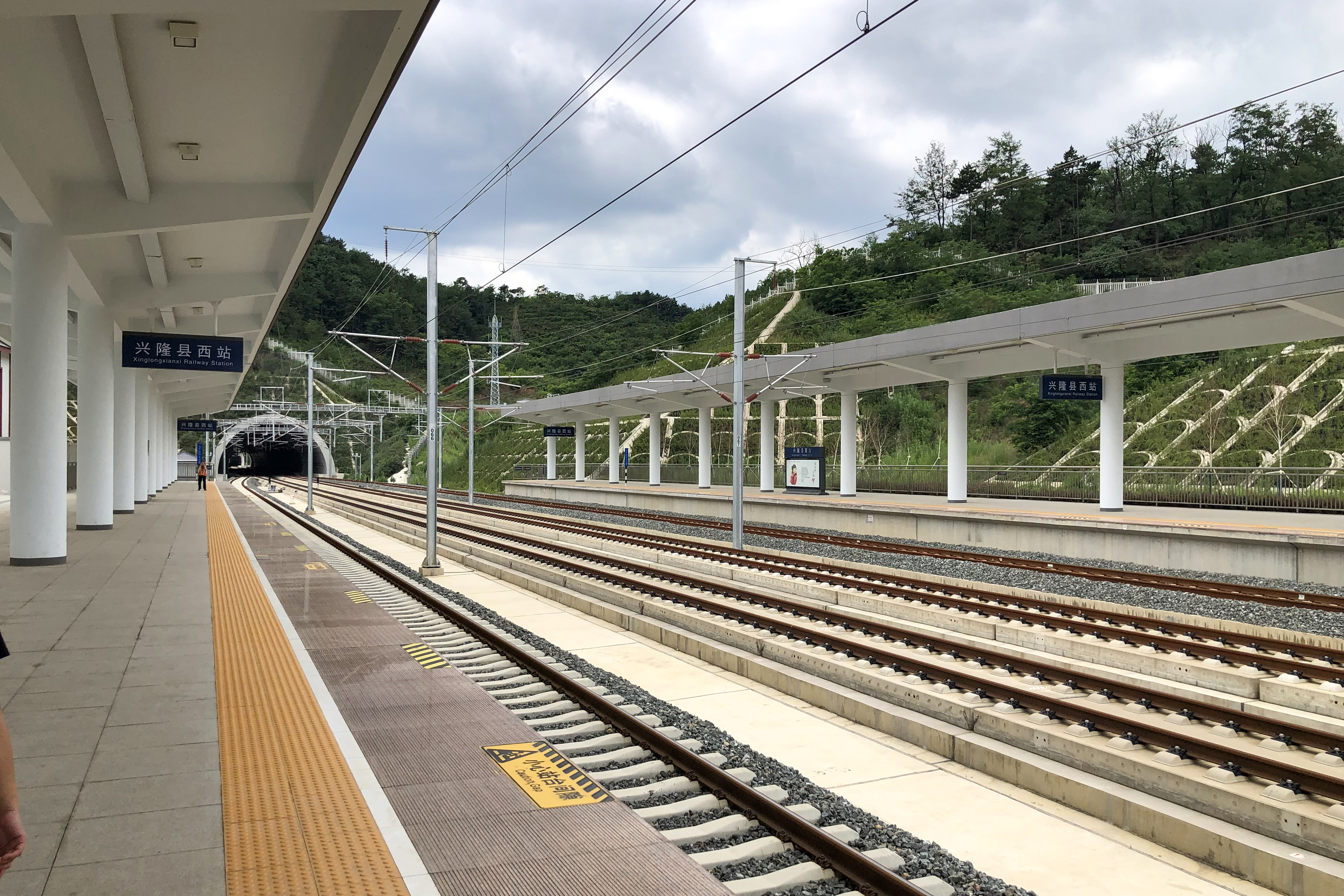
Platform

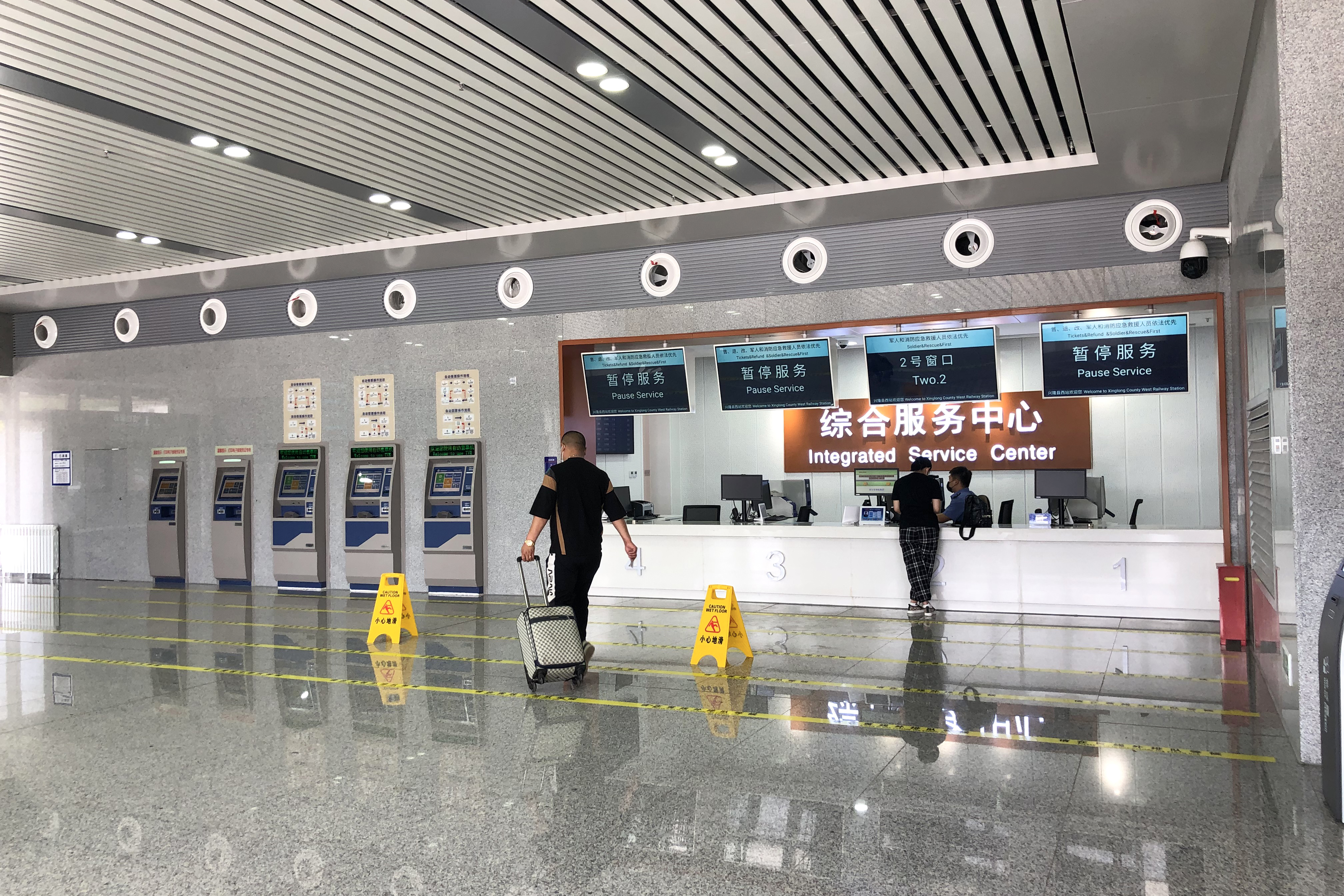
Ticket office

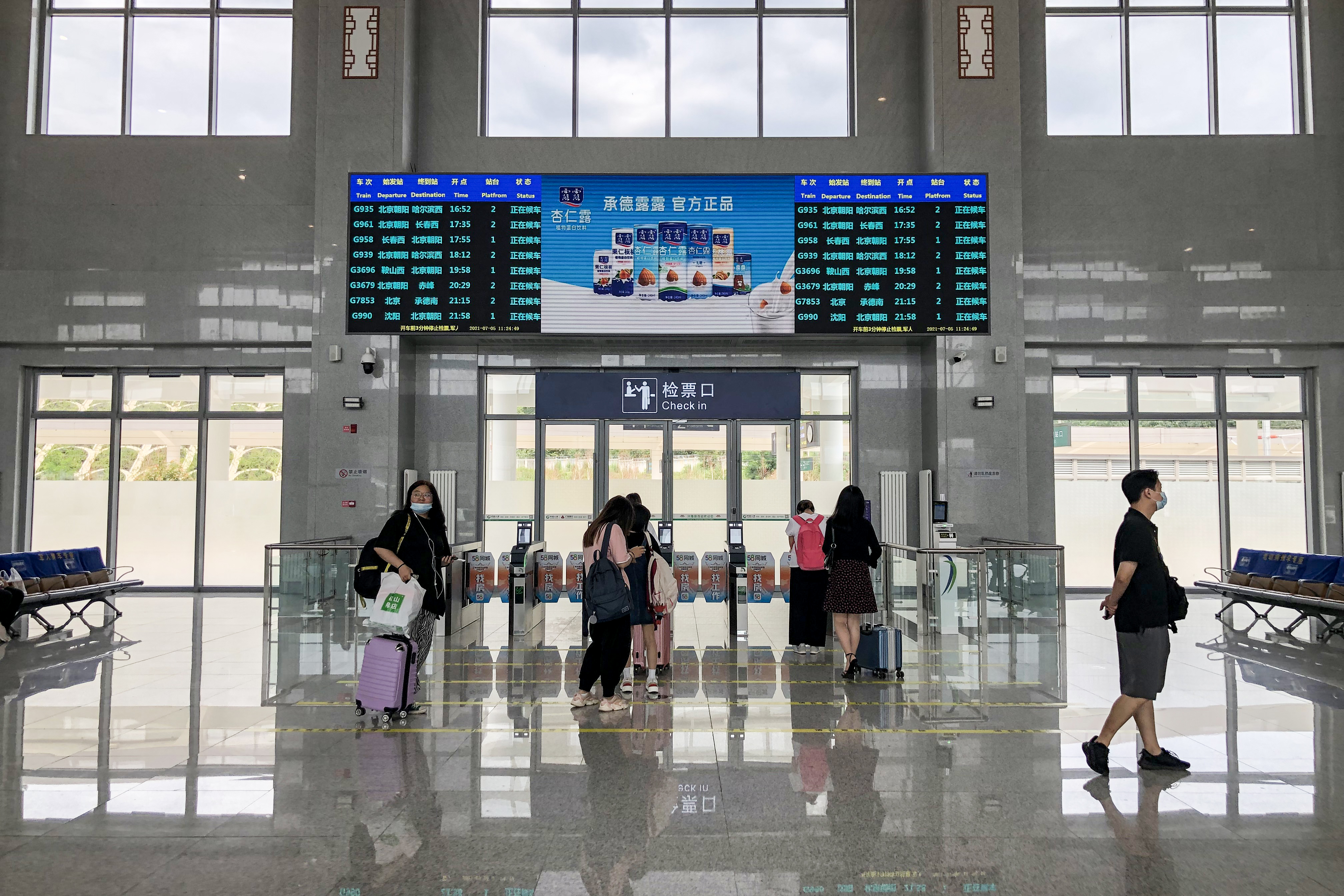
Boarding gates

Preceding station	China Railway High-speed	Following station
Miyun towards Beijing Chaoyang	Beijing–Harbin high-speed railway	Anjiang towards Harbin
