= Niuheliang railway station =

Railway station in Lingyuan, China

Niuheliang 牛河梁
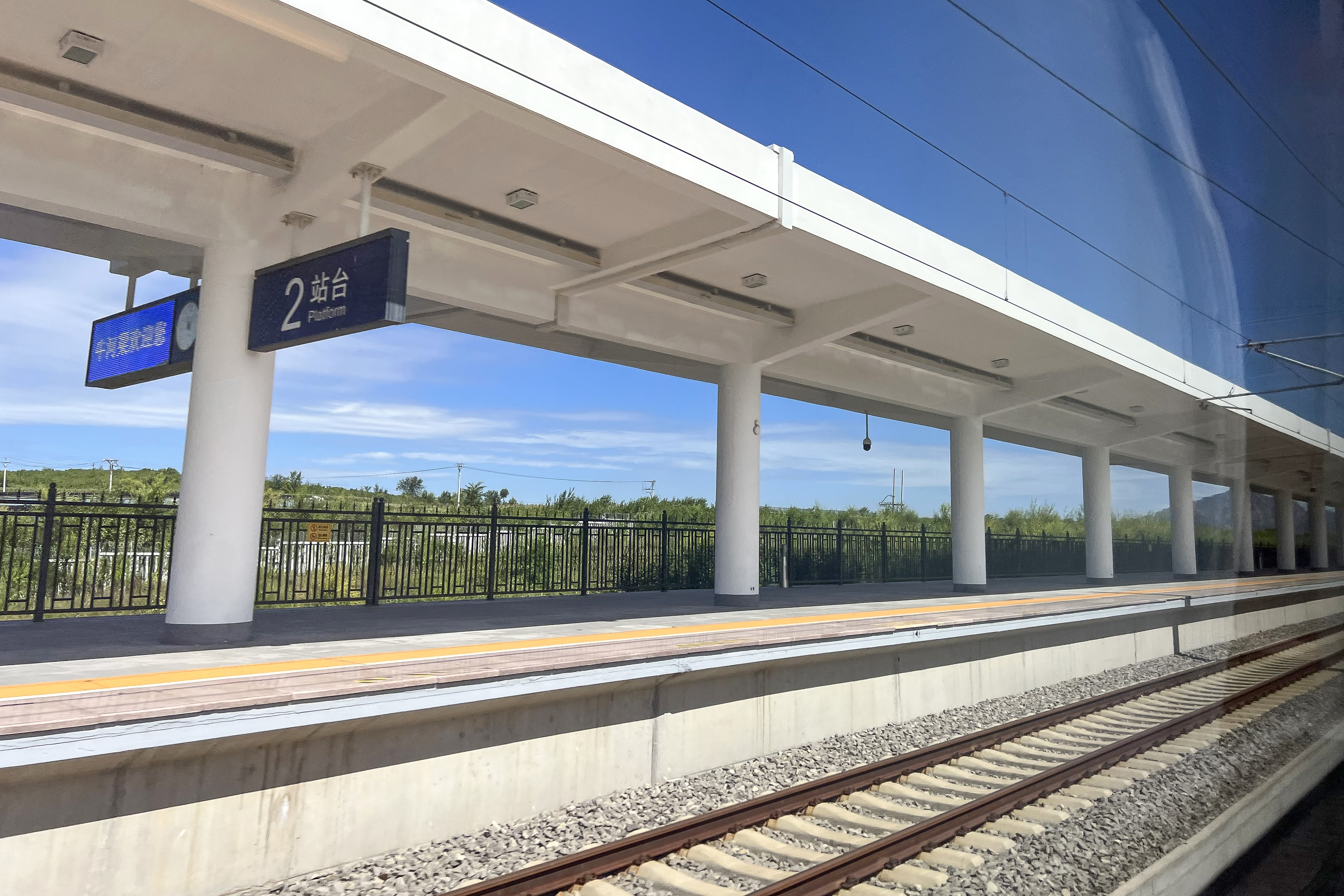
- Platform 2

General information
- Other names: Lingyuan South
- Location: Machang Village, Chengguan Subdistrict, Lingyuan, Chaoyang, Liaoning; China
- Coordinates: 41.193936°N 119.392460°E
- Line: Beijing–Shenyang High-Speed Railway

Other information
- Station code: TMIS: 67049; Telegraph: LKT; Pinyin: NHL

History
- Opened: 29 December 2018
Location

The Niuheliang railway station is a railway station of Jingshen Passenger Railway that is located in Machang Village, Chengguan Subdistrict, Lingyuan, Chaoyang, Liaoning, People's Republic of China. The station was designed by Fu Pengfei, inspired by 'blooming lilies'.

It is a bordering station of China Railway Shenyang Group, while its neighbour Pingquan North railway station belongs to China Railway Beijing Group.

Preceding station	China Railway High-speed	Following station
Pingquan North towards Beijing	Beijing–Shenyang high-speed railway	Kazuo towards Shenyang
