= Wang Dianzuo =

Chinese mineral scientist

- 王淀佐
- Born: 23 March 1934; Jin County, Jinzhou Province, Manchukuo
- Died: 25 October 2023 (aged 89); Beijing, China
- Education: Central South University
- Scientific career
- Fields: Mineral engineering
- Workplaces: Central South University

Wang Dianzuo (Chinese: 王淀佐; pinyin: Wáng Diànzuǒ; 23 March 1934 – 25 October 2023) was a Chinese mineral scientist who was president of Central South University of Technology (now Central South University), and members of the Chinese Academy of Sciences and Chinese Academy of Engineering. He was a foreign associate of the National Academy of Engineering and foreign member of the Russian Academy of Sciences.

He was a member of the 8th, 9th, 10th National Committee of the Chinese People's Political Consultative Conference.

== Biography ==
Wang was born in Jin County, Jinzhou Province (now Linghai, Liaoning), Manchukuo, on 23 March 1934. In 1949, he was accepted to the Political Science College of Northeastern University in Changchun. After studying for six months, he was despatched to work at the Nonferrous Metals Industry Management Bureau. After short-term technical training, he became a technician and participated in technical work in the Beneficiation Department. In 1950, he was a technician in the Mineral Processing Department of the Mining Department of the Northeast Nonferrous Metals Bureau. Two years later, he was transferred to the Nonferrous Metals Bureau of the Ministry of Heavy Industry and worked as a technician in the Production Department. He joined the Chinese Communist Party (CCP) in August 1956. In 1961, he graduated from the Central South University of Mining and Metallurgy (now Central South University).

After university, he stayed at the university and worked successively as teaching assistant, lecturer, associate professor, and professor. He rose to become president of the university in 1985.

Starting from December 1991, he successively served as president of Beijing Nonferrous Metals Research Institute, senior advisor of Science and Technology to the General Manager of China Nonferrous Metals Industry Corporation, and honorary president of Beijing Nonferrous Metals Research Institute.

In June 1986 he was promoted to become vice president of the Chinese Academy of Engineering, a position he held until June 2006.

On 25 October 2023, he died from an illness in Beijing, at the age of 89.

== Honours and awards ==
- 1990 Foreign Associate of the National Academy of Engineering (NAE)
- 1991 Member of the Chinese Academy of Sciences (CAS)
- 1994 Science and Technology Progress Award of the Ho Leung Ho Lee Foundation
- 1994 Member of the Chinese Academy of Engineering (CAE)
- 2000 State Science and Technology Progress Award (First Class) for the Theory and Practice of Potential Controlled Flotation of Sulfide Ore.
- 2006 Foreign Member of the Russian Academy of Sciences (RAS)
