= Shunyi West railway station =

Railway station in Beijing, China

Shunyixi 顺义西
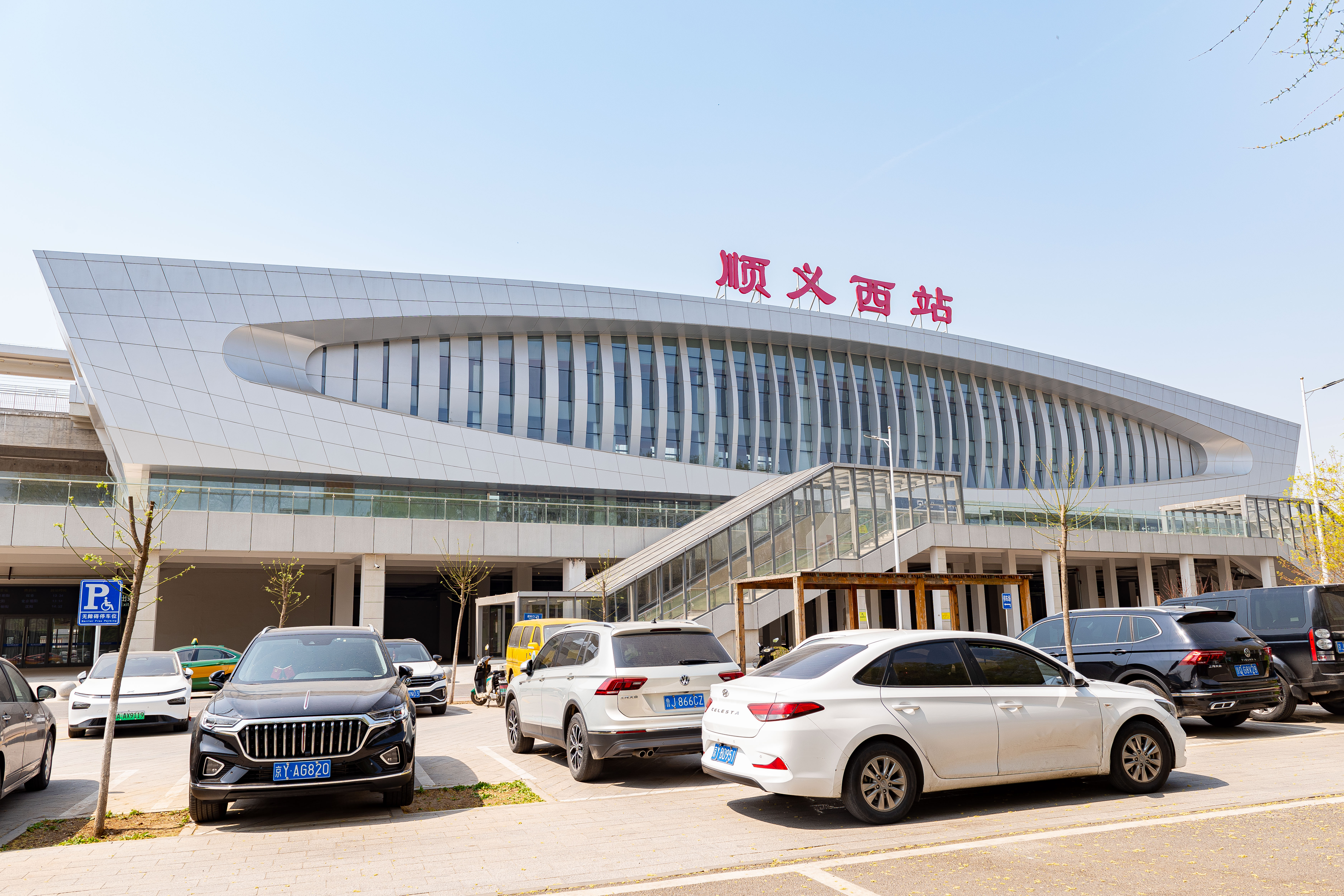
- Shunyi West railway station in April 2024

General information
- Location: Gaoliying, Shunyi, Beijing
- Coordinates: 40.177882°N 116.485049°E
- Operated by: China Railway Beijing Group
- Line: Beijing–Shenyang high-speed railway
- Platforms: 2 side platforms

Construction
- Structure type: Elevated (railway)

Other information
- Station code: IKP (telegram code); SYX (pinyin code)

History
- Opened: January 22, 2021

Services
Preceding station	China Railway High-speed	Following station
Beijing Chaoyang towards Beijing	Beijing–Shenyang high-speed railway Part of the Beijing–Harbin high-speed railway	Huairou South towards Shenyang
Location

Shunyi West railway station (Chinese: 顺义西站; pinyin: Shùnyì Xī Zhàn) is a railway station that is a part of the Beijing–Shenyang high-speed railway located in Shunyi, Beijing, China. It was opened on 22 January 2021.
