= Kazuo railway station =

Railway station in Chaoyang, Liaoning, China

Kazuo 喀左
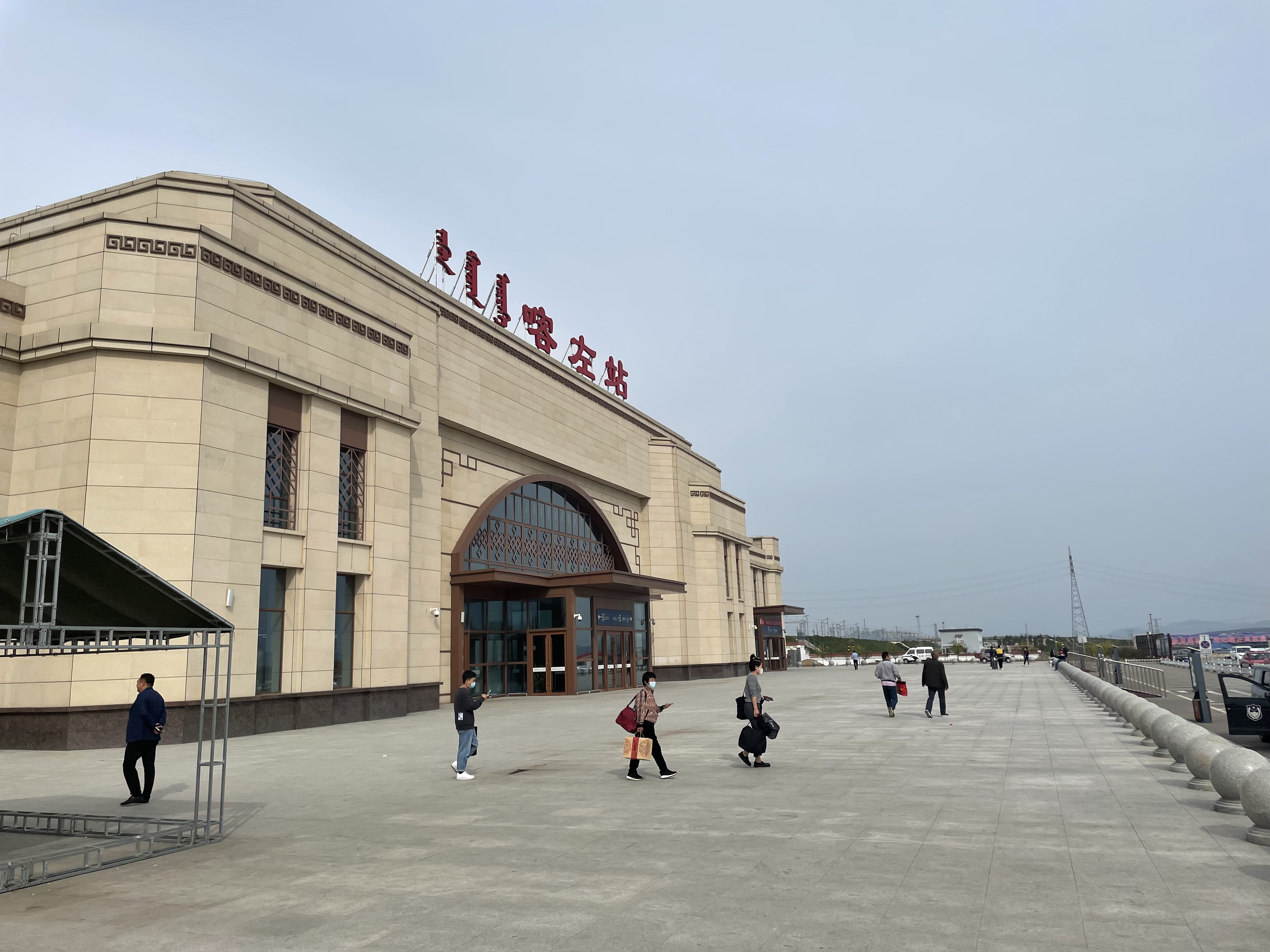

General information
- Location: Jinzhangzitun, Banlashaoguo Village, Xinglongzhuang Town, Harqin Zuoyi Mongol Autonomous County, Chaoyang, Liaoning; China
- Coordinates: 41.222351°N 119.799874°E
- Line: Beijing–Shenyang High-Speed Railway

Other information
- Station code: TMIS code: 67047; Telegraph code: KZT; Pinyin code: KZU

History
- Opened: 29 December 2018
Location

Kazuo railway station (Chinese: 喀左站, Mongolian: ᠵᠡᠭᠦᠨ
ᠬᠠᠷᠠᠴᠢᠨ
ᠥᠷᠲᠡᠭᠡ) is a railway station of Jingshen Passenger Railway in Harqin Zuoyi Mongol Autonomous County, Chaoyang, Liaoning, People's Republic of China.

Preceding station	China Railway High-speed	Following station
Niuheliang towards Beijing	Beijing–Shenyang high-speed railway	Nailingao towards Shenyang
