= Beipiao railway station =

Railway station in Chaoyang, China

Beipiao 北票
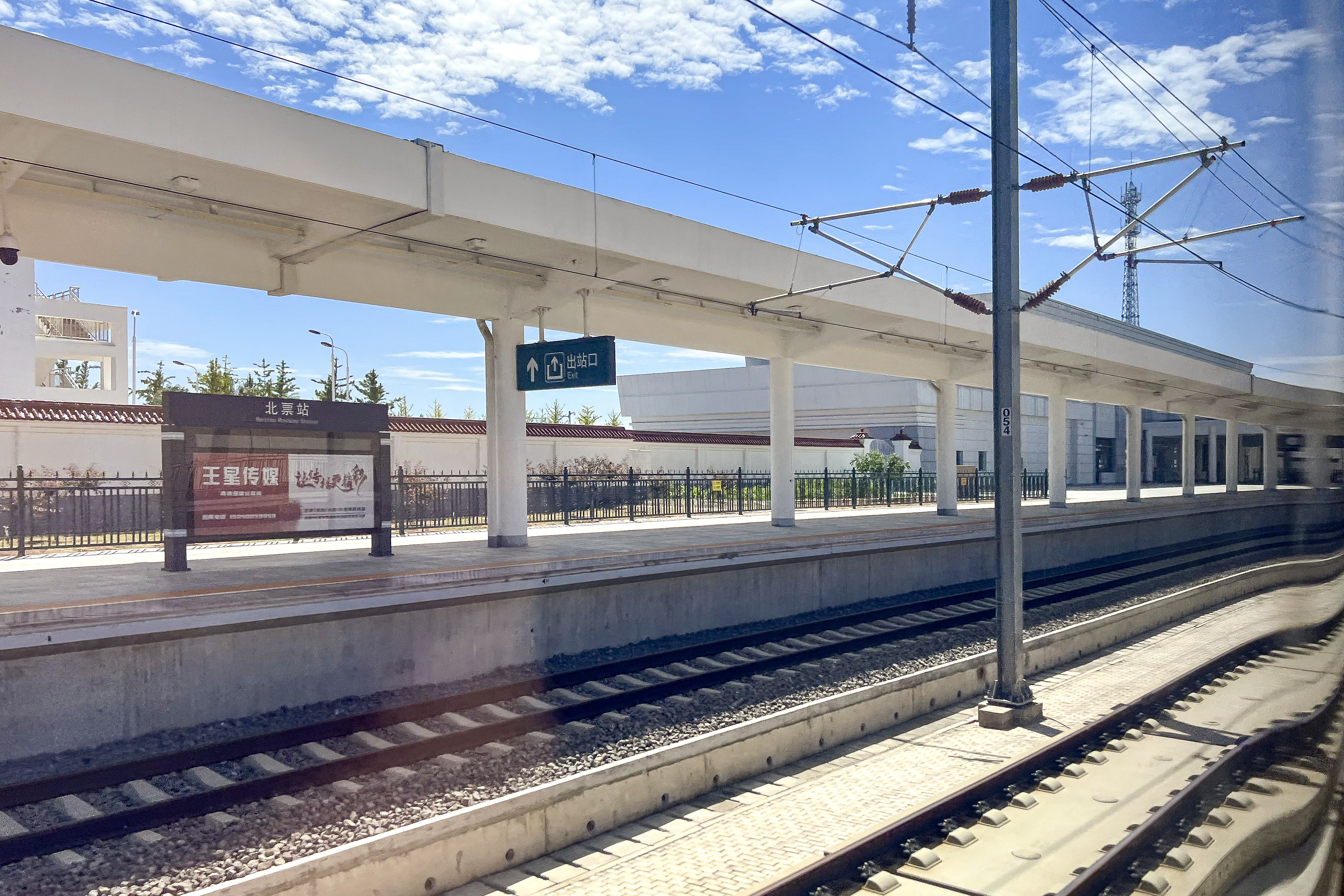
- Platform 1

General information
- Other names: Beipiao East
- Location: Liangshuihe, Beipiao, Chaoyang, Liaoning; China
- Coordinates: 41.766455°N 120.783338°E
- Line: Beijing–Shenyang High-Speed Railway

Other information
- Station code: Telegraph: BPT; Pinyin: BPI

History
- Opened: 29 December 2018

Services
| Preceding station | China Railway High-speed | Following station |
|---|---|---|
| Liaoning Chaoyang towards Beijing | Beijing–Shenyang high-speed railway Part of the Beijing–Harbin High-Speed Railway | Wulanmutu towards Shenyang |
Location

The Beipiao railway station is a railway station of Jingshen Passenger Railway that is located in People's Republic of China.
