= Chaoyang–Linghai high-speed railway =

High speed rail line in China

Chaoyang–Linghai high-speed railway 朝凌高速铁路

Overview
- Status: Operational
- Termini: Liaoning Chaoyang; Linghai South

Service
- Operator(s): China Railway High-speed

Technical
- Line length: 107 km (66 mi)
- Track gauge: 1,435 mm (4 ft 8 1/2 in)
- Operating speed: 350 km/h (217 mph)

The Chaoyang–Linghai high-speed railway is a high-speed railway line in China. The railway is 107 kilometres (66 mi) long and has a design speed of 350 kilometres per hour (220 mph). The railway opened on August 3, 2021.

== History ==
Construction officially began in October 2017. Tracklaying was completed in December 2020. The railway opened on August 3, 2021.

== Stations ==
Station Name	Chinese	China Railway transfers/connections
Liaoning Chaoyang	辽宁朝阳	Beijing–Shenyang high-speed railway
Batuying	巴图营	
Jinzhou North	锦州北	
Linghai South	凌海南	Qinhuangdao–Shenyang passenger railway
