= Linghai South railway station =

Railway station in Jinzhou, Liaoning

Linghai South 凌海南
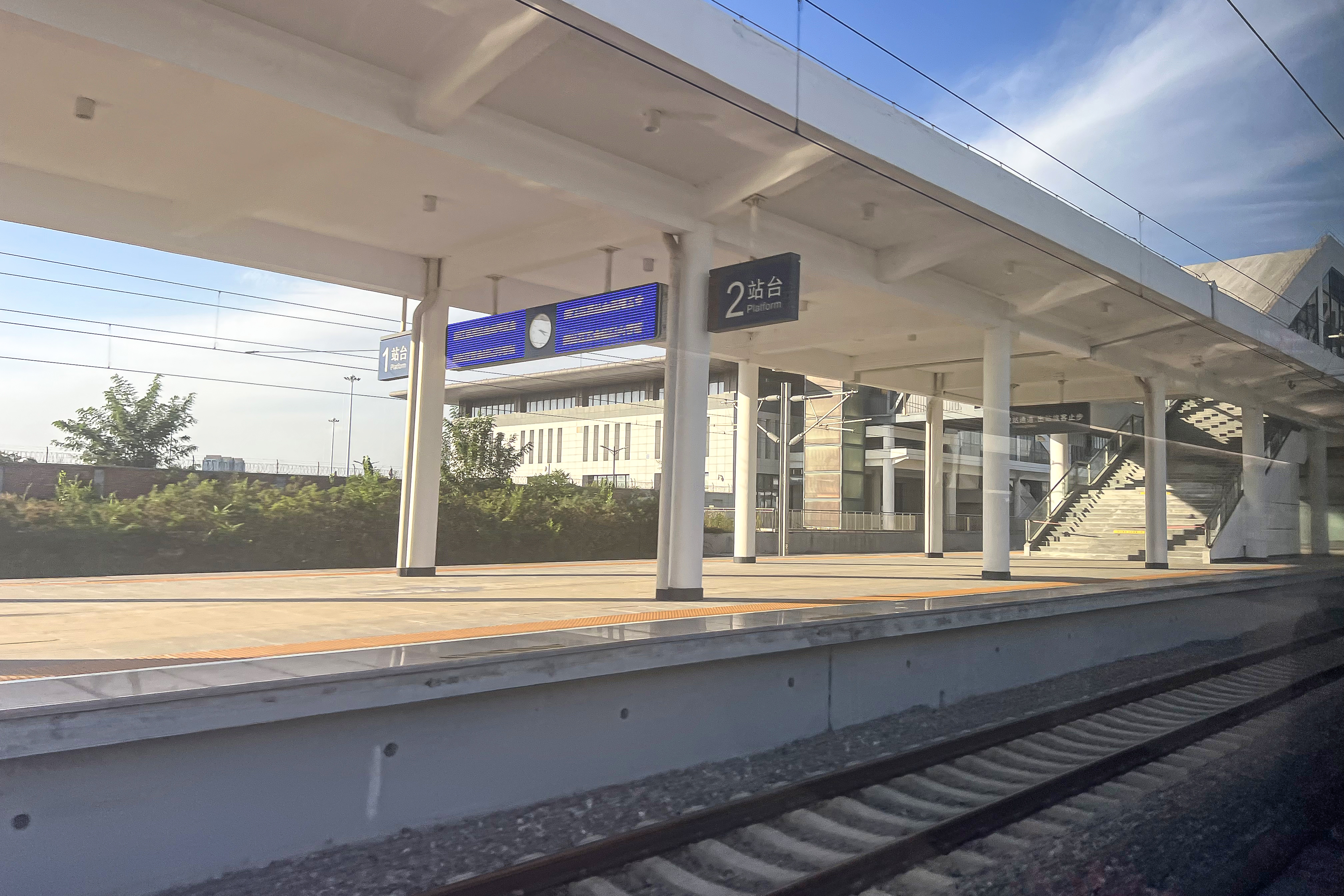

General information
- Location: Linghai, Jinzhou, Liaoning; China
- Coordinates: 41.151214°N 121.370197°E
- Lines: Qinhuangdao–Shenyang high-speed railway; Chaoyang–Linghai high-speed railway

History
- Opened: August 3, 2021
Location

Linghai South railway station (Chinese: 凌海南站) is a railway station in Linghai, Jinzhou, Liaoning, China. It opened with the Chaoyang–Linghai high-speed railway on 3 August 2021.

The station is an infill station on the Qinhuangdao–Shenyang high-speed railway and the southern terminus of the Chaoyang–Linghai high-speed railway.

== See also ==
- Linghai railway station

Preceding station	China Railway High-speed	Following station
Jinzhou South towards Qinhuangdao	Qinhuangdao–Shenyang high-speed railway	Panjin North towards Shenyang
Jinzhou North towards Liaoning Chaoyang	Chaoyang–Linghai high-speed railway	Terminus
