= Gaoliying, Beijing =

Gaoliying Town 高丽营镇
- Town
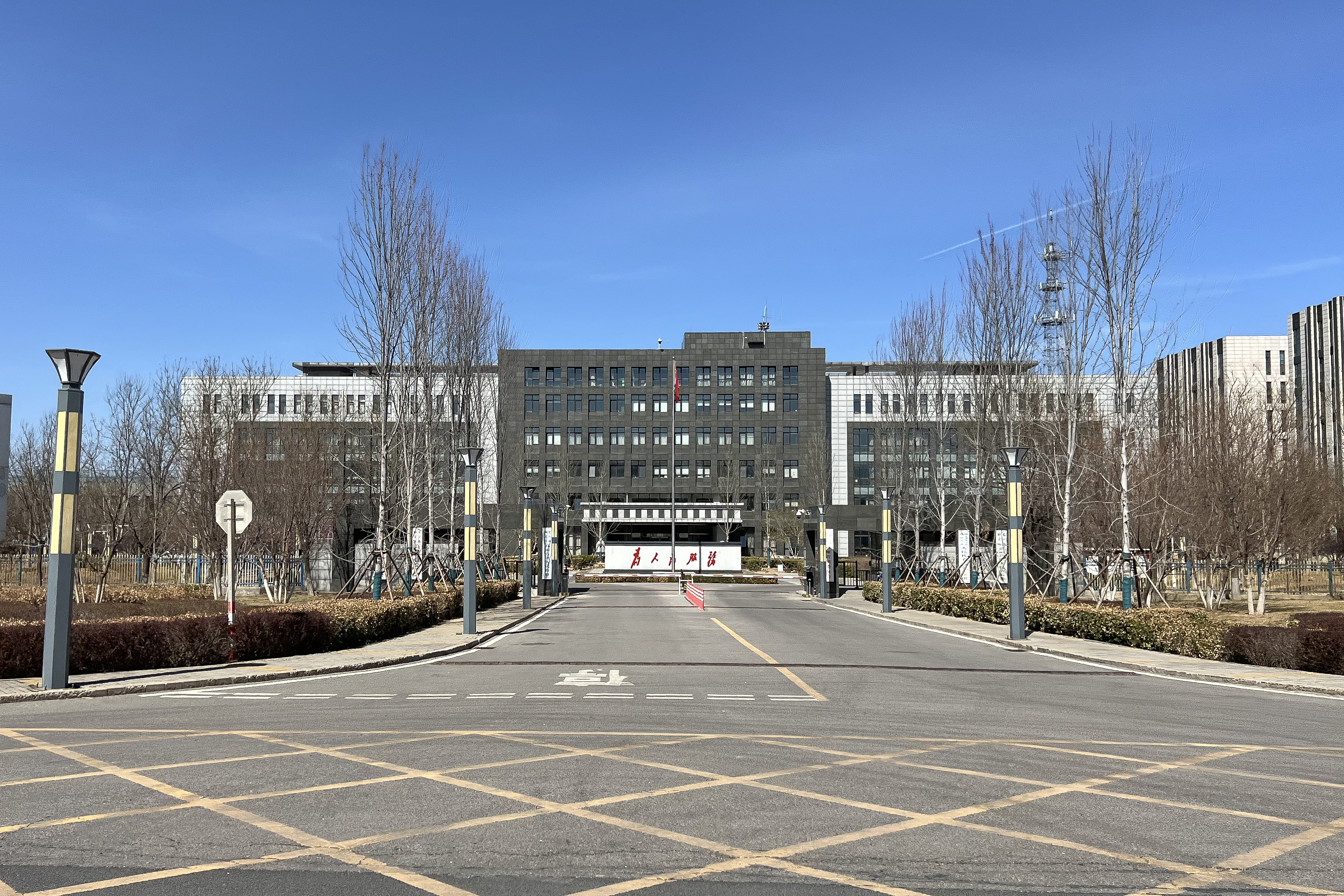
- Building of government of Gaoliying Town in 2024

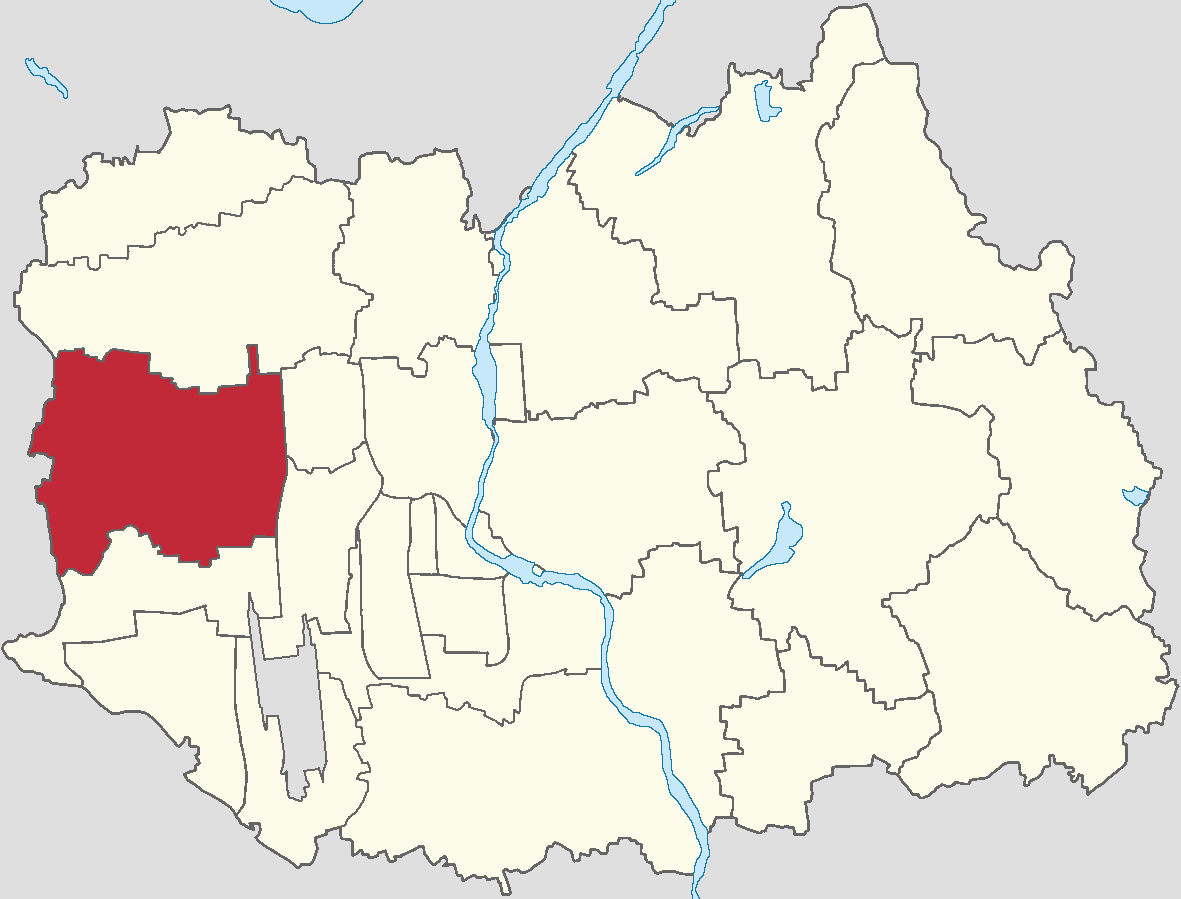
- Location of Gaoliying Town within Shunyi District

- Location within Beijing Location within China
- Coordinates: 40°09′28″N 116°29′36″E
- Country: China
- Municipality: Beijing
- District: Shunyi
- Village-level Divisions: 1 communities 25 villages

Area
  - Total: 61.77 km^{2} (23.85 sq mi)
- Elevation: 39 m (128 ft)

Population (2020)
  - Total: 80,840
  - Density: 1,309/km^{2} (3,390/sq mi)
- Time zone: UTC+8 (China Standard)
- Postal code: 101303
- Area code: 010

Gaoliying Town (simplified Chinese: 高丽营镇; traditional Chinese: 高麗營鎮; pinyin: Gāolíyíng Zhèn) is a town just north of the Northern 6th Ring Road, in Shunyi District, Beijing.

The town is situated at the intersection of the Jingcheng Expressway, a six-lane expressway linking central Beijing via Huairou District and Miyun District to Chengde in Hebei province, and the 6th Ring Road. In the year 2020, its population was 80,840.

The name Gaoliying (Chinese: 高丽营; lit. 'Goryeo Camp') refers to the large number of immigrants from Goryeo who settled in this region during the Tang dynasty.

== History ==
Timeline of Gaoliying Town
Time	Status	Belonged to
Qing dynasty	Gaoliying Town	Changping County
1949–1950	Gaoliying Town	Shunyi County
1950–1956	Gaoliying Town	Changping County
1956–1958	Gaoliying Township	Shunyi County
1958–1975	Zhangxizhuang People's Commune	Shunyi County
1975–1983	Gaoliying People's Commune Zhangxizhuang People's Commune	Shunyi County
1983–1989	Gaoliying Township Zhangxizhuang Township	Shunyi County
1989–1998	Gaoliying Town Zhangxizhuang Town	Shunyi County
1998–present	Gaoliying Town	Shunyi District

== Administrative divisions ==
As of 2021, Gaoliying Town consisted of 26 subdivisions, including 1 community and 25 villages:

Administrative division code	Subdivision names	Name transliteration	Type
110113101001	丽喜花园	Lixi Huayuan	Community
110113101201	一村	Yicun	Village
110113101202	二村	Ercun	Village
110113101203	三村	Sancun	Village
110113101204	四村	Sicun	Village
110113101205	五村	Wucun	Village
110113101206	六村	Liucun	Village
110113101207	七村	Qicun	Village
110113101208	八村	Bacun	Village
110113101209	南王路	Nan Wanglu	Village
110113101210	北王路	Bei Wanglu	Village
110113101211	西王路	Xi Wanglu	Village
110113101212	唐自头	Tangzitou	Village
110113101213	于庄	Yuzhuang	Village
110113101214	张喜庄	Zhangxizhuang	Village
110113101215	东马各庄	Dong Magezhuang	Village
110113101216	西马各庄	Xi Magezhuang	Village
110113101217	夏县营	Xiaxianying	Village
110113101218	河津营	Hejinying	Village
110113101219	南郎中	Nan Langzhong	Village
110113101220	后渠河	Hou Quhe	Village
110113101221	前渠河	Qian Quhe	Village
110113101222	闫家营	Yanjiaying	Village
110113101223	水坡	Shuipo	Village
110113101224	羊房	Yangfang	Village
110113101225	文化营	Wenhuaying	Village

== Gallery ==
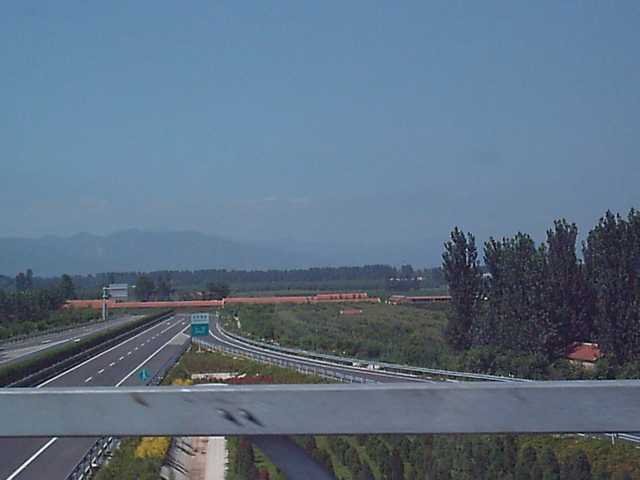
Gaoliying—also home to the northernmost extremity of the Jingcheng Expressway, 2004

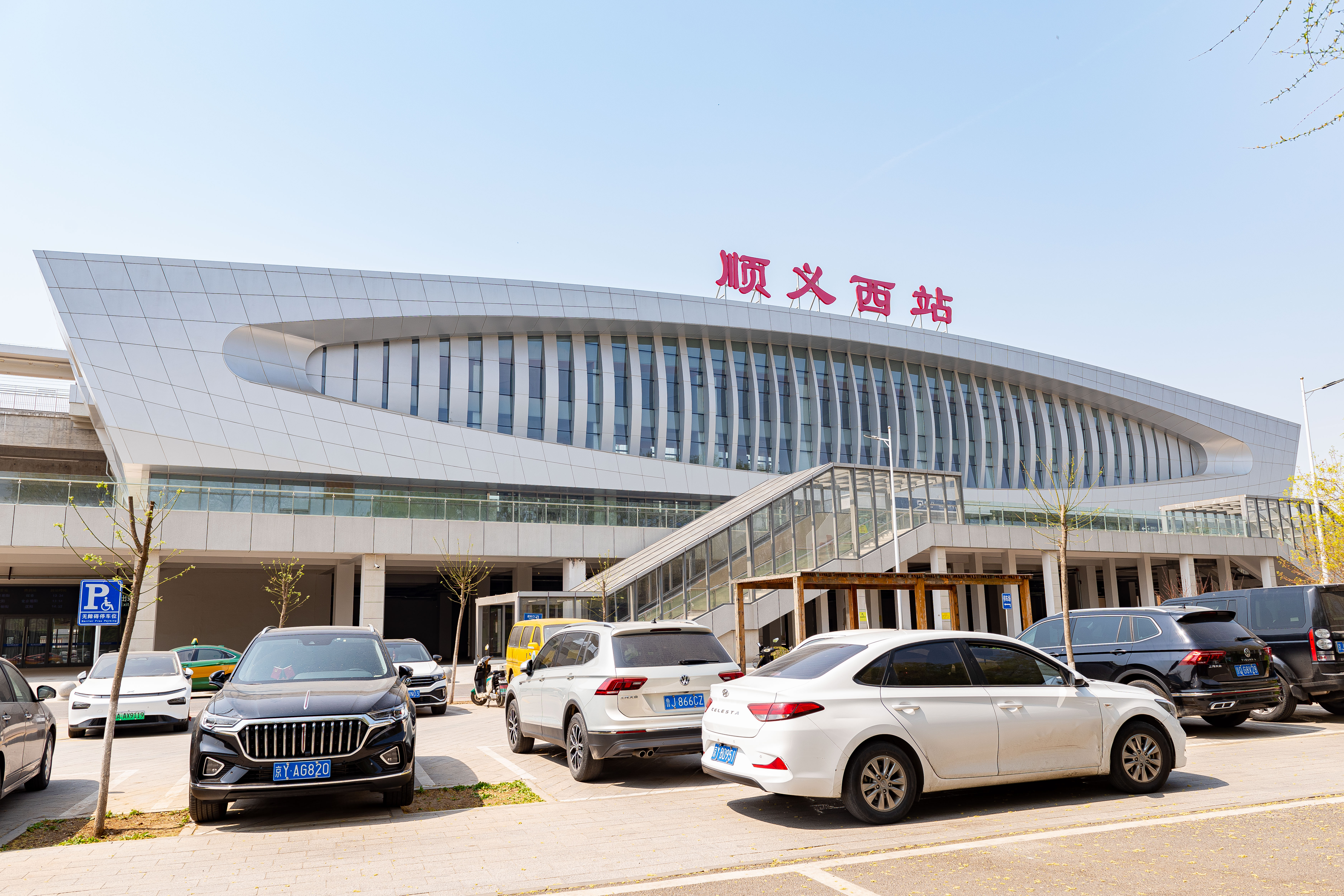
Shunyi West railway station within the town, 2024

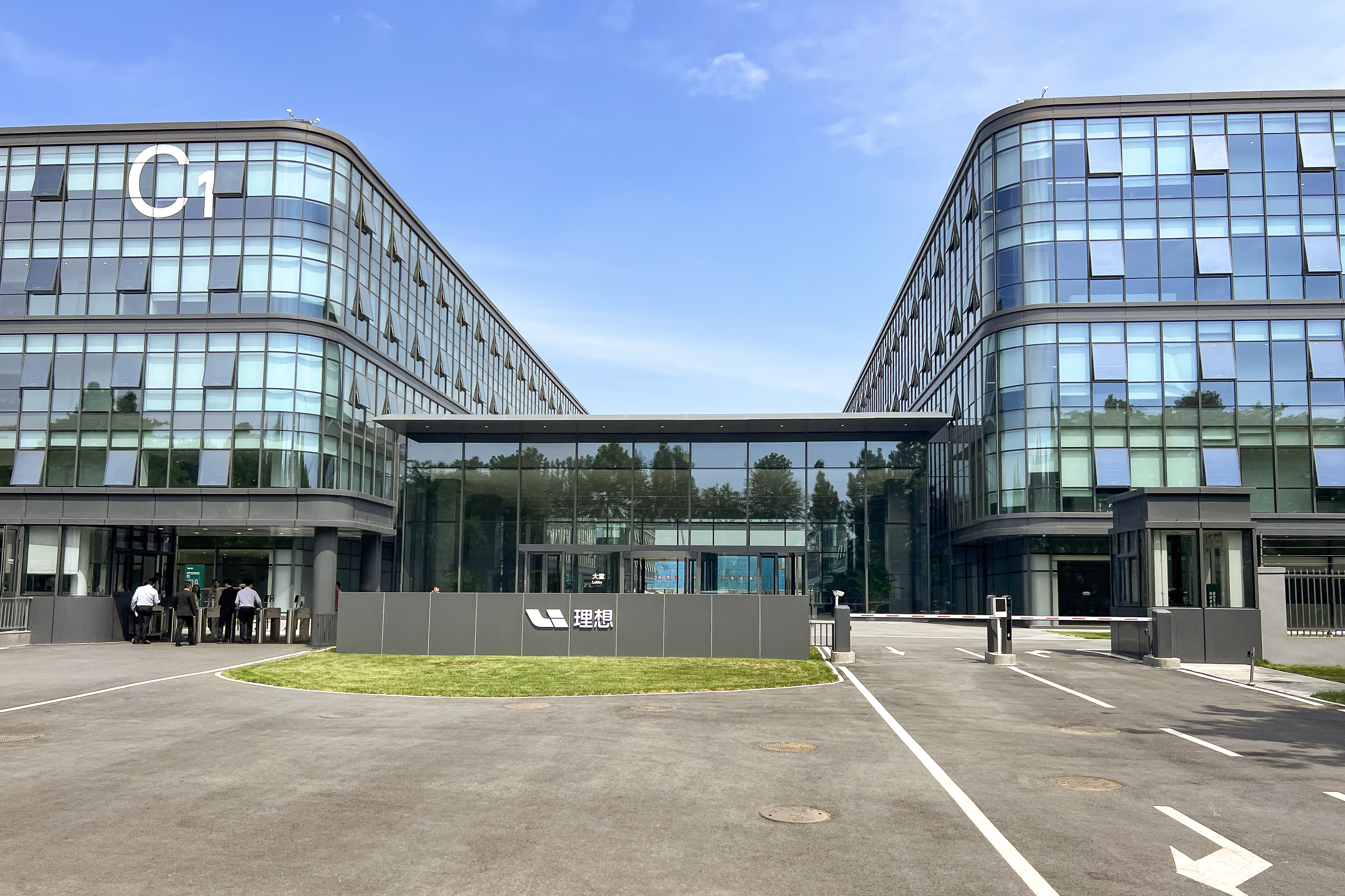
Li Auto R&D center within the town, 2024

== See also ==
- List of township-level divisions of Beijing
