= Pingquan North railway station =

Railway station in Hebei, China

Pingquanbei 平泉北
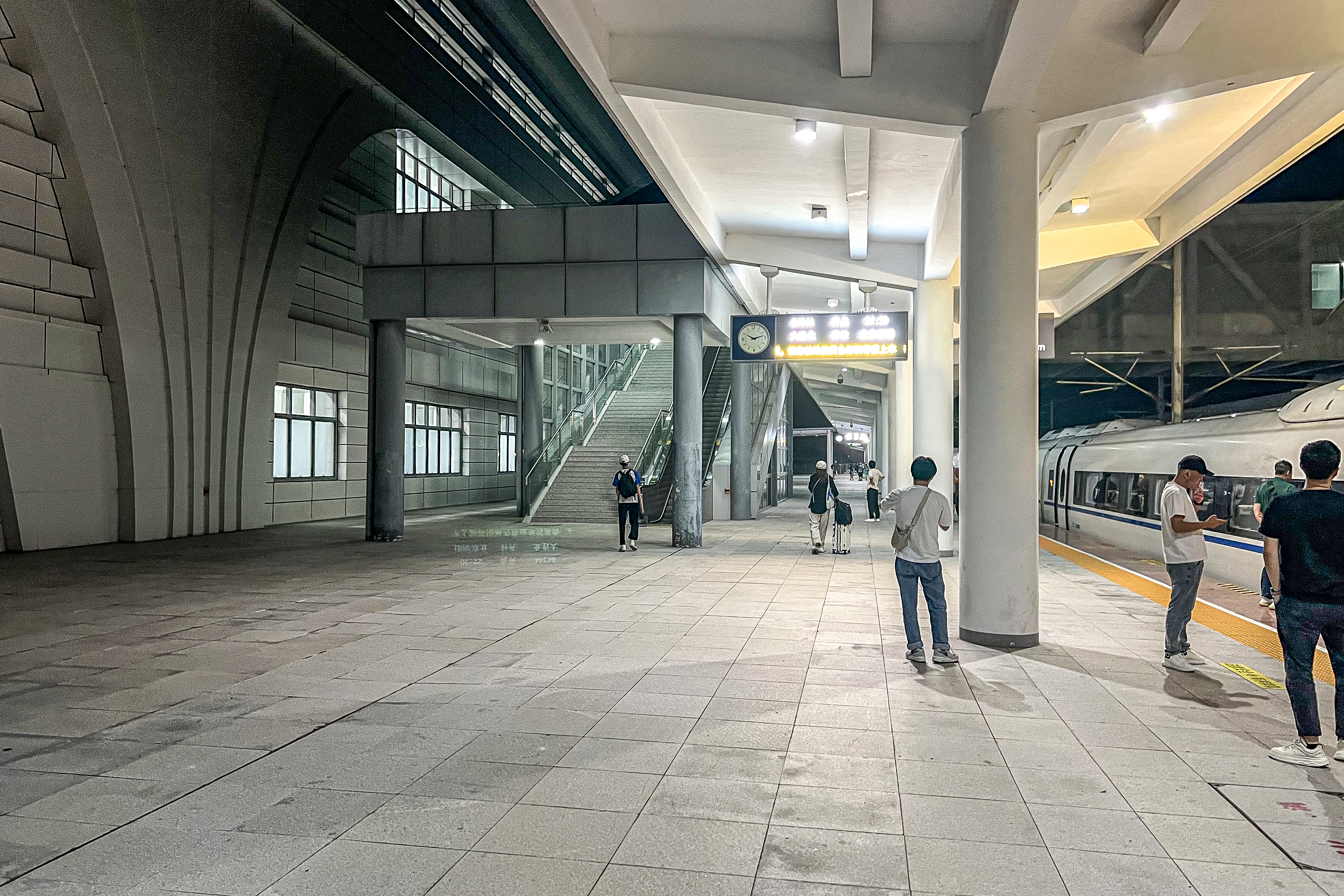
- Platform 1

General information
- Location: Houshangou Village, Pingquan Town, Pingquan County, Hebei; China
- Coordinates: 41°02′20″N 118°42′43″E
- Line: Beijing–Shenyang High-Speed Railway

Other information
- Station code: PBP

History
- Opened: 29 December 2018
Location
- Location within Hebei

The Pingquan North railway station (Chinese: 平泉北站; pinyin: Píngquánběi Zhàn) is a station on the Beijing–Shenyang high-speed railway located in Pingquan County, Hebei.

== See also ==
- Pingquan railway station

Preceding station	China Railway High-speed	Following station
Chengdexian North towards Beijing	Beijing–Shenyang high-speed railway	Niuheliang towards Shenyang
