= Huairou South railway station =

Railway station in Beijing, China

Huairounan 怀柔南
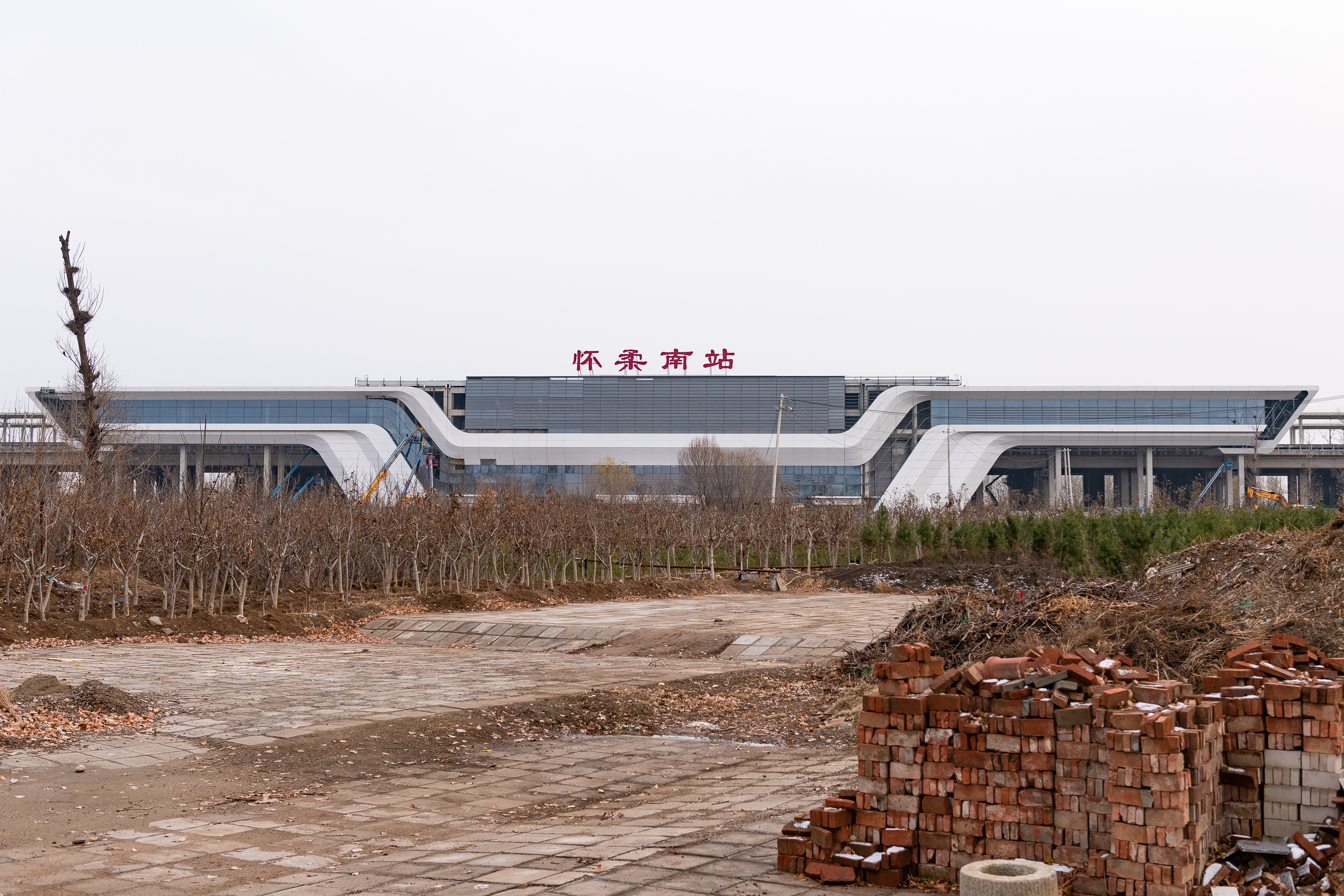
- Construction site in November 2020

General information
- Location: Huayuan Village, Yangsong Town, Huairou, Beijing
- Coordinates: 40.277160°N 116.698821°E
- Operated by: China Railway Beijing Group
- Line: Beijing–Shenyang high-speed railway
- Platforms: 2 island platforms

Construction
- Structure type: Elevated (railway)

Other information
- Station code: IMP (telegram code); HRN (pinyin code)

History
- Opened: 22 January 2021

Services
Preceding station	China Railway High-speed	Following station
Shunyi West towards Beijing	Beijing–Shenyang high-speed railway Part of the Beijing–Harbin high-speed railway	Miyun towards Shenyang
Location

Huairou South railway station (Chinese: 怀柔南站; pinyin: Huáiróu Nán Zhàn), is a railway station that is a part of the Beijing–Shenyang high-speed railway located in Huairou, Beijing, China. It was opened on 22 January 2021.
