= Fuxin railway station =

High-speed railway station in Fuxin, China

Fuxin railway station 阜新
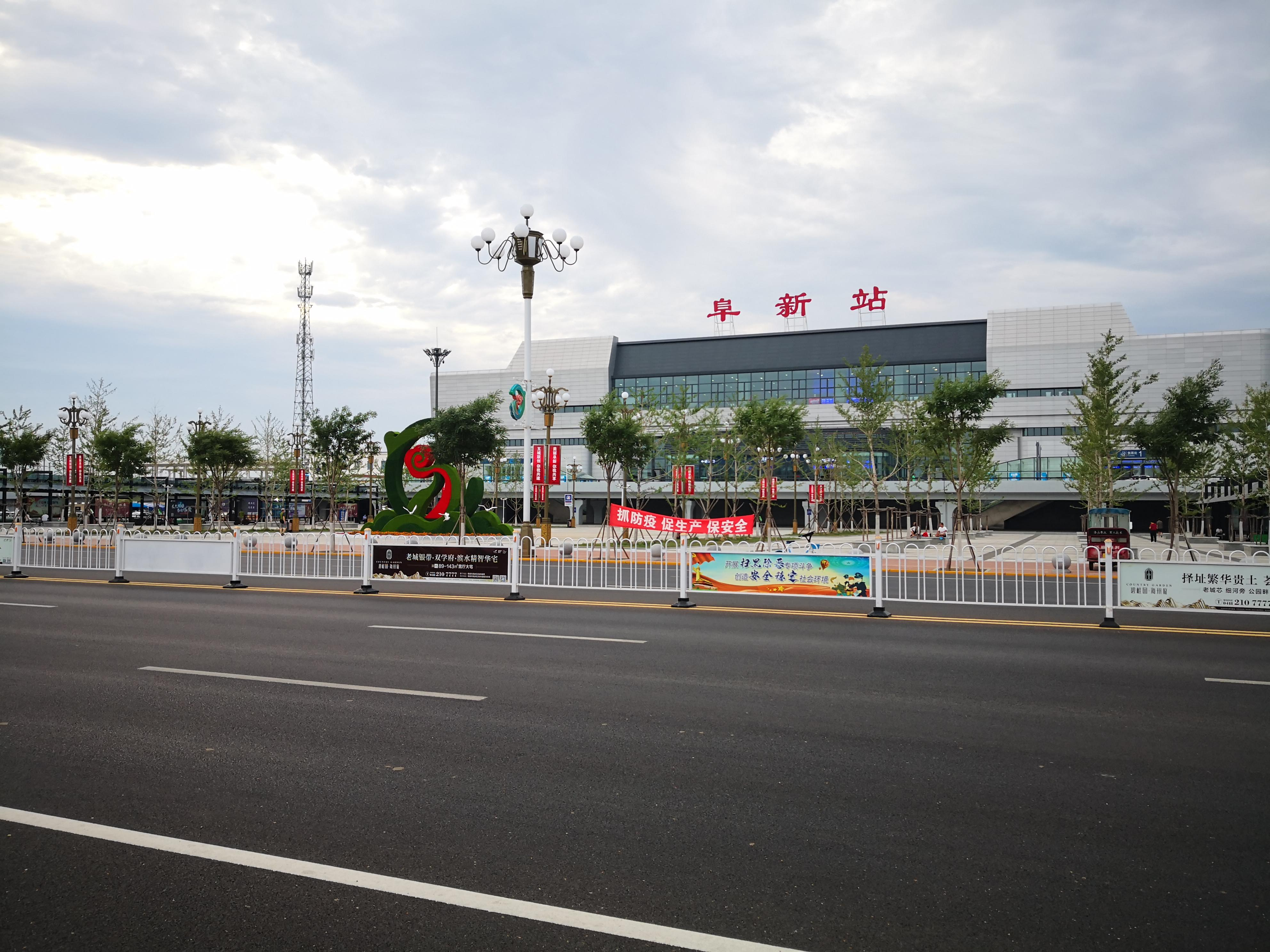
- Station building of Fuxin

General information
- Location: Sihe Town, Xihe District, Fuxin, Liaoning; China
- Coordinates: 42.055337°N 121.654537°E
- Line(s): Beijing–Shenyang High-Speed Railway

Other information
- Station code: Telegraph code: FOT; Pinyin code: FXI

History
- Opened: 29 December 2018
- Previous names: Fuxin North railway station
Location

Fuxin railway station (Chinese: 阜新站) is a railway station on the Beijing-Harbin High-Speed Railway in Fuxin, Liaoning, China.

== History ==
This station was named Fuxin North railway station during planning stage.

On 1 December, 2016, the China Railway Corporation renamed the former Fuxin North Station to Fuxin Station, while the original Fuxin Station was renamed Fuxin South Station.

The station was opened on 29 December, 2018.

During the 2019 Spring Festival, the number of high-speed trains stopping at Fuxin Station increased to 35, making it the station with the most trains on the Beijing-Shenyang high speed railway.

== Station information ==
Fuxin railway station has a building area of 10,898 square meters. The station has 2 platforms and 6 tracks. Fuxin Station is a major midway stop on the Beijing-Harbin High-Speed Railway.

Preceding station	China Railway High-speed	Following station
Wulanmutu towards Beijing	Beijing–Shenyang high-speed railway	Heishan North towards Shenyang
