= Chengde South railway station =

High-speed railway station in Hebei, China

Chengdenan 承德南
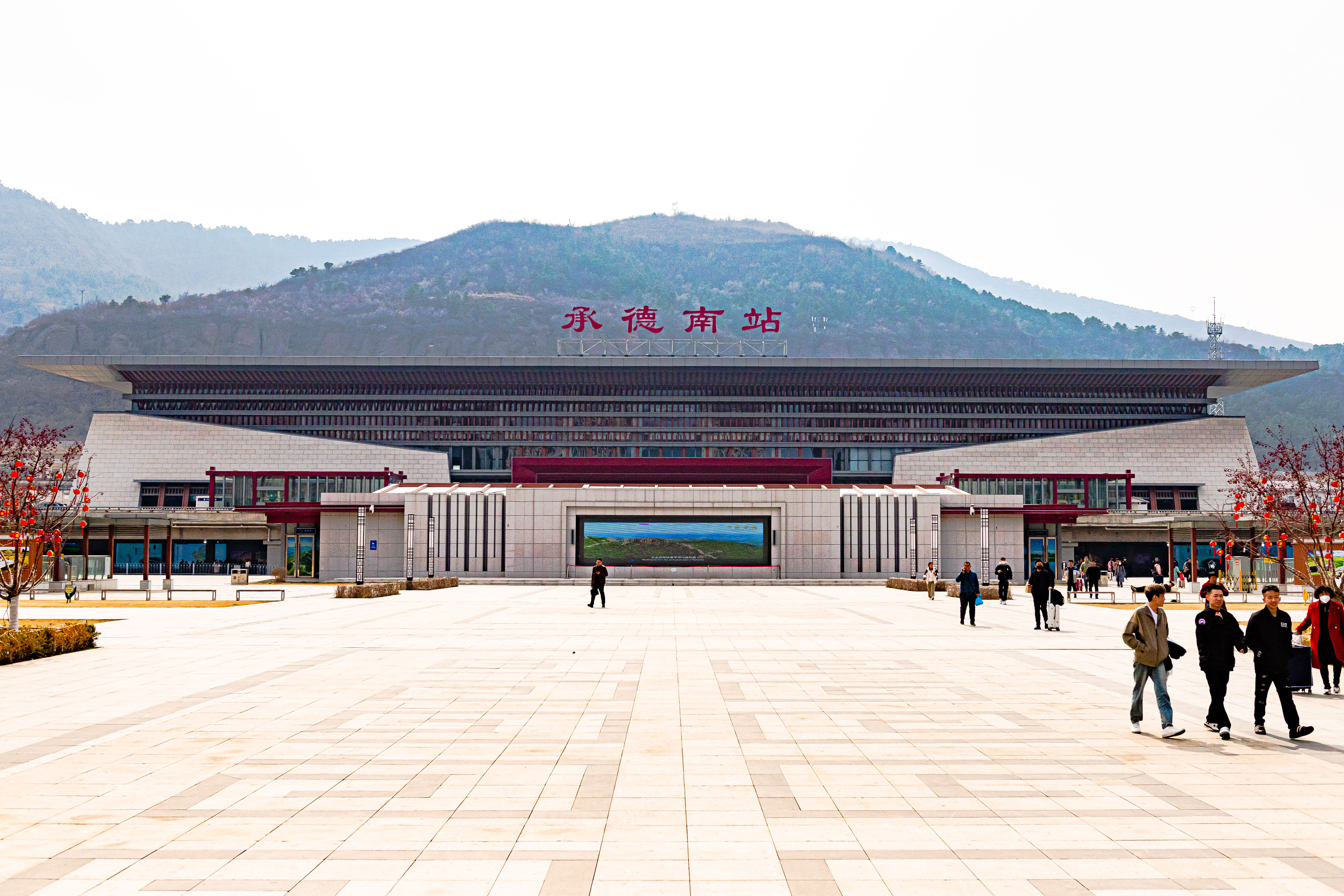
- Station exterior in March 2024

General information
- Location: Guoyingzi Village, Fengyingzi Town, Shuangqiao District, Chengde; China
- Coordinates: 40.883037°N 117.958632°E
- Lines: Beijing–Shenyang high-speed railway Tianjin–Chengde high-speed railway (planned)
- Platforms: 4
- Tracks: 10

Other information
- Station code: 52920 (TMIS); IVP (telegram code); CDN (pinyin code)

History
- Opened: 29 December 2018
Location

Chengde South Railway Station, located in Chengde City, Hebei Province, China, is a Class 1 station under the jurisdiction of the Chengde Railway Section of the China Railway Beijing Group.

== Station information ==
The station has a scale of 4 platforms and 10 tracks, with a building area of 15,000 square meters. Chengdenan Station officially commenced operations on December 29, 2018.

The station is an important part of the national "Eight Vertical and Eight Horizontal" high-speed railway network. The Beijing-Shenyang High Speed Railway is a significant project of the 13th Five-Year Plan.
