= Beijing–Shenyang high-speed railway =

Railway line in China

Beijing–Harbin high-speed railway Beijing–Shenyang Section
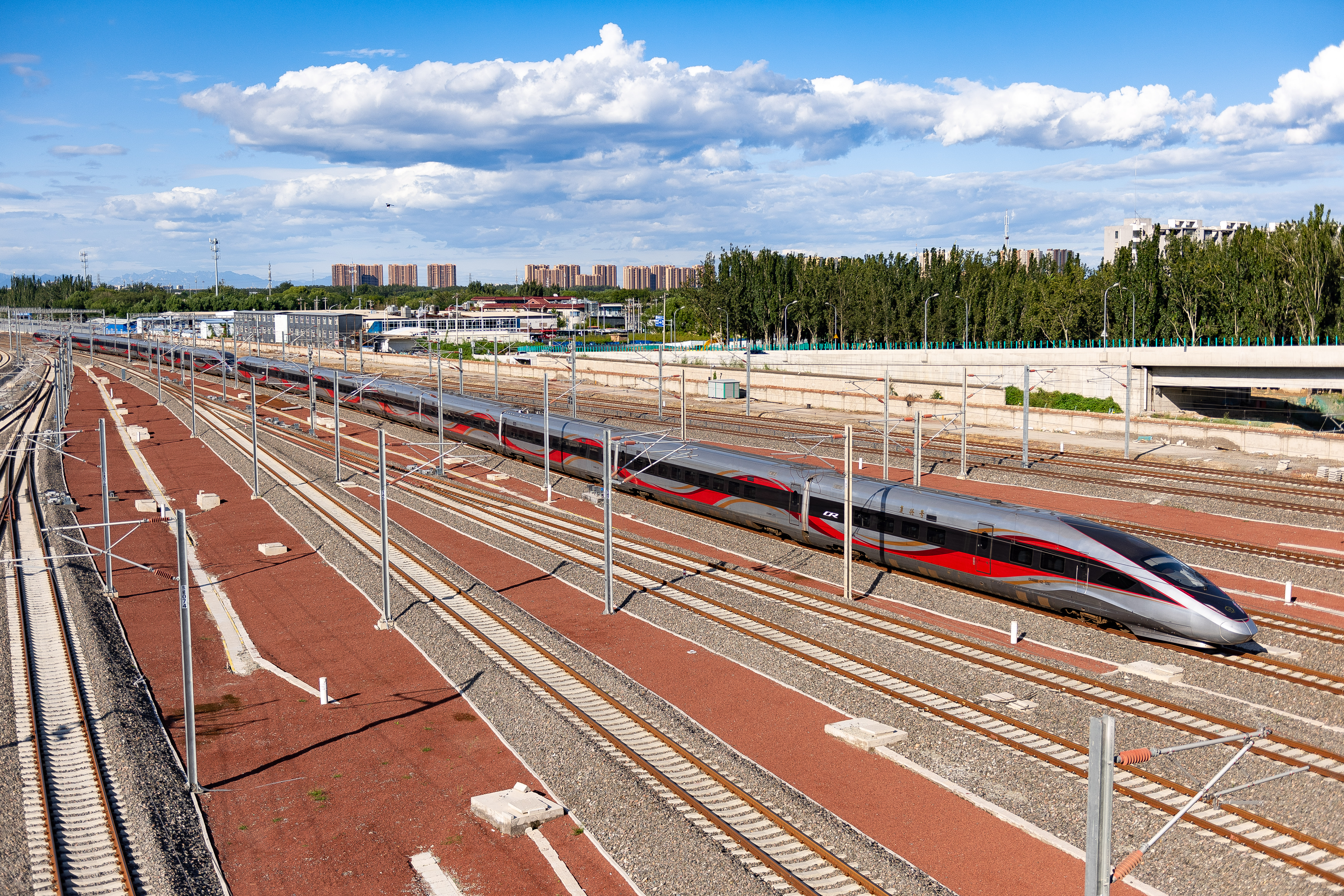
- A CR400BF-GZ leaving Beijing Chaoyang railway station as G919, the non-stop train to Shenyang

Overview
- Native name: 京沈客运专线 京哈高速铁路北京至沈阳段
- Status: Operational
- Owner: China Railway
- Locale: Beijing; Hebei province; Liaoning province
- Termini: Beijing/Beijing Chaoyang; Shenyang/Shenyangbei
- Stations: 20

Service
- Type: High-speed rail
- System: China Railway High-speed
- Operator(s): CR Beijing; CR Shenyang
- Depot(s): Shenyang, Harbin
- Rolling stock: CRH380BG series CR400BF series

Technical
- Line length: 699.864 km (434.875 mi)
- Track length: 5 m
- Track gauge: 1,435 mm (4 ft 8 1/2 in) standard gauge
- Electrification: 25 kV 50 Hz AC (Overhead line)

Beijing–Shenyang high-speed railway is a 700-kilometer (430 mi)-long high-speed rail line of the China Railway High-speed between Beijing and Shenyang, the capital of Liaoning province. It is a section of the Beijing–Harbin high-speed railway.

The line was intended to relieve a significant bottleneck in China's transportation network between the Northeast region and Beijing. The route runs to the north and inland of the existing routes which hug the coast around the Bohai sea. The new line leaves Beijing heading northeast to Chengde in Hebei province then turns east through Chaoyang, and Fuxin in Liaoning province, on route to Shenyang. There are 16 stations, which were the last section of the Beijing–Harbin high-speed railway to be completed; the other sections of that line had been operational since December 1, 2012.

The line has a maximum design speed of 350 km/h (220 mph) though regular services operate at around 250 to 300 km/h (160 to 190 mph). Travel time between Shenyang and Beijing was cut from 4 hours to just 2 hours and 17 minutes.

== History ==
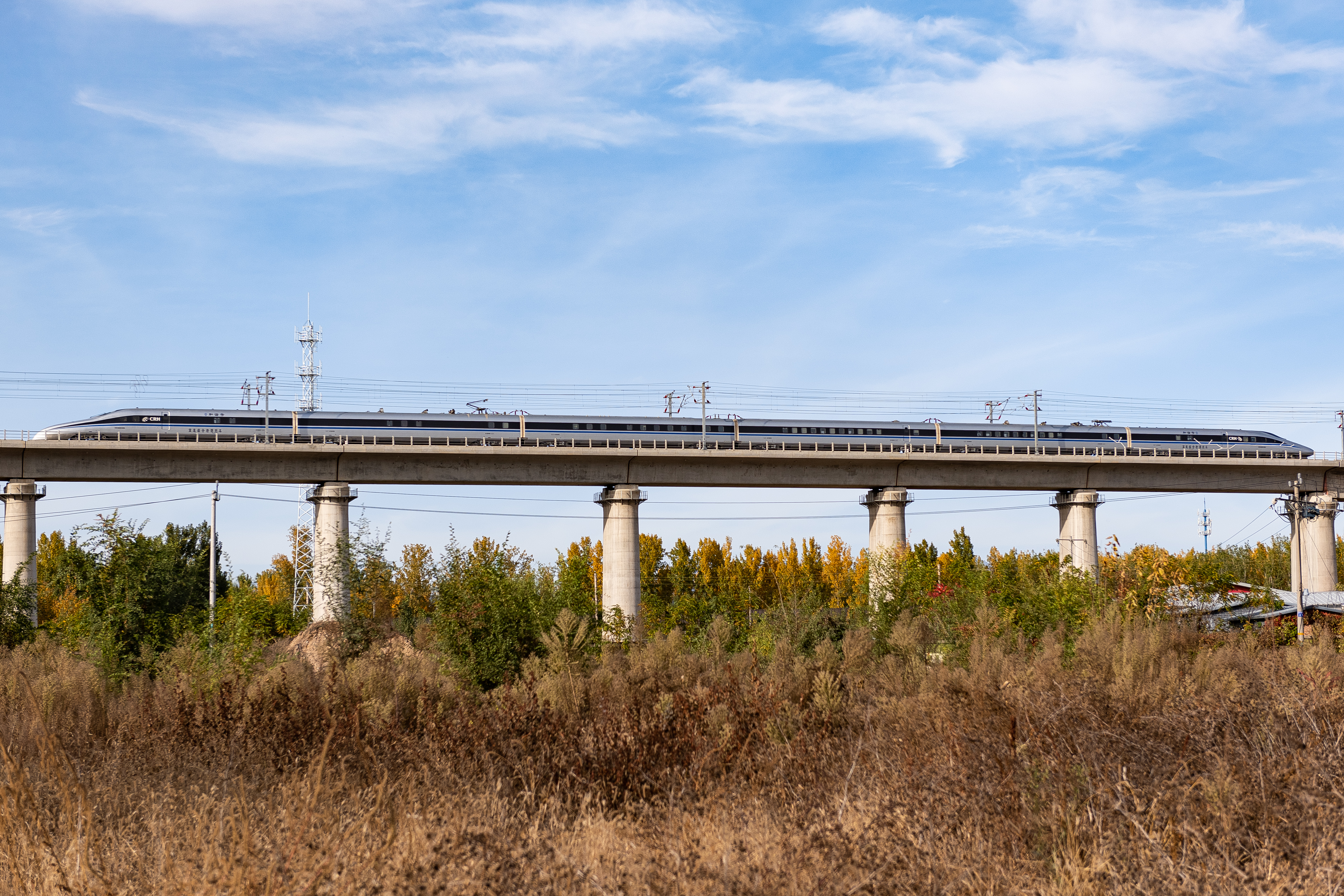
CRH380AM performing a test run on the Beijing–Shenyang HSR in Beinianfeng Village, Yangsong Town, Huairou District, Beijing in October 2020

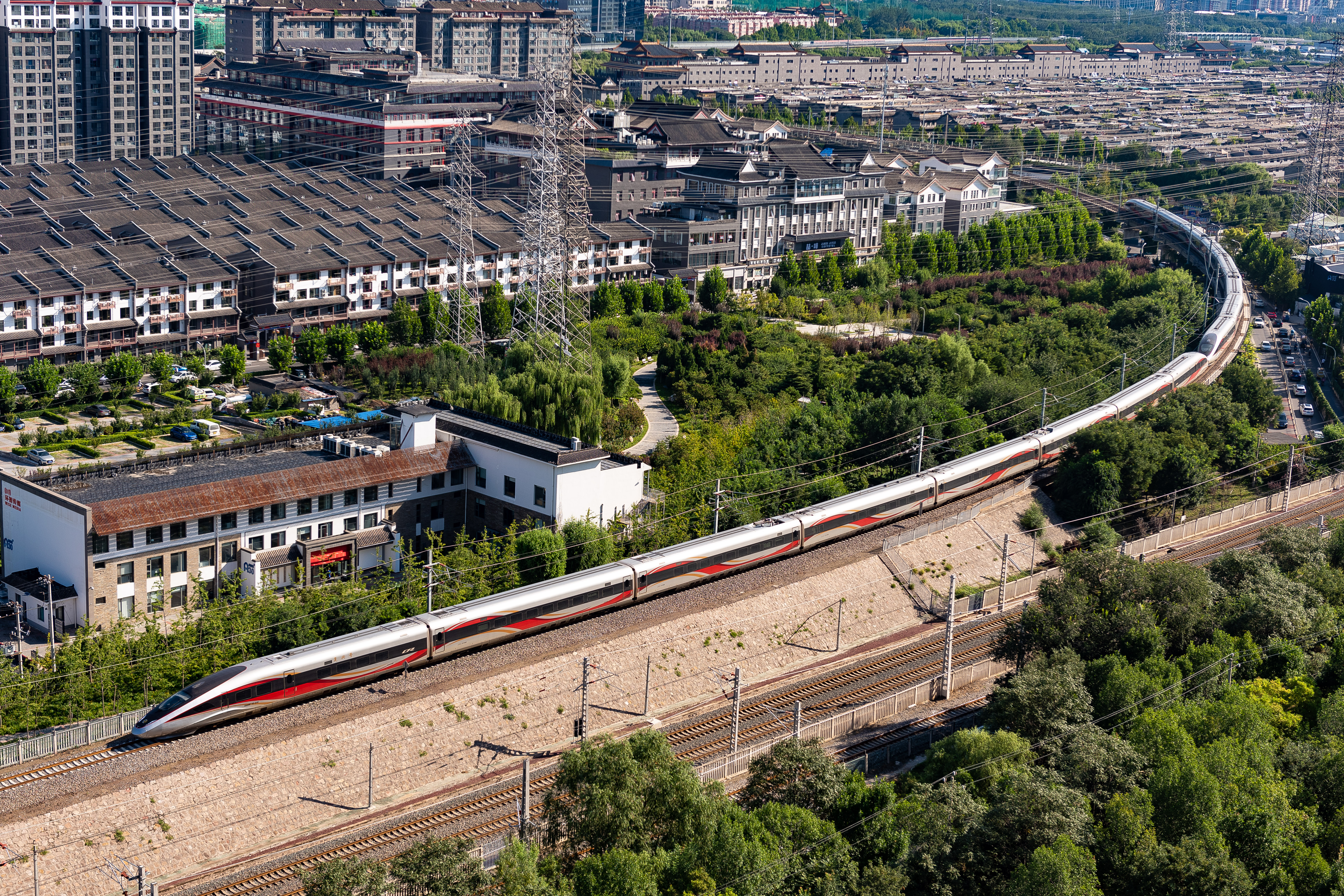
A portion of Beijing Northeast Ring railway is used for Beijing-Shenyang HSR trains to and from Beijing railway station

Construction was supposed to have started in 2010 with the project to be completed by 2012, but was delayed until March 2014.

Protests by residents along the planned route caused several safety reviews to examine the potential noise pollution and electro-magnetic radiation. The first two reviews suggested installing noise shielding along sensitive parts of the line. The third review called for noise shielding, in addition to above ground tunnels, to completely enclose the line while near urban areas. In addition, the starting point has been relocated to Beijing Chaoyang railway station (formerly known as Xinghuo railway station) in Chaoyang District of Beijing.

In August 2013, the Beijing municipal government published a notice calling for bids to build the line until its status is completed and operational. The total investment was expected to be 124.5 billion yuan.

The Shenyang to Chengde South section opened on December 29, 2018. The remaining section between Chengde South and Beijing Chaoyang opened on January 22, 2021.

On June 25, 2021, G902/903, G907/908 and G915/916 trains were extended to the Beijing railway station, thus the Beijing-Shenyang high-speed railway has charted trains arriving and departing at the Beijing railway station.

== Stations ==
Station	Chinese	Distance (km)	Prefecture-level city	Province/ Municipality	Metro transfers
Beijing (Note: Since June 25, 2021.)	北京		N/A	Beijing	2
Beijing Chaoyang	北京朝阳		N/A	Beijing	3
Shunyi West	顺义西		N/A	Beijing	
Huairou South	怀柔南		N/A	Beijing	
Miyun	密云		N/A	Beijing	
Xinglongxian West	兴隆县西		Chengde	Hebei	
Anjiang	安匠		Chengde	Hebei	
Chengde South	承德南		Chengde	Hebei	
Chengdexian North	承德县北		Chengde	Hebei	
Pingquan North	平泉北		Chengde	Hebei	
Niuheliang	牛河梁		Chaoyang	Liaoning	
Kazuo	喀左		Chaoyang	Liaoning	
Nailingao	奈林皋		Chaoyang	Liaoning	
Liaoning Chaoyang	辽宁朝阳		Chaoyang	Liaoning	
Beipiao	北票		Chaoyang	Liaoning	
Wulanmutu	乌兰木图		Fuxin	Liaoning	
Fuxin	阜新		Fuxin	Liaoning	
Heishan North	黑山北		Jinzhou	Liaoning	
Xinmin North	新民北		Shenyang	Liaoning	
Shenyang West	沈阳西		Shenyang	Liaoning	
Shenyang	沈阳		Shenyang	Liaoning	1

== See also ==
- Beijing–Harbin high-speed railway
- Qinhuangdao–Shenyang high-speed railway
- Beijing–Harbin Railway
