= 平安 =

平安 is an East Asian name meaning "Flat tranquil" or "Peaceful".

平安 may refer to:

- Ping'an (disambiguation), the Chinese pinyin transliteration
- Heian (disambiguation), the Japanese transliteration
- Pyongan Province, former Korean province
