= Heiban =

Heiban may refer to:

- Heiban people, a people of the Nuba Mountains in South Kordofan, Sudan
- Heiban languages, spoken in the Nuba Mountains of Sudan
- A Japanese pitch accent pattern

== See also ==
- Heian (disambiguation)
