= 安平 =

安平 may refer to:

- Abira, Hokkaido, town located in Iburi Subprefecture, Hokkaido
- Anping (disambiguation), the Chinese pinyin transliteration
