= Dongsi Shitiao station =

Beijing Subway Line 2 and Line 3 station

Dongsi Shitiao 东四十条
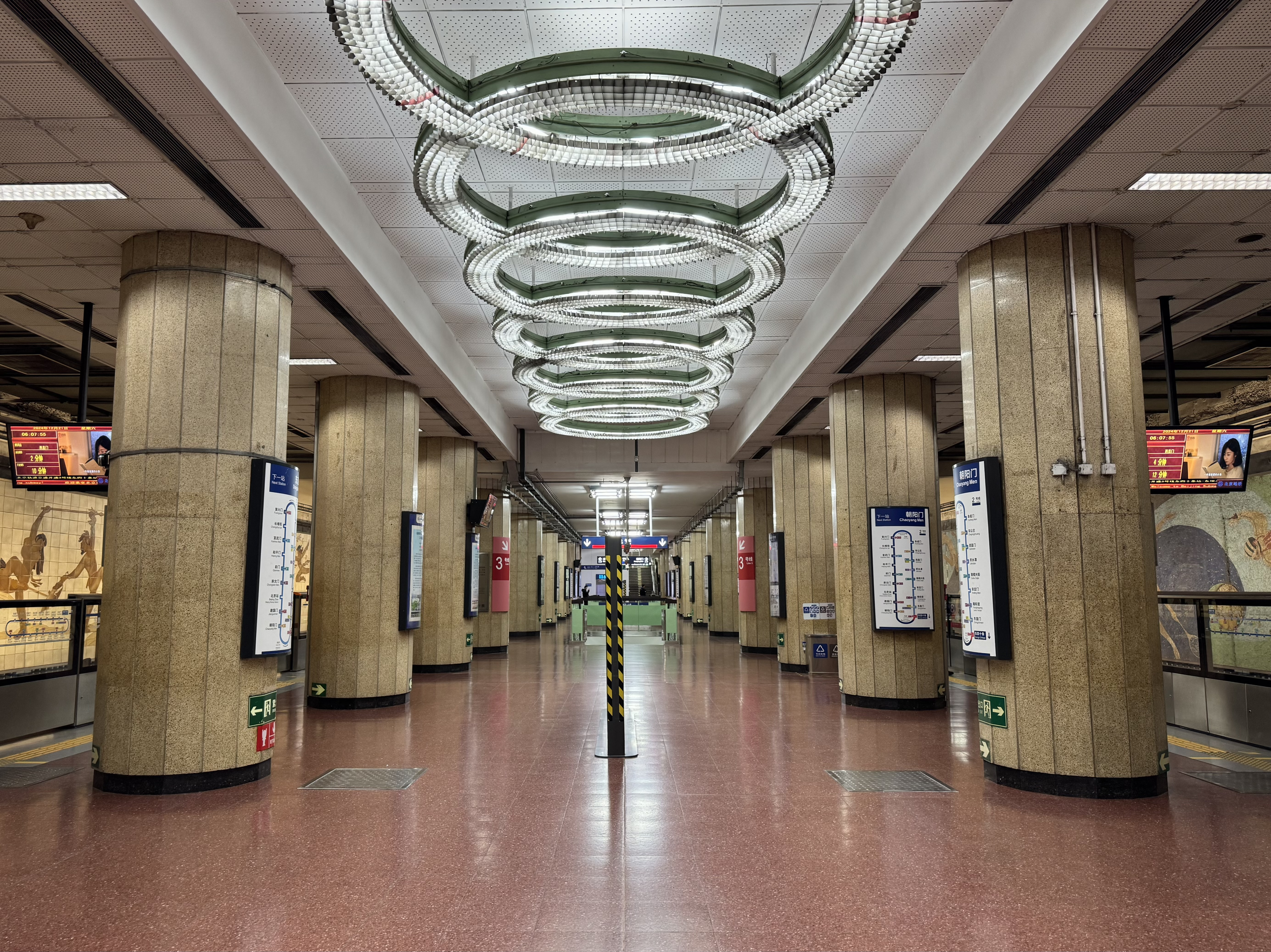
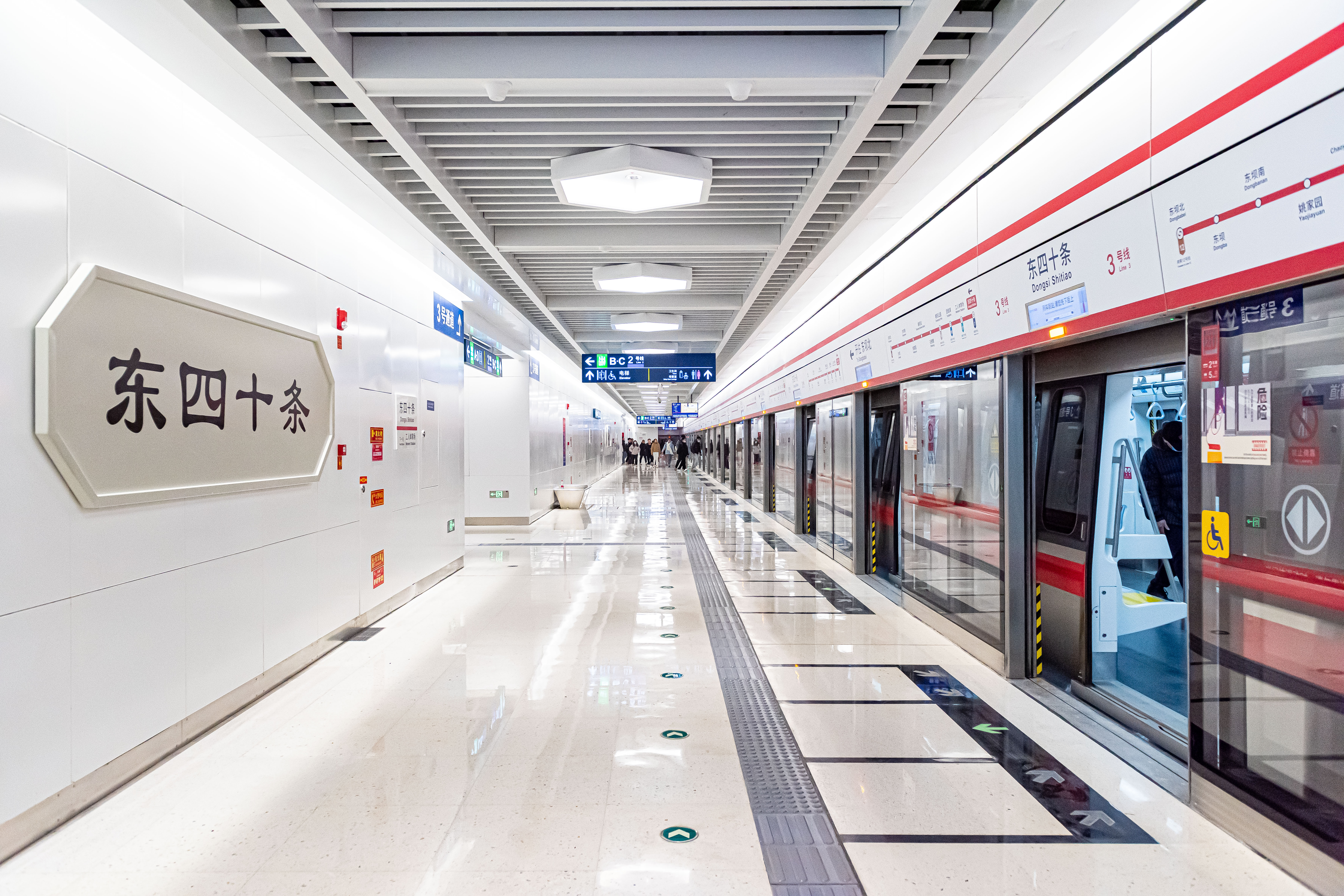
- Line 2 platform Line 3 eastbound platform

General information
- Location: Dongsi Shitiao Bridge (East 2nd Ring Road and Ping'an Avenue); Dongcheng District, Beijing; China
- Coordinates: 39°56′02″N 116°26′03″E
- Operator: Beijing Mass Transit Railway Operation Corporation Limited
- Lines: Line 2; Line 3
- Platforms: 4 (1 island platform and 1 split island platform)
- Tracks: 4

Construction
- Structure type: Underground
- Accessible: Yes

Other information
- Status: in service
- Station code: 213 (Line 2)

History
- Opened: Line 2: September 20, 1984; 41 years ago; Line 3: December 15, 2024; 20 months ago

Services
Preceding station	Beijing Subway	Following station
Dongzhimen outer loop / anticlockwise	Line 2	Chaoyang Men inner loop / clockwise
Terminus	Line 3	Workers' Stadium towards Dongbabei
Location
- Location within Beijing

Dongsi Shitiao station (simplified Chinese: 东四十条站; traditional Chinese: 東四十條站; pinyin: Dōngsì Shítiáo zhàn) is an interchange station on Line 2 and Line 3 of the Beijing Subway.

== Name ==
Dongsi Subdistrict is an area in the northeastern side of the old town of Beijing. Hutongs are sorted numerically from south to north, and are called "tiao" in local parlance. Shitiao therefore refers to the tenth hutong in the Dongsi area, counted from south to north.

== Use ==
The station is particularly busy during Beijing Guo'an matches, due to its proximity to the Workers' Stadium.

== Station layout ==
The Line 2 station has an underground island platform, whilst the Line 3 station has an underground split island platform.

There is an unused platform below the existing Line 2 platform, built during the construction of the station, which was to have been used for the planned Line 3. The unused platform, originally meant for Line 3, will not be used for its original purpose, due to the newer rolling stock being too large for the original platform. Instead, it became the transfer concourse between the two lines. The connection between the two levels opened four decades after the station for Line 2 opened. For Line 3, two new platforms were built seven or eight metres below the original, one for each direction.

To allow construction of Line 3 platforms, the Line 2 station suspended service between November 25, 2023 and February 27, 2024.

== Exits ==
There are four exits, lettered A, B, C, and D. Exits B and C have accessible elevators.

== Gallery ==
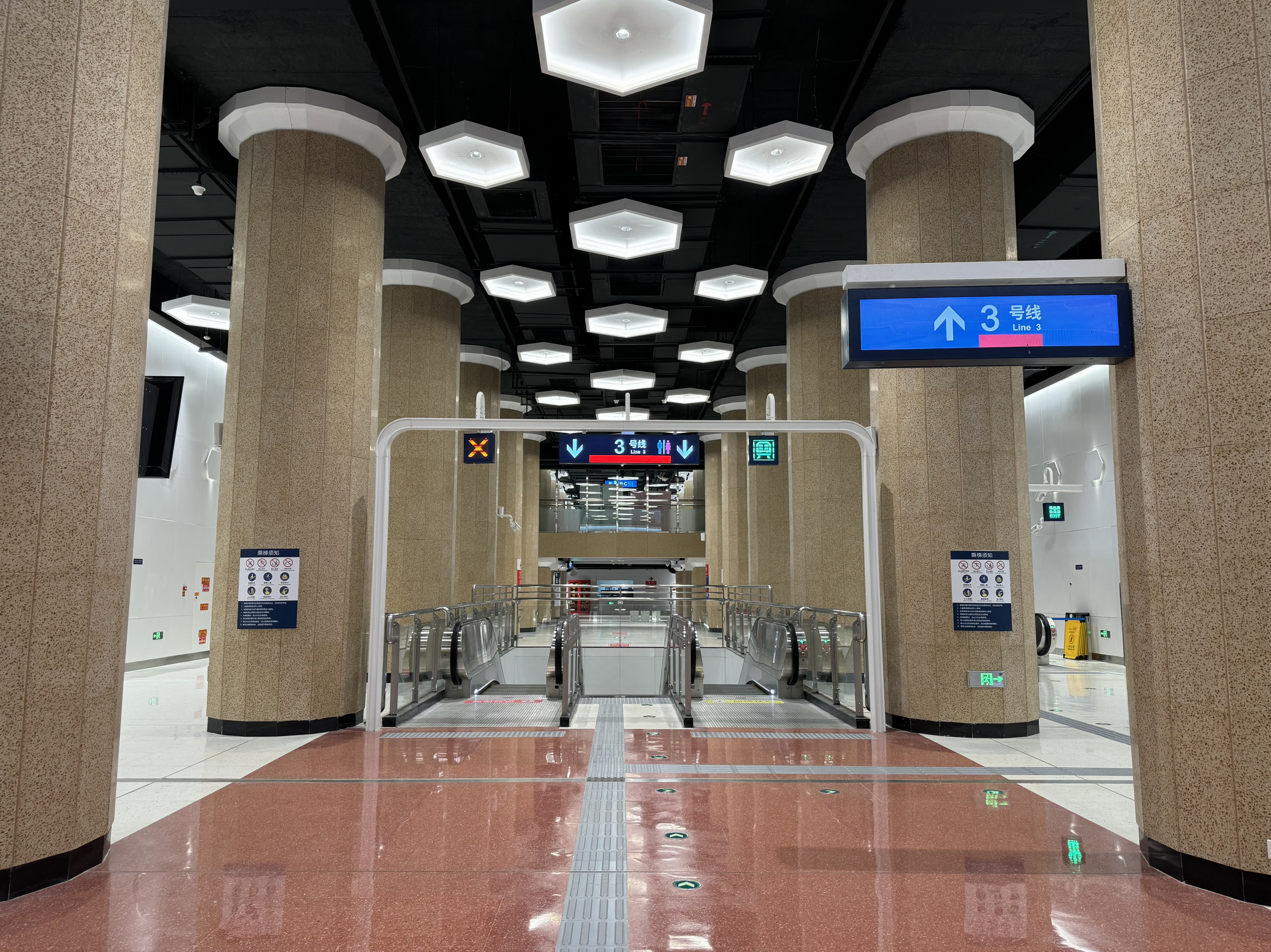
Transfer concourse (formerly reserved for Line 3 platforms)

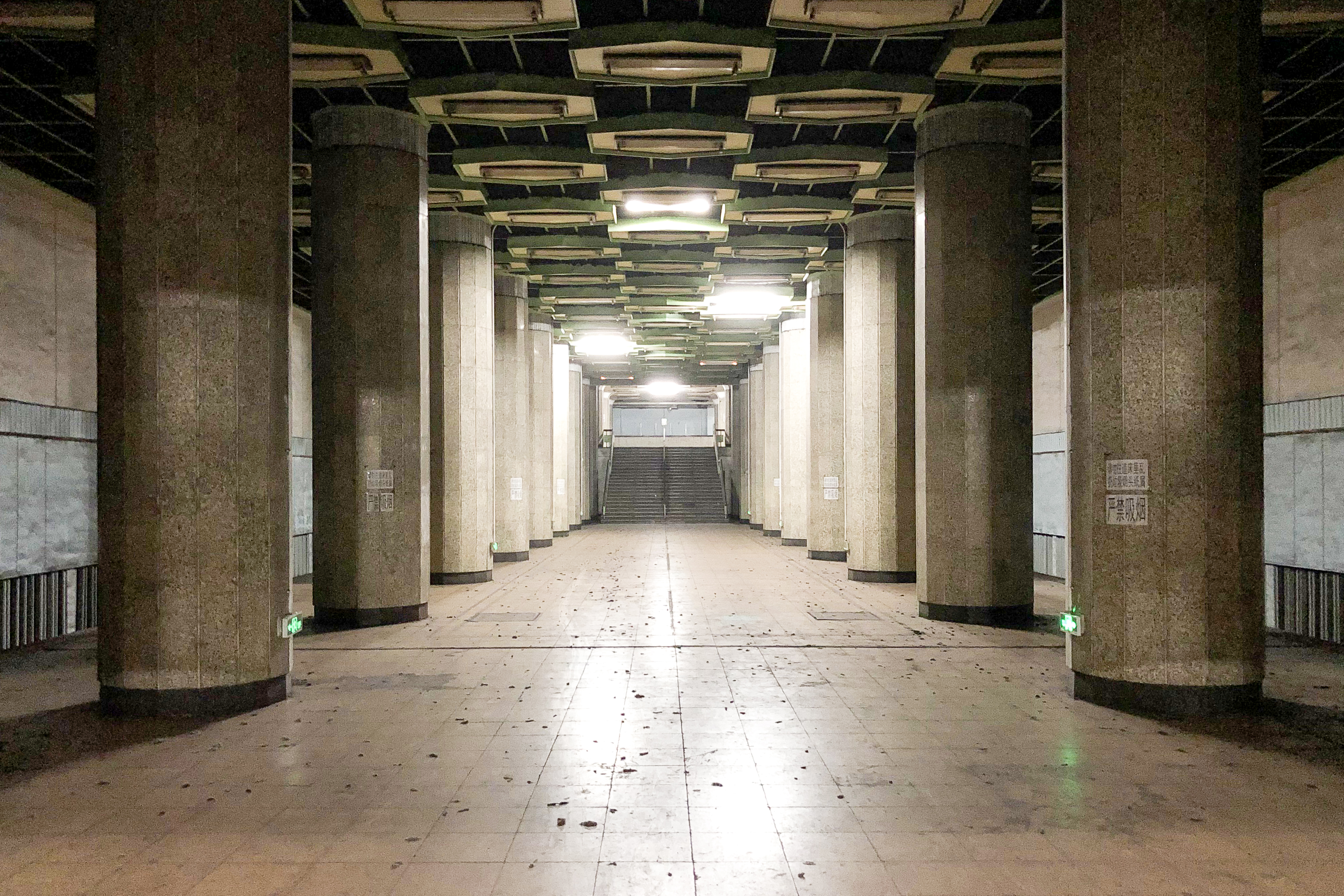
Platforms formerly reserved for Line 3, pictured in July 2021

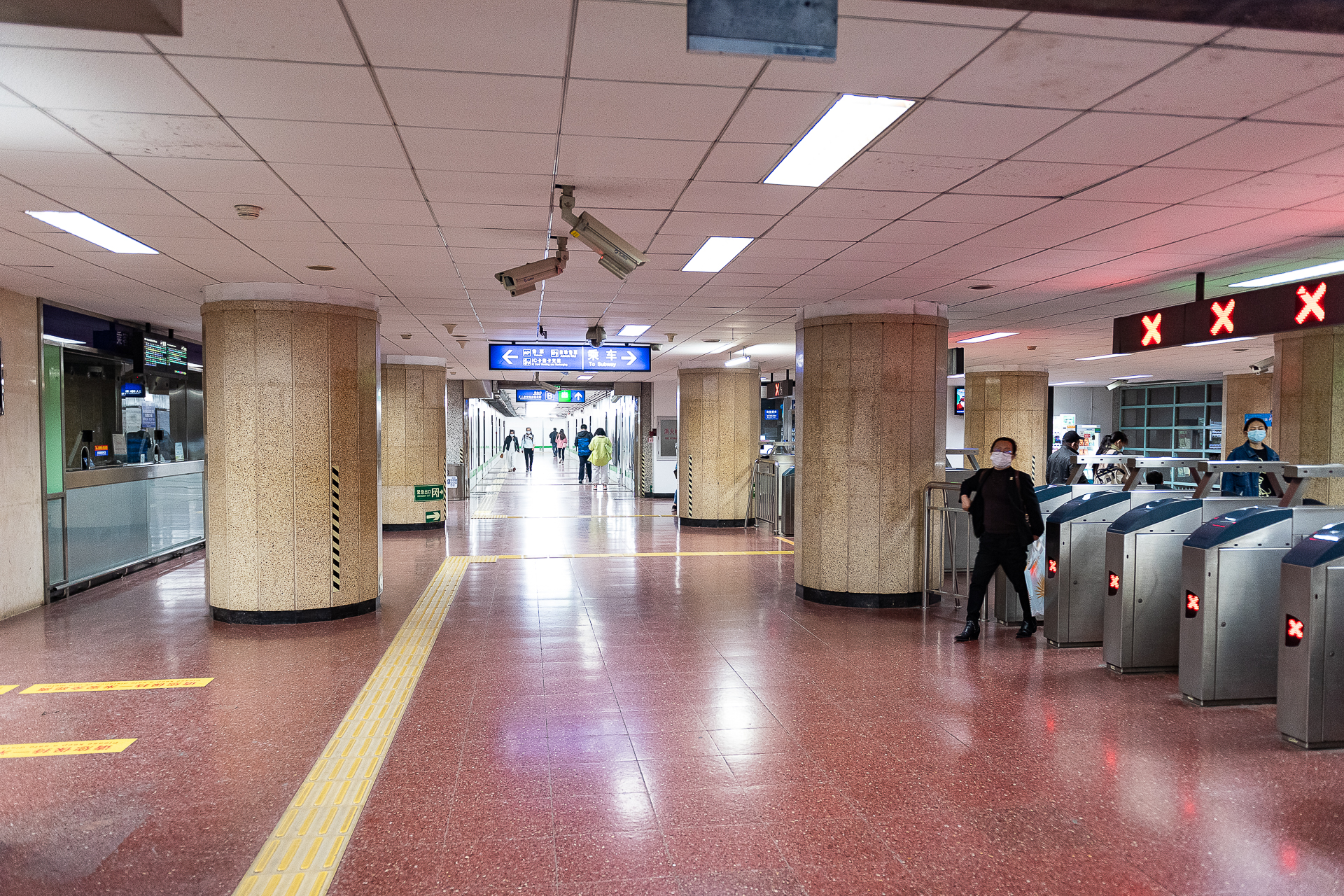
Line 2's North concourse (February 2021)

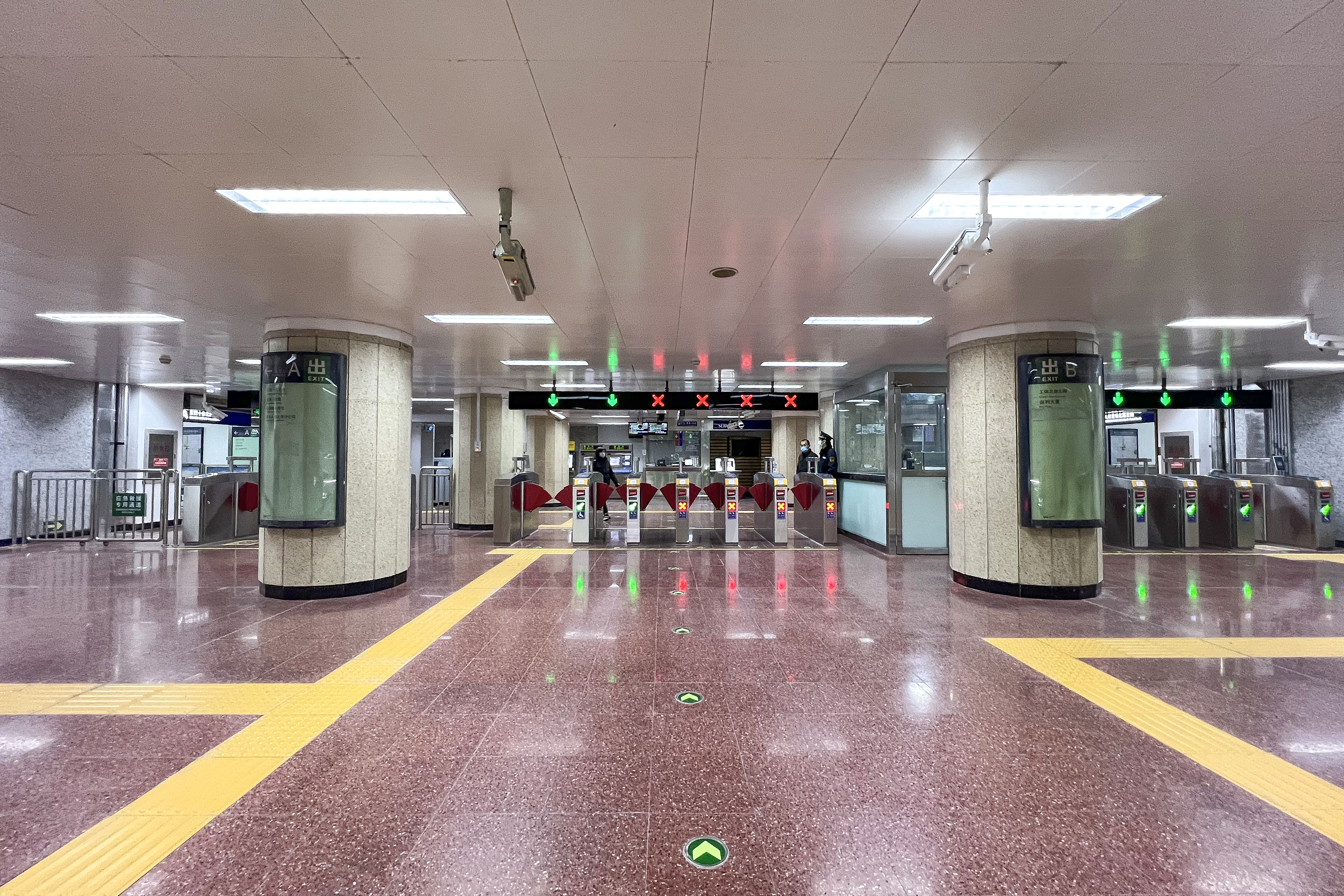
Line 2's North concourse (February 2024)

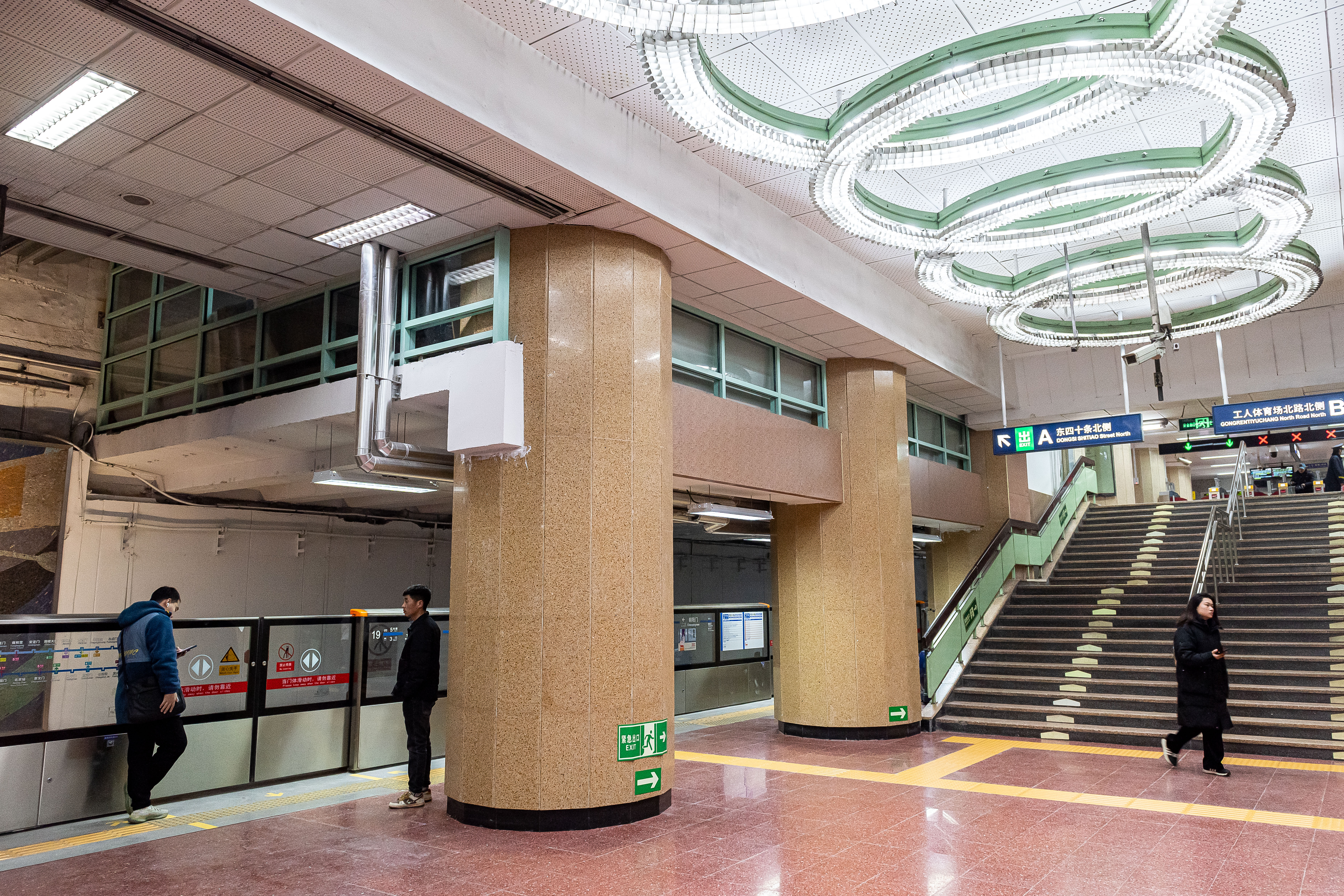
Line 2's North concourse extension (February 2024)

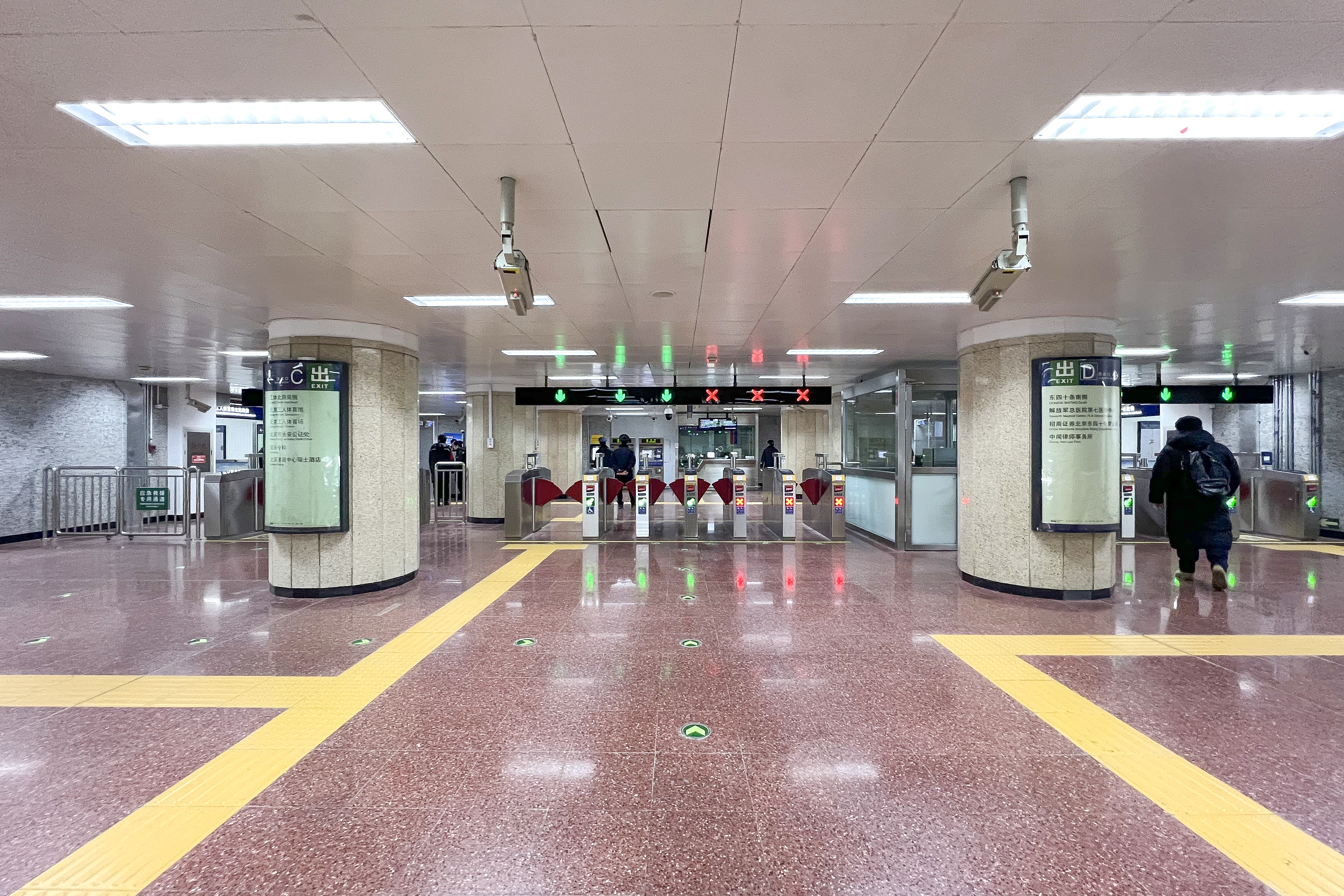
Line 2's south concourse

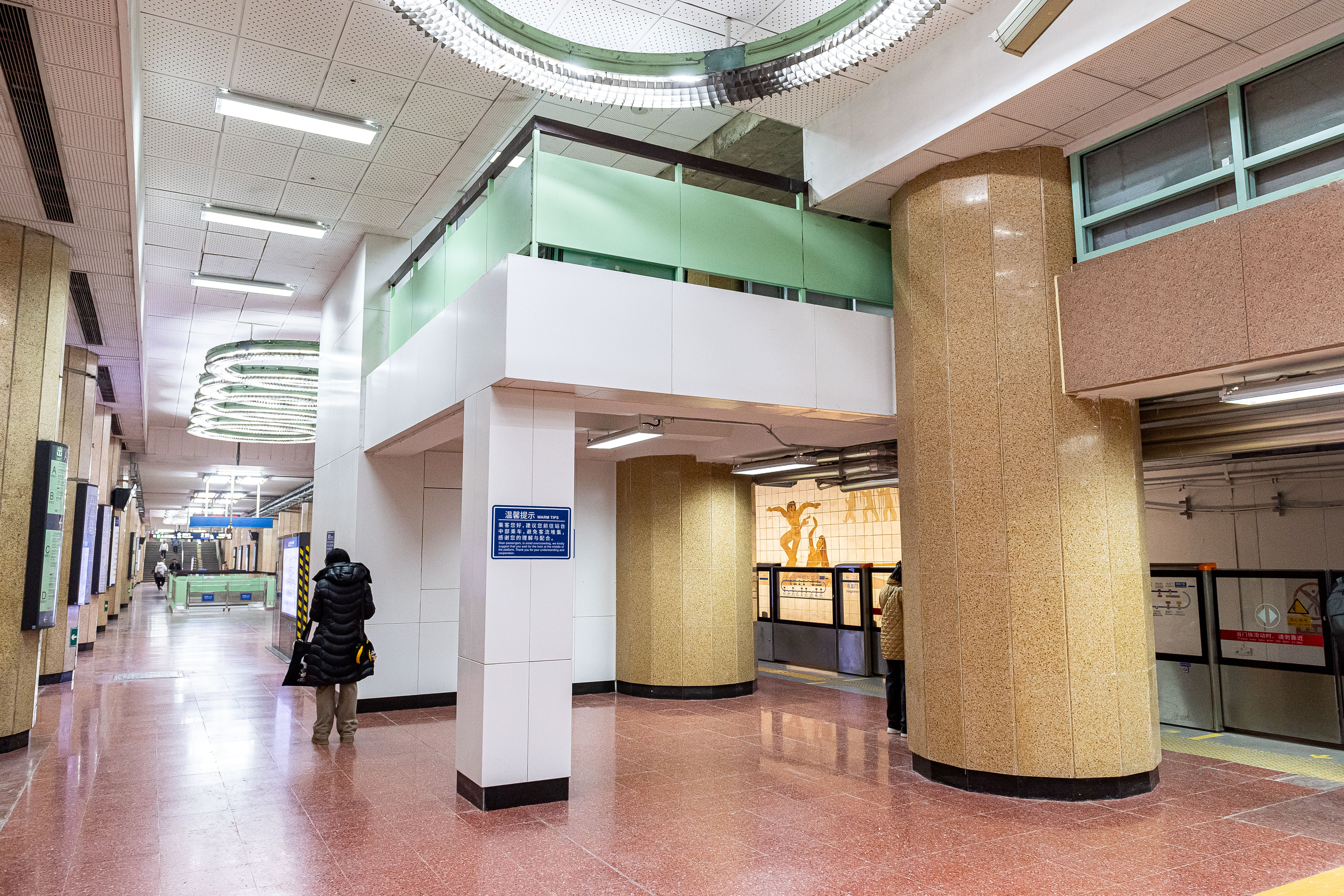
Line 2's South concourse extension (February 2024)

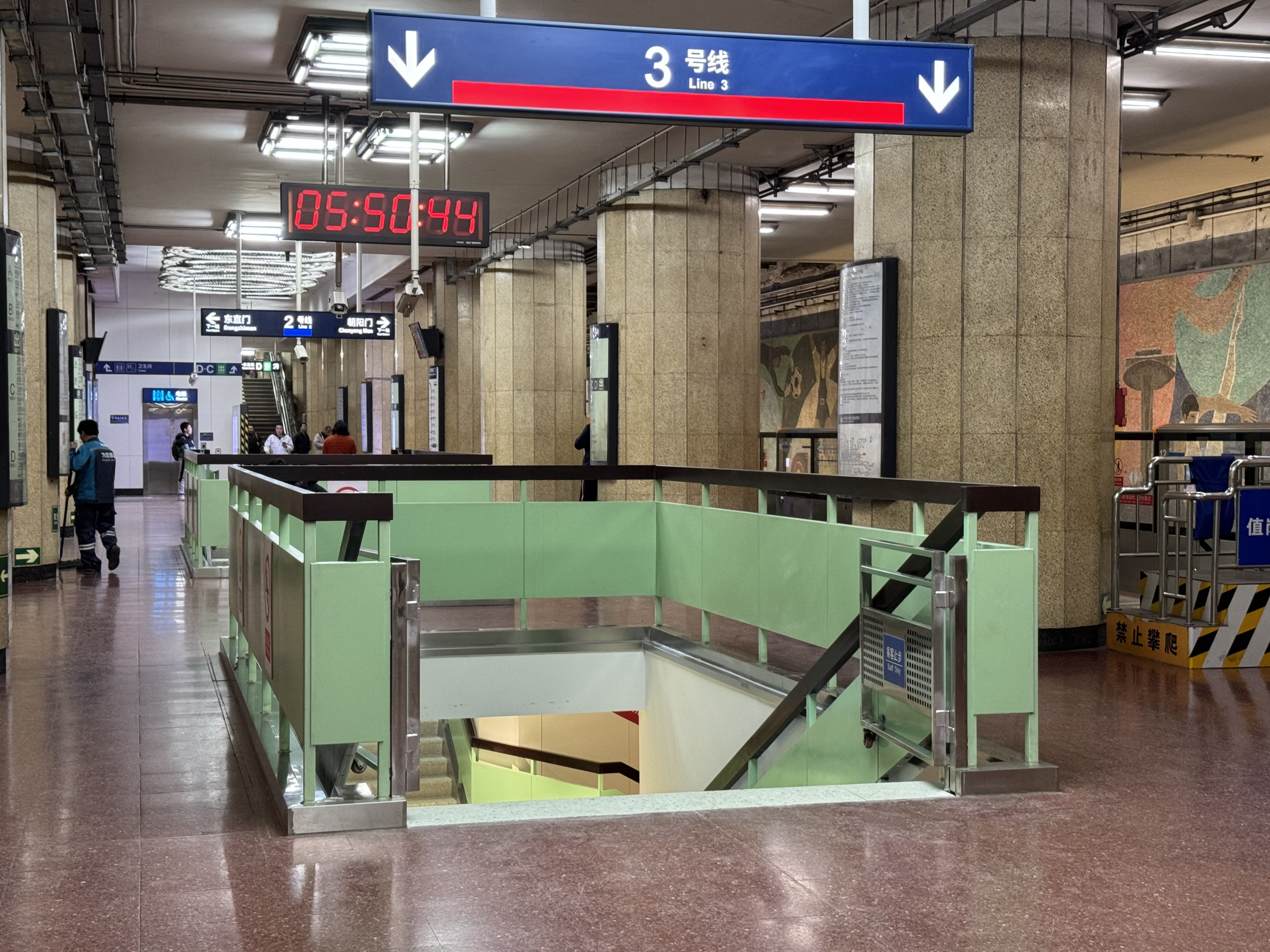
Interchange interface on Line 2's platform

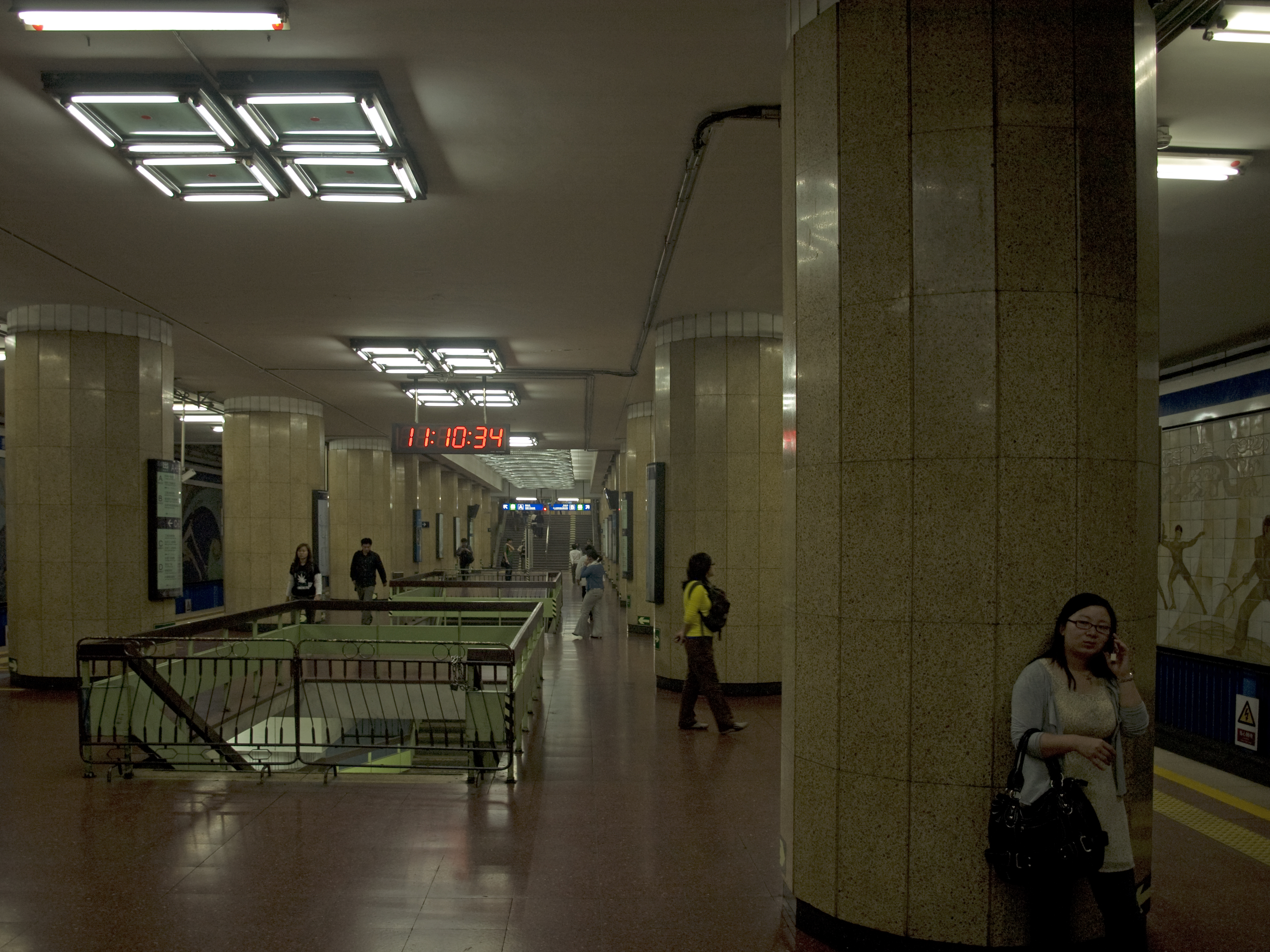
Line 2 platform before the installation of platform screen doors

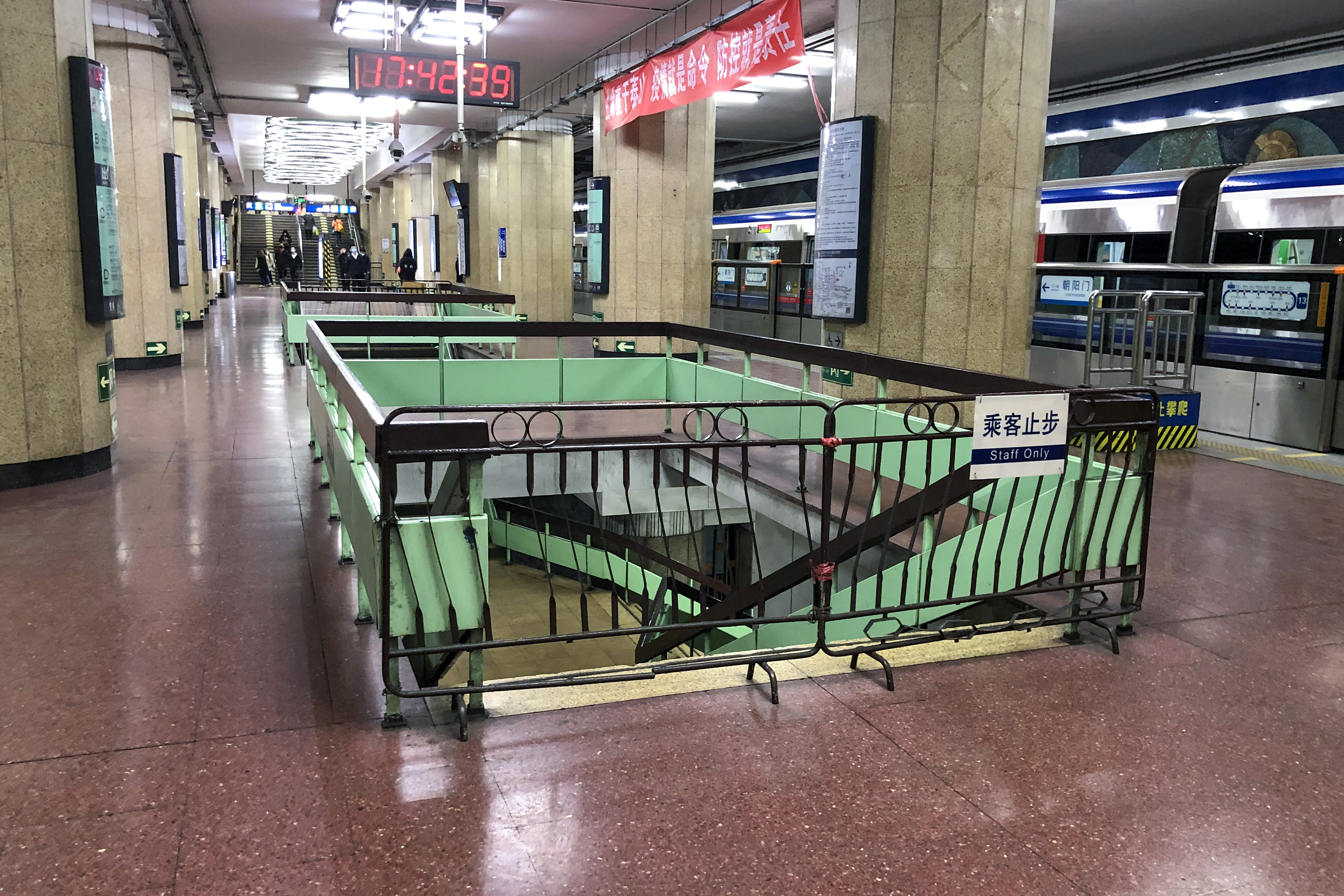
North transfer stairs from Line 2 to Line 3 before renovation (March 2020)

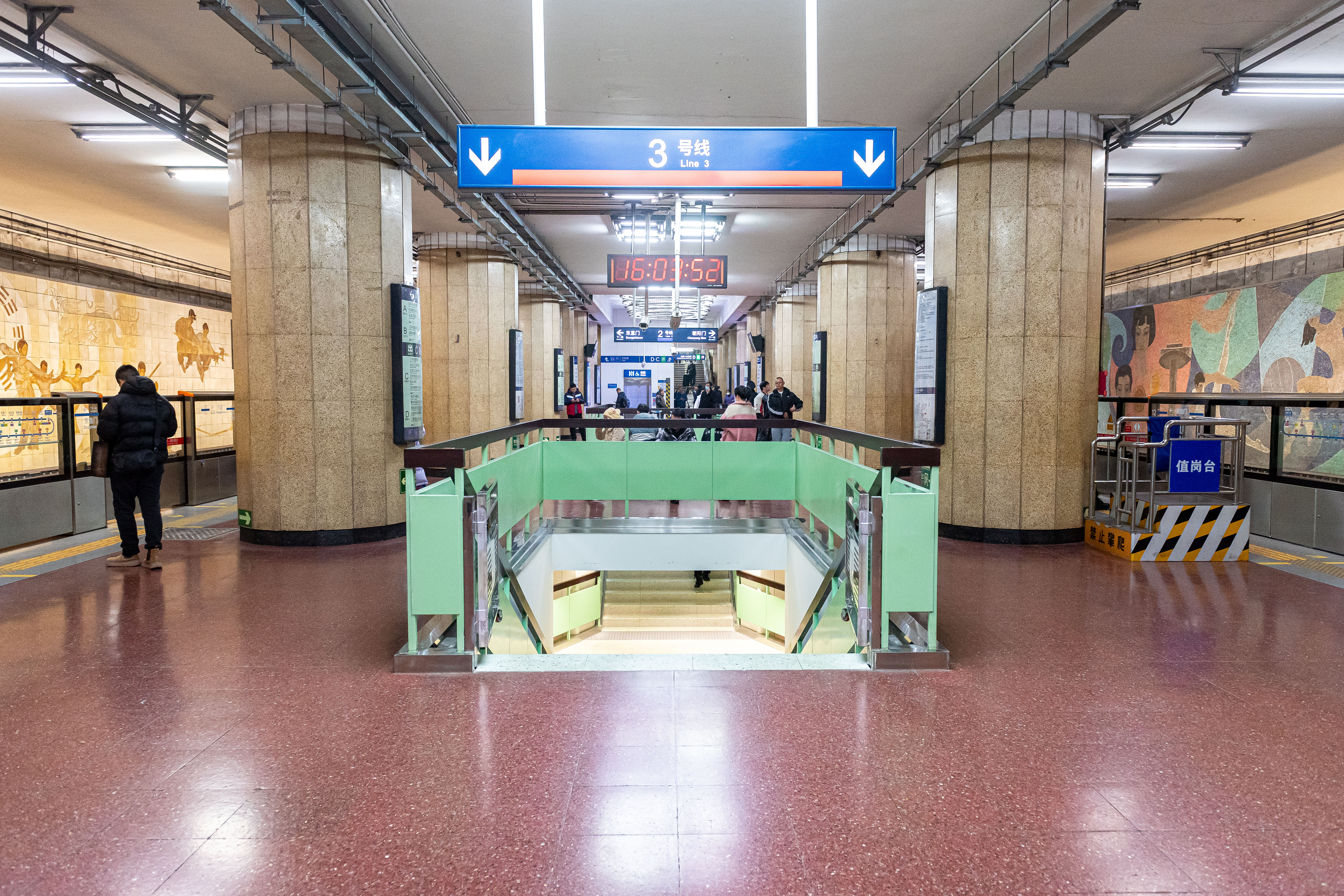
North transfer stairs from Line 2 to Line 3 post-renovation (December 2024)

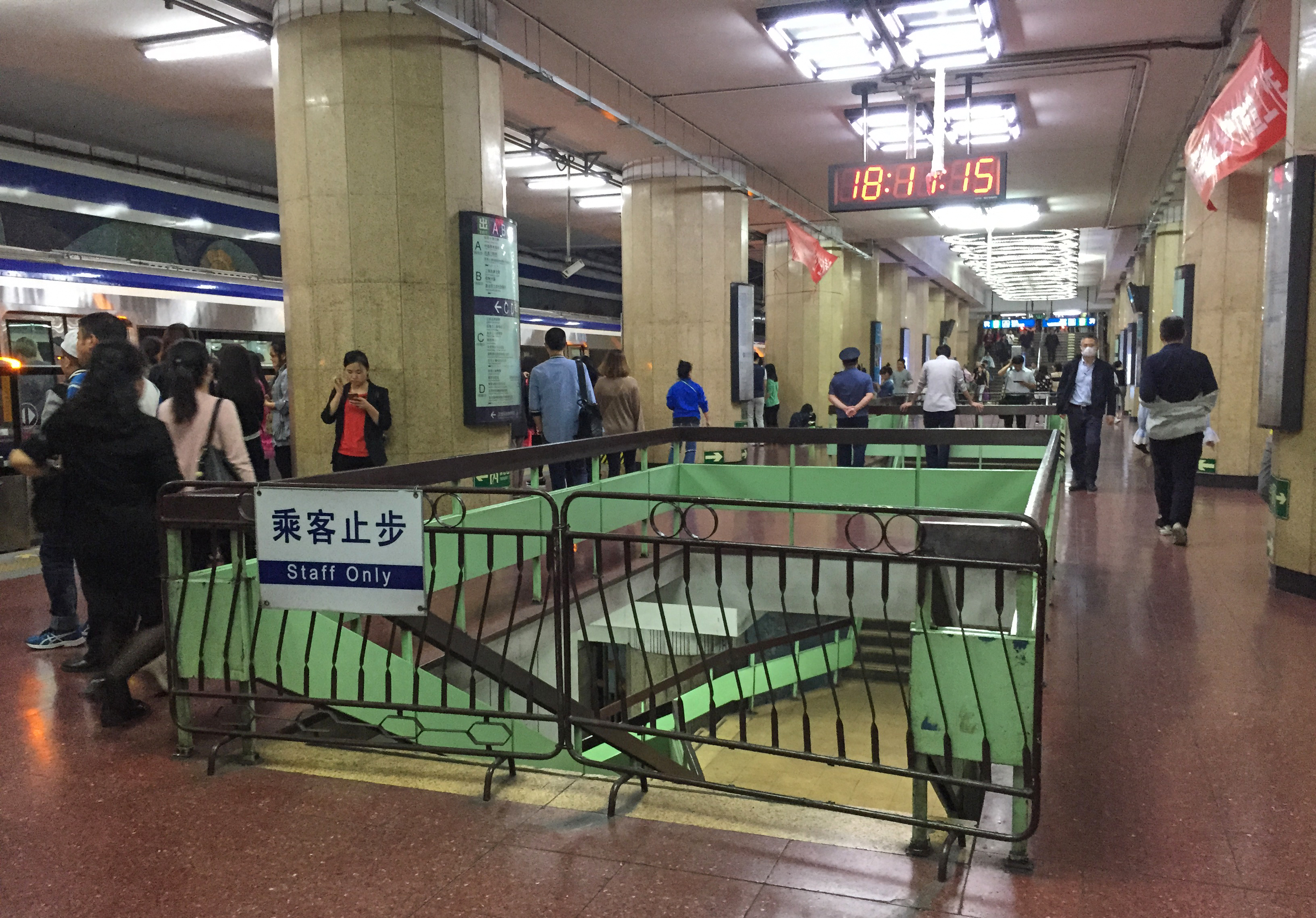
South transfer stairs from Line 2 to Line 3 before renovation (September 2017)

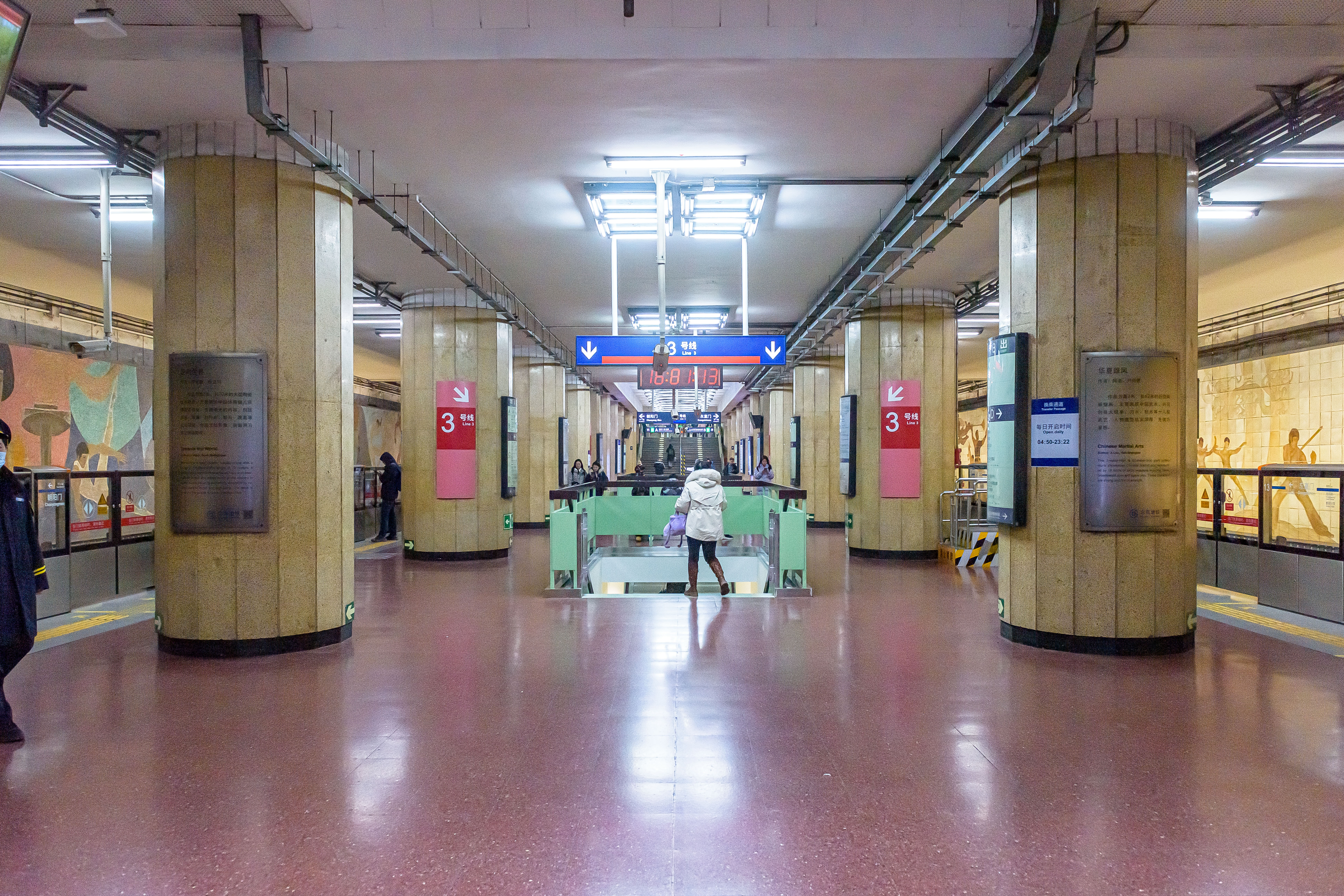
South transfer stairs from Line 2 to Line 3 post-renovation (December 2024)

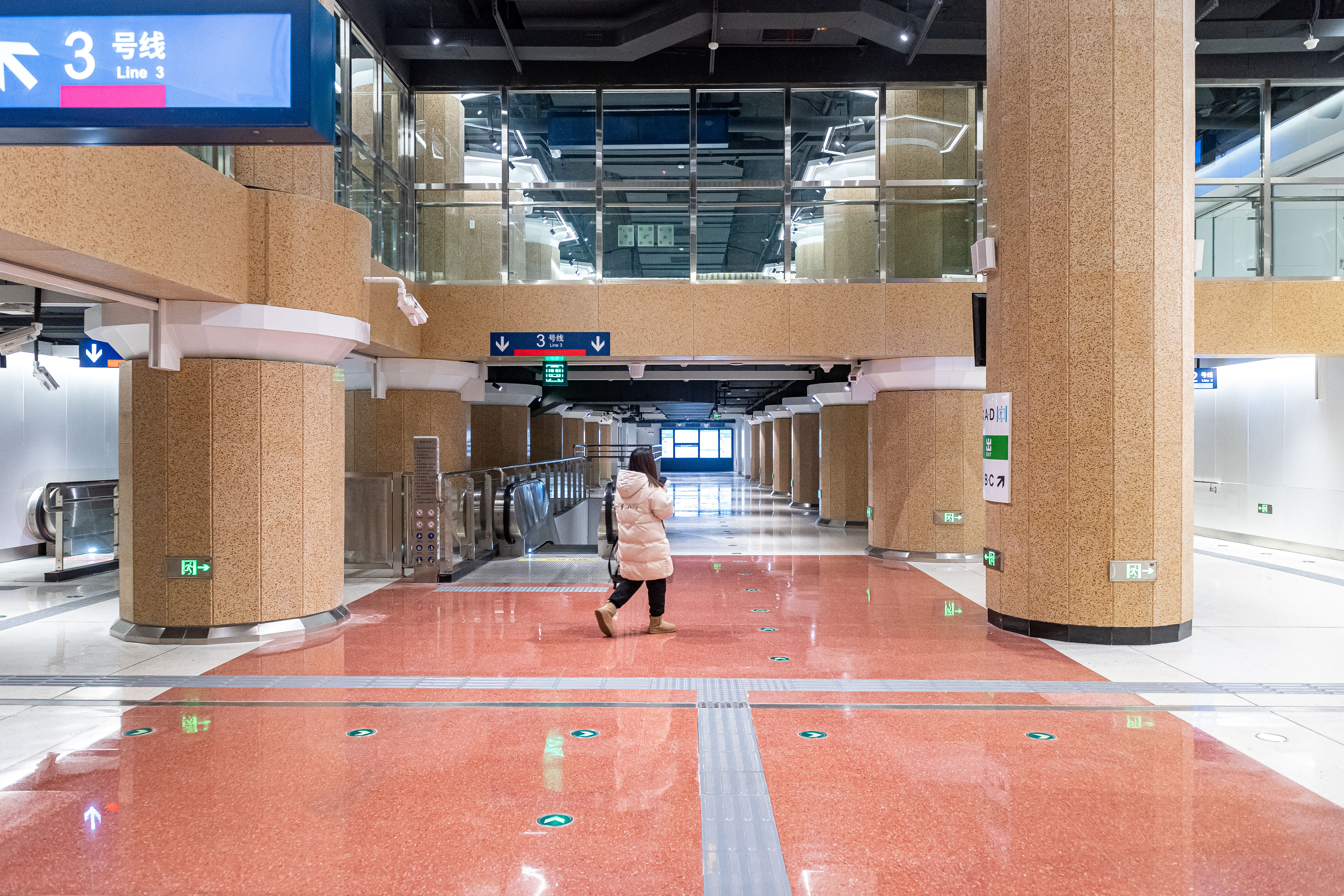
Western part of the original reserved platform converted to the transfer concourse (December 2024)

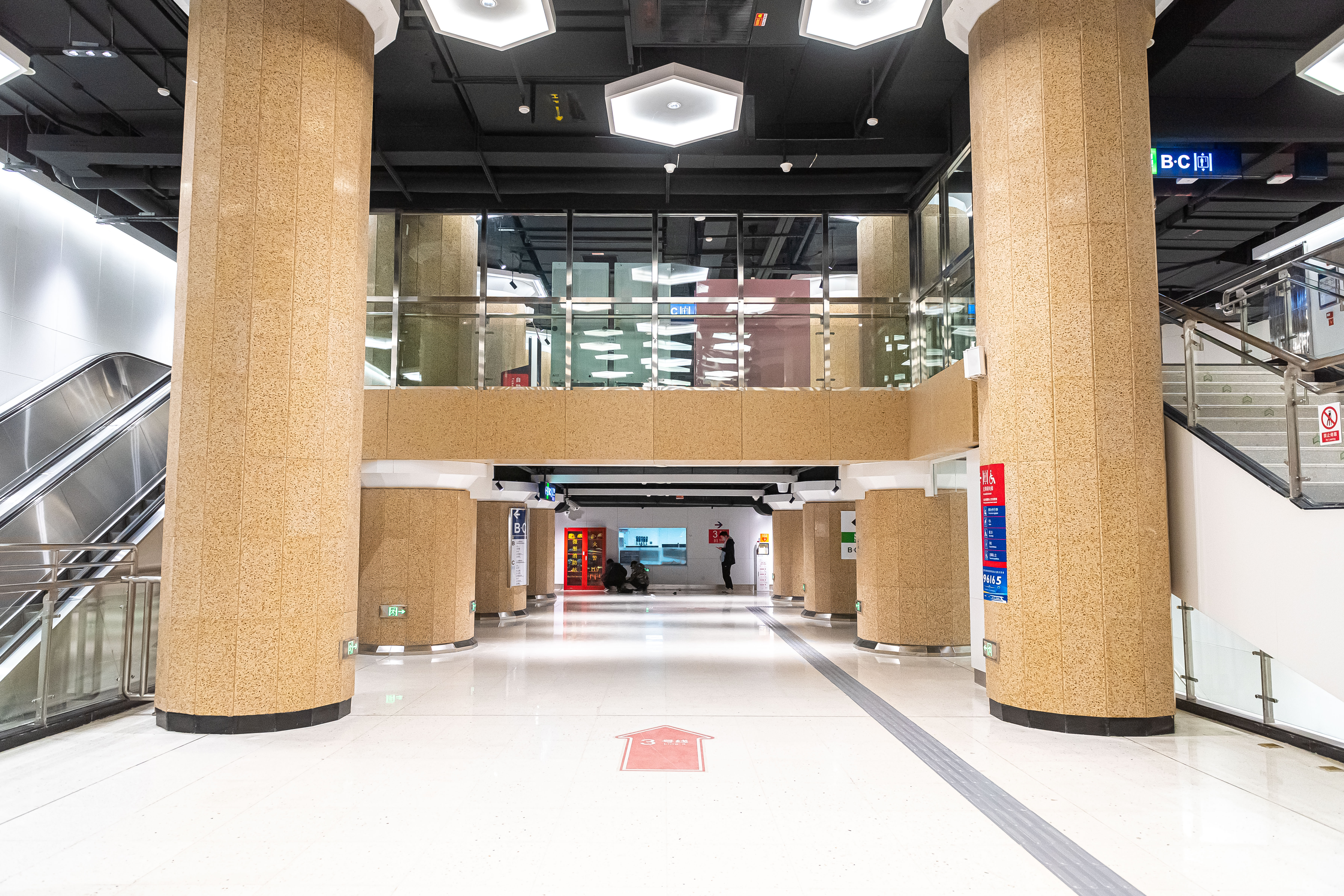
East end of the original reserved platform converted to the transfer concourse (December 2024)

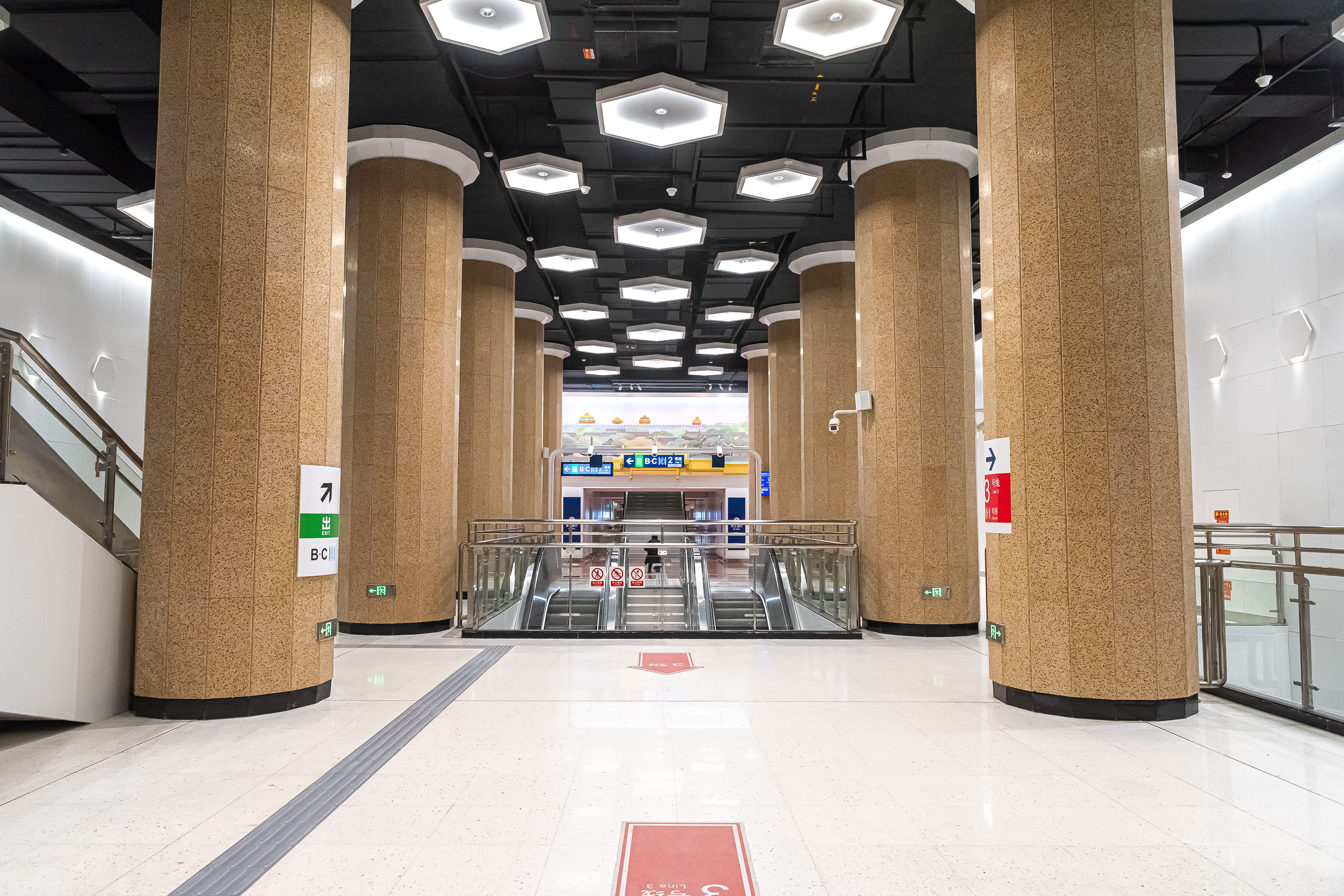
Eastern part of the original reserved platform converted to the conversion level (December 2024)

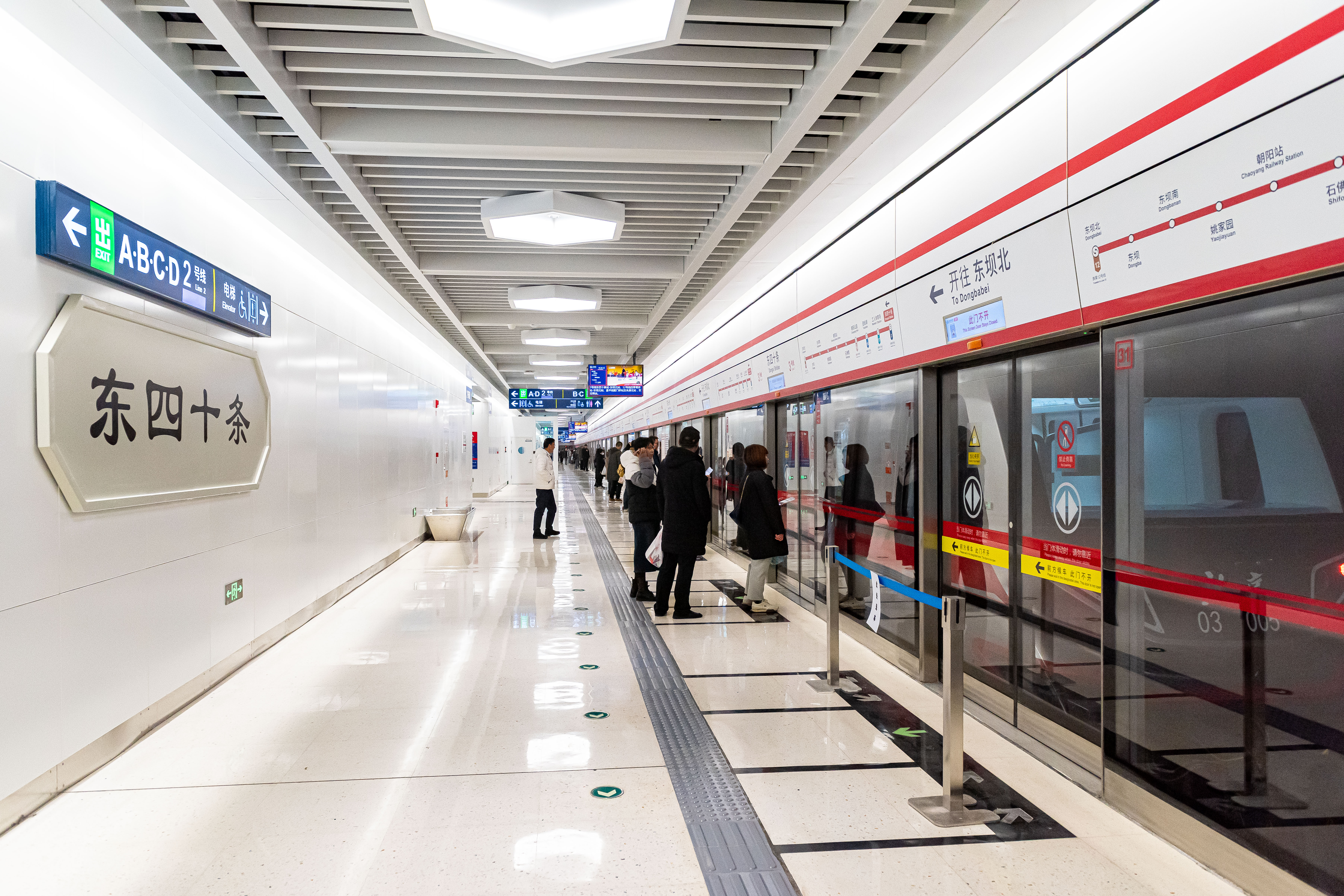
Line 3 originating platform (at the end of the 4th carriage)

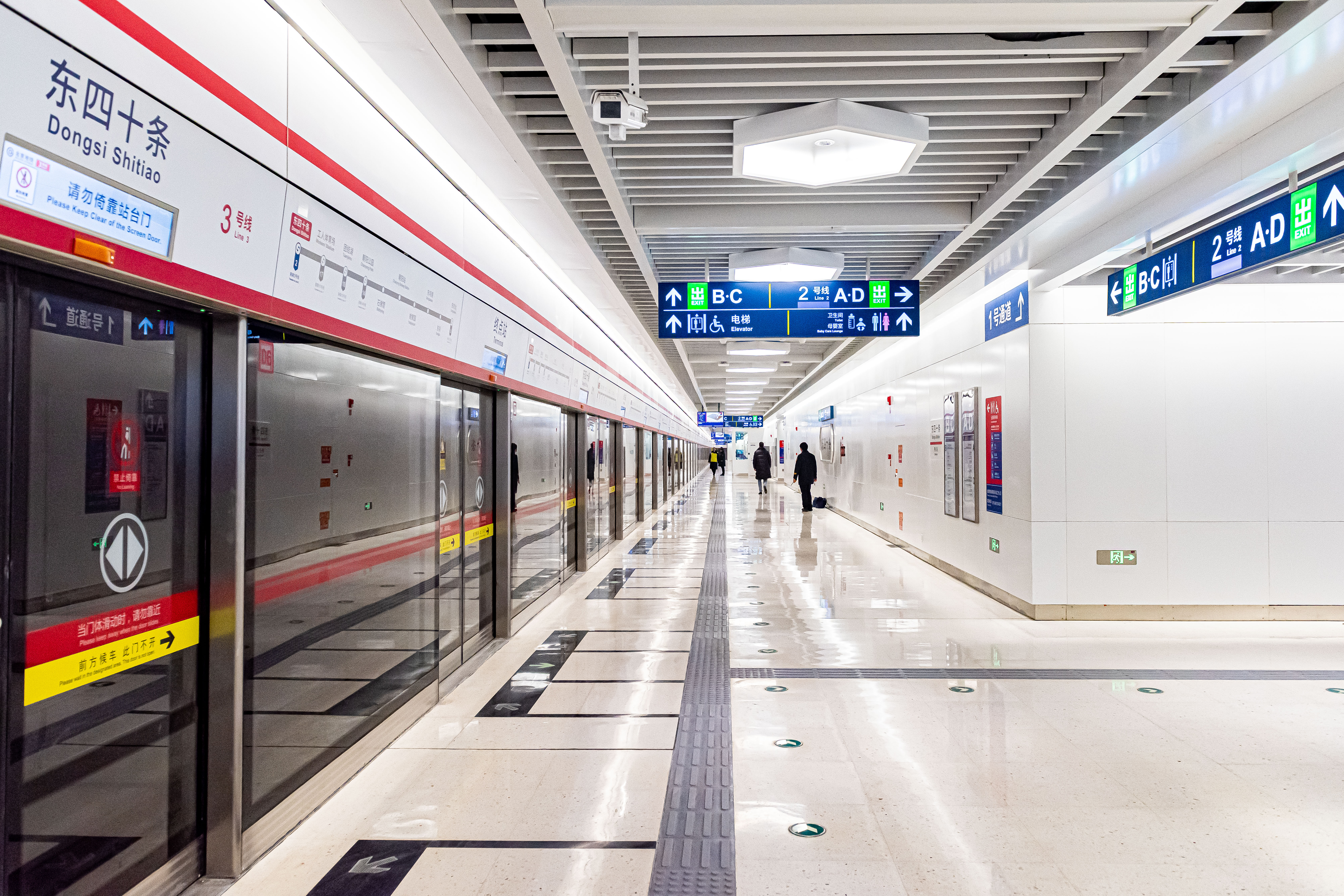
Line 3 terminating platform

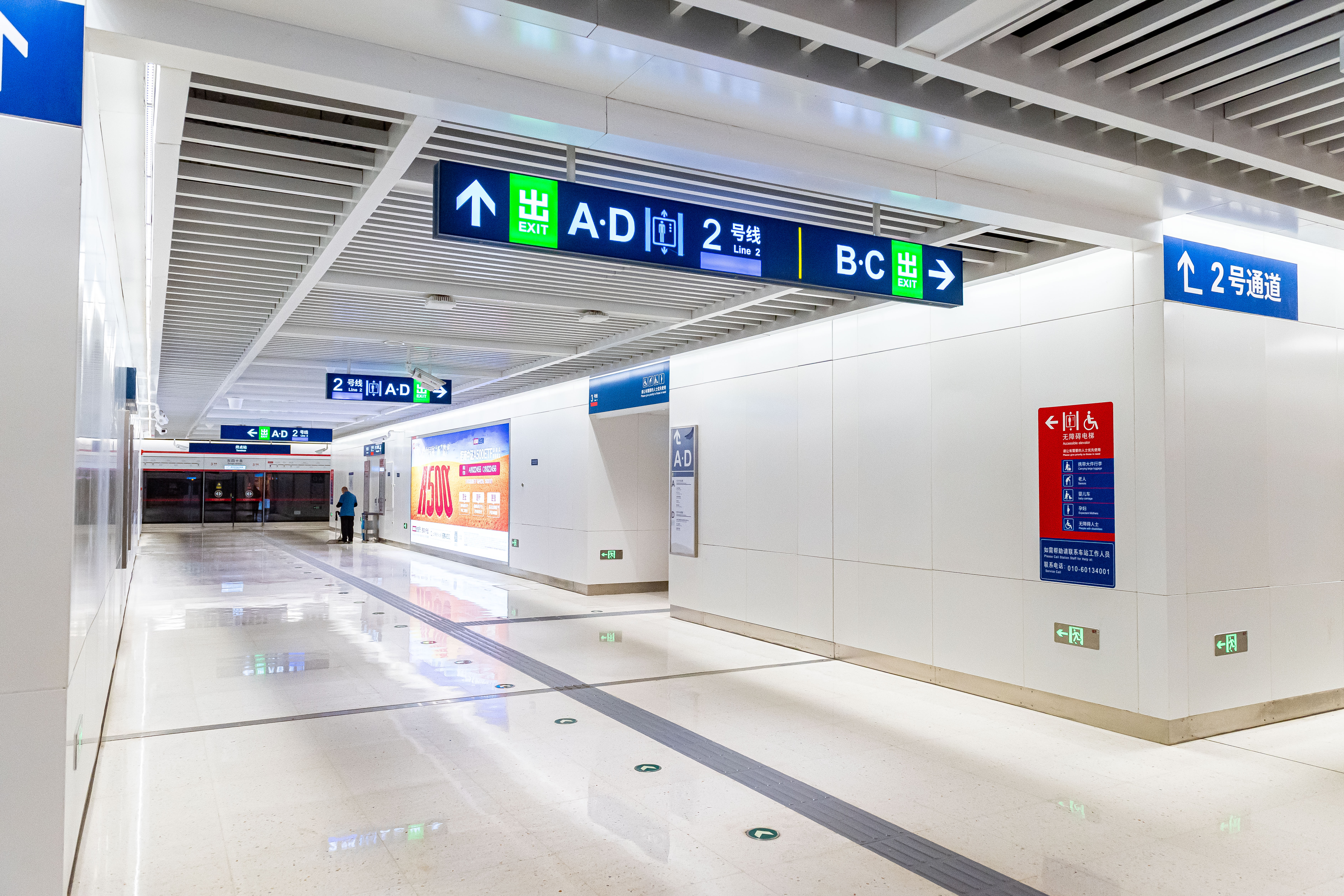
Line 3 platform passage 2

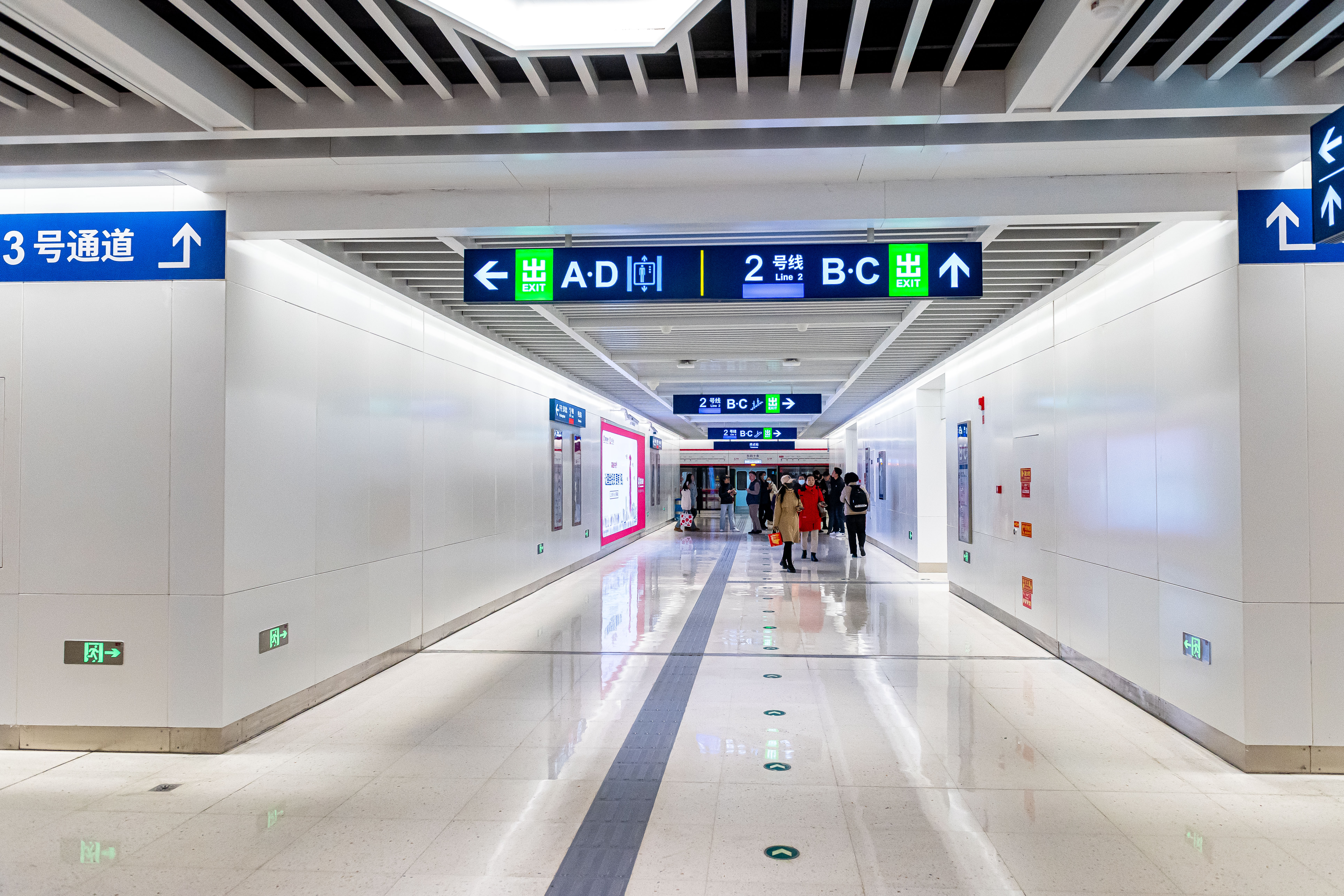
Line 3 platform passage 3

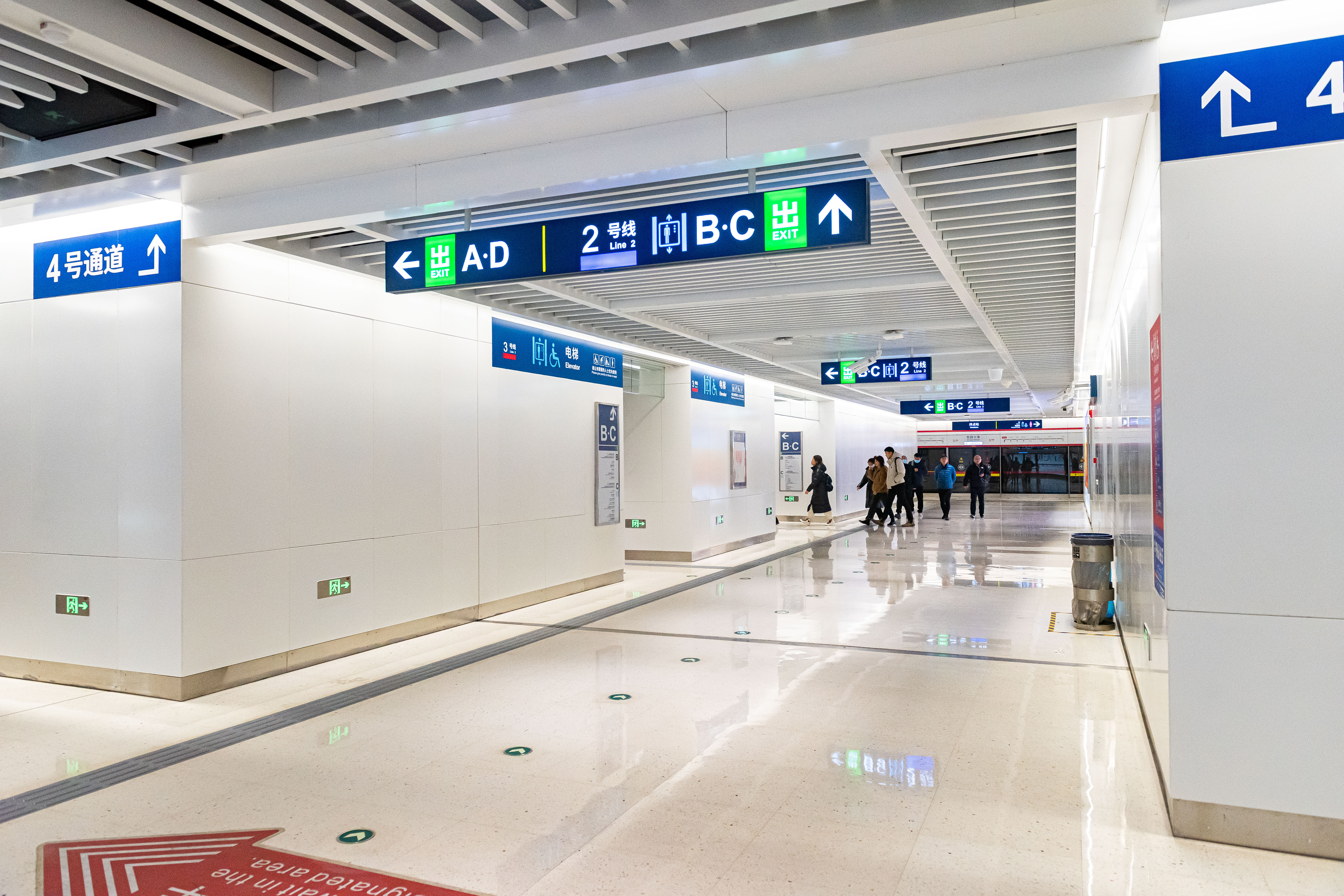
Line 3 platform passage 4
