= Ping'an Avenue =

Road in Beijing, China

Ping'an Avenue (Chinese: 平安大街; pinyin: Píng'ān Dàjiē; English translation: "Peaceful Avenue") refers to a section of the road network in Beijing, China.

Ping'an Avenue is not the name of any particular road; it refers to the stretch of roads from Guanyuan Bridge on the western 2nd Ring Road through to Dongsishitiao Bridge on the eastern 2nd Ring Road.
