= Anping =

Anping (Chinese: 安平 or 安坪) may refer to:

== China ==
- Anping County, of Hengshui, Hebei
- Anping, Cenxi, in Cenxi City, Guangxi
- Anping, Anping County, in Anping County, Hebei
- Anping, Xianghe County, in Xianghe County, Hebei
- Anping, Zhecheng County, in Zhecheng County, Henan
- Anping, Anren County, in Anren County, Hunan
- Anping, Lianyuan, in Lianyuan City, Hunan
- Anping, Chenxi (安坪镇), a town of Chenxi County, Hunan
- Anhai, formerly named Anping, in Jinjiang, Fujian
- Anping Bridge, near Anai, Jinjiang, Fujian

== Taiwan ==
- Anping, Tainan, a district in Tainan
- Fort Zeelandia (Taiwan), or Fort Anping (安平古堡), the oldest colonial fortress in Taiwan
- Pingzhen District, district in Taoyuan City, formerly the town of Anping

== See also ==
- Ping'an (disambiguation), written with the same Chinese characters in the reverse order
