= Heian =

The Japanese word Heian (平安, lit. "peace") may refer to:

- Heian period, an era of Japanese history
- Heian-kyō, the Heian-period capital of Japan that has become the present-day city of Kyoto
- Heian series, a group of karate kata (forms)
- Heian Shrine, a large shrine in the city of Kyoto
- "Heian", a song from the 2016 Momus album Scobberlotchers

== See also ==
- Ping'an (disambiguation), the Chinese pinyin transliteration of 平安
- Pyongan, the Korean hanja transliteration of 平安
