= Ping'an =

Ping'an (Chinese: 平安; lit. 'peace', 'tranquility') may refer to:

== Places ==
- Ping'an Avenue (平安街), major through route in Beijing, China
- Ping'an County (平安县), in Qinghai Province, China
- Ping'an Township (平安镇), name of several towns in China
  - Ping'an, Lanzhou, in Honggu District, Lanzhou, Gansu
  - Ping'an, Qing'an County, in Heilongjiang
  - Ping'an, Baicheng, in Taobei District, Baicheng, Jilin
  - Ping'an, Shulan, in Jilin
  - Ping'an, Ping'an County, in Qinghai
- Ping'an Town (平安乡), name of several townships in China
  - Ping'an Town, Zhangjiachuan County, in Gansu
  - Ping'an Township, Fengjie County, in Chongqing
  - Ping'an Township, Pengshui County, in Chongqing
  - Ping'an Township, Zhangjiachuan County, in Zhangjiachuan Hui Autonomous County, Tianshui, Gansu
  - Ping'an Township, Gongcheng County, in Guilin
  - Ping'an Township, Jiamusi, in Jiao District, Jiamusi, Heilongjiang
  - Ping'an Township, Hure Banner, in Tongliao, Inner Mongolia
  - Ping'an Township, Dawa County, in Liaoning
  - Ping'an Township, Zhangwu County, in Liaoning
  - Ping'an Township, Yuechi County, in Guang'an, Sichuan
- Ping'an Community (平安社区), name of several communities in China
  - Ping'an, Dongsheng, Shishou, Jingzhou, Hubei
- Ping'an, Haidong, administrative district of Haidong, in Qinghai

== Other uses ==
- Ping An Finance Centre
- Ping An Insurance (平安保险), Chinese insurance company
- Ping An Bank

== See also ==
- Anping (disambiguation)
- Ping (disambiguation)
- An (disambiguation)
